= Donta Scott =

American basketball player (born 2000)

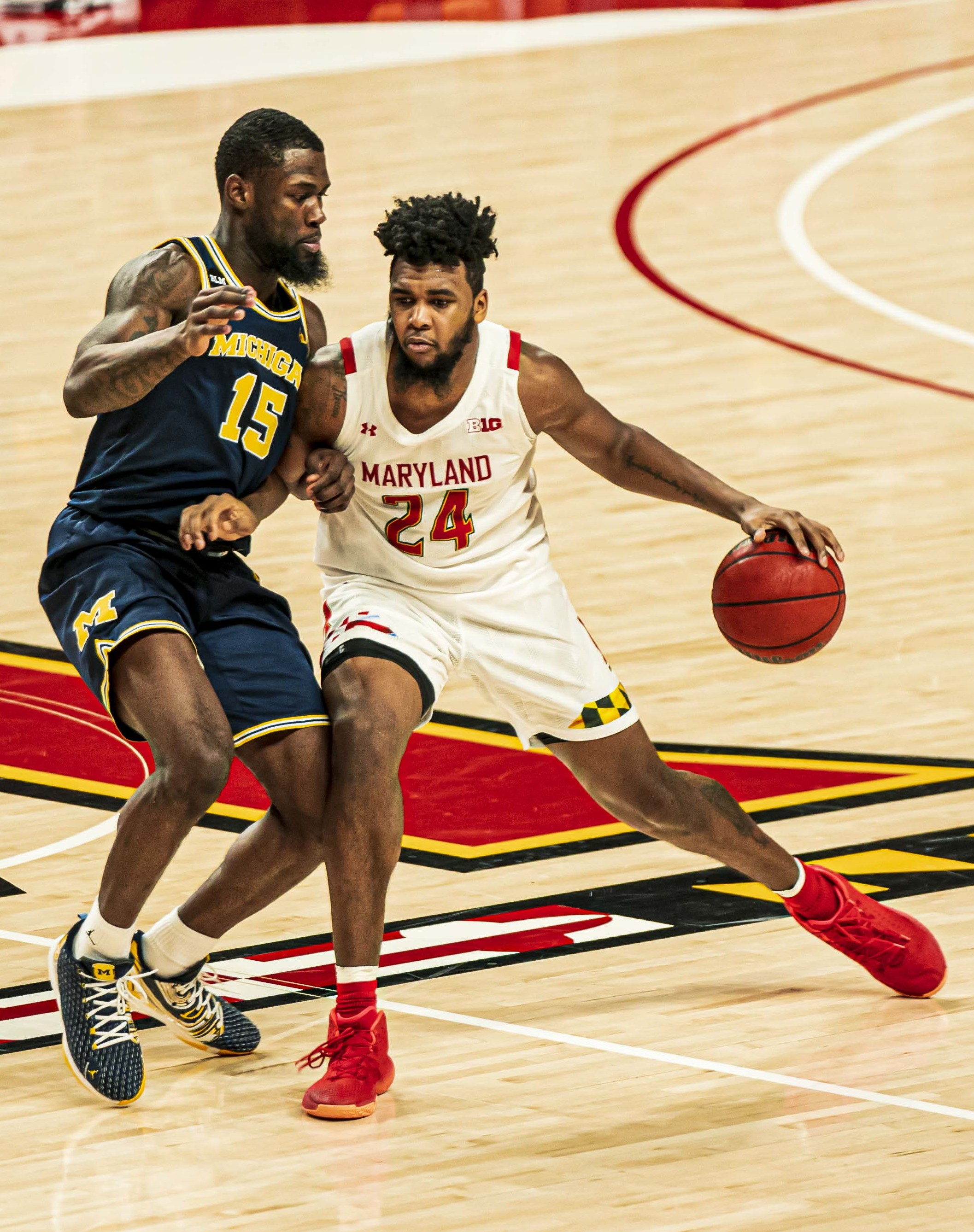
- Scott (right) with Maryland in 2020

No. 24 – Nanterre 92
- Position: Small forward
- League: LNB Élite; Champions League

Personal information
- Born: December 4, 2000 (age 25) Philadelphia, Pennsylvania, U.S.
- Listed height: 6 ft 8 in (2.03 m)
- Listed weight: 230 lb (104 kg)

Career information
- High school: Imhotep Institute Charter (Philadelphia, Pennsylvania)
- College: Maryland (2019–2024)
- NBA draft: 2024: undrafted
- Playing career: 2024–present

Career history
- 2024–2025: Santa Cruz Warriors
- 2025–present: Nanterre 92
- Stats at NBA.com
- Stats at Basketball Reference

Donta Romell Scott (born December 4, 2000) is an American professional basketball player for Nanterre 92 of the LNB Pro A and the Champions League. He played college basketball for the Maryland Terrapins.

== High school career ==
Scott attended Imhotep Institute Charter High School in Philadelphia. He played multiple positions and moved to point guard after the departure of Fatts Russell. Scott helped his team win three straight Philadelphia Public League and Class 4A state titles. He was a two-time Class 4A Player of the Year. He committed to playing college basketball for Maryland over offers from La Salle, Temple, Seton Hall and South Carolina.

== College career ==
Scott entered Maryland's starting lineup by mid-December of his freshman season. As a freshman, he averaged 5.9 points and 3.6 rebounds per game. During his sophomore season, Scott emerged as one of his team's best players, improving his shooting ability. He averaged 11 points and 5.9 rebounds per game, shooting 48.8 percent from the field. As a junior, Scott averaged 12.6 points and 6.2 rebounds per game. He averaged 11.3 points and 6 rebounds as a senior. Scott returned for his fifth season of eligibility.

== Professional career ==
=== Santa Cruz Warriors (2024–2025) ===
After going undrafted in the 2024 NBA draft, Scott joined the Golden State Warriors for the 2024 NBA Summer League, and on September 17, 2024, he signed with the team. However, he was waived four days later and on October 28, he joined the Santa Cruz Warriors.

=== Nanterre 92 (2025–present) ===
On August 13, 2025, he signed with Nanterre 92 of the LNB Pro A.

== Career statistics ==
Legend
GP	Games played	GS	Games started	MPG	Minutes per game
FG%	Field goal percentage	3P%	3-point field goal percentage	FT%	Free throw percentage
RPG	Rebounds per game	APG	Assists per game	SPG	Steals per game
BPG	Blocks per game	PPG	Points per game	**Bold**	Career high

=== College ===
Year	Team	GP	GS	MPG	FG%	3P%	FT%	RPG	APG	SPG	BPG	PPG
2019–20	Maryland	**31**	21	21.6	.439	.316	**.846**	3.6	.5	.5	.1	5.9
2020–21	Maryland	**31**	**27**	**30.3**	**.498**	**.438**	.663	**5.9**	**2.0**	**.7**	**.8**	**11.0**
Career		62	48	26.0	.474	.387	.706	4.8	1.3	.6	.5	8.4
