= Mr. and Miss Pennsylvania Basketball =

Mr Pennsylvania Basketball Miss Pennsylvania Basketball
- Awarded for: Top high school basketball talent in Pennsylvania
- Date: 2013; 13 years ago
- Location: Pennsylvania, U.S.

Television/radio coverage
- Network: PCN
- Runtime: 30 minutes

Mr. and Miss Pennsylvania Basketball is a yearly award given to the best high school basketball player in Pennsylvania. Twenty-five of each boys and girls student athletes are nominated by PAbball.com and states coaches and media vote for final six nominees and the public along with coaches votes for the winner.

== Winners ==
Bold = Active professionally

* Active Collegiately

=== 2014 ===
- Boys: J.C. Show* — Abington Heights, Guard
- Girls: Erin Mathias* — Fox Chapel, Forward

=== 2015 ===
- Boys: **Derrick Jones Jr.** — Archbishop Carroll, Forward
- Girls: Kelly Jekot* — Cumberland Valley, Guard

=== 2016 ===
- Boys: **Tony Carr** — Roman Catholic, Guard
- Girls: Kelly Jekot* — Cumberland Valley, Guard

=== 2017 ===
- Boys: **Lonnie Walker** — Reading, Guard
- Girls: Abby Kapp — Boyertown, Forward

=== 2018 ===
- Boys: **Cam Reddish** — Norristown, Forward
- Girls: Taylor O'Brien, — Plymouth Whitemarsh, Guard

=== 2019 ===
- Boys: Eric Dixon* — Abington, Forward
- Girls: Alli Campbell — Bellwood-Antis, Guard

=== 2020 ===
- Boys: Ethan Morton — Butler, Forward
- Girls: Diamond Johnson — Neumann-Goretti, Guard

=== 2021 ===
- Boys: Stevie Mitchell — Wilson, Guard
- Girls: Lucy Olsen — Spring-Ford, Guard

=== 2022 ===
- Boys: **Dereck Lively II** — Westtown, Center
- Girls:Ryanne Allen — Archbishop Wood, Guard

=== 2023 ===
- Boys: **Justin Edwards** — Imhotep, Forward
- Girls: Ciera Toomey — Dunmore, Center

=== 2024 ===
- Boys: Greg Guidinger — Central York, Forward
- Girls: Molly Rullo — Cardinal O'Hara, Forward

=== 2025 ===
- Boys: Jake West* — Penn Charter, Guard
- Girls: Grace Galbavy — Perkiomen Valley, Guard

== Winners by high school ==
#	School	Year
2	Cumberland Valley High School	2015, 2016
