= Zahir Mathis =

American football player

No. 9 – Maryland Terrapins
- Position: Defensive end
- Class: Freshman

Personal information
- Listed height: 6 ft 6 in (1.98 m)
- Listed weight: 220 lb (100 kg)

Career information
- High school: Imhotep Institute (Philadelphia, Pennsylvania)
- College: Maryland (2025–present)

Zahir Mathis is an American football defensive end for the Maryland Terrapins.

== Early life ==
Mathis is from Philadelphia, Pennsylvania. He is a Muslim. At age 14, his mother died from cancer, and he afterwards was raised by his grandmother. Mathis attended Imhotep Institute Charter High School where he played football as a defensive end. As a senior, he posted 30 tackles and three sacks, helping Imhotep to a record of 10–2.

Mathis was invited to the 2025 Under Armour All-America Game. He was highly recruited and received his first offer to play college football in 2021. A consensus four-star recruit, he was ranked by ESPN as the 60th-best player nationally, the top player in the state, and the fifth-best defensive end. Mathis initially committed to play for the Ohio State Buckeyes, before withdrawing his commitment in November 2024. He later committed to play for the Maryland Terrapins in February 2025.

== College career ==
Mathis saw immediate playing time for Maryland as a true freshman in 2025.
