= 2024 NBA draft =

78th edition of the NBA draft

General information
- Sport: Basketball
- Date: June 26–27, 2024
- Location: Barclays Center (Brooklyn, New York, first round); ESPN's Seaport District Studios (Manhattan, New York, second round)
- Networks: ESPN; ABC (first round only)

Overview
- 58 total selections in 2 rounds
- League: National Basketball Association
- First selection: Zaccharie Risacher (Atlanta Hawks)

The 2024 NBA draft was the 78th edition of the National Basketball Association's annual draft. Unlike recent years, the 2024 draft took place over two nights. This was the first NBA draft held over multiple nights since the current two-round format debuted in 1989.

The first round of the draft took place on June 26, 2024, at Barclays Center in Brooklyn, New York, while the second round took place on June 27 at ESPN's Seaport District Studios in Manhattan. The time between second-round picks expanded from two minutes to four. For the third year in a row, the draft had 58 picks instead of the typical 60: both the Philadelphia 76ers and the Phoenix Suns lost second-round picks for violations of the NBA's tampering rules during free agency.

The first overall selection was owned by the Atlanta Hawks, which they used to select French forward Zaccharie Risacher, making him the second consecutive French player to be drafted with the number one pick, after the San Antonio Spurs had picked Victor Wembanyama in the previous year's edition. France became the second nation (after the U.S.) to have at least three native players picked in the top 10 spots of any NBA draft following the selections of Risacher, Alex Sarr, and Tidjane Salaün, as well as the second nation (after the U.S.) to have two native players get selected with the first and second overall picks. The eventual Rookie of the Year would be fourth pick Stephon Castle for the Spurs.

Bronny James, the son of LeBron James, was selected 55th overall in the second round and would become the first player in NBA history to play alongside his father.

== Draft selections ==
PG	Point guard	SG	Shooting guard	SF	Small forward	PF	Power forward	C	Center

^{#}	Denotes player who has never appeared in an NBA regular-season or playoff game
^{~}	Denotes player who has been selected as Rookie of the Year

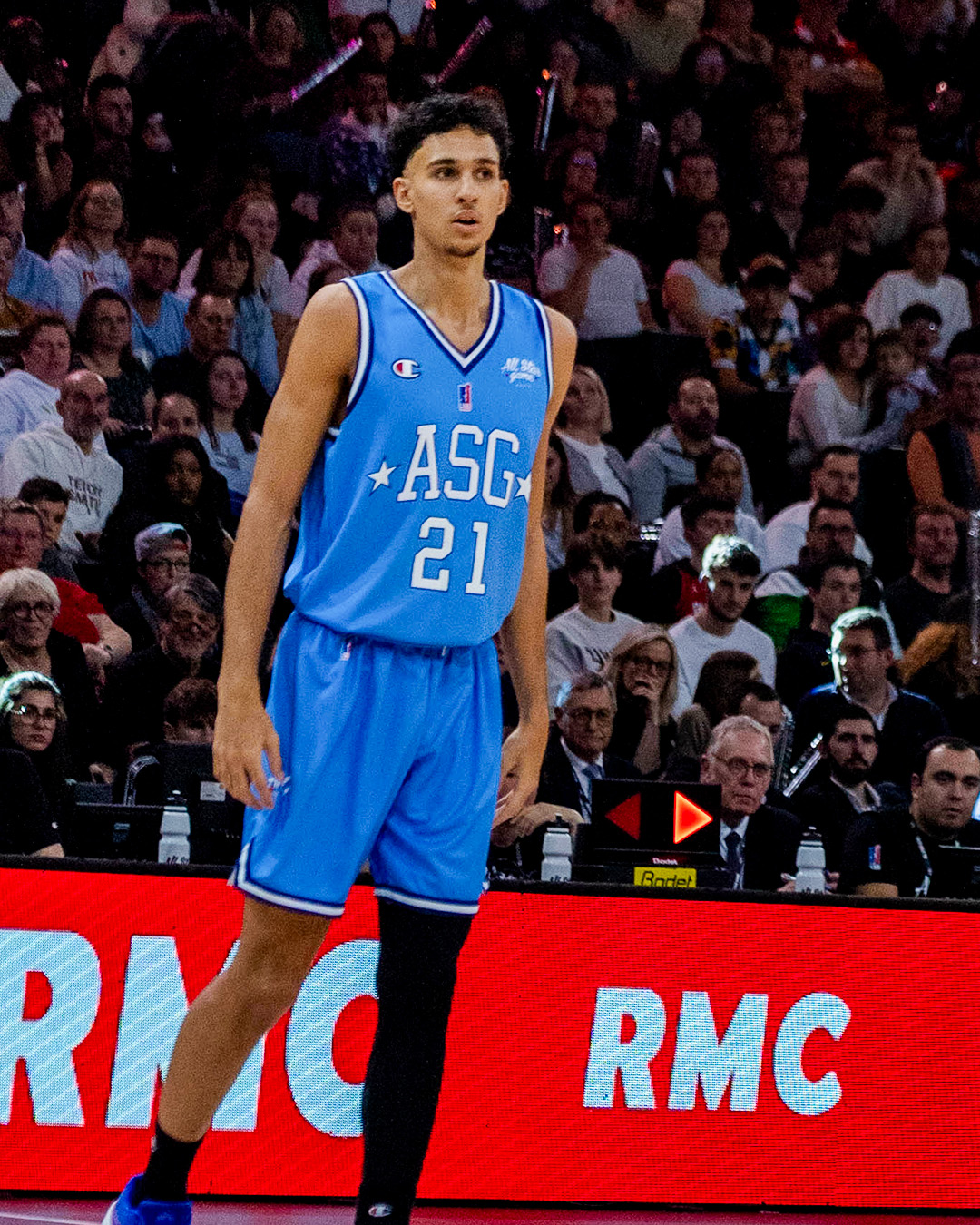
Zaccharie Risacher was selected 1st overall by the Atlanta Hawks.

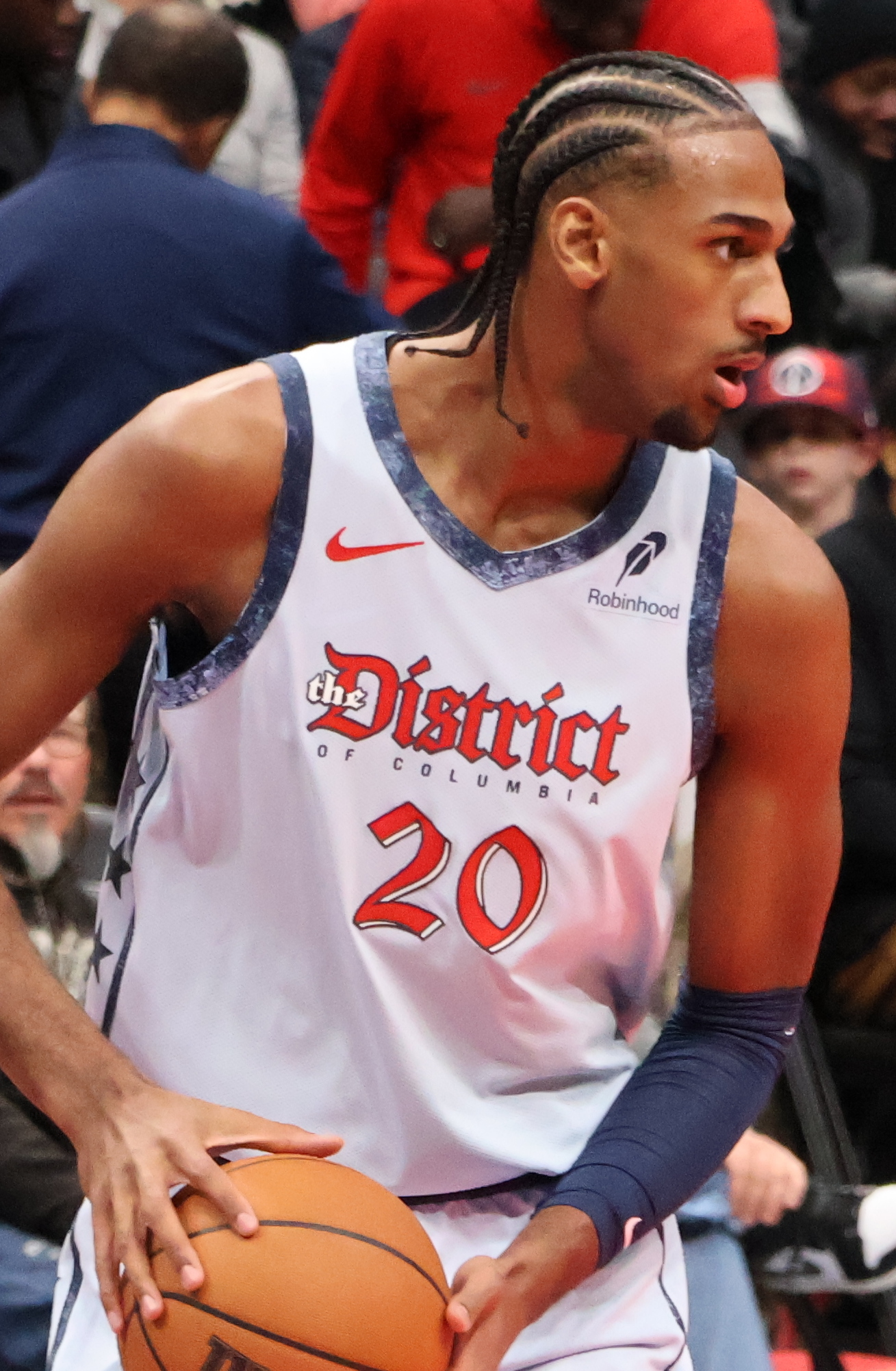
Alex Sarr was selected 2nd overall by the Washington Wizards.

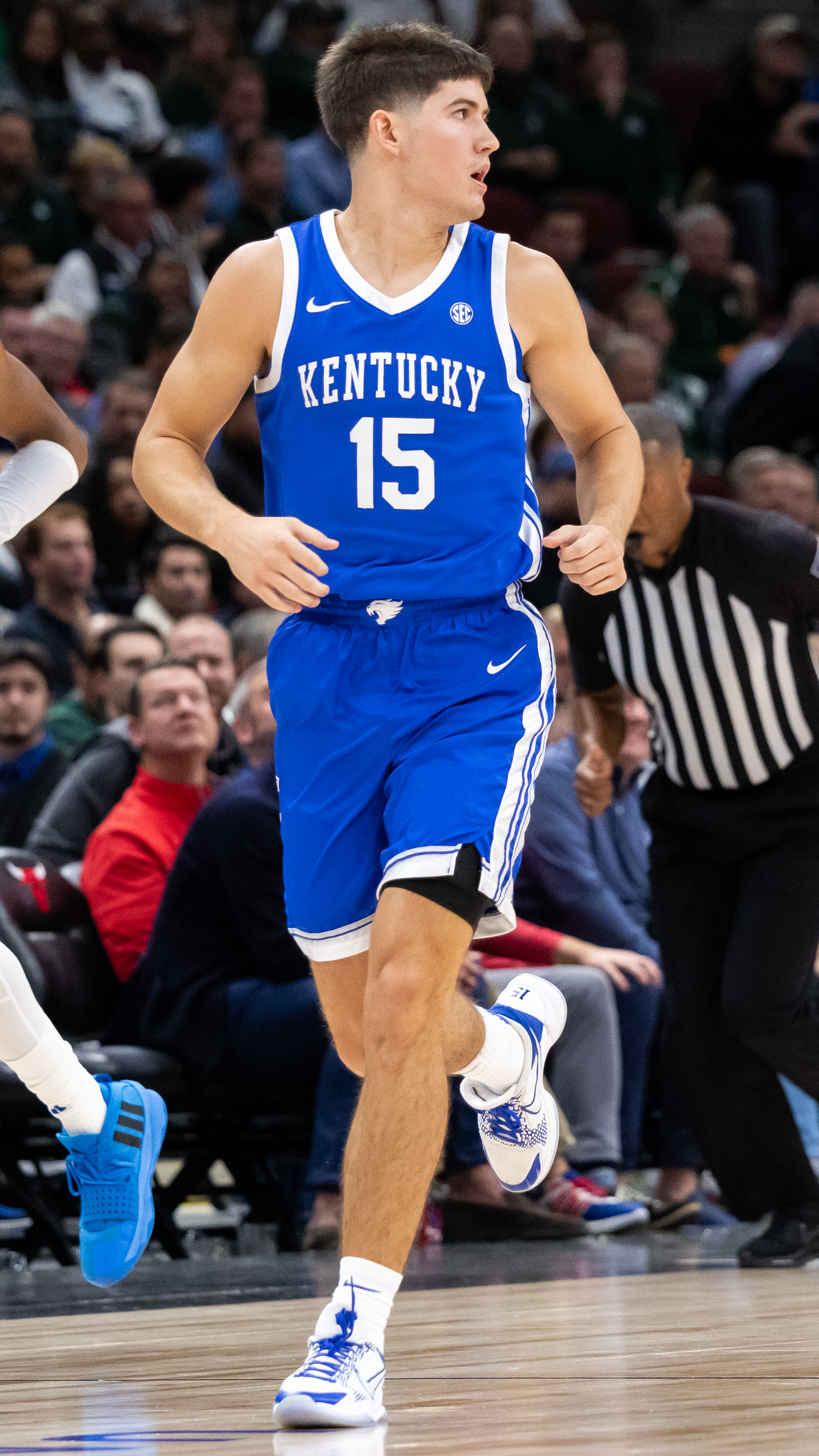
Reed Sheppard was selected 3rd overall by the Houston Rockets.

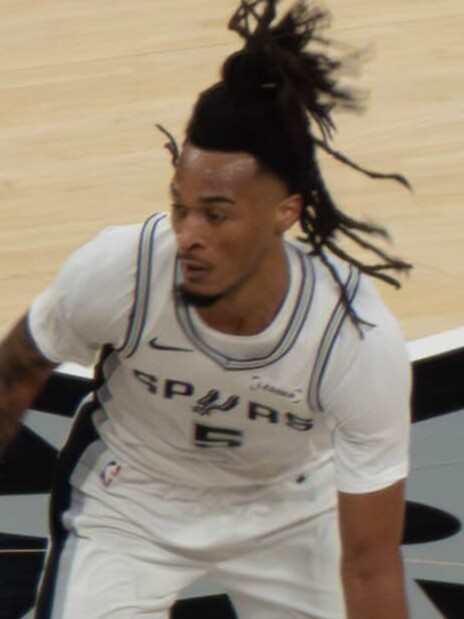
Stephon Castle was selected 4th overall by the San Antonio Spurs.

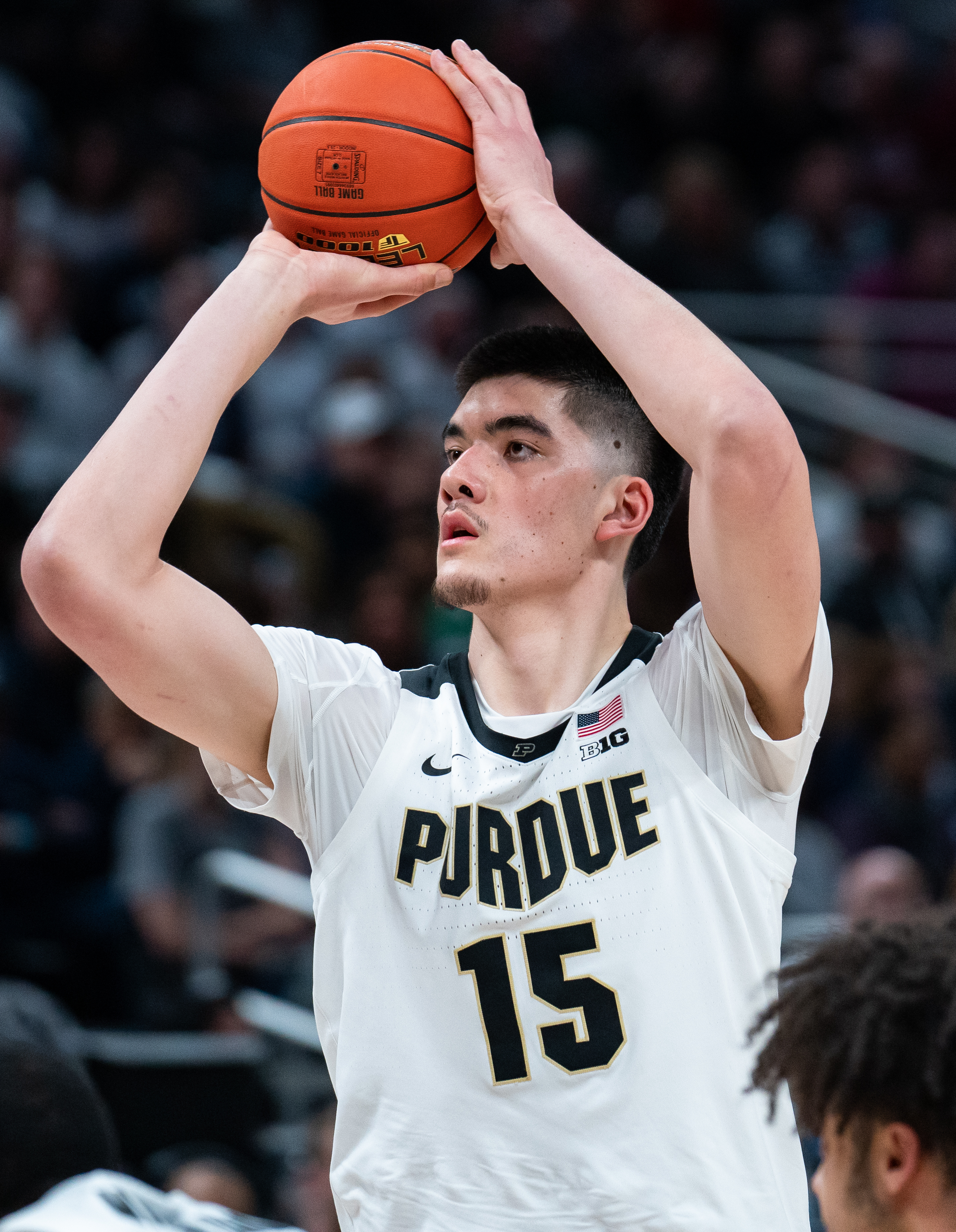
Zach Edey was selected 9th overall by the Memphis Grizzlies.

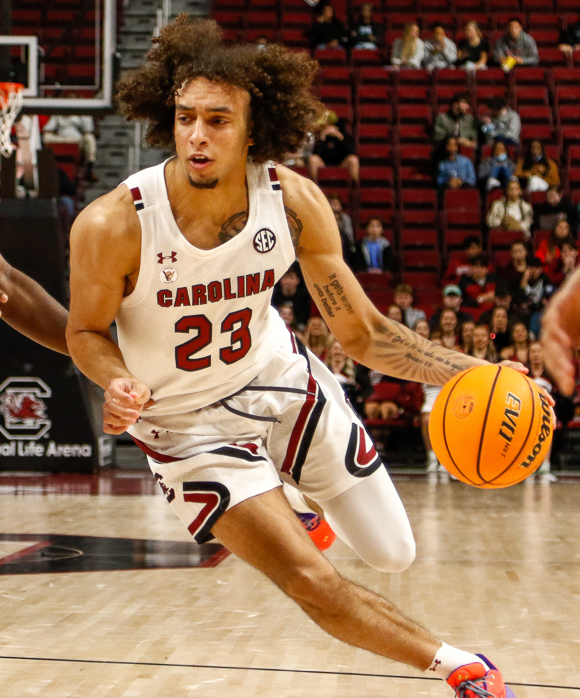
Devin Carter was selected 13th overall by the Sacramento Kings.

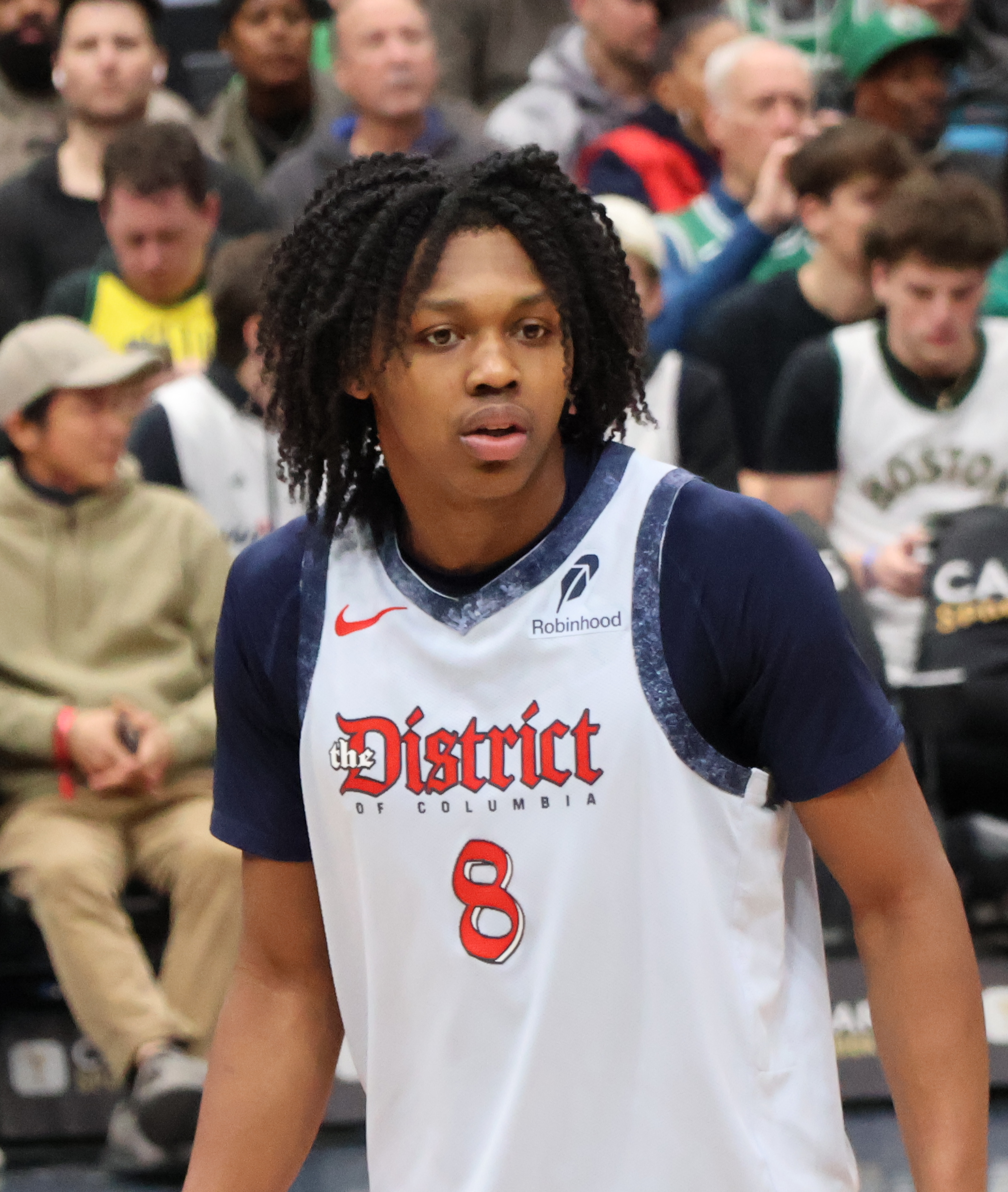
Bub Carrington was selected 14th overall by the Portland Trail Blazers (traded to the Washington Wizards).

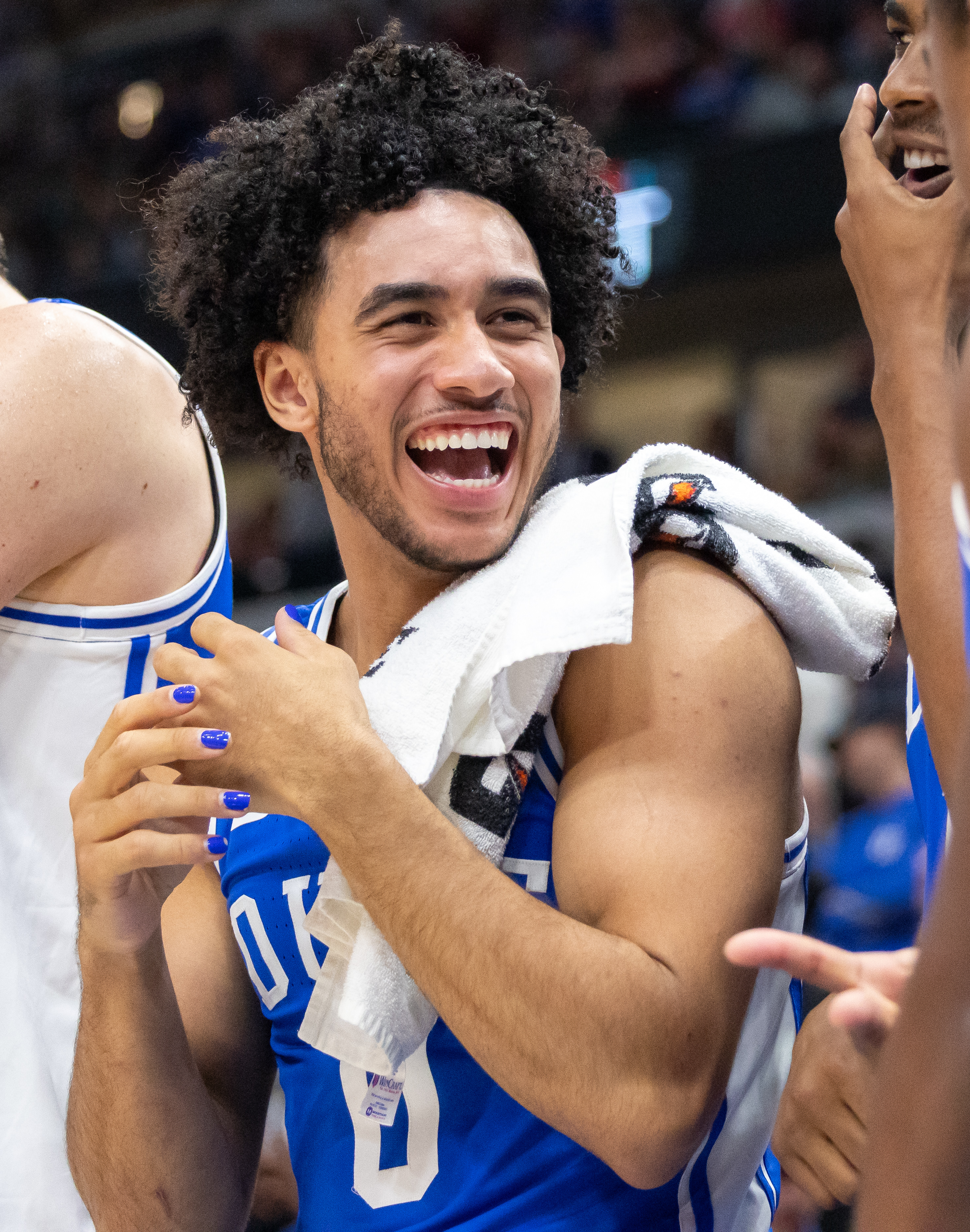
Jared McCain was selected 16th overall by the Philadelphia 76ers.

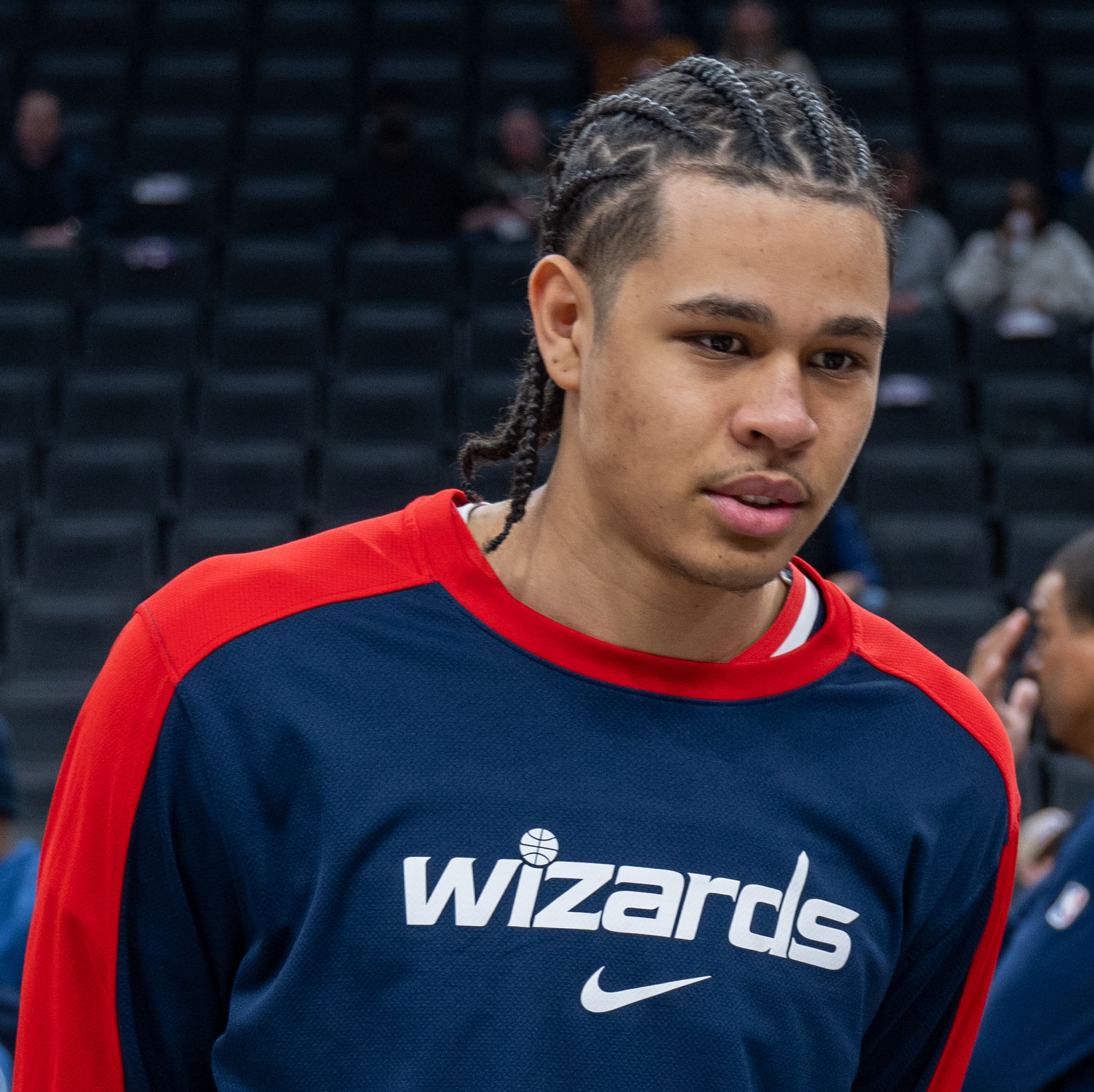
Kyshawn George was selected 24th overall by the New York Knicks (traded to the Washington Wizards).

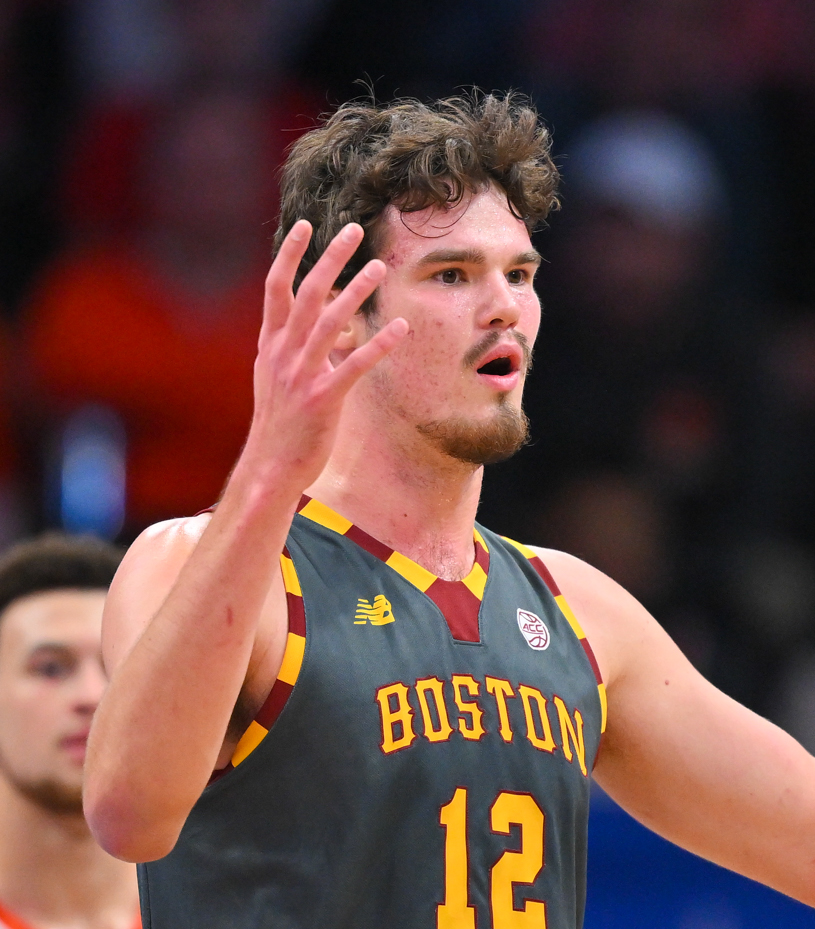
Quinten Post was selected 52nd overall by the Golden State Warriors (traded back to Golden State via the Portland Trail Blazers).

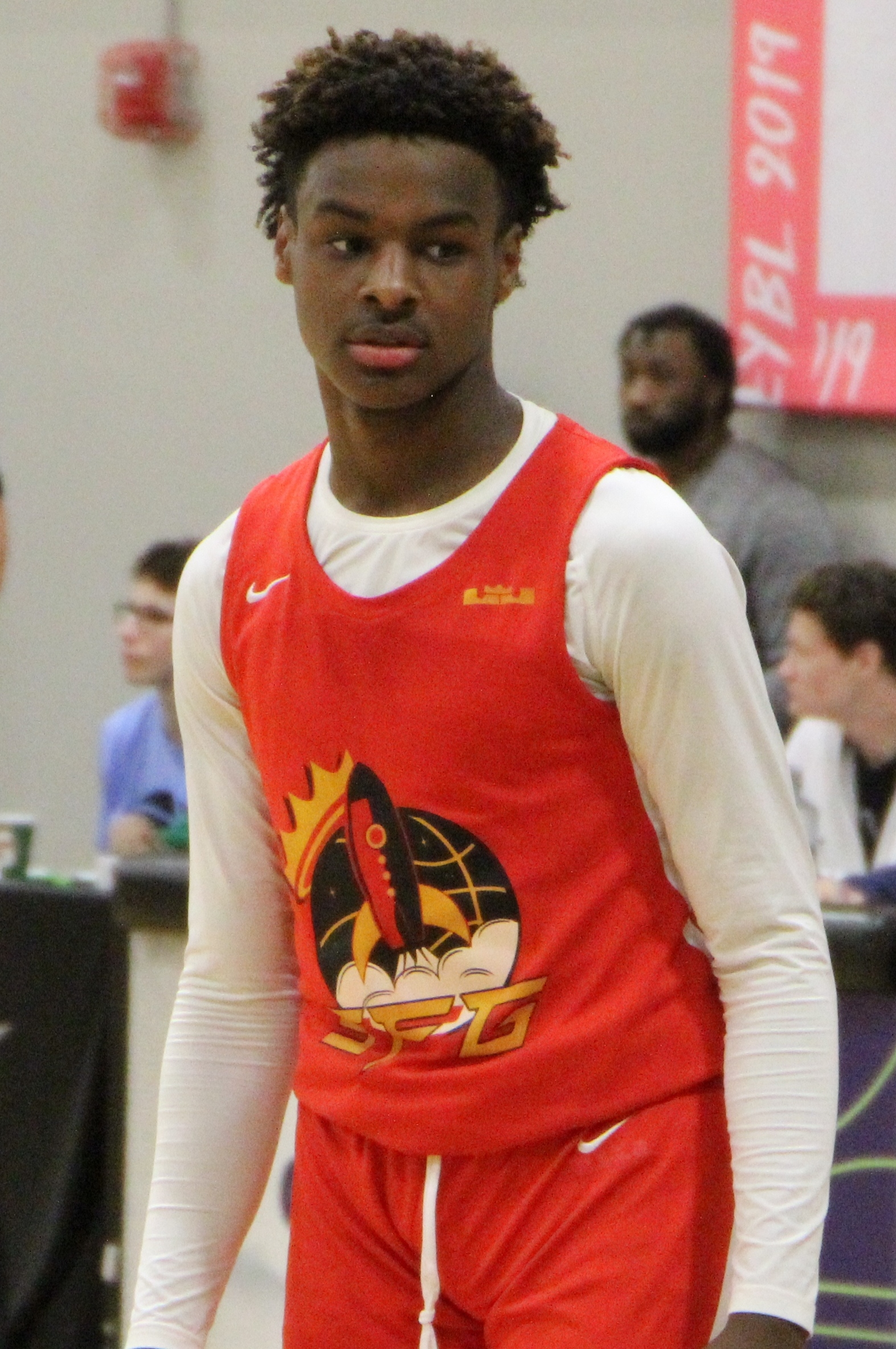
Bronny James was selected 55th overall by the Los Angeles Lakers.

Rnd.	Pick	Player	Pos.	Nationality (Note: Nationality indicates the player's national team or representative nationality. If a player has not competed at the international level, then the nationality indicates the national team which the player is eligible to represent according to FIBA rules.)	Team	School / club team
1	1	Zaccharie Risacher	SF	France	Atlanta Hawks	JL Bourg (France)
1	2	Alex Sarr	C	France	Washington Wizards	Perth Wildcats (Australia)
1	3	Reed Sheppard	SG/PG	United States	Houston Rockets (from Brooklyn) (Note: January 16, 2021: Brooklyn Nets to Houston Rockets (four-team trade with Cleveland and Indiana): Houston acquired Victor Oladipo, Dante Exum, Rodions Kurucs, 2022, 2024, and 2026 first-round selections, right to swap 2021, 2023, 2025, and 2027 first-round selections, and Milwaukee's 2022 first-round selection; Brooklyn acquired James Harden; Cleveland acquired Jarrett Allen and Taurean Prince; Indiana acquired Caris LeVert and 2 future second-round selections)	Kentucky (Fr.)
1	4	Stephon Castle^{~}	PG/SG	United States	San Antonio Spurs	UConn (Fr.)
1	5	Ron Holland	SF	United States	Detroit Pistons	NBA G League Ignite (NBA G League)
1	6	Tidjane Salaün	SF	France	Charlotte Hornets	Cholet Basket (France)
1	7	Donovan Clingan	C	United States	Portland Trail Blazers	UConn (So.)
1	8	Rob Dillingham	PG/SG	United States	San Antonio Spurs (from Toronto, (Note: February 9, 2023: Toronto Raptors to San Antonio Spurs: San Antonio acquired Khem Birch, a 2024 first-round pick, and 2023 and 2025 second-round picks; Toronto acquired Jakob Pöltl) traded to Minnesota) (Note: June 26, 2024: San Antonio Spurs to Minnesota Timberwolves: Minnesota acquired the draft rights to Rob Dillingham (No. 8); San Antonio acquired Minnesota's 2031 first-round pick, and the right to swap 2030 first-round picks with Minnesota)	Kentucky (Fr.)
1	9	Zach Edey	C	Canada	Memphis Grizzlies	Purdue (Sr.)
1	10	Cody Williams	SG/SF	United States	Utah Jazz	Colorado (Fr.)
1	11	Matas Buzelis	SF/PF	Lithuania (Note: Buzelis was born in the United States and is of Lithuanian descent. He holds dual citizenship but has played for the Lithuanian national team.)	Chicago Bulls	NBA G League Ignite (NBA G League)
1	12	Nikola Topić	PG	Serbia	Oklahoma City Thunder (from Houston) (Note: July 16, 2019: Houston Rockets to Oklahoma City Thunder: Oklahoma City acquired Chris Paul, 2024 and 2026 first-round picks, and right to swap 2021 and 2025 first-round selections; Houston acquired Russell Westbrook)	KK Crvena zvezda (Serbia)
1	13	Devin Carter	SG	United States	Sacramento Kings	Providence (Jr.)
1	14	Bub Carrington	SG	United States	Portland Trail Blazers (from Golden State to Memphis to Boston, (Note: July 7, 2019: Golden State Warriors to Memphis Grizzlies: Memphis acquired Andre Iguodala, a 2024 first-round pick, and cash considerations; Golden State acquired Julian Washburn; June 23, 2023: Memphis Grizzlies to Boston Celtics (three-team trade with Washington): Boston acquired Kristaps Porziņģis, a 2023 first-round pick, and Golden State's 2024 first-round pick; Memphis acquired Marcus Smart; Washington acquired Tyus Jones, Danilo Gallinari, Mike Muscala, and Boston's 2023 second-round pick; October 1, 2023: Boston Celtics to Portland Trail Blazers: Portland acquired Robert Williams III, Malcolm Brogdon, Golden State's 2024 first-round pick, and a 2029 first-round pick; Boston acquired Jrue Holiday) traded to Washington) (Note: July 6, 2024: Portland Trail Blazers to Washington Wizards: Washington acquired Malcolm Brogdon, the draft rights to Bub Carrington (No. 14), a 2029 first-round pick, 2028 and 2030 second-round selections; Portland acquired Deni Avdija)	Pittsburgh (Fr.)
1	15	Kel'el Ware	C	United States	Miami Heat	Indiana (So.)
1	16	Jared McCain	SG	United States	Philadelphia 76ers	Duke (Fr.)
1	17	Dalton Knecht	SF	United States	Los Angeles Lakers (Note: New Orleans exercised its right to defer conveyance of this pick until 2025.)	Tennessee (Sr.)
1	18	Tristan da Silva	PF	Germany; Brazil	Orlando Magic	Colorado (Sr.)
1	19	Ja'Kobe Walter	SG	United States	Toronto Raptors (from Indiana) (Note: January 17, 2024: Indiana Pacers to Toronto Raptors (three-team trade with New Orleans): Toronto acquired Bruce Brown Jr., Jordan Nwora, Kira Lewis Jr., Indiana's 2024 first-round pick, the least favorable of Utah's, L.A. Clippers', Houston's, and Oklahoma City's 2024 first-round picks and a protected 2026 first-round pick; Indiana acquired Pascal Siakam and New Orleans' 2024 second-round pick; New Orleans acquired cash considerations)	Baylor (Fr.)
1	20	Jaylon Tyson	SF	United States	Cleveland Cavaliers	California (Jr.)
1	21	Yves Missi	C	Cameroon	New Orleans Pelicans (from Milwaukee) (Note: November 24, 2020: Milwaukee Bucks to New Orleans Pelicans (four-team trade with Oklahoma City and Denver): New Orleans acquired Steven Adams, Eric Bledsoe, 2025 and 2027 first-round selections, and right to swap 2024 and 2026 first-round selections with Milwaukee; Milwaukee acquired Jrue Holiday and the draft rights to Sam Merrill; Denver acquired the draft rights to R. J. Hampton; Oklahoma City acquired George Hill, Zylan Cheatham, Josh Gray, Darius Miller, and Kenrich Williams, a future first-round selection from Denver, and second-round selections from New Orleans (2023 via Washington and 2024 via Charlotte))	Baylor (Fr.)
1	22	DaRon Holmes II	PF	United States	Phoenix Suns (traded to Denver) (Note: June 26, 2024: Phoenix Suns to Denver Nuggets: Denver acquired the draft rights to DaRon Holmes II (No. 22); Phoenix acquired the draft rights to Ryan Dunn (No. 28), the 56th pick in the 2024 draft, 2026 and 2031 second-round selections)	Dayton (Jr.)
1	23	AJ Johnson	SG	United States	Milwaukee Bucks (from New Orleans)	Illawarra Hawks (Australia)
1	24	Kyshawn George	SG	Switzerland (Note: George was born in Switzerland and holds Canadian citizenship by descent through his Canadian father. He holds dual citizenship but has played for the Swiss national team at the U16 level.)	New York Knicks (from Dallas, (Note: January 31, 2019: Dallas Mavericks to New York Knicks: New York acquired DeAndre Jordan, Dennis Smith Jr., Wesley Matthews, and two future first-round picks; Dallas acquired Kristaps Porziņģis, Tim Hardaway Jr., Trey Burke, and Courtney Lee) traded to Washington) (Note: June 26, 2024 (between rounds): New York Knicks to Washington Wizards: Washington acquired the draft rights to Kyshawn George (No. 24); New York acquired the draft rights to Dillon Jones (No. 26) and the 51st pick in the 2024 draft (used to select Melvin Ajinça))	Miami (Fr.)
1	25	Pacôme Dadiet	SF	France	New York Knicks	Ratiopharm Ulm (Germany)
1	26	Dillon Jones	SF	United States	Washington Wizards (from L.A. Clippers to Oklahoma City to Dallas, (Note: July 19, 2019: Los Angeles Clippers to Oklahoma City Thunder: Oklahoma City acquired Shai Gilgeous-Alexander, Danilo Gallinari, 2022, 2024, and 2026 first-round selections, Miami's 2021 and 2023 first-round selections, and right to swap 2023 and 2025 first-round picks; L. A. Clippers acquired Paul George; February 8, 2024: Oklahoma City Thunder to Dallas Mavericks: Dallas acquired a 2024 first-round selection; Oklahoma City acquired the right to swap 2028 first-round picks; February 8, 2024: Dallas Mavericks to Washington Wizards: Washington acquired Richaun Holmes and a 2024 first-round selection; Dallas acquired Daniel Gafford) traded to Oklahoma City via New York) (Note: June 26, 2024: New York Knicks to Oklahoma City Thunder: Oklahoma City acquired the draft rights to Dillon Jones; New York acquired five future second-round selections)	Weber State (Sr.)
1	27	Terrence Shannon Jr.	SG	United States	Minnesota Timberwolves	Illinois (Sr.)
1	28	Ryan Dunn	SF	United States	Denver Nuggets (traded to Phoenix)	Virginia (So.)
1	29	Isaiah Collier	PG	United States	Utah Jazz (from Oklahoma City to Indiana to Toronto) (Note: June 23, 2023: Oklahoma City Thunder to Indiana Pacers (four-team trade with Denver and L.A. Lakers): Indiana acquired the draft rights to Mojave King, the least favorable of Oklahoma City's four 2024 first-round picks, and cash considerations; Oklahoma City acquired a 2029 first-round pick; Denver acquired the draft rights to Julian Strawther, the draft rights to Jalen Pickett, the draft rights to Hunter Tyson, and a 2024 second-round pick; L.A. Lakers acquired the draft rights to Maxwell Lewis) (Note: February 9, 2024: Toronto Raptors to Utah Jazz: Utah acquired Kira Lewis Jr., Otto Porter Jr., and the least favorable of Utah's, L.A. Clippers', Houston's, and Oklahoma City's 2024 first-round picks; Toronto acquired Kelly Olynyk and Ochai Agbaji)	USC (Fr.)
1	30	Baylor Scheierman	SG/SF	United States	Boston Celtics	Creighton (Sr.)
2	31	Jonathan Mogbo	PF	United States	Toronto Raptors (from Detroit to L.A. Clippers to New York) (Note: November 19, 2020: Detroit Pistons to Los Angeles Clippers (three-team trade with Brooklyn): L.A. Clippers acquired the draft rights to Jay Scrubb, Luke Kennard, Justin Patton, Portland's 2023 second-round pick, and Detroit's 2024, 2025, and 2026 second-round picks; Detroit acquired the draft rights to Saddiq Bey, Džanan Musa, the draft rights to Jaylen Hands, Rodney McGruder, Toronto's 2021 second-round pick, and cash considerations; Brooklyn acquired Landry Shamet, Bruce Brown, and the draft rights to Reggie Perry; July 29, 2021: Los Angeles Clippers to New York Knicks: New York acquired the draft rights to Quentin Grimes and a future second-round pick; L.A. Clippers acquired the draft rights to Keon Johnson; December 30, 2023: New York Knicks to Toronto Raptors: Toronto acquired Immanuel Quickley, RJ Barrett, and a 2024 second-round pick; New York acquired OG Anunoby, Precious Achiuwa, and Malachi Flynn)	San Francisco (Jr.)
2	32	Kyle Filipowski	PF/C	United States	Utah Jazz (from Washington to Brooklyn to Detroit) (Note: August 6, 2021: Washington Wizards to Brooklyn Nets (five-team trade with L.A. Lakers, San Antonio, and Indiana): Brooklyn acquired the draft rights to Nikola Milutinov, a 2024 second-round pick, and the option to swap 2025 second-round picks with Washington; L.A. Lakers acquired Russell Westbrook and 2023, 2024, and 2028 second-round picks; Indiana acquired the draft rights to Isaiah Jackson; Washington acquired Spencer Dinwiddie, Aaron Holiday, Kentavious Caldwell-Pope, Kyle Kuzma, Montrezl Harrell, the draft rights to forward Isaiah Todd, and cash considerations from Indiana; San Antonio acquired a 2022 second-round pick and Chandler Hutchison) (Note: September 3, 2021: Brooklyn Nets to Detroit Pistons: Detroit acquired DeAndre Jordan, 2022, 2024 (via Washington), 2025 (via Golden State), and 2027 second-round picks, and cash considerations; Brooklyn acquired Sekou Doumbouya and Jahlil Okafor; February 8, 2024: Detroit Pistons to Utah Jazz: Utah acquired Kevin Knox II, the rights to Gabriele Procida, and a 2024 second-round pick; Detroit acquired Simone Fontecchio)	Duke (So.)
2	33	Tyler Smith	SF/PF	United States	Milwaukee Bucks (from Portland via Sacramento) (Note: January 20, 2020: Portland Trail Blazers to Sacramento Kings: Sacramento acquired Kent Bazemore, Anthony Tolliver, 2024 and 2025 second-round selections; Portland acquired Trevor Ariza, Wenyen Gabriel, and Caleb Swanigan; February 10, 2022: Sacramento to Milwaukee (four-team trade with L.A. Clippers and Detroit: Milwaukee acquired Serge Ibaka, 2023 and 2024 second-round selections, and cash considerations; Sacramento acquired Donte DiVincenzo, Josh Jackson, Trey Lyles, the draft rights to David Michineau; L.A. Clippers acquired Rodney Hood, Semi Ojeleye, the draft rights to Vanja Marinković; Detroit acquired Marvin Bagley III)	NBA G League Ignite (NBA G League)
2	34	Tyler Kolek	PG	United States	Portland Trail Blazers (from Charlotte via New Orleans, Oklahoma City, and Denver, (Note: November 18, 2020: Charlotte Hornets to New Orleans Pelicans: New Orleans acquired a 2024 second-round pick; Charlotte acquired the draft rights to Nick Richards) (Note: June 23, 2022: Oklahoma City Thunder to Denver Nuggets: Denver acquired the draft rights to Peyton Watson and two future second-round picks; Oklahoma City acquired JaMychal Green and a 2027 protected first-round pick) (Note: June 23, 2022: Denver Nuggets to Portland Trail Blazers: Portland acquired a 2024 second-round pick; Denver acquired the draft rights to Ismaël Kamagate) traded to New York) (Note: June 27, 2024: Portland Trail Blazers to New York Knicks: New York acquired the draft rights to Tyler Kolek; Portland acquired 2027, 2029, and 2030 second-round picks and the draft rights to Dani Díez)	Marquette (Sr.)
2	35	Johnny Furphy	SG/SF	Australia	San Antonio Spurs (traded to Indiana) (Note: July 6, 2024: San Antonio Spurs to Indiana Pacers: Indiana acquired the draft rights to Johnny Furphy; San Antonio acquired the draft rights to Juan Núñez and cash considerations)	Kansas (Fr.)
2	36	Juan Núñez^{#}	PG	Spain	Indiana Pacers (from Toronto to Memphis to L.A. Clippers to Philadelphia, (Note: November 18, 2020: Toronto Raptors to Memphis Grizzlies: Memphis acquired Jonas Valančiūnas, Delon Wright, C. J. Miles, and a 2024 second-round pick; Toronto acquired Marc Gasol) (Note: February 9, 2023: Memphis Grizzlies to Los Angeles Clippers (three-team trade with Houston): L.A. Clippers acquired Eric Gordon and three second-round picks; Memphis acquired Luke Kennard; Houston acquired John Wall, Danny Green, and the right to swap Milwaukee's 2023 first-round pick with L.A.'s 2023 first-round pick) (Note: November 1, 2023: Los Angeles Clippers to Philadelphia 76ers (three-team trade with Oklahoma City): Philadelphia acquired Nicolas Batum, Robert Covington, Kenyon Martin Jr., Marcus Morris Sr., 2026 and 2028 first-round selections, the right to swap 2029 draft selections with L.A., 2024 and 2029 second-round selections, and cash considerations; L.A. Clippers acquired James Harden, Filip Petrušev, and P. J. Tucker; Oklahoma City acquired the right to swap 2027 first-round picks with L.A.; February 8, 2024: Philadelphia 76ers to Indiana Pacers (three-team trade with San Antonio): Indiana acquired Doug McDermott, Furkan Korkmaz, 2024 and 2029 second-round selections, and cash considerations; Philadelphia acquired Buddy Hield; San Antonio acquired Marcus Morris Sr., a 2029 second-round pick, and cash considerations.) traded to San Antonio)	Ratiopharm Ulm (Germany)
2	37	Bobi Klintman	SF/PF	Sweden	Minnesota Timberwolves (from Memphis to Oklahoma City to Washington to L.A. Lakers, (Note: July 6, 2019: Memphis Grizzlies to Oklahoma City Thunder: Oklahoma City acquired the drafts rights to Darius Bazley and a 2024 second-round pick; Memphis acquired the draft rights to Brandon Clarke; November 19, 2020: Oklahoma City Thunder to Washington Wizards: Washington acquired the draft rights to Cassius Winston and a 2024 second-round pick; Oklahoma City acquired Admiral Schofield and the draft rights to Vít Krejčí) (Note: July 6, 2019: Los Angeles Lakers to Minnesota Timberwolves (three-team trade with Utah): Minnesota acquired Mike Conley Jr., Nickeil Alexander-Walker, Utah's 2025 and 2026 second-round picks, L.A.'s 2024 second round pick; L.A. Lakers acquired Jarred Vanderbilt, Malik Beasley, and D'Angelo Russell; Utah acquired Russell Westbrook, Juan Toscano-Anderson, Damian Jones, and L.A.'s 2027 first-round pick) traded to Detroit) (Note: July 6, 2024: Minnesota Timberwolves to Detroit Pistons: Detroit acquired Wendell Moore Jr. and the draft rights to Bobi Klintman; Minnesota acquired the draft rights to Cam Spencer)	Cairns Taipans (Australia)
2	38	Ajay Mitchell	PG/SG	Belgium	New York Knicks (from Utah, (Note: November 23, 2020: Utah Jazz to New York Knicks: New York acquired Ed Davis and two future second-round selections; Utah received cash considerations) traded to Oklahoma City) (Note: June 28, 2024: New York Knicks to Oklahoma City Thunder (four-team trade with Portland and Golden State): Oklahoma City acquired the draft rights to Ajay Mitchell; New York acquired the draft rights to Oso Ighodaro and cash considerations; Portland acquired the draft rights to Quinten Post and cash considerations; Golden State acquired Lindy Waters III)	UC Santa Barbara (Jr.)
2	39	Jaylen Wells	SF	United States	Memphis Grizzlies (from Brooklyn via Houston) (Note: October 6, 2021: Brooklyn Nets to Houston Rockets: Houston acquired Sekou Doumbouya and a 2024 second-round pick; Brooklyn received cash considerations) (Note: February 1, 2024: Houston Rockets to Memphis Grizzlies: Memphis acquired Victor Oladipo and three future second-round picks; Houston received Steven Adams)	Washington State (Jr.)
2	40	Oso Ighodaro	PF/C	United States	Portland Trail Blazers (from Atlanta, (Note: February 9, 2023: Atlanta Hawks to Portland Trail Blazers (four-team trade with Golden State and Detroit: Portland acquired Kevin Knox II, and 2023, 2024, 2025, 2026, and 2028 second-round picks; Atlanta acquired Saddiq Bey; Golden State acquired Gary Payton II, 2026 and 2028 second-round picks; Detroit acquired James Wiseman) traded to Phoenix via New York) (Note: June 27, 2024: New York Knicks to Phoenix Suns: Phoenix acquired the draft rights to Oso Ighodaro; New York acquired the draft rights to Kevin McCullar Jr. and a future second-round pick)	Marquette (Sr.)
2	41	Adem Bona	PF/C	Turkey	Philadelphia 76ers (from Chicago to New Orleans to San Antonio to Boston) (Note: August 8, 2021: Chicago Bulls to New Orleans Pelicans: New Orleans acquired Tomáš Satoranský, Garrett Temple, a 2024 second-round pick, and cash considerations; Chicago acquired Lonzo Ball; February 9, 2023: New Orleans Pelicans to San Antonio Spurs: San Antonio acquired Devonte' Graham and four future second-round selections; New Orleans acquired Josh Richardson; July 12, 2023: San Antonio Spurs to Boston Celtics (three-team trade with Dallas): Boston acquired 2024 and 2030 second-round picks, and the right to swap 2025 second-round picks with Dallas; San Antonio acquired Reggie Bullock and the right to swap 2030 first-round picks with Dallas; Dallas acquired Grant Williams and 2025 and 2028 second-round picks; February 8, 2024: Boston Celtics to Philadelphia 76ers: Philadelphia acquired a 2024 second-round pick; Boston acquired Jaden Springer)	UCLA (So.)
2	42	KJ Simpson	PG	United States	Charlotte Hornets (from Houston via Oklahoma City) (Note: July 12, 2023: Houston Rockets to Oklahoma City (five-team trade with Atlanta, L.A. Clippers, and Memphis): Oklahoma City acquired Patty Mills and 2024, 2029, and 2030 second-round picks; Houston acquired Dillon Brooks, the draft rights to Alpha Kaba, and two future second-round picks; Atlanta acquired Usman Garuba, TyTy Washington Jr., two future second-round picks, and cash considerations; L.A. Clippers acquired Kenyon Martin Jr.; Memphis acquired Josh Christopher; February 9, 2023: Oklahoma City to Charlotte Hornets: Charlotte acquired Dāvis Bertāns, Tre Mann, Vasilije Micić, and 2024 and 2025 second-round picks; Oklahoma City acquired Gordon Hayward)	Colorado (Jr.)
2	43	Nikola Đurišić^{#}	SG/SF	Serbia	Miami Heat (traded to Atlanta) (Note: June 28, 2024: Miami Heat to Atlanta Hawks (three-team trade with Houston): Atlanta acquired the draft rights to Nikola Đurišić; Miami acquired the draft rights to Pelle Larsson and cash considerations; Houston acquired AJ Griffin)	KK Mega Basket (Serbia)
2	44	Pelle Larsson	SG/SF	Sweden	Houston Rockets (from Golden State via Atlanta, (Note: June 20, 2019: Golden State Warriors to Atlanta Hawks: Atlanta acquired a 2024 second-round pick and cash considerations; Golden State acquired a 2019 second-round pick; February 5, 2020: Atlanta Hawks to Houston Rockets (four-team trade with Denver and Minnesota): Houston acquired Robert Covington, Jordan Bell, and Golden State's 2024 second-round pick; Atlanta acquired Clint Capela and Nenê; Denver acquired Keita Bates-Diop, Shabazz Napier, Noah Vonleh, Gerald Green, and a 2020 first-round pick; Minnesota acquired Malik Beasley, Juan Hernangómez, Jarred Vanderbilt, Evan Turner, and Brooklyn's lottery protected 2020 first-round pick (from Atlanta)) traded to Miami)	Arizona (Sr.)
2	45	Jamal Shead	PG	United States	Sacramento Kings (traded to Toronto) (Note: June 28, 2024: Sacramento Kings to Toronto Raptors: Toronto acquired Davion Mitchell, Sasha Vezenkov, the draft rights to Jamal Shead, and a 2025 second-round pick; Sacramento acquired Jalen McDaniels)	Houston (Sr.)
2	46	Cam Christie	SG	United States	Los Angeles Clippers (from Indiana to Milwaukee to Memphis) (Note: July 29, 2021: Indiana Pacers to Milwaukee Bucks: Milwaukee acquired the draft rights to Sandro Mamukelashvili and Georgios Kalaitzakis, and two future second-round picks; Indiana acquired the draft rights to Isaiah Todd; August 7, 2021: Milwaukee Bucks to Memphis Grizzlies: Memphis acquired Sam Merrill and two future second-round picks; Milwaukee acquired Grayson Allen)	Minnesota (Fr.)
2	47	Antonio Reeves	SG/SF	United States	Orlando Magic (traded to New Orleans) (Note: June 27, 2024: Orlando Magic to New Orleans Pelicans: New Orleans acquired the draft rights to Antonio Reeves; Orlando acquired the rights to swap 2030 and 2031 second-round picks)	Kentucky (Sr.)
2	48	Harrison Ingram	SF/PF	United States	San Antonio Spurs (from L.A. Lakers via Memphis) (Note: September 11, 2021: Los Angeles Lakers to Memphis Grizzlies: Memphis acquired Marc Gasol, a 2024 second-round pick, and cash considerations; L.A. Lakers acquired the draft rights to Wang Zhelin; June 23, 2022: Memphis Grizzlies to San Antonio Spurs: San Antonio acquired a 2024 second-round pick; Memphis acquired the draft rights to Kennedy Chandler)	North Carolina (Jr.)
2	Philadelphia 76ers (forfeited due to tampering violation)					
2	49	Tristen Newton	PG/SG	United States	Indiana Pacers (from Cleveland)	UConn (Sr.)
2	50	Enrique Freeman	SF/PF	United States; Puerto Rico	Indiana Pacers (from New Orleans)	Akron (Sr.)
2	51	Melvin Ajinça^{#}	SF	France	New York Knicks (from Phoenix via Washington, (Note: June 23, 2023: Phoenix Suns to Washington Wizards (three-team trade with Indiana Pacers): Washington acquired Chris Paul, Landry Shamet, the draft rights to Bilal Coulibaly, 2024, 2025, 2026, 2027, 2028, and 2030 second-round picks, the right to swap 2024, 2026, 2028, and 2030 first-round picks with Phoenix, and cash considerations; Phoenix acquired Bradley Beal, Jordan Goodwin, and Isaiah Todd; Indiana acquired the draft rights to Jarace Walker and two future second-round picks) traded to Dallas) (Note: June 27, 2024: New York Knicks to Dallas Mavericks: Dallas acquired the draft rights to Melvin Ajinça; New York acquired the draft rights to Ariel Hukporti, the draft rights to Petteri Koponen, and cash considerations)	Saint-Quentin BB (France)
2	52	Quinten Post	C	Netherlands	Golden State Warriors (from Milwaukee via Indiana, (Note: February 9, 2023: Milwaukee Bucks to Indiana Pacers (four-team trade with Brooklyn and Phoenix): Indiana acquired George Hill, Serge Ibaka, Jordan Nwora, three future second-round picks, and cash considerations; Milwaukee acquired Jae Crowder; Phoenix acquired Kevin Durant and T. J. Warren; Brooklyn acquired Mikal Bridges, Cameron Johnson, the draft rights to Juan Pablo Vaulet, 2023, 2025, 2027, and 2029 first-round picks, 2028 and 2029 second-round picks, and the right to swap 2028 first-round picks with Phoenix; February 8, 2024: Indiana Pacers to Golden State Warriors: Golden State Warriors acquired a 2024 second-round pick; Indiana acquired Cory Joseph and a 2025 protected second-round pick) traded back to Golden State via Portland) (Note: July 6, 2024: Portland Trail Blazers to Golden State Warriors: Golden State acquired the draft rights to Quinten Post; Portland acquired cash considerations)	Boston College (Sr.)
2	53	Cam Spencer	SG	United States	Detroit Pistons (from New York to Charlotte to Philadelphia, (Note: June 23, 2022: New York Knicks to Charlotte Hornets: Charlotte acquired a protected 2023 first-round selection, three 2023 second-round picks, and a 2024 second-round pick; New York acquired the draft rights to Jalen Duren; February 9, 2023: Charlotte Hornets to Philadelphia 76ers (four team trade with Portland and New York): Philadelphia acquired Jalen McDaniels, 2024 and 2029 second-round picks; Charlotte acquired Svi Mykhailiuk, 2023 and 2027 second-round picks; Portland acquired Cam Reddish, Matisse Thybulle, Ryan Arcidiacono, and a 2023 first-round pick; New York acquired Josh Hart; February 8, 2024: Philadelphia 76ers to Detroit Pistons: Detroit acquired Danuel House Jr., a 2024 second-round pick, and cash considerations; Philadelphia acquired a 2028 second-round pick) traded to Memphis via Minnesota)	UConn (Sr.)
2	54	Anton Watson	PF	United States	Boston Celtics (from Dallas via Sacramento) (Note: June 23, 2022: Dallas Mavericks to Sacramento Kings: Sacramento acquired 2024 and 2028 second-round picks; Dallas acquired the draft rights to Jaden Hardy; June 28, 2023: Sacramento Kings to Boston Celtics: Boston acquired the draft rights to Jordan Walsh and a 2024 second-round pick; Sacramento acquired the draft rights to Colby Jones)	Gonzaga (Sr.)
2	55	Bronny James	SG	United States	Los Angeles Lakers (from L.A. Clippers) (Note: February 10, 2023: Los Angeles Clippers to Los Angeles Lakers (four-team trade with Denver and Orlando): L.A. Lakers acquired Mo Bamba, Davon Reed, and 2024 and 2025 second-round picks; L.A. Clippers acquired Bones Hyland; Denver acquired Thomas Bryant; Orlando acquired Patrick Beverley, a 2024 second-round pick, and cash considerations)	USC (Fr.)
2	56	Kevin McCullar Jr.	SG	United States	Phoenix Suns (from Minnesota via Oklahoma City and Denver, (Note: November 20, 2020: Minnesota Timberwolves to Oklahoma City Thunder: Oklahoma City acquired James Johnson, the draft rights to Aleksej Pokuševski, and a 2024 second-round pick; Minnesota acquired Ricky Rubio and the draft rights to Jaden McDaniels) traded to New York)	Kansas (Sr.)
2	57	Ulrich Chomche	PF/C	Cameroon	Memphis Grizzlies (from Oklahoma City to Atlanta to Houston, (Note: July 25, 2018: Oklahoma City Thunder to Atlanta Hawks (three-team trade with Philadelphia): Atlanta acquired Carmelo Anthony, Justin Anderson, and a protected 2022 first-round pick (protected top 14 in 2022, else 2024 and 2025 second-round picks); Oklahoma City acquired Dennis Schröder and Timothé Luwawu-Cabarrot; Philadelphia acquired Mike Muscala; February 9, 2023: Atlanta Hawks to Houston Rockets: Houston acquired Justin Holiday, Frank Kaminsky, and two future second-round picks; Atlanta acquired Bruno Fernando and Garrison Mathews) traded to Toronto via Minnesota) (Note: July 6, 2024: Minnesota Timberwolves to Toronto Raptors: Toronto acquired the draft rights to Ulrich Chomche; Minnesota acquired cash considerations)	APR BBC (Rwanda)
2	Phoenix Suns (from Denver via Orlando; (Note: July 18, 2023: Orlando Magic to Phoenix Suns: Phoenix acquired 2024, 2026, and 2028 second-round picks; Orlando acquired the right to swap 2026 first-round picks) forfeited due to tampering violation)					
2	58	Ariel Hukporti	C	Germany	Dallas Mavericks (from Boston via Charlotte, (Note: November 29, 2020: Boston Celtics to Charlotte Hornets: Charlotte acquired Gordon Hayward and 2023 and 2024 second-round picks; Boston acquired a protected 2022 second-round pick; February 9, 2024: Charlotte Hornets to Dallas Mavericks: Dallas acquired P. J. Washington and 2024 and 2028 second-round picks; Charlotte acquired Grant Williams, Seth Curry, and a 2027 first-round pick) traded to New York)	MHP Riesen Ludwigsburg (Germany)

== Notable undrafted players ==
These players were not selected in the 2024 NBA draft, but have played at least one regular-season or playoff game in the NBA.

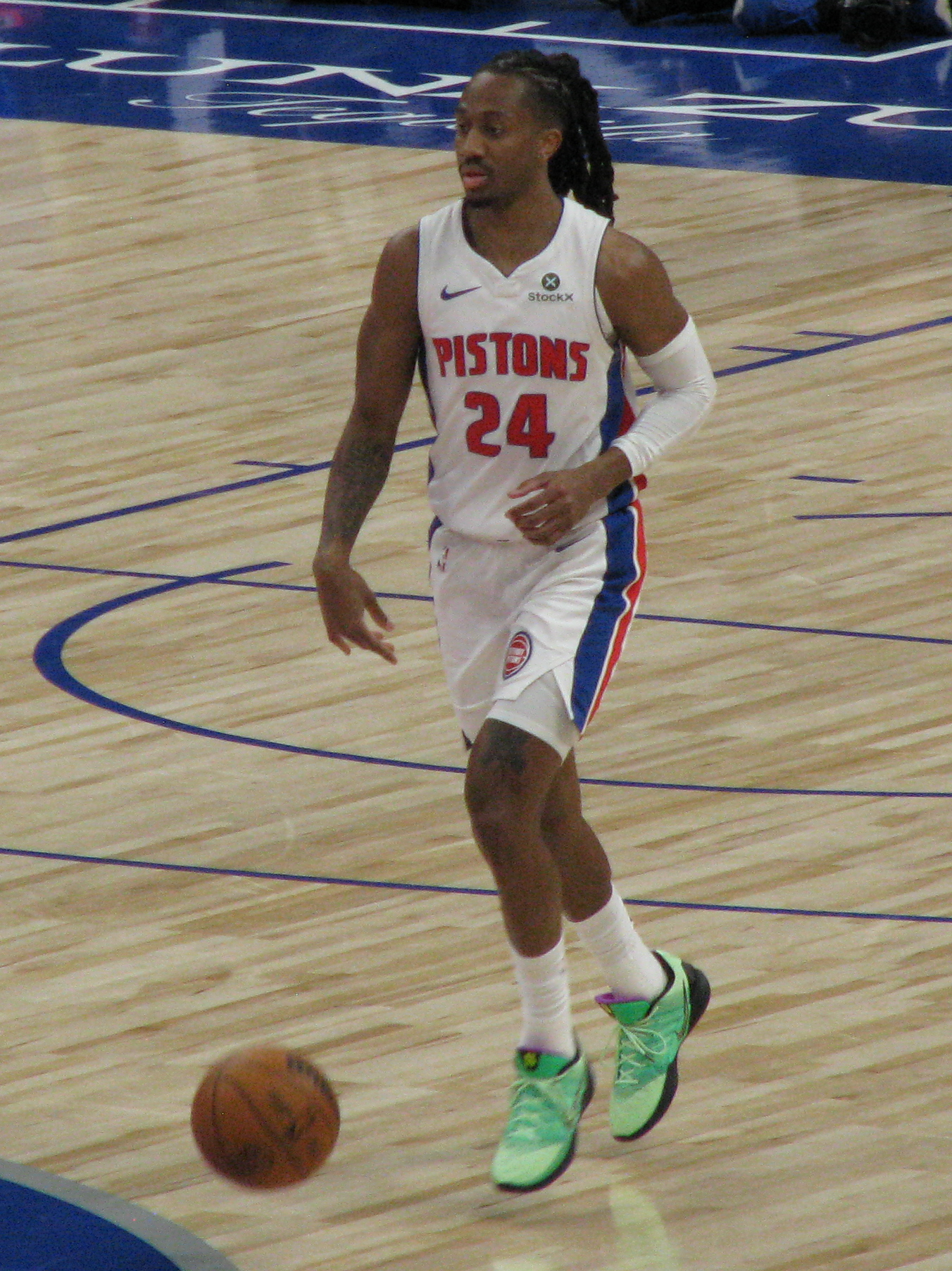
Daniss Jenkins went undrafted.

Player	Pos.	Nationality	School/club team
Trey Alexander	SG	United States	Creighton (Jr.)
Jamison Battle	SF	United States	Ohio State (Sr.)
Reece Beekman	PG	United States	Virginia (Sr.)
Jalen Bridges	SF	United States	Baylor (Sr.)
Keion Brooks Jr.	SF/PF	United States	Washington (Sr.)
Darius Brown	PG/SG	United States	Utah State (Sr.)
Tyler Burton	SF	United States	Villanova (Sr.)
Branden Carlson	C	United States	Utah (Sr.)
Isaiah Crawford	SF	United States	Louisiana Tech (Sr.)
Cui Yongxi	SG	China	Guangzhou Loong Lions (China)
N'Faly Dante	C	Mali	Oregon (Sr.)
RayJ Dennis	PG	United States	Baylor (Sr.)
Alex Ducas	SG/SF	Australia	Saint Mary's (Sr.)
Jesse Edwards	C	Netherlands	West Virginia (Sr.)
Justin Edwards	SF	United States	Kentucky (Fr.)
Tristan Enaruna	SF	Netherlands	Cleveland State (Sr.)
Trentyn Flowers	SF	United States	Adelaide 36ers (Australia)
PJ Hall	C	United States	Clemson (Sr.)
Blake Hinson	SF	United States	Pittsburgh (Sr.)
Daniss Jenkins	PG	United States	St. John's (Sr.)
Keshad Johnson	SF	United States	Arizona (Sr.)
Isaac Jones	C/PF	United States	Washington State (Sr.)
Spencer Jones	SF	United States	Stanford (Sr.)
David Jones García	SF	Dominican Republic	Memphis (Sr.)
Malevy Leons	PF	Netherlands	Bradley (Sr.)
Emanuel Miller	SF/PF	Canada	TCU (Sr.)
Riley Minix	SF/SG	United States	Morehead State (Sr.)
Josh Oduro	PF/C	United States	Providence (Sr.)
Quincy Olivari	PG	United States	Xavier (Sr.)
Zyon Pullin	PG	United States	Florida (Sr.)
Cormac Ryan	SG	United States	North Carolina (Sr.)
Tolu Smith	PF	United States	Mississippi State (Sr.)
Isaiah Stevens	PG	United States	Colorado State (Sr.)
Nae'Qwan Tomlin	PF	United States	Kansas State (Sr.)
Armel Traoré	SF	France	ADA Blois (France)
Jahmir Young	PG	United States	Maryland (Sr.)

== Trades involving draft picks ==
=== Pre-draft trades ===
Prior to the draft, the following trades were made and resulted in exchanges of draft picks between teams:

=== Post-draft trades ===
Post-draft trades are made after the draft begins. These trades are usually not confirmed until the next day or after free agency officially begins.

== Combine ==
The 10th G League Elite Camp took place on May 11–12, from which certain participants were selected to join the main draft combine.

The primary portion of the 2024 NBA Draft Combine was held from May 13–19 in Chicago, Illinois.

== Draft lottery ==
External videos
- 2024 NBA Draft Lottery Drawing, NBA's official YouTube channel. May 12, 2024.

The NBA draft lottery was held on May 12.

Denotes the actual lottery result

Team	2023–24 record	Lottery chances	Lottery probabilities													
Team	2023–24 record	Lottery chances	1st	2nd	3rd	4th	5th	6th	7th	8th	9th	10th	11th	12th	13th	14th
Detroit Pistons	14–68	140	14.0%	13.4%	12.7%	12.0%	47.9%	–	–	–	–	–	–	–	–	–
Washington Wizards	15–67	140	14.0%	13.4%	12.7%	12.0%	27.8%	20.0%	–	–	–	–	–	–	–	–
Charlotte Hornets	21–61	133	13.3%	12.9%	12.4%	11.7%	15.3%	27.1%	7.4%	–	–	–	–	–	–	–
Portland Trail Blazers	21–61	132	13.2%	12.8%	12.3%	11.7%	6.8%	24.6%	16.4%	2.2%	–	–	–	–	–	–
San Antonio Spurs	22–60	105	10.5%	10.5%	10.6%	10.5%	2.2%	19.6%	26.7%	8.7%	0.6%	–	–	–	–	–
Toronto Raptors (to San Antonio) (Note: San Antonio received the pick since it was outside the top 6. Toronto would have retained the pick had it stayed inside of the top 6.)	25–57	90	9.0%	9.2%	9.4%	9.6%	–	8.6%	29.8%	20.5%	3.7%	0.1%	–	–	–	–
Memphis Grizzlies	27–55	75	7.5%	7.8%	8.1%	8.5%	–	–	19.7%	34.1%	12.9%	1.3%	<0.1%	–	–	–
Utah Jazz (Note: Utah kept their pick since it was inside the top 10. Oklahoma City would have received the pick had it gone outside of the top 10.)	31–51	60	6.0%	6.3%	6.7%	7.2%	–	–	–	34.5%	32.1%	6.7%	0.4%	<0.1%	–	–
Brooklyn Nets (to Houston)	32–50	45	4.5%	4.8%	5.2%	5.7%	–	–	–	–	50.7%	25.9%	3.0%	0.1%	<0.1%	–
Atlanta Hawks	36–46	30	3.0%	3.3%	3.6%	4.0%	–	–	–	–	–	65.9%	19.0%	1.2%	<0.1%	<0.1%
Chicago Bulls	39–43	20	2.0%	2.2%	2.4%	2.8%	–	–	–	–	–	–	77.6%	12.6%	0.4%	<0.1%
Houston Rockets (to Oklahoma City) (Note: Oklahoma City received the pick since it was outside the top 4. Houston would have retained the pick had it moved up into the top 4.)	41–41	15	1.5%	1.7%	1.9%	2.1%	–	–	–	–	–	–	–	86.1%	6.7%	0.1%
Sacramento Kings	46–36	8	0.8%	0.9%	1.0%	1.1%	–	–	–	–	–	–	–	–	92.9%	3.3%
Golden State Warriors (to Portland) (Note: Portland received the pick since it was outside the top 4. Golden State would have retained the pick had it moved up into the top 4.)	46–36	7	0.7%	0.8%	0.9%	1.0%	–	–	–	–	–	–	–	–	–	96.6%

== Eligibility and entrants ==
The draft is conducted under the eligibility rules established in the league's 2017 collective bargaining agreement (CBA) with its players' union, with special modifications agreed to by both parties due to disruptions caused by the COVID-19 pandemic. The previous CBA that ended the 2011 lockout instituted no immediate changes to the draft, but it called for a committee of owners and players to discuss further changes.

- All drafted players must be at least 19 years old during the calendar year of the draft. In terms of dates, players who were eligible for the 2024 NBA draft must have been born on or before December 31, 2005.
- Since the 2016 draft, the following rules are, as implemented by the NCAA Division I council for that division:
  - Declaration for the draft no longer results in automatic loss of college eligibility. As long as a player does not sign a contract with a professional team outside the NBA or sign with an agent, he retains college eligibility as long as he makes a timely withdrawal from the draft.
  - NCAA players now have 10 days after the end of the NBA Draft Combine to withdraw from the draft. Since the combine is normally held in mid-May, the current deadline is about five weeks after the previous mid-April deadline.
  - NCAA players may participate in the draft combine and are allowed to attend one tryout per year with each NBA team without losing college eligibility.
  - NCAA players may now enter and withdraw from the draft up to two times without loss of eligibility. Previously, the NCAA treated a second declaration of draft eligibility as a permanent loss of college eligibility.

=== Early entrants ===
Players who were not automatically eligible had to declare their eligibility for the draft by notifying the NBA offices in writing no later than at least 60 days before the event. For the 2024 draft, the date fell on April 27. Under the CBA a player may withdraw his name from consideration from the draft at any time before the final declaration deadline, which usually falls 10 days before the draft at 5:00 pm EDT (2100 UTC). Under current NCAA rules, players usually have until 10 days after the draft combine to withdraw from the draft and retain college eligibility. They must have withdrawn on or before May 29, 22 days prior to this draft.

A player who has hired an agent for purposes of negotiating with professional teams (Note: Due to changes in rules regarding student athlete compensation in the 2020s, players can hire agents to manage appearances and endorsements while retaining college athletic eligibility.) retains his remaining college eligibility regardless of whether he is drafted after an evaluation from the NBA Undergraduate Advisory Committee. Players who declare for the NBA draft and are not selected have the opportunity to return to their school for at least another year only after terminating all agreements with their agents, (Note: Specifically agents hired to negotiate with professional teams. Relationships with agents hired for other purposes are not affected.) who must have been certified.

On May 2, 2024, 195 players were initially announced as early entry candidates. By May 31, 93 collegiate and Overtime Elite-based players withdrew from consideration; by June 16, 23 further international players met the international player deadline for withdrawing from the draft, leaving only 77 total early entrants for this year's draft. 53 players from college were either underclassmen or seniors with eligibility remaining for collegiate play, 18 players were from overseas leagues (including two American-born players playing overseas in Australia), and six players were from either the NBA G League (primarily via the NBA G League Ignite) or Overtime Elite as non-NBA domestic league options.

==== College underclassmen ====
- (United States) Trey Alexander – G, Creighton (junior)
- (United States) Mark Armstrong – G, Villanova (sophomore)
- (Turkey) Adem Bona – F/C, UCLA (sophomore)
- (United States) Bub Carrington – G, Pittsburgh (freshman)
- (United States) Devin Carter – G, Providence (junior)
- (United States) Stephon Castle – G, UConn (freshman)
- (United States) Cam Christie – G, Minnesota (freshman)
- (United States) Donovan Clingan – C, UConn (sophomore)
- (United States) Isaiah Collier – G, USC (freshman)
- (France) Mohamed Diarra – F, NC State (junior)
- (United States) Rob Dillingham – G, Kentucky (freshman)
- (United States) Ryan Dunn – F, Virginia (sophomore)
- (United States) Justin Edwards – G/F, Kentucky (freshman)
- (United States) Kyle Filipowski – F/C, Duke (sophomore)
- (Australia) Johnny Furphy – G/F, Kansas (freshman)
- (Switzerland) Kyshawn George – G/F, Miami (Florida) (freshman)
- (United States) DaRon Holmes II – F, Dayton (junior)
- (United States) Harrison Ingram – F, North Carolina (junior)
- (United States) Bronny James – G, USC (freshman)
- (United States) Jared McCain – G, Duke (freshman)
- (United States) Judah Mintz – G, Syracuse (sophomore)
- (Cameroon) Yves Missi – C, Baylor (freshman)
- (Belgium) Ajay Mitchell – G, UC Santa Barbara (junior)
- (United States) Carlos Nichols – G, Southern Crescent Tech (freshman)
- (United States) Reed Sheppard – G, Kentucky (freshman)
- (United States) KJ Simpson – G, Colorado (junior)
- (United States) Jaylon Tyson – G, California (junior)
- (United States) Ja'Kobe Walter – G, Baylor (freshman)
- (United States) Kel'el Ware – C, Indiana (sophomore)
- (United States) Deshawndre Washington – G/F, New Mexico State (junior)
- (United States) Jaylen Wells – F, Washington State (junior)
- (United States) Cody Williams – F, Colorado (freshman)
- (United States) JZ Zaher – G, Bowling Green (sophomore)

==== College seniors ====
"Redshirt" referred to players who were redshirt seniors in the 2023–24 season.

- (United States) Reece Beekman – G, Virginia
- (United States) Jesse Bingham II – G/F, Indianapolis (redshirt)
- (United States) Jack Brestel – F, Roanoke
- (United States) Jalen Bridges – F, Baylor (redshirt)
- (United States) Jalen Cook – G, LSU
- (United States) Isaiah Crawford – G/F, Louisiana Tech (redshirt)
- (Germany) Tristan da Silva – F, Colorado
- (Canada) Zach Edey – C, Purdue
- (United States) Eric Gaines – G, UAB
- (United States) PJ Hall – C, Clemson
- (United States) Oso Ighodaro – F, Marquette
- (Dominican Republic) David Jones – F, Memphis
- (United States) Dillon Jones – F, Weber State
- (United States) Tyler Kolek – G, Marquette
- (Sweden) Pelle Larsson – G, Arizona
- (United States) Jonathan Mogbo – F/C, San Francisco
- (United States) Tiras Morton – G/F, Lubbock Christian
- (United States) Jamal Shead – G, Houston
- (Australia) Jason Spurgin – C, Bowling Green
- (United States) Jaykwon Walton – G/F, Memphis (redshirt)

==== International players ====
- Melvin Ajinça – G/F, Saint-Quentin BB (France)
- (Cameroon) Ulrich Chomche – C, APR BBC (Rwanda)
- Cui Yongxi – G/F, Guangzhou Loong Lions (China)
- (France) Pacôme Dadiet – G/F, Ratiopharm Ulm (Germany)
- Lucas Dufeal – F, JA Vichy-Clermont (France)
- Nikola Đurišić – G/F, Mega MIS (Serbia)
- (United Kingdom) Quinn Ellis – G, Dolomiti Energia Trento (Italy)
- (Sweden) Bobi Klintman – F, Cairns Taipans (Australia)
- Gustav Knudsen – G/F, Bakken Bears (Denmark)
- (Spain) Juan Núñez – G, Ratiopharm Ulm (Germany)
- Zaccharie Risacher – F, JL Bourg (France)
- Tidjane Salaün – F, Cholet Basket (France)
- (France) Alex Sarr – F/C, Perth Wildcats (Australia)
- Nikola Topić – G, KK Crvena zvezda (Serbia)
- Armel Traoré – F, ADA Blois (France)
- Cezar Unitu – G, CSM Constanța (Romania)

==== Other ====
- (United States) / (Lithuania) Matas Buzelis – F, NBA G League Ignite (NBA G League)
- (United States) Trentyn Flowers – G/F, Adelaide 36ers (Australia)
- (United States) Ron Holland – F, NBA G League Ignite (NBA G League)
- (United States) AJ Johnson – G, Illawarra Hawks (Australia)
- (United States) Jalen Lewis – F/C, City Reapers (Overtime Elite)
- (Senegal) Babacar Sané – F, NBA G League Ignite (NBA G League)
- (United States) Tyler Smith – F, NBA G League Ignite (NBA G League)
- (United States) Bryson Warren – G, Sioux Falls Skyforce (NBA G League)

=== Automatically eligible entrants ===
Players who do not meet the criteria for "international" players are automatically eligible if they meet any of the following criteria:

- They have no remaining college eligibility.
- If they graduated from high school in the U.S., but did not enroll in a U.S. college or university, four years have passed since their high school class graduated.
- They have signed a contract with a professional basketball team not in the NBA, anywhere in the world, and have played under the contract.

Players who meet the criteria for "international" players are automatically eligible if they meet any of the following criteria:

- They are at least 22 years old during the calendar year of the draft. In term of dates players born on or before December 31, 2002, are automatically eligible for the 2024 draft.
- They have signed a contract with a professional basketball team not in the NBA within the United States, and have played under that contract.

== Invited attendees ==
The NBA annually invites players to sit in the so-called "green room", a special room set aside at the draft site for the invited players plus their families and agents. However, due to the new nature of the NBA draft taking place over the course of two days rather than one, the NBA sent invites in waves rather than all at once. The first wave was reported on June 11, with twelve players confirmed to be involved in the initial invitation process.

- (United States) / (Lithuania) Matas Buzelis, NBA G League Ignite (NBA G League)
- (United States) Devin Carter, Providence
- (United States) Stephon Castle, UConn
- (United States) Donovan Clingan, UConn
- (United States) Ron Holland, NBA G League Ignite (NBA G League)
- (United States) Dalton Knecht, Tennessee
- Zaccharie Risacher, JL Bourg (France)
- Tidjane Salaün, Cholet Basket (France)
- (France) Alex Sarr, Perth Wildcats (Australia)
- (United States) Reed Sheppard, Kentucky
- (United States) Ja'Kobe Walter, Baylor
- (United States) Cody Williams, Colorado

A second wave of invites was reported the following week on June 15, with eight additions to the list.

- (United States) Isaiah Collier, USC
- (United States) Rob Dillingham, Kentucky
- (United States) Kyle Filipowski, Duke
- (Australia) Johnny Furphy, Kansas
- (Switzerland) Kyshawn George, Miami (Florida)
- (United States) Jared McCain, Duke
- (Cameroon) Yves Missi, Baylor
- Nikola Topić, KK Crvena Zvezda (Serbia)

Finally, a minor third wave of invites was reported four days later on June 19.

- (United States) Bub Carrington, Pittsburgh
- (Germany) / (Brazil) Tristan da Silva, Colorado
- (United States) DaRon Holmes II, Dayton
- (United States) Kel'el Ware, Indiana

In addition to these, Canadian center Zach Edey from Purdue University was also given an invitation, but he declined to travel in order to watch the NBA draft at his alma mater with his family.
