= Justin Edwards (basketball, born 2003) =

American basketball player (born 2003)

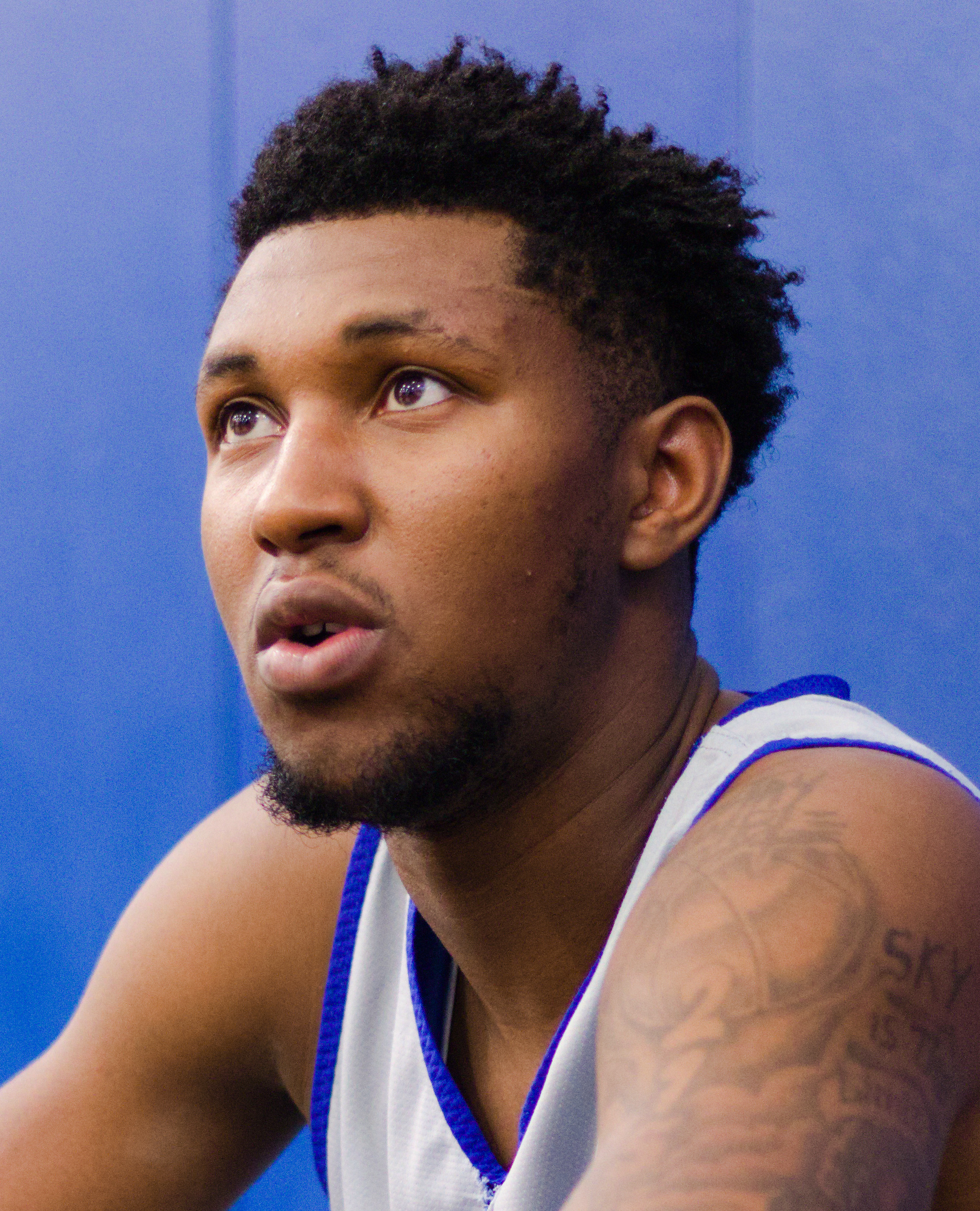
- Edwards in 2023

No. 11 – Philadelphia 76ers
- Position: Small forward
- League: NBA

Personal information
- Born: December 16, 2003 (age 22) Philadelphia, Pennsylvania, U.S.
- Listed height: 6 ft 7 in (2.01 m)
- Listed weight: 217 lb (98 kg)

Career information
- High school: Imhotep Institute Charter (Philadelphia, Pennsylvania)
- College: Kentucky (2023–2024)
- NBA draft: 2024: undrafted
- Playing career: 2024–present

Career history
- 2024–present: Philadelphia 76ers
- 2024: →Delaware Blue Coats

Career highlights
- McDonald's All-American (2023); Mr. Pennsylvania Basketball (2023)
- Stats at NBA.com
- Stats at Basketball Reference

Justin Tejon Edwards (born December 16, 2003) is an American professional basketball player for the Philadelphia 76ers of the National Basketball Association (NBA). He played college basketball for the Kentucky Wildcats. He was a consensus five-star recruit and one of the top players in the 2023 class.

== Early life and high school career ==
Edwards grew up in Philadelphia, Pennsylvania, and attended Imhotep Institute Charter High School. He helped Imhotep win the Philadelphia City championship as a sophomore. As a junior, Edwards averaged 18.3 points and 8.3 rebounds per game and led the Panthers to the PIAA Class 5A state championship. He played in the Nike Elite Youth Basketball League following the season. Edwards was selected to play in the 2023 McDonald's All-American Boys Game. He was also selected to play for Team USA in the Nike Hoops Summit. As a senior, Edwards averaged 17.9 points and 7.5 rebounds as the Panthers repeated as state champions. He was named Mr. Pennsylvania Basketball.

=== Recruiting ===
Edwards was a consensus five-star recruit and one of the top players in the 2023 class, according to major recruiting services. He was rated as the #1 overall recruit in the nation by ESPN in January 2023. On July 25, 2022, Edwards committed to playing college basketball for Kentucky after considering offers from Tennessee, Auburn, Kansas, Maryland and Villanova. He also considered playing professionally in the NBA G League.

College recruiting
Name	Hometown	School	Height	Weight	Commit date
Justin Edwards; SF	Philadelphia, PA	Imhotep Institute Charter (PA)	6 ft 7 in (2.01 m)	190 lb (86 kg)	Jul 25, 2022
Justin Edwards; SF	Recruit ratings: Rivals: 247Sports: ESPN: (94)				
Overall recruit ranking: Rivals: 3 247Sports: 3 ESPN: 3
Note: In many cases, Scout, Rivals, 247Sports, On3, and ESPN may conflict in their listings of height and weight.; In these cases, the average was taken. ESPN grades are on a 100-point scale.; Sources: "Kentucky 2023 Basketball Commitments". Rivals.; "2023 Kentucky Wildcats Recruiting Class". ESPN.; "2023 Team Ranking". Rivals.

== College career ==
Edwards enrolled at the University of Kentucky in June 2023. During the summer before his freshman year he played for the Wildcats in the GLOBL JAM tournament in Canada and averaged 14.5 points, 6.5 rebounds, 2.3 assists and 1.8 steals over four games as the team went undefeated and won the tournament. Edwards averaged 8.8 points and 3.4 rebounds in 32 games played during his freshman season. After the season, he declared for the 2024 NBA draft.

== Professional career ==
After going undrafted in the 2024 NBA draft, Edwards signed a two-way contract with his hometown team, the Philadelphia 76ers, on July 4, 2024. On January 14, 2025, Edwards scored a career-high 25 points on 9-of-16 shooting in a 118–102 loss to the Oklahoma City Thunder. On February 9, the 76ers signed him to a standard NBA contract. On March 21, Edwards tied a career-high 25 points in a 128–120 loss to the San Antonio Spurs. He made 44 appearances (26 starts) for Philadelphia during the 2024–25 NBA season, averaging 10.1 points, 3.4 rebounds, and 1.6 assists.

On June 27, 2025, Edwards re-signed with the 76ers on a three-year, $7.1 million contract.

== Career statistics ==
Legend
GP	Games played	GS	Games started	MPG	Minutes per game
FG%	Field goal percentage	3P%	3-point field goal percentage	FT%	Free throw percentage
RPG	Rebounds per game	APG	Assists per game	SPG	Steals per game
BPG	Blocks per game	PPG	Points per game	**Bold**	Career high

=== NBA ===
==== Regular season ====
Year	Team	GP	GS	MPG	FG%	3P%	FT%	RPG	APG	SPG	BPG	PPG
2024–25	Philadelphia	44	**26**	**26.3**	**.455**	.363	.696	**3.4**	**1.6**	**1.0**	**.4**	**10.1**
2025–26	Philadelphia	**64**	12	15.3	.447	**.372**	**.846**	1.5	1.3	.8	.2	6.0
Career		108	38	19.7	.451	.368	.765	2.2	1.4	.9	.3	7.7

==== Playoffs ====
Year	Team	GP	GS	MPG	FG%	3P%	FT%	RPG	APG	SPG	BPG	PPG
2026	Philadelphia	9	0	12.1	.344	.222	.571	2.2	.4	.0	.1	3.3
Career		9	0	12.1	.344	.222	.571	2.2	.4	.0	.1	3.3

=== College ===
Year	Team	GP	GS	MPG	FG%	3P%	FT%	RPG	APG	SPG	BPG	PPG
2023–24	Kentucky	32	30	21.4	.486	.365	.776	3.4	.9	.9	.2	8.8

== Personal life ==
Edwards's mother, Ebony Twiggs, played college basketball at Cheyney University of Pennsylvania and overseas in Portugal.
