= Lonnie Walker IV =

American basketball player (born 1998)

- Lonnie Walker IV

No. 4 – Beşiktaş Fuzul
- Position: Shooting guard
- League: BSL; EuroLeague

Personal information
- Born: December 14, 1998 (age 27) Reading, Pennsylvania, U.S.
- Listed height: 6 ft 4 in (1.93 m)
- Listed weight: 204 lb (93 kg)

Career information
- High school: Reading (Reading, Pennsylvania)
- College: Miami (Florida) (2017–2018)
- NBA draft: 2018: 1st round, 18th overall pick
- Drafted by: San Antonio Spurs
- Playing career: 2018–present

Career history
- 2018–2022: San Antonio Spurs
- 2018–2019: →Austin Spurs
- 2022–2023: Los Angeles Lakers
- 2023–2024: Brooklyn Nets
- 2024–2025: Žalgiris Kaunas
- 2025: Philadelphia 76ers
- 2025–2026: Maccabi Tel Aviv
- 2026–present: Beşiktaş

Career highlights
- Israeli Premier League champion (2026); King Mindaugas Cup winner (2025); ACC All-Freshman Team (2018); McDonald's All-American (2017); Mr. Pennsylvania Basketball (2017)
- Stats at NBA.com
- Stats at Basketball Reference

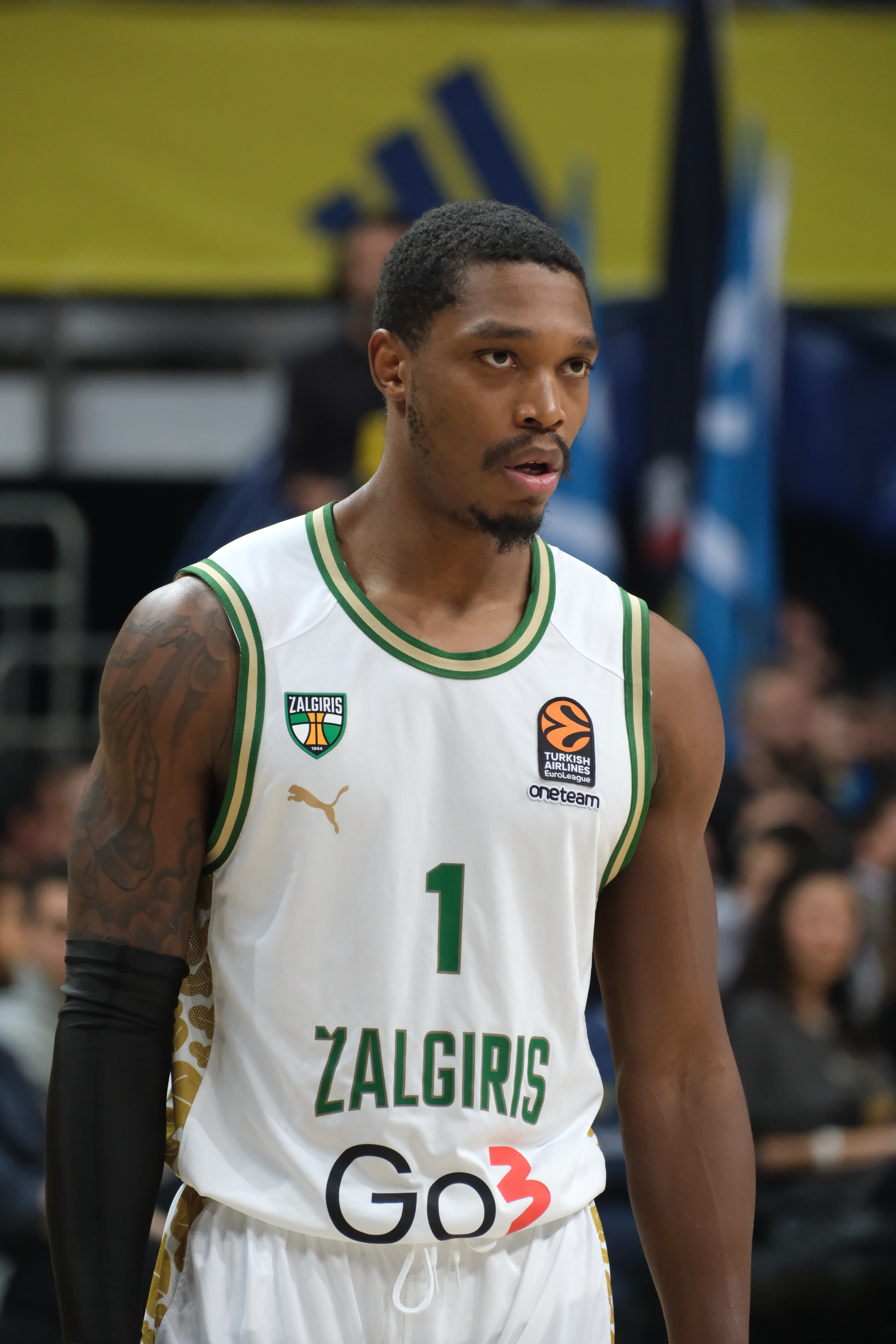
Walker with Žalgiris Kaunas in 2025

Lonnie Terrence Walker IV (born December 14, 1998) is an American professional basketball player for Beşiktaş of the Basketbol Süper Ligi (BSL) and the EuroLeague. In high school, he was named Mr. Pennsylvania Basketball and earned McDonald's All-American honors. Walker played college basketball for the Miami Hurricanes.

After being named to the all-freshman team in the Atlantic Coast Conference (ACC), he was selected in the first round of the 2018 NBA draft by the San Antonio Spurs with the 18th overall pick. He played four seasons with the Spurs before signing with the Los Angeles Lakers. He has also played for the Brooklyn Nets and the Philadelphia 76ers.

== Early life ==
Walker was born December 14, 1998, in Reading, Pennsylvania. He attended Reading Senior High School in Reading. Walker made his varsity basketball debut as a freshman and played 27 games averaging eight points per game, and later as a sophomore he averaged 16.9 points per game in a short season due to injury. In 29 games, as a junior, he averaged 17.1 points per game.

During his senior year, Walker was named a McDonald's All-American and voted Mr. Pennsylvania Basketball. He averaged a career best 18.4 points per game and surpassed Reading High grad and former NBA player Donyell Marshall's school record in points by finishing with 1,828 total points scored. On March 25, 2017, Walker led Reading Senior High School to their first state championship in the program's 117-year history in a 64–60 win over the Pine-Richland Rams. Walker finished the game with 22 points, eight rebounds, four steals, and three assists.

During the season, Walker signed with the Miami Hurricanes, passing on other scholarship offers from Villanova, Kentucky, Syracuse, and Arizona.

College recruiting
| Name | Hometown | School | Height | Weight | Commit date |
|---|---|---|---|---|---|
| Lonnie Walker; SG | Reading, PA | Reading HS (PA) | 6 ft 5 in (1.96 m) | 192 lb (87 kg) | Nov 16, 2016 |
| Lonnie Walker; SG | Recruit ratings: Scout: Rivals: 247Sports: ESPN: (93) | | | | |
Overall recruit ranking: Scout: #32 Rivals: #29 247Sports: #17 ESPN: #18
Note: In many cases, Scout, Rivals, 247Sports, On3, and ESPN may conflict in their listings of height and weight.; In these cases, the average was taken. ESPN grades are on a 100-point scale.; Sources: "Miami 2017 Basketball Commitments". Rivals.; "2017 Miami Basketball Commits". Scout.; "2017 Miami Hurricanes Recruiting Class". ESPN.; "Scout.com Team Recruiting Rankings". Scout.; "2017 Team Ranking". Rivals.; "2017 Miami 24/7 Sports Commits". 247Sports.

== College career ==
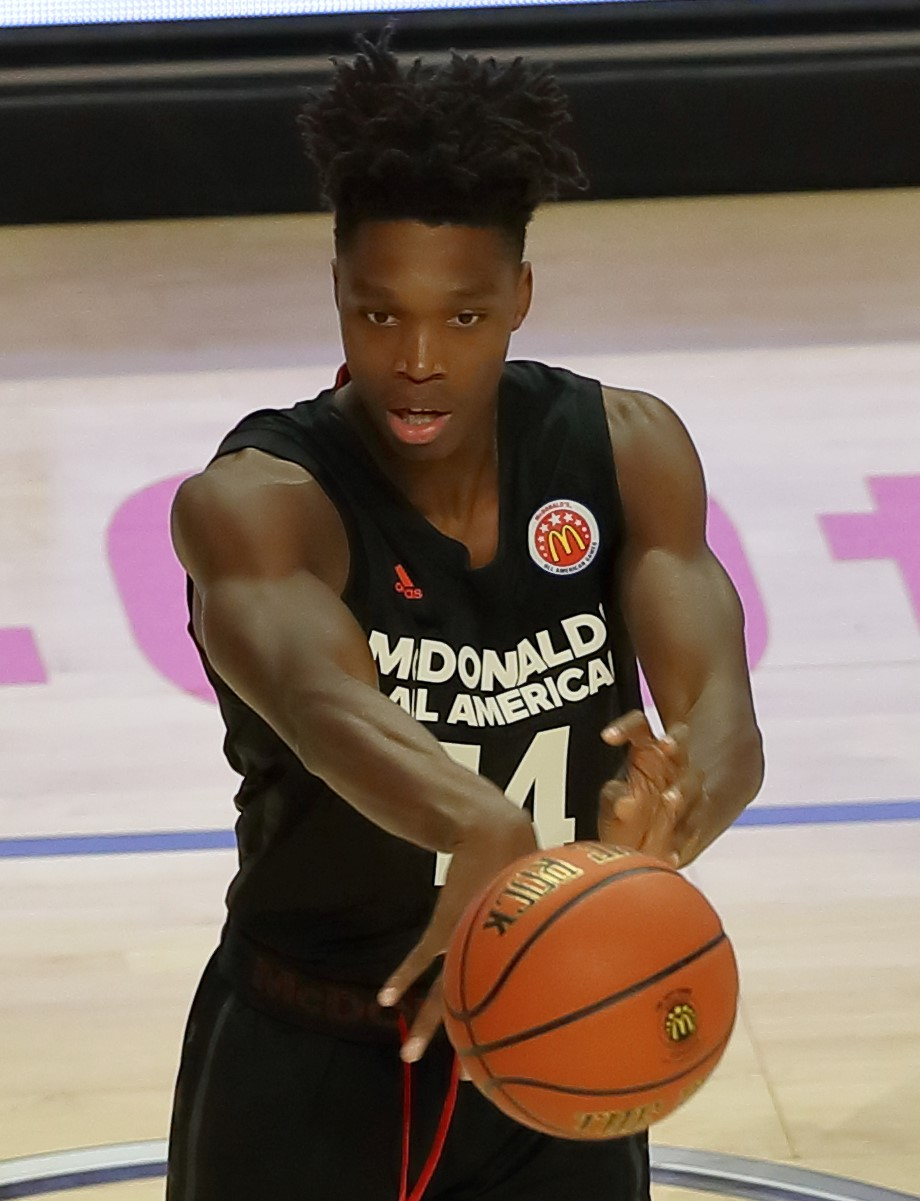
Walker in 2017

Walker made his collegiate debut with the Miami Hurricanes on November 10, 2017, recording 10 points and a season-high five assists coming off the bench in a 77–45 blowout win over Gardner-Webb University. He created new highs of 12 points and 5 rebounds on December 2 in an 80–52 blowout win against Princeton University before recording season-highs of 26 points and 7 rebounds during his first collegiate start three days later in a 69–54 win over Boston University. Against Louisville, he scored a game-high 25 points including an acrobatic layup in traffic to force overtime. In a game against Boston College, he hit a 3-pointer with two seconds remaining to win 79–78. Walker finished the season averaging 11.5 points per game and was named to the ACC all-freshman team.

After his sole season with Miami concluded, Walker declared for the 2018 NBA draft.

== Professional career ==
=== San Antonio Spurs (2018–2022) ===
On June 21, 2018, Walker was selected with the 18th overall pick by the San Antonio Spurs in the 2018 NBA draft. Walker was later included in the 2018 NBA Summer League roster of the Spurs. On July 11, 2018, the Spurs announced that they signed Walker. On October 6, 2018, Walker was revealed to have a right medial meniscus tear. On November 25, 2018, the San Antonio Spurs assigned Walker the first time of the season to the Austin Spurs. Walker made his NBA debut on January 3, 2019, in a 125–107 win against the Toronto Raptors, scoring three points and grabbing one rebound in five minutes of play.

On December 3, 2019, Walker scored a career-high 28 points, including 19 in the 4th quarter, in a 135–133 double overtime win over the Houston Rockets with four rebounds, three steals and a block.

=== Los Angeles Lakers (2022–2023) ===
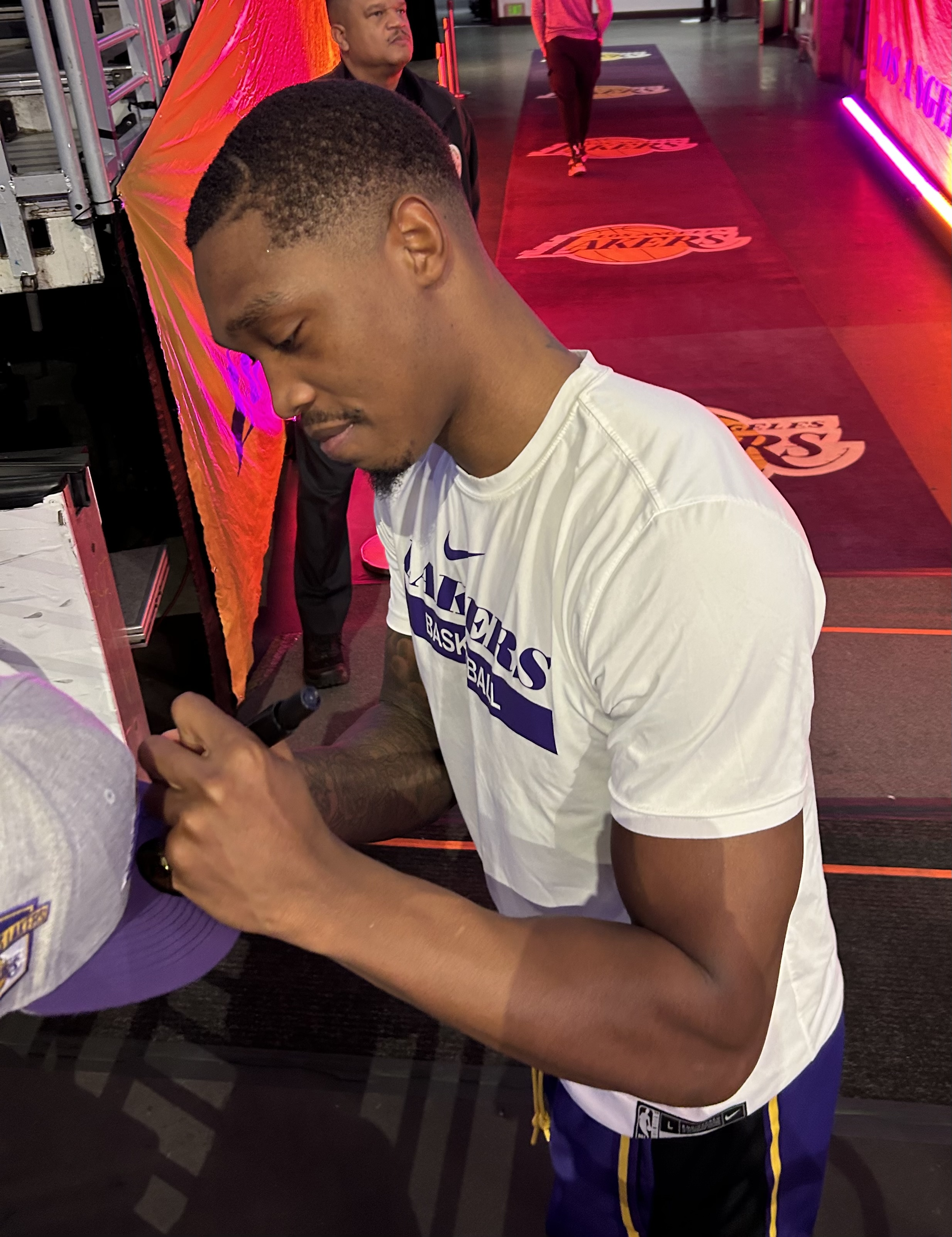
Walker signs an autograph while with the Los Angeles Lakers in 2023

On July 6, 2022, Walker signed with the Los Angeles Lakers on a one-year, $6.5M contract. He began the 2022–23 season playing in 32 games, all starts, before being sidelined beginning in late December with knee tendinitis. At the time, he was averaging 14.7 points in 29.8 minutes per game and shooting 45.5% from the field and 38.9% on 3-pointers. He seemed to be the Lakers top scorer after LeBron James, Anthony Davis, and Russell Westbrook. Walker returned after missing 14 games, but his playing time was limited with the development of Austin Reaves and particularly after the Lakers acquired D'Angelo Russell, Malik Beasley, Jarred Vanderbilt, and Rui Hachimura before the trade deadline. After playing in a bit shy of 28 minutes through the first eight games of the 2023 playoffs, Walker returned to the rotation and scored 12 points in 25 minutes in a 127–97 win over Golden State, giving the Lakers a 2–1 series lead in the conference semifinals. In Game 4, he scored all 15 of his points in the fourth quarter to help the Lakers overcome a seven-point deficit and win 104–101. In the 2022–23 season, in 56 games he averaged 23.2 minutes, 11.7 points, 1.9 rebounds, and 1.1 assists per game while shooting 86% from the free throw line.

=== Brooklyn Nets (2023–2024) ===
On July 10, 2023, Walker signed a reported one-year contract with the Brooklyn Nets. In the 2023–24 season, in 54 games he averaged 17.4 minutes, 9.7 points, 2.2 rebounds, and 1.3 assists per game while shooting 40% from three-point range and 83% from the free throw line. On June 29, 2024, Walker said after the season finale he was unsatisfied with the disrespect he received from the Brooklyn Nets' coaching staff and became a free agent after the season.

On August 28, Walker signed a reported one-year contract with the Boston Celtics, but was waived on October 19.

=== Žalgiris Kaunas (2024–2025) ===
On October 30, 2024, Walker signed with Žalgiris Kaunas of the Lithuanian Basketball League (LKL) and the EuroLeague. He helped Žalgiris win the King Mindaugas Cup, the top domestic cup competition, on February 16, 2025. In the 2024–2025 season, in 33 games he averaged 20.6 minutes, 13.5 points, 2.9 rebounds, and 2.0 assists per game while shooting 40% from three-point range and 83% from the free throw line.

On February 19, he parted ways with the team in order to return to the NBA.

=== Philadelphia 76ers (2025) ===
On February 21, 2025, Walker signed with his hometown team, the Philadelphia 76ers. He made 20 appearances (seven starts) for Philadelphia, recording averages of 12.4 points, 3.2 rebounds, and 2.5 assists while shooting 80% from the free throw line. After the 2025 NBA season, the 76ers declined to exercise their team option on Walker's contract, making him an unrestricted free agent.

=== Maccabi Tel Aviv (2025–2026) ===
On July 24, 2025, Walker signed a two-year contract with Maccabi Tel Aviv of the Israeli Basketball Premier League and the EuroLeague. The contract is worth approximately $5 million gross. The deal includes NBA exit clauses for 2025, and 2026. In the 2025–26 season, in 45 games he averaged 21.8 minutes, 15.2 points, 2.5 rebounds, and 2.2 assists per game while shooting 40% from three-point range and 83% from the free throw line.

On August 5, 2026, Walker signed a one-year, non-guaranteed contract with the Denver Nuggets, but was waived on October 12.

=== Beşiktaş (2026–present) ===
On October 15, 2026, Walker signed with Beşiktaş of the Turkish Basketbol Süper Ligi (BSL) and the EuroLeague.

== Career statistics ==
Legend
| GP | Games played | GS | Games started | MPG | Minutes per game |
| FG% | Field goal percentage | 3P% | 3-point field goal percentage | FT% | Free throw percentage |
| RPG | Rebounds per game | APG | Assists per game | SPG | Steals per game |
| BPG | Blocks per game | PPG | Points per game | **Bold** | Career high |

=== NBA ===
==== Regular season ====
| Year | Team | GP | GS | MPG | FG% | 3P% | FT% | RPG | APG | SPG | BPG | PPG |
|---|---|---|---|---|---|---|---|---|---|---|---|---|
| 2018–19 | San Antonio | 17 | 0 | 6.9 | .348 | .385 | .800 | 1.0 | .5 | .4 | .2 | 2.6 |
| 2019–20 | San Antonio | 61 | 12 | 16.2 | .426 | **.406** | .721 | 2.3 | 1.1 | .5 | .2 | 6.4 |
| 2020–21 | San Antonio | 60 | **38** | **25.4** | .420 | .355 | .814 | 2.6 | 1.7 | .5 | **.3** | 11.2 |
| 2021–22 | San Antonio | **70** | 6 | 23.0 | .407 | .314 | .784 | 2.6 | 2.2 | **.6** | **.3** | 12.1 |
| 2022–23 | L.A. Lakers | 56 | 32 | 23.2 | **.448** | .365 | **.858** | 1.9 | 1.1 | .5 | **.3** | 11.7 |
| 2023–24 | Brooklyn | 58 | 0 | 17.4 | .423 | .384 | .763 | 2.2 | 1.3 | **.6** | **.3** | 9.7 |
| 2024–25 | Philadelphia | 20 | 7 | 23.9 | .420 | .354 | .800 | **3.2** | **2.5** | .5 | **.3** | **12.4** |
| Career | | 342 | 95 | 20.5 | .422 | .356 | .795 | 2.3 | 1.5 | .5 | .3 | 10.0 |

==== Playoffs ====
| Year | Team | GP | GS | MPG | FG% | 3P% | FT% | RPG | APG | SPG | BPG | PPG |
|---|---|---|---|---|---|---|---|---|---|---|---|---|
| 2019 | San Antonio | 6 | **1** | 3.5 | .375 | .000 | — | .3 | .5 | .0 | .0 | 1.0 |
| 2023 | L.A. Lakers | **13** | 0 | **13.8** | **.483** | **.382** | **.750** | **.9** | **.8** | **.5** | **.1** | **6.2** |
| Career | | 19 | 1 | 10.5 | .471 | .371 | .750 | .7 | .7 | .4 | .1 | 4.5 |

=== EuroLeague ===
| Year | Team | GP | GS | MPG | FG% | 3P% | FT% | RPG | APG | SPG | BPG | PPG | PIR |
|---|---|---|---|---|---|---|---|---|---|---|---|---|---|
| 2024-25 | Žalgiris | 19 | 15 | 22.3 | .387 | .331 | **.857** | **3.2** | 1.8 | **.9** | **.2** | 13.6 | 11.3 |
| 2025-26 | Maccabi Tel Aviv | **28** | **26** | **22.7** | **.394** | **.351** | .758 | 2.5 | **2.2** | .8 | **.2** | **15.1** | 11.3 |
| Career | | 47 | 41 | 22.3 | .454 | .343 | .788 | 2.8 | 2.1 | .9 | .2 | 14.6 | 12.1 |

=== Domestic leagues ===
| Year | Team | League | GP | MPG | FG% | 3P% | FT% | RPG | APG | SPG | BPG | PPG |
|---|---|---|---|---|---|---|---|---|---|---|---|---|
| 2024-25 | (Lithuania) Žalgiris | LKL | 10 | 17.4 | .530 | .540 | .714 | 2.5 | 1.8 | 0.4 | .5 | 12.8 |
| 2025-26 | (Israel) Maccabi Tel Aviv | Ligat HaAl | 15 | 19.6 | .497 | .398 | .839 | 2.3 | 2.1 | 1.1 | .4 | 14.8 |

=== College ===
| Year | Team | GP | GS | MPG | FG% | 3P% | FT% | RPG | APG | SPG | BPG | PPG |
|---|---|---|---|---|---|---|---|---|---|---|---|---|
| 2017–18 | Miami | 32 | 18 | 27.8 | .415 | .346 | .738 | 2.6 | 1.9 | .9 | .5 | 11.5 |

== Personal life ==
Walker is the son of Lonnie Walker III who moved from New Jersey to Reading, Pennsylvania, to play basketball at Alvernia University. Walker III dropped out of university when Walker IV was born in 1998 and he had to raise his son as a single parent while working multiple jobs. Walker IV was encouraged to read after school by his father and maintains reading as part of his pregame ritual.

Walker has a dog named Zola (named after the evil robot with the same name), who appeared with him in a PETA ad campaign, reminding people not to leave their dogs in hot, parked cars.

In June 2020, Walker revealed he had been the victim of sexual abuse by family members as an adolescent, and had grown out his trademark long hairstyle as a coping mechanism. In deciding to cut his hair, Walker described the act as having "shed my skin mentally, emotionally, physically and spiritually."
