= Cam Reddish =

American basketball player (born 1999)

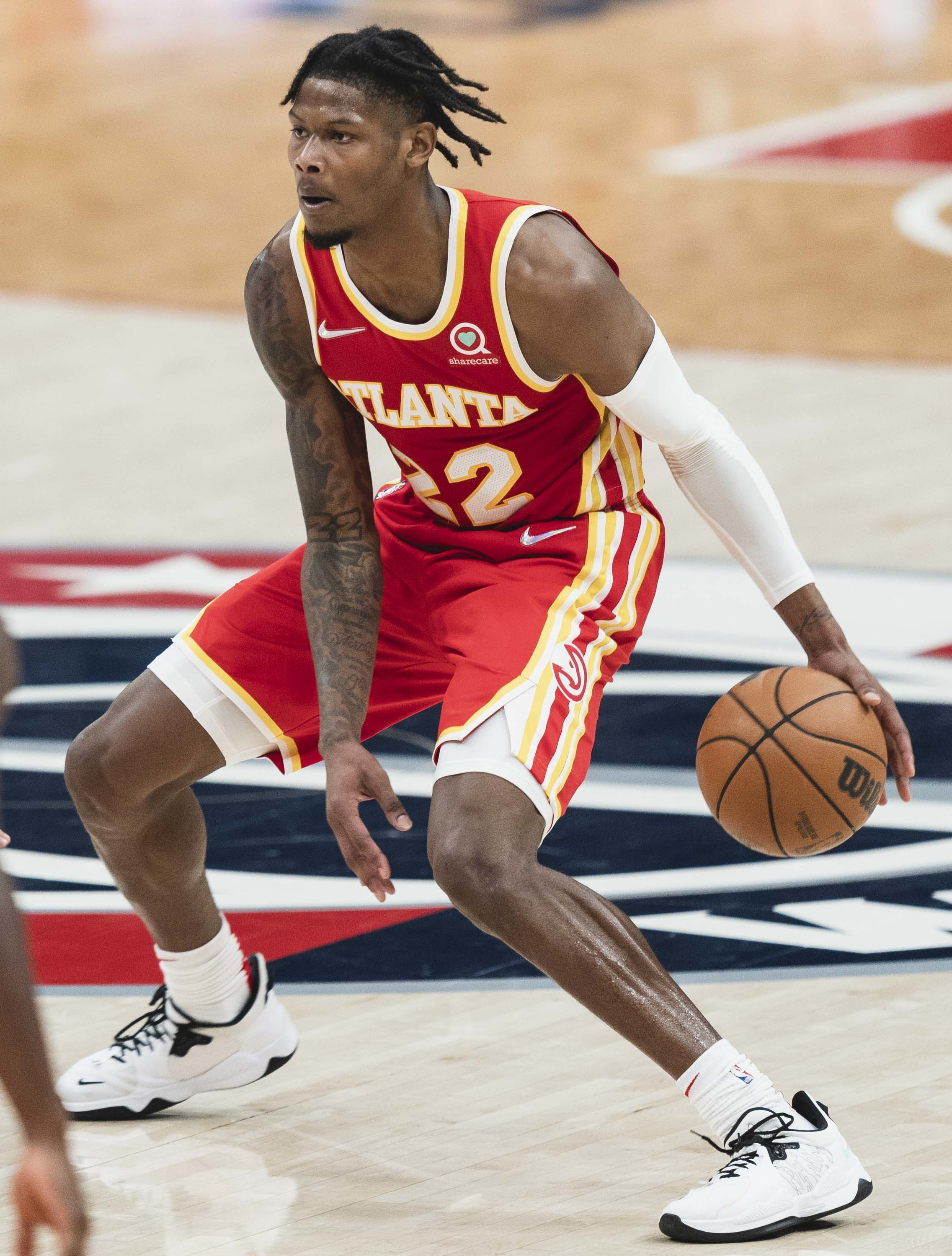
- Reddish with the Atlanta Hawks in 2021

Free agent
- Position: Small forward / shooting guard

Personal information
- Born: September 1, 1999 (age 27) Norristown, Pennsylvania, U.S.
- Listed height: 6 ft 7 in (2.01 m)
- Listed weight: 217 lb (98 kg)

Career information
- High school: Haverford School (Haverford, Pennsylvania); Westtown School (West Chester, Pennsylvania)
- College: Duke (2018–2019)
- NBA draft: 2019: 1st round, 10th overall pick
- Drafted by: Atlanta Hawks
- Playing career: 2019–present

Career history
- 2019–2022: Atlanta Hawks
- 2022–2023: New York Knicks
- 2023: Portland Trail Blazers
- 2023–2025: Los Angeles Lakers
- 2025: Šiauliai
- 2026: San Diego Clippers

Career highlights
- NBA Cup champion (2023); McDonald's All-American (2018); Mr. Pennsylvania Basketball (2018)
- Stats at NBA.com
- Stats at Basketball Reference
Medals
Men's basketball
Representing the United States
FIBA Under-19 World Cup
Bronze medal – third place	2017 Egypt

Cameron Elijah Reddish (born September 1, 1999) is an American professional basketball player who last played for the San Diego Clippers of the NBA G League. He played college basketball for the Duke Blue Devils. He was selected 10th overall by the Atlanta Hawks in the first round of the 2019 NBA draft.

Coming out of high school, Reddish was rated as a five-star recruit and considered one of the top players in his class, earning Mr. Pennsylvania Basketball in his senior year, in addition to being named to the 2018 McDonald's All-American Boys Game, 2018 Jordan Brand Classic and 2018 Nike Hoop Summit.

== High school career ==
Reddish attended the Haverford School in Haverford, Pennsylvania, as a freshman before transferring to Westtown School in West Chester, Pennsylvania, where he teamed up with Class of 2017 five-star recruit and current NBA player Mohamed Bamba. As a junior, Reddish averaged 16.2 points per game and led the Moose to a Friend's School League title. During the summer of 2017, Reddish averaged 23.8 points, 7.6 rebounds and 3.1 assists for his Amateur Athletic Union (AAU) team, Team Final, on the Nike EYBL Circuit. Later that summer, he played for the United States men's national under-19 basketball team. He was originally going to play for the under-17 team the previous summer, but did not make the team due to injury. In his senior year, he averaged 22.6 points and 5.6 rebounds per game. After his senior season, he was named 2018 Mr. Pennsylvania Basketball. Reddish was selected to play in the 2018 McDonald's All-American Game, Jordan Brand Classic, and Nike Hoop Summit All-Star games.

=== Recruiting ===
Reddish was a five-star recruit. He was ranked the third-best player in the 2018 class by 247Sports and the third-best recruit in the class of 2018 by ESPN. On September 1, 2017, Reddish committed to Duke University, joined by fellow top-3 recruits RJ Barrett and Zion Williamson.

College recruiting
Name	Hometown	School	Height	Weight	Commit date
Cam Reddish; SF	Norristown, PA	Westtown School (PA)	6 ft 7 in (2.01 m)	203 lb (92 kg)	Sep 1, 2017
Cam Reddish; SF	Recruit ratings: Rivals: 247Sports: ESPN: (96)				
Overall recruit ranking: Rivals: 3 247Sports: 3 ESPN: 3
Note: In many cases, Scout, Rivals, 247Sports, On3, and ESPN may conflict in their listings of height and weight.; In these cases, the average was taken. ESPN grades are on a 100-point scale.; Sources: "Duke 2018 Basketball Commitments". Rivals.; "2018 Duke Blue Devils Recruiting Class". ESPN.; "2018 Team Ranking". Rivals.

== College career ==
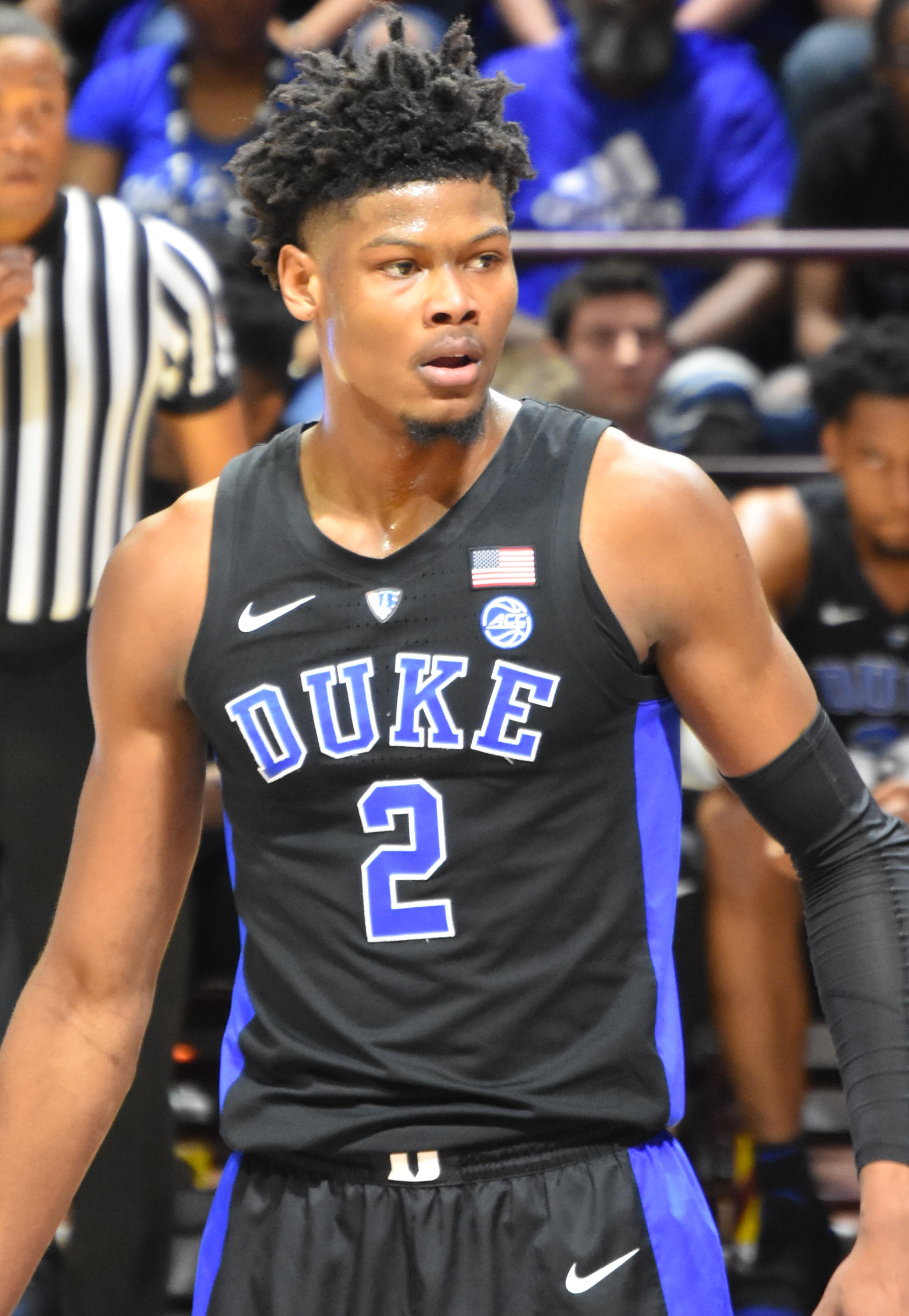
Reddish with the Duke Blue Devils in 2019

On November 6, 2018, In his Duke debut, Reddish scored 22 points in a 118–84 win over Kentucky at the 2018 Champions Classic. On November 11, 2018, Reddish scored 25 points and 7 rebounds in a 94–72 victory against Army. On November 19, 2018, Reddish scored 16 points and 2 rebounds in a 90–64 victory over San Diego State. On January 12, 2019, Reddish scored 23 points on 9-of-15 shooting, including the game winner, against Florida State. On February 5, 2019, Reddish tallied 24 points and 4 rebounds in an 80–55 win over Boston College. On February 12, he scored 22 points in a 71–69 comeback victory against Louisville. On March 2, Reddish scored 19 points and 7 rebounds in an 87–57 victory against Miami. Reddish appeared in 36 total games for Duke and averaged 13.5 points, 3.7 rebounds and 1.9 assists while shooting 33% from three-point range. Reddish was named to the All-ACC Honorable Mention team.

On April 11, 2019, Reddish declared himself eligible for the 2019 NBA draft.

== Professional career ==
=== Atlanta Hawks (2019–2022) ===
On June 20, 2019, Reddish was selected by the Atlanta Hawks with the 10th overall pick in the 2019 NBA draft. On July 1, 2019, Reddish officially signed with the Hawks. On October 24, 2019, Reddish made his NBA debut, started in a 117–100 win over the Detroit Pistons with twenty seven points, seven rebounds, four assists and three steals.

On December 22, 2021, Reddish scored a career-high 36 points in a 104–98 loss to the Orlando Magic.

=== New York Knicks (2022–2023) ===
On January 13, 2022, the Hawks traded Reddish, along with Solomon Hill, a 2025 second-round draft pick and cash considerations, to the New York Knicks in exchange for future teammate Kevin Knox II and a protected future first-round pick. Reddish made his Knicks debut on January 23, 2022, logging two points and two rebounds in five minutes. On March 10, 2022, the Knicks announced that Reddish would miss the rest of the season due to a right shoulder injury.

Coming into the 2022–23 season, Knicks head coach Tom Thibodeau was unsure of the role Reddish would play in his rotation. After earning a few starts in the beginning of November, Thibodeau announced on December 6, 2022, that Reddish had fallen out of his nine-man rotation.

=== Portland Trail Blazers (2023) ===
On February 9, 2023, Reddish was traded to the Portland Trail Blazers in a four-team trade involving the Charlotte Hornets and Philadelphia 76ers. He made his Trail Blazers debut the next day, recording 11 points, two rebounds and two assists in a 138–129 loss to the Oklahoma City Thunder.

=== Los Angeles Lakers (2023–2025) ===
On July 6, 2023, Reddish signed with the Los Angeles Lakers. On December 9, Reddish and the Lakers won the inaugural season of the NBA In-Season Tournament.

On February 6, 2025, Reddish and Dalton Knecht were traded to the Charlotte Hornets in exchange for Mark Williams. However, just two days later on February 8, it was reported that the trade had been rescinded after Williams did not pass a physical. He made 33 appearances (8 starts) for Los Angeles during the 2024–25 NBA season, averaging 3.2 points, 2.0 rebounds, and 0.7 assists. On March 27, the Lakers announced that they had waived Reddish.

=== Šiauliai (2025) ===
On September 10, 2025, Reddish signed with Šiauliai of the Lithuanian Basketball League (LKL). On December 6, Reddish left Šiauliai by a mutual agreement, and returned to the U.S. for personal reasons.

=== Los Angeles Clippers (2026) ===
On January 21, 2026, Reddish was assigned to the Austin Spurs of the NBA G League; he was subsequently traded to the Los Angeles Clippers in exchange for the team's first-round pick in the 2027 NBA G League draft.

== Career statistics ==
Legend
GP	Games played	GS	Games started	MPG	Minutes per game
FG%	Field goal percentage	3P%	3-point field goal percentage	FT%	Free throw percentage
RPG	Rebounds per game	APG	Assists per game	SPG	Steals per game
BPG	Blocks per game	PPG	Points per game	**Bold**	Career high

=== NBA ===
==== Regular season ====
Year	Team	GP	GS	MPG	FG%	3P%	FT%	RPG	APG	SPG	BPG	PPG
2019–20	Atlanta	**58**	**34**	26.7	.384	.332	.802	3.7	1.5	1.1	**.5**	10.5
2020–21	Atlanta	26	21	**28.9**	.365	.262	.817	**4.0**	1.3	**1.3**	.3	11.2
2021–22	Atlanta	34	7	23.4	.402	**.379**	.900	2.5	1.1	1.0	.3	**11.9**
2021–22	New York	15	0	14.4	.415	.258	**.906**	1.4	.7	.8	.3	6.1
2022–23	New York	20	8	21.9	**.449**	.304	.879	1.6	1.0	.8	.4	8.4
2022–23	Portland	20	12	27.6	.443	.318	.833	2.9	**1.9**	1.2	.3	11.0
2023–24	L.A. Lakers	48	26	20.5	.389	.336	.759	2.1	1.0	1.0	.3	5.4
2024–25	L.A. Lakers	33	8	17.9	.404	.277	.615	2.0	.7	1.0	.3	3.2
Career		254	116	23.1	.398	.322	.821	2.7	1.2	1.0	.4	8.5

==== Playoffs ====
Year	Team	GP	GS	MPG	FG%	3P%	FT%	RPG	APG	SPG	BPG	PPG
2021	Atlanta	4	0	23.0	.528	.643	.800	3.5	1.8	1.5	.5	12.8
Career		4	0	23.0	.528	.643	.800	3.5	1.8	1.5	.5	12.8

=== College ===
Year	Team	GP	GS	MPG	FG%	3P%	FT%	RPG	APG	SPG	BPG	PPG
2018–19	Duke	36	35	29.7	.356	.333	.772	3.7	1.9	1.6	.6	13.5

== Personal life ==
Reddish was born in Norristown, Pennsylvania to Zanthia and Robert Reddish. His father Robert played college basketball at VCU. Reddish has a younger brother, Aaron, who played high school basketball for the Pebblebrook Falcons in Mableton, Georgia and is currently a senior for the Albany Great Danes.
