= Imhotep Institute Charter High School =

Public charter school in the United States

Location
- 6201 N 21st St, Philadelphia, PA 19138; Philadelphia, Pennsylvania; United States; 40.0490°N 75.1556°W

Information
- Type: Private Charter
- Established: 1998
- Teaching staff: 29.00 (FTE)
- Grades: 9-12
- Enrollment: 597 (2022–2023)
- Student to teacher ratio: 20.59
- Colors: Red, White and Black
- Website: www.imhotephighschool.com

Imhotep Institute Charter High School is a charter high school located in Philadelphia, Pennsylvania. It was founded in 1998 to offer an African-centered education that emphasizes STEM subjects.

During the 2015–16 school year, the school reported an enrollment of 651 students, the most in the school's history.

== Notable alumni ==
- Gerald Bowman (2008), football player who played for the Baltimore Ravens
- Erik Copes (2011), basketball player who played professionally in Europe
- David Williams (2013), football player who played for the Jacksonville Jaguars
- Charlie Brown Jr. (2015 - transferred), basketball player who played for 5 NBA teams
- Dougie on the Beat (2015), record producer
- D. J. Moore (2015), football player who plays for the Buffalo Bills
- Yasir Durant (2016), football player who played for three NFL teams
- Andre Mintze (2016), football player who played for the Denver Broncos
- Shaka Toney (2016), football player who played for the Washington Commanders
- Fatts Russell (2017), basketball player who plays professionally in Turkey
- Donta Scott (2019), basketball player who plays for the Santa Cruz Warriors
- Tykee Smith (2019), football player who plays for the Tampa Bay Buccaneers
- Justin Edwards (2023), basketball player who plays for the Philadelphia 76ers
