= 2026–27 Philadelphia 76ers season =

- Head coach: Nick Nurse
- President: Mike Gansey
- General manager: Jameer Nelson
- Owner: Josh Harris
- Arena: Xfinity Mobile Arena

Results
- Record: 14–3 (.824)
- Place: Division: 1st (Atlantic); Conference: 1st (Eastern)
- Stats at Basketball Reference

Local media
- Television: NBCSPHI, NBCSPHI+, 6ABC
- Radio: WPEN

The 2026–27 Philadelphia 76ers season is the 78th season of the franchise in the National Basketball Association (NBA). On May 12, 2026, president of basketball operations Daryl Morey was fired and Bob Myers was named as the interim. On May 29, Mike Gansey was named as president of basketball operations, and on June 7, Jameer Nelson was promoted to executive vice president of basketball operations. During the offseason, the 76ers acquired Jaylen Brown in a trade with the Boston Celtics and signed free agent LeBron James to a 2-year, $8 million contract for his league-record 24th season.

== Draft picks ==
| Round | Pick | Player | Position | Nationality | College |
|---|---|---|---|---|---|
| 1 | 22 | Labaron Philon Jr. | PG | United States | Alabama |

The 76ers entered the draft holding one first-round selection, which originally belonged to the Houston Rockets. The pick was conveyed to the team through a February 2026 trade with the Oklahoma City Thunder in exchange for Jared McCain, becoming the second-most favorable pick after Houston finished the 2025–26 season between Oklahoma City and the Los Angeles Clippers in the regular season standings.

They had traded their original first- and second-round picks to Oklahoma City as a part of the Al Horford-for-Danny Green trade in 2020 and the George Hill three-team trade in 2021, respectively. The first-round pick was conveyed to Oklahoma City after landing outside the Top 4 when the 76ers qualified for the 2026 NBA playoffs, having previously deferred from 2025 when it fell within the top six in the lottery and was used to select V. J. Edgecombe 3rd overall. On the other hand, their original second-round selection was rerouted to the Phoenix Suns through subsequent trades as the second most favorable pick after Philadelphia finished the previous season between Oklahoma City and the Dallas Mavericks.

== Roster ==
Philadelphia 76ers roster
Players

| Pos. | No. | Player | Height | Weight | DOB | From |
|---|---|---|---|---|---|---|
| F | 25 | Dominick Barlow (injured) | 6 ft 9 in (2.06 m) | 224 lb (102 kg) | 2003-05-26 | Saint Joseph's |
| F/C | 30 | Adem Bona | 6 ft 10 in (2.08 m) | 235 lb (107 kg) | 2003-03-28 | UCLA |
| G/F | 7 | Jaylen Brown | 6 ft 6 in (1.98 m) | 223 lb (101 kg) | 1996-10-24 | California |
| G | 1 | Kentavious Caldwell-Pope | 6 ft 5 in (1.96 m) | 204 lb (93 kg) | 1993-02-18 | Georgia |
| G | 77 | V. J. Edgecombe | 6 ft 5 in (1.96 m) | 190 lb (86 kg) | 2005-07-30 | Baylor |
| F | 11 | Justin Edwards | 6 ft 7 in (2.01 m) | 217 lb (98 kg) | 2003-12-16 | Kentucky |
| C | 21 | Joel Embiid | 7 ft 0 in (2.13 m) | 270 lb (122 kg) | 1994-03-16 | Kansas |
| C | 99 | Tacko Fall (TW) | 7 ft 6 in (2.29 m) | 311 lb (141 kg) | 1995-12-10 | Central Florida |
| C | 55 | Ariel Hukporti (injured) | 7 ft 0 in (2.13 m) | 246 lb (112 kg) | 2002-04-12 | Germany |
| F | 23 | LeBron James | 6 ft 9 in (2.06 m) | 250 lb (113 kg) | 1984-12-30 | St. Vincent–St. Mary HS (OH) |
| G | 8 | Caleb Love (TW) | 6 ft 3 in (1.91 m) | 212 lb (96 kg) | 2001-09-27 | Arizona |
| G | 0 | Tyrese Maxey | 6 ft 2 in (1.88 m) | 200 lb (91 kg) | 2000-10-04 | Kentucky |
| G | 00 | Labaron Philon Jr. | 6 ft 3 in (1.91 m) | 177 lb (80 kg) | 2005-11-24 | Alabama |
| G/F | 12 | Rayan Rupert (TW) | 6 ft 7 in (2.01 m) | 205 lb (93 kg) | 2004-05-21 | France |
| G | 5 | Anfernee Simons | 6 ft 4 in (1.93 m) | 200 lb (91 kg) | 1999-06-08 | IMG Academy (FL) |
| F/C | 45 | Dean Wade | 6 ft 9 in (2.06 m) | 228 lb (103 kg) | 1996-11-20 | Kansas State |
| F | 33 | Jabari Walker | 6 ft 7 in (2.01 m) | 237 lb (108 kg) | 2002-07-30 | Colorado |

Coaches
Head coach
- Nick Nurse
Assistant(s)
- Matt Brase
- Fabulous Flournoy
- Bryan Gates
- Phil Handy
- Rico Hines
- Coby Karl
- Mike Longabardi
- Doug West
- Dice Yoshimoto

Legend
- (DP) Unsigned draft pick
- (FA) Free agent
- (S) Suspended
- (GL) On assignment to G League affiliate
- (TW) Two-way affiliate player
- Injured

Roster
Updated: August 22, 2026

== Standings ==
=== Division ===
| Atlantic Division | W | L | PCT | GB | Home | Road | Div | GP |
|---|---|---|---|---|---|---|---|---|
| Philadelphia 76ers | 13 | 3 | .813 | – | 6‍–‍2 | 7‍–‍1 | 4–1 | 16 |
| Boston Celtics | 11 | 4 | .733 | 1.5 | 6‍–‍1 | 5‍–‍3 | 4–0 | 15 |
| New York Knicks | 9 | 6 | .600 | 3.5 | 4‍–‍3 | 5‍–‍3 | 3–3 | 15 |
| Toronto Raptors | 6 | 10 | .375 | 7.0 | 2‍–‍6 | 4‍–‍4 | 0–4 | 16 |
| Brooklyn Nets | 3 | 12 | .200 | 9.5 | 1‍–‍6 | 2‍–‍6 | 0–3 | 15 |

=== Conference ===
Eastern Conference
| # | Team | W | L | PCT | GB | GP |
|---|---|---|---|---|---|---|
| 1 | Philadelphia 76ers * | 13 | 3 | .813 | – | 16 |
| 2 | Boston Celtics | 11 | 4 | .733 | 1.5 | 15 |
| 3 | Detroit Pistons * | 10 | 5 | .667 | 2.5 | 15 |
| 4 | Atlanta Hawks * | 10 | 6 | .625 | 3.0 | 16 |
| 5 | Miami Heat | 9 | 6 | .600 | 3.5 | 15 |
| 6 | New York Knicks | 9 | 6 | .600 | 3.5 | 15 |
| 7 | Cleveland Cavaliers | 9 | 8 | .529 | 4.5 | 17 |
| 8 | Orlando Magic | 7 | 8 | .467 | 5.5 | 15 |
| 9 | Toronto Raptors | 6 | 10 | .375 | 7.0 | 16 |
| 10 | Washington Wizards | 6 | 11 | .353 | 7.5 | 17 |
| 11 | Indiana Pacers | 5 | 11 | .313 | 8.0 | 16 |
| 12 | Charlotte Hornets | 4 | 11 | .267 | 8.5 | 15 |
| 13 | Chicago Bulls | 4 | 11 | .267 | 8.5 | 15 |
| 14 | Brooklyn Nets | 3 | 12 | .200 | 9.5 | 15 |
| 15 | Milwaukee Bucks | 1 | 15 | .063 | 12.0 | 16 |

== Game log ==
=== Preseason ===
2026 preseason game log
Total: 1–3 (Home: 1–1; Road: 0–2)
Preseason: 1–3 (home: 1–1; road: 0–2)

| Game | Date | Team | Score | High points | High rebounds | High assists | Location Attendance | Record |
|---|---|---|---|---|---|---|---|---|
| 1 | October 5 | New York | W 120–97 | Jaylen Brown (22) | Jabari Walker (11) | V. J. Edgecombe (7) | Xfinity Mobile Arena; 19,746 | 1–0 |
| 2 | October 8 | @ Brooklyn | L 108–114 | Jaylen Brown (18) | Jabari Walker (7) | James, Love (5) | Barclays Center; 16,785 | 1–1 |
| 3 | October 10 | @ Boston | L 106–144 | V. J. Edgecombe (19) | Jabari Walker (6) | Labaron Philon Jr. (7) | TD Garden; 19,156 | 1–2 |
| 4 | October 16 | Boston | L 120–125 (OT) | Joel Embiid (27) | Brown, Embiid, James (8) | LeBron James (7) | Xfinity Mobile Arena; 19,746 | 1–3 |

2026–27 preseason schedule

=== Regular season ===
2026–27 game log
Total: 14–3 (Home: 7–2; Road: 7–1)
October: 6–1 (home: 3–1; road: 3–0)

| Game | Date | Team | Score | High points | High rebounds | High assists | Location Attendance | Record |
|---|---|---|---|---|---|---|---|---|
| 1 | October 20 | @ New York | W 106–100 | Tyrese Maxey (28) | Joel Embiid (11) | LeBron James (7) | Madison Square Garden; 19,812 | 1–0 |
| 2 | October 22 | Cleveland | W 114–106 | Tyrese Maxey (32) | LeBron James (10) | Edgecombe, Maxey (6) | Xfinity Mobile Arena; 21,423 | 2–0 |
| 3 | October 24 | Milwaukee | W 127–116 | Joel Embiid (28) | V. J. Edgecombe (13) | Joel Embiid (10) | Xfinity Mobile Arena; 21,003 | 3–0 |
| 4 | October 25 | Detroit | L 93–106 | Tyrese Maxey (29) | Adem Bona (13) | LeBron James (5) | Xfinity Mobile Arena; 21,117 | 3–1 |
| 5 | October 28 | @ Indiana | W 114–109 | Tyrese Maxey (27) | Joel Embiid (11) | LeBron James (10) | Gainbridge Fieldhouse; 17,274 | 4–1 |
| 6 | October 30 | New York | W 98–93 | Tyrese Maxey (27) | LeBron James (9) | LeBron James (8) | Xfinity Mobile Arena; 21,196 | 5–1 |
| 7 | October 31 | @ Charlotte | W 109–104 | Tyrese Maxey (38) | V. J. Edgecombe (7) | Dean Wade (10) | Spectrum Center; 19,533 | 6–1 |

November: 8–2 (home: 4–1; road: 4–1)

| Game | Date | Team | Score | High points | High rebounds | High assists | Location Attendance | Record |
|---|---|---|---|---|---|---|---|---|
| 8 | November 2 | Chicago | W 126–107 | Tyrese Maxey (26) | Jaylen Brown (11) | Tyrese Maxey (11) | Xfinity Mobile Arena; 21,309 | 7–1 |
| 9 | November 4 | @ Detroit | W 112–106 | Jaylen Brown (30) | Joel Embiid (15) | LeBron James (8) | Little Caesars Arena; 20,198 | 8–1 |
| 10 | November 6 | @ Cleveland | L 95–119 | Jaylen Brown (20) | Embiid, James (7) | Jaylen Brown (5) | Rocket Arena; 19,432 | 8–2 |
| 11 | November 8 | @ Chicago | W 127–121 | Jaylen Brown (29) | Jabari Walker (11) | Tyrese Maxey (7) | United Center; 21,060 | 9–2 |
| 12 | November 10 | Boston | L 101–123 | Tyrese Maxey (24) | Dean Wade (9) | Edgecombe, James (5) | Xfinity Mobile Arena; 21,497 | 9–3 |
| 13 | November 12 | Toronto | W 123–112 | Tyrese Maxey (27) | Edgecombe, Walker (8) | Edgecombe, Maxey (8) | Xfinity Mobile Arena; 20,986 | 10–3 |
| 14 | November 15 | Indiana | W 131–124 | Jaylen Brown (31) | James, Wade, Walker (7) | LeBron James (11) | Xfinity Mobile Arena; 21,024 | 11–3 |
| 15 | November 16 | @ Brooklyn | W 135–123 | Joel Embiid (37) | Jaylen Brown (13) | Tyrese Maxey (9) | Barclays Center; 17,548 | 12–3 |
| 16 | November 18 | @ Orlando | W 121–116 | Joel Embiid (26) | Caldwell-Pope, Edgecombe (8) | Joel Embiid (7) | Kia Center; 19,365 | 13–3 |
| 17 | November 21 | Milwaukee | W 132–129 | Joel Embiid (26) | Joel Embiid (17) | Joel Embiid (9) | Xfinity Mobile Arena; 21,043 | 14–3 |
| 18 | November 23 | Portland | | | | | Xfinity Mobile Arena | – |
| 19 | November 25 | Miami | | | | | Xfinity Mobile Arena | – |
| 20 | November 27 | @ Indiana | | | | | Gainbridge Fieldhouse | – |
| 21 | November 28 | @ Houston | | | | | Toyota Center | – |

December: 0–0 (home: 0–0; road: 0–0)

| Game | Date | Team | Score | High points | High rebounds | High assists | Location Attendance | Record |
|---|---|---|---|---|---|---|---|---|
| 22 | December 1 | Memphis | | | | | Xfinity Mobile Arena | – |
| 23 | December 2 | Denver | | | | | Xfinity Mobile Arena | – |
| 24 | TBD | TBD | | | | | TBD | – |
| 25 | TBD | TBD | | | | | TBD | – |
| 26 | December 12 | Orlando | | | | | Xfinity Mobile Arena | – |
| 27 | December 14 | @ Orlando | | | | | Kia Center | – |
| 28 | December 17 | Dallas | | | | | Xfinity Mobile Arena | – |
| 29 | December 21 | @ Charlotte | | | | | Spectrum Center | – |
| 30 | December 23 | Houston | | | | | Xfinity Mobile Arena | – |
| 31 | December 25 | @ L.A. Lakers | | | | | Crypto.com Arena | – |
| 32 | December 27 | @ L.A. Clippers | | | | | Intuit Dome | – |
| 33 | December 29 | @ Sacramento | | | | | Golden 1 Center | – |
| 34 | December 30 | @ Phoenix | | | | | Mortgage Matchup Center | – |

January: 0–0 (home: 0–0; road: 0–0)

| Game | Date | Team | Score | High points | High rebounds | High assists | Location Attendance | Record |
|---|---|---|---|---|---|---|---|---|
| 35 | January 1 | @ Milwaukee | | | | | Fiserv Forum | – |
| 36 | January 4 | Atlanta | | | | | Xfinity Mobile Arena | – |
| 37 | January 6 | Oklahoma City | | | | | Xfinity Mobile Arena | – |
| 38 | January 8 | Miami | | | | | Xfinity Mobile Arena | – |
| 39 | January 10 | @ Toronto | | | | | Scotiabank Arena | – |
| 40 | January 12 | Washington | | | | | Xfinity Mobile Arena | – |
| 41 | January 14 | Brooklyn | | | | | Xfinity Mobile Arena | – |
| 42 | January 16 | Minnesota | | | | | Xfinity Mobile Arena | – |
| 43 | January 18 | @ Atlanta | | | | | State Farm Arena | – |
| 44 | January 19 | Indiana | | | | | Xfinity Mobile Arena | – |
| 45 | January 21 | @ Boston | | | | | TD Garden | – |
| 46 | January 23 | @ Chicago | | | | | United Center | – |
| 47 | January 25 | L.A. Clippers | | | | | Xfinity Mobile Arena | – |
| 48 | January 27 | Sacramento | | | | | Xfinity Mobile Arena | – |
| 49 | January 28 | @ New Orleans | | | | | Smoothie King Center | – |
| 50 | January 30 | @ Miami | | | | | Kaseya Center | – |

February: 0–0 (home: 0–0; road: 0–0)

| Game | Date | Team | Score | High points | High rebounds | High assists | Location Attendance | Record |
|---|---|---|---|---|---|---|---|---|
| 51 | February 1 | New Orleans | | | | | Xfinity Mobile Arena | – |
| 52 | February 3 | @ Memphis | | | | | FedExForum | – |
| 53 | February 5 | Detroit | | | | | Xfinity Mobile Arena | – |
| 54 | February 7 | Boston | | | | | Xfinity Mobile Arena | – |
| 55 | February 8 | Brooklyn | | | | | Xfinity Mobile Arena | – |
| 56 | February 11 | New York | | | | | Xfinity Mobile Arena | – |
| 57 | February 13 | @ Oklahoma City | | | | | Paycom Center | – |
| 58 | February 15 | @ Dallas | | | | | American Airlines Center | – |
| 59 | February 17 | Phoenix | | | | | Xfinity Mobile Arena | – |
All-Star Game
| 60 | February 25 | @ Brooklyn | | | | | Barclays Center | – |
| 61 | February 27 | @ New York | | | | | Madison Square Garden | – |

March: 0–0 (home: 0–0; road: 0–0)

| Game | Date | Team | Score | High points | High rebounds | High assists | Location Attendance | Record |
|---|---|---|---|---|---|---|---|---|
| 62 | March 1 | @ Cleveland | | | | | Rocket Arena | – |
| 63 | March 3 | Charlotte | | | | | Xfinity Mobile Arena | – |
| 64 | March 4 | L.A. Lakers | | | | | Xfinity Mobile Arena | – |
| 65 | March 7 | @ Boston | | | | | TD Garden | – |
| 66 | March 8 | Utah | | | | | Xfinity Mobile Arena | – |
| 67 | March 11 | @ San Antonio | | | | | Frost Bank Center | – |
| 68 | March 13 | @ Minnesota | | | | | Target Center | – |
| 69 | March 15 | Toronto | | | | | Xfinity Mobile Arena | – |
| 70 | March 17 | Chicago | | | | | Xfinity Mobile Arena | – |
| 71 | March 18 | @ Washington | | | | | Capital One Arena | – |
| 72 | March 21 | San Antonio | | | | | Xfinity Mobile Arena | – |
| 73 | March 23 | @ Utah | | | | | Delta Center | – |
| 74 | March 24 | @ Golden State | | | | | Chase Center | – |
| 75 | March 26 | @ Portland | | | | | Moda Center | – |
| 76 | March 28 | @ Denver | | | | | Ball Arena | – |
| 77 | March 31 | Golden State | | | | | Xfinity Mobile Arena | – |

April: 0–0 (home: 0–0; road: 0–0)

| Game | Date | Team | Score | High points | High rebounds | High assists | Location Attendance | Record |
|---|---|---|---|---|---|---|---|---|
| 78 | April 2 | @ Washington | | | | | Capital One Arena | – |
| 79 | April 4 | Atlanta | | | | | Xfinity Mobile Arena | – |
| 80 | April 6 | @ Toronto | | | | | Scotiabank Arena | – |
| 81 | April 8 | @ Miami | | | | | Kaseya Center | – |
| 82 | April 11 | Charlotte | | | | | Xfinity Mobile Arena | – |

2026–27 season schedule

== NBA Cup ==
=== East Group B ===
| Pos | Team | Pld | W | L | PF | PA | PD | Qualification |
|---|---|---|---|---|---|---|---|---|
| 1 | Miami Heat | 2 | 2 | 0 | 278 | 246 | +32 | Advance to knockout stage |
| 2 | Cleveland Cavaliers | 3 | 2 | 1 | 368 | 347 | +21 | Possible knockout stage based on ranking |
| 3 | Philadelphia 76ers | 2 | 1 | 1 | 193 | 212 | −19 | |
| 4 | Indiana Pacers | 3 | 1 | 2 | 350 | 377 | −27 | |
| 5 | New York Knicks | 2 | 0 | 2 | 197 | 204 | −7 | |

Updated to game(s) played on November 20, 2026. Source:

== Transactions ==
=== Trades ===
| Date | Trade | | Ref. |
|---|---|---|---|
| July 6, 2026 | To Philadelphia 76ers: Jaylen Brown | To Boston Celtics: Paul George; 2028 LAC first-round pick; 2031 PHI first-round pick; 2028 second-round pick; 2030 second-round pick | |
| July 28, 2026 | To Philadelphia 76ers: Cash considerations | To Los Angeles Clippers: Johni Broome; 2027 second-round pick | |

=== Free agency ===
==== Re-signed ====
| Date | Player | Ref. |

==== Additions ====
| Date | Player | Former Team | Ref. |
|---|---|---|---|
| July 5, 2026 | Caleb Love | Portland Trail Blazers / Rip City Remix | |
| July 6, 2026 | Ariel Hukporti | New York Knicks | |
| July 6, 2026 | Anfernee Simons | Chicago Bulls | |
| July 6, 2026 | Dean Wade | Cleveland Cavaliers | |
| July 8, 2026 | Rayan Rupert | Memphis Grizzlies / Memphis Hustle | |
| July 26, 2026 | LeBron James | Los Angeles Lakers | |
| August 5, 2026 | Kentavious Caldwell-Pope | Memphis Grizzlies | |

==== Subtractions ====
| Player | Reason | New Team | Ref. |
|---|---|---|---|
| Andre Drummond | Free agency | New York Knicks | |
| Quentin Grimes | Free agency | Los Angeles Lakers | |
| Kyle Lowry | Retired | | |
| Kelly Oubre Jr. | Free agency | Indiana Pacers | |
| Tyrese Martin | Free agency | FC Barcelona (Spain) | |
| Dalen Terry | Waived | Golden State Warriors | |
| Trendon Watford | Free agency | New Orleans Pelicans | |
