= Dumont Public Schools =

School district in Bergen County, New Jersey, US

Coordinates: 40.937201°N 73.987629°W

Address
- 25 Depew Street Dumont, Bergen County, New Jersey, 07628; United States

District information
- Grades: PreK-12
- Superintendent: Maria Poidomani
- Business administrator: Michael Bessler
- Schools: 5

Students and staff
- Enrollment: 2,540 (as of 2020–21)
- Faculty: 208.0 FTEs
- Student–teacher ratio: 12.2:1

Other information
- District Factor Group: FG
- Website: District website
Ind.	Per pupil	District spending	Rank (*)	K-12 average	%± vs. average
1A	Total Spending	$17,547	27	$18,891	−7.1%
1	Budgetary Cost	14,128	40	14,783	−4.4%
2	Classroom Instruction	8,678	50	8,763	−1.0%
6	Support Services	1,560	3	2,392	−34.8%
8	Administrative Cost	1,746	57	1,485	17.6%
10	Operations & Maintenance	1,764	49	1,783	−1.1%
13	Extracurricular Activities	354	22	268	32.1%
16	Median Teacher Salary	65,460	44	64,043
Data from NJDoE 2014 Taxpayers' Guide to Education Spending. *Of K-12 districts with 1,800-3,500 students. Lowest spending=1; Highest=68

The Dumont Public Schools are a comprehensive community public school district that serves students in pre-kindergarten through twelfth grade from Dumont, in Bergen County, in the U.S. state of New Jersey.

As of the 2020–21 school year, the district, comprising five schools, had an enrollment of 2,540 students and 208.0 classroom teachers (on an FTE basis), for a student–teacher ratio of 12.2:1.

The district is classified by the New Jersey Department of Education as being in District Factor Group "FG", the fourth-highest of eight groupings. District Factor Groups organize districts statewide to allow comparison by common socioeconomic characteristics of the local districts. From lowest socioeconomic status to highest, the categories are A, B, CD, DE, FG, GH, I and J.

== History ==
Genevieve Via Cava, a former special education teacher for the district, bequeathed the school district $1 million after her 2011 death. She retired from teaching in 1990 and had no remaining immediate family. The donation was revealed in 2018.

== Schools ==
Schools in the district (with 2020–21 enrollment data from the National Center for Education Statistics) are:

Elementary schools

- Grant School with 390 students in grades K-5 (opened 1911)
  - Sheri Weinstein, principal
- Honiss School with 632 students in grades K-8 (opened 1955)
  - Karen Bennett, principal
- Lincoln School with 156 students in grades K-5 (opened 1911)
  - Luis D. Lopez, principal
- Selzer School with 500 students in grades PreK-8 (opened 1960)
  - Jacqueline J. Bello, principal

High school

- Dumont High School with 788 students in grades 9-12 (opened 1932)
  - James Wichmann, principal

== Administration ==
Core members of the schools administration are:

- Maria Poidomani, superintendent
- Kevin Cartotto, business administrator and board secretary

== Board of education ==
The district's board of education, comprised of nine members, sets policy and oversees the fiscal and educational operation of the district through its administration. As a Type II school district, the board's trustees are elected directly by voters to serve three-year terms of office on a staggered basis, with three seats up for election each year held (since 2012) as part of the November general election. The board appoints a superintendent to oversee the district's day-to-day operations and a business administrator to supervise the business functions of the district.
