= Jerry Palmieri =

American football coach (born 1958)

Gerard Anthony Palmieri (born October 30, 1958) is an American football strength and conditioning coach. Palmieri most recently served on Tom Coughlin's staff for the New York Giants, a position he served in for 12 seasons. During those years, the Giants won Super Bowl XLII and Super Bowl XLVI. Palmieri was also on Tom Coughlin's staff with the Jacksonville Jaguars from 1995 to 2002 when their teams competed in two AFC Championship Games. Palmieri spent 2003 as an assistant strength & conditioning coach for the New Orleans Saints. Prior to his NFL career he held head strength coach positions at Boston College from 1993 to 1994, where he served under Tom Coughlin and Dan Henning respectively, and at Kansas State from 1987 to 1992 where he was a part of the Bill Snyder transformation of the team. Palmieri began his strength & conditioning career as a part-time strength coach while he earned his master's degree at the University of North Carolina at Chapel Hill from 1982 to 1983, and then an assistant strength & conditioning coach at Oklahoma State University from 1984 to 1986.

== College ==
Palmieri attended Dumont High School in Dumont, New Jersey, beginning his career there as an amateur boxer in 1974. Palmieri attended Montclair State College (now Montclair State University) from 1976 to 1980, graduating with a degree in Physical Education.

While in college, Palmieri won New Jersey Golden Gloves Light Heavyweight titles in 1976, 1977, and 1978. Also in 1978, he became a semi-finalist in the National Golden Gloves Tournament and was ranked 5th among light heavyweights. Palmieri competed internationally against the Soviet Union and Romania.

== Coaching career ==
=== Early career ===
In 1982, Palmieri began his career in strength and conditioning as a part-time coach for one year at the University of North Carolina at Chapel Hill. One of his students was the future NBA basketball player Michael Jordan.

In 1984, Palmieri became an assistant strength and conditioning coach at Oklahoma State University. Working under coach John Stucky, Palmieri worked with future NFL football players Thurman Thomas and Barry Sanders, future MLB baseball player Pete Incaviglia and amateur wrestler John Smith. Palmieri left Oklahoma State in 1986.

=== Kansas State University ===
In 1987, Palmieri became the head strength and conditioning coach at Kansas State University. While Palmieri was primarily responsible for football, he and his staff extended the strength and conditioning program to varsity athletes in all campus sports. Palmieri left Kansas State in 1993.

=== Boston College ===
In 1993 Palmieri trained the Wildcats through summer conditioning, and then left KSU in August to join Tom Coughlin at Boston College. Following the 1993 season, KSU went to their first bowl game since 1982, only their second bowl appearance in school history.

As Palmieri did at Kansas State, he and his staff broadened the strength & conditioning program by making training programs available to all of the varsity sports on campus. His first year at Boston College was highlighted by an upset win over #1 ranked Notre Dame and defeating The University of Virginia in the Carquest Bowl. Following Coughlin's departure to the Jacksonville Jaguars, Palmieri was retained by BC's new head football coach, Dan Henning. The 1994 season brought another victory over Notre Dame and a win over Kansas State in the Aloha Bowl. Among the many athletes Palmieri coached, he had the privilege to train such BC stars as Pete Mitchell, Stephen Boyd, and Mike Mamula. Palmieri was recognized as the National Strength & Conditioning Association Professional of the Year for the Big East Conference.

=== Jacksonville Jaguars ===
In 1995, Palmieri again joined Tom Coughlin's staff, this time with the NFL expansion team, the Jacksonville Jaguars. His eight years with the Jaguars were highlighted by two AFC championship appearances (1996, 1999) and training great athletes such as, Tony Boselli, Mark Brunell, Keenan McCardell, and Jimmy Smith. In 1999, he was named the Professional Strength and Conditioning Coaches Society coach of the year. Following three losing seasons, Coach Coughlin and his staff was fired by owner Wayne Weaver after the 2002 season.

=== New York Giants ===
After spending the 2003 season as Rock Gullickson's assistant with the New Orleans Saints, Palmieri again reunited with Tom Coughlin as the strength & conditioning coach for the New York Giants. Over his 12 years in this position, Palmieri was a part of two Super Bowl Championships (XLII and XLVI), received the Contribution to Amateur Football Award presented by the National Football Foundation and College Hall of Fame (2007), named Samson's NFL Strength & Conditioning Coach of the Year (2007), and the YMCA of Greater Bergen County Professional of the Year (2010).

Desiring to reduce player injuries, at Tom Coughlin's request, Palmieri researched GPS tracking technology. In the spring of 2013 the Giants hired a Performance Manager and began to implement GPS tracking of the athletes in an attempt to manage their health. Additional scientific modalities were employed to manage the players’ health, such as sleep, player readiness, blood testing, and hydration. Furthermore, Palmieri made significant adjustments to his training program, while Coach Coughlin adjusted his weekly practice schedule allowing for greater recovery. Despite these attempts to reduce injuries, statistically the Giants were among the most injured teams in the NFL. Palmieri was reassigned to another role within the Giants organization on January 15, 2016. The Giants led the league in players on injured reserve in each of Palmieri's last three years with the Giants (2013, 2014, 2015).

During Palmieri's tenure with the Giants he trained players such as Michael Strahan, Eli Manning, Chris Snee, Osi Umenyiora, Victor Cruz, and Odell Beckham Jr.

== Personal life ==
A resident of Waldwick, New Jersey, Palmieri is the youngest of six children from Tony and Frances Palmieri. He married his high school sweetheart, Ellen Cassarino, in 1981. Together they have two married children. He and his wife are very supportive of Christian ministries in particular Focus on the Family and The Fellowship of Christian Athletes. They are active members of Cornerstone Christian Church located in Wyckoff, New Jersey.
