= Sean Lissemore =

American football player (born 1987)

No. 95, 98
- Position: Defensive end

Personal information
- Born: September 11, 1987 (age 39); Teaneck, New Jersey, U.S.
- Listed height: 6 ft 4 in (1.93 m)
- Listed weight: 286 lb (130 kg)

Career information
- High school: Dumont (Dumont, New Jersey)
- College: William & Mary
- NFL draft: 2010: 7th round, 234th overall pick

Career history
- Dallas Cowboys (2010–2012); San Diego Chargers (2013–2016)

Awards and highlights
- All-American (2009); First-team All-CAA (2009)

Career NFL statistics
- Total tackles: 135
- Sacks: 6.5
- Pass deflections: 1
- Interceptions: 1
- Defensive touchdowns: 1
- Stats at Pro Football Reference

Sean Lissemore (born September 11, 1987) is an American former professional football player who was a defensive end in the National Football League (NFL) for the Dallas Cowboys and San Diego Chargers. He was selected by the Cowboys in the seventh round of the 2010 NFL draft. He played college football for the William & Mary Tribe.

== Early life ==
Lissemore grew up in Dumont, New Jersey. He attended Dumont High School, where he was a three-year starter, both at offensive guard, defensive end and linebacker.

As a senior, he handled kickoff duties, recorded 120 total tackles, nine sacks and one interception in his senior season. For his performance, he was selected to the First-team All-league as a linebacker and All-North Jersey Group 2, was invited to the Governor's Bowl and Bergen All-Star game and earned honorable mention all-county honors.

He was a four-year letterman and an all-league performer in track & field in the 100 (11.2 seconds) and 200 metres (23 seconds). He also competed in the shot put (51 ft or 15.67m) and the discus (140 ft or 42.67 m). He was also a three-year letter winner in wrestling, where he was an All-league performer and state medalist in the 215 pound weight class.

Outside of athletics, he was also a member of Captains for Tomorrows Children and the school's jazz band where he played the saxophone.

== College career ==
Lissemore accepted a football scholarship from the College of William & Mary and majored in kinesiology. As a redshirt freshman in 2006, he collected 33 tackles (2.5 for loss) and one sack.

As a sophomore in 2007, he suffered a torn shoulder labrum and started 10-of-11 games at defensive tackle. He recorded 43 tackles (4 for loss), 2 sacks and one interception.

As a junior in 2008, he started all 11 games, registering 51 tackles (7.5 for loss), and 4 sacks. On the season, he was the W&M QB Club Defensive Player of the Week twice (Towson/Richmond) and Special Teams Player of the Week once (New Hampshire). Against the University of New Hampshire he had 10 tackles, 1.5 tackles for loss and one sack.

As a senior in 2009, he posted 66 tackles (14 for loss), 2 interceptions, 4 quarterback hurries, 4 passes defensed and one blocked kick, all while starting 14 games. He served as a team captain and along with future NFL player Adrian Tracy, contributed to a defense that allowed 61 rushing yards per game (first in the nation), 229 offensive yards per game (second in the nation), 12 points per game (second in the nation), 27 turnovers (13th nationally), 3.43 sacks per game (third in the nation), 8 tackles for loss per game (eighth in the nation) and a 28.1% conversion rate on 3rd down opportunities. He earned All-American honors from College Sporting News and Sports Network while also being selected to the All-CAA First Team. He played in the Texas vs The Nation All-Star Game.

== Professional career ==
=== Pre-draft ===
At his Pro Day, he recorded 36 reps 225 pounds, he also ran a 4.83 second 40-yard dash and record a 30" vertical jump. In April before the draft, he was invited to a private workout with the New York Giants.

=== Dallas Cowboys ===
Lissemore was selected by the Dallas Cowboys in the seventh round (234th overall) of the 2010 NFL draft. He was declared inactive for the first 6 games of the season. He appeared in only two games, making his NFL debut in week eight against the Jacksonville Jaguars, where he recorded three tackles and half of a sack. He injured his left ankle on the opening kickoff of the ninth game against the Green Bay Packers and missed the next 3 contests before being placed on the injured reserve list on December 4.

In 2011, Lissemore played in all 16 games as a reserve defensive end in the team's 3–4 defense. He finished the year with 39 tackles (2 for loss), 2 sacks and 5 quarterback hurries. He also returned his first career kickoff for 38 yards against the Detroit Lions. Pro Football Focus determined that Lissemore was the third most efficient player on the entire Cowboys' defense in 2011, as well as the team's top run defender, making 14 stops on 107 run plays.

In 2012, he played in 10 games, starting 6 at nose tackle in place of an injured Jay Ratliff. In September, the Cowboys reached a three-year extension with Lissemore. Lissemore's deal was worth $6 million (plus incentives), had $3.1 million guaranteed and included a $2 million signing bonus. He suffered an ankle injury in the fifth game against the Baltimore Ravens, forcing him to miss the next 6 contests with an ankle injury. On the season, he tallied 43 tackles, one sack and one quarterback pressure. He had 10 tackles against the Seattle Seahawks.

In 2013, the team switched to a 4–3 defense and Lissemore was traded to the San Diego Chargers in exchange for a 2015 seventh-round pick (#236-Mark Nzeocha) on September 1, because he wasn't seen as a good fit for the new scheme.

=== San Diego Chargers ===
In 2013, he played in 15 games (2 starts), registering 31 tackles (5 for loss), 2 sacks, 1 interception and a touchdown. Lissemore was productive all season, especially in the run game, posting a PFF score of +5.7 and was named the starting nose tackle in December. Lissemore intercepted a Robert Griffin III pass for a touchdown against the Washington Redskins. He missed the playoffs after suffering a shoulder injury.

In 2014, played as the starting nose tackle and saw action in 15 games, finishing with 32 tackles and one sack. He recovered a fumble in overtime against the 49ers that helped the Chargers overcome a large second half deficit and win the game 38–35.

In 2015, he appeared in 11 games (5 starts), tallying 17 tackles and 3 quarterback pressures, before being placed on the injured reserve list with a shoulder injury on December 28, after he missed 4 games.

On August 15, 2016, he was placed again on the injured reserve list after not recovering from his previous shoulder injury. Lissemore was named the team's 2016 NFL-USAA Salute to Service Award Nominee.

In 2017, he wasn't re-signed and announced his retirement on September 15.

== NFL career statistics ==
Legend
| **Bold** | Career high |

| Year | Team | Games | | Tackles | | | | | Interceptions | | | | | Fumbles | | | |
| Year | Team | GP | GS | Cmb | Solo | Ast | Sck | TFL | Int | Yds | TD | Lng | PD | FF | FR | Yds | TD |
|---|---|---|---|---|---|---|---|---|---|---|---|---|---|---|---|---|---|
| 2010 | DAL | 2 | 0 | 3 | 2 | 1 | 0.5 | 0 | 0 | 0 | 0 | 0 | 0 | 0 | 0 | 0 | 0 |
| 2011 | DAL | **16** | 0 | 28 | **19** | 9 | **2.0** | **4** | 0 | 0 | 0 | 0 | 0 | 0 | 0 | 0 | 0 |
| 2012 | DAL | 10 | 6 | **35** | 15 | **20** | 1.0 | 1 | 0 | 0 | 0 | 0 | 0 | 0 | 0 | 0 | 0 |
| 2013 | SDG | 15 | 2 | 24 | 18 | 6 | **2.0** | 3 | **1** | 0 | **1** | 0 | **1** | 0 | 0 | 0 | 0 |
| 2014 | SDG | 15 | **8** | 29 | 16 | 13 | 1.0 | 1 | 0 | 0 | 0 | 0 | 0 | 0 | **1** | 0 | 0 |
| 2015 | SDG | 11 | 5 | 16 | 8 | 8 | 0.0 | 0 | 0 | 0 | 0 | 0 | 0 | 0 | 0 | 0 | 0 |
| Career | | 69 | 21 | 135 | 78 | 57 | 6.5 | 9 | 1 | 0 | 1 | 0 | 1 | 0 | 1 | 0 | 0 |

== Personal life ==
In 2019, he was named the athletic director at St. Mark's School of Texas.
