= 2025–26 Philadelphia 76ers season =

2025–26 NBA season by team

- Head coach: Nick Nurse
- President: Daryl Morey
- General manager: Elton Brand
- Owner: Josh Harris
- Arena: Xfinity Mobile Arena

Results
- Record: 45–37 (.549)
- Place: Division: 4th (Atlantic); Conference: 7th (Eastern)
- Playoff finish: Conference semifinals (lost to Knicks 0–4)
- Stats at Basketball Reference

Local media
- Television: NBCSPHI, NBCSPHI+, 6ABC
- Radio: WPEN

The 2025–26 Philadelphia 76ers season was the 77th season for the franchise in the National Basketball Association (NBA). With their win against the Milwaukee Bucks on January 27, the 76ers improved on their 24–58 record from their previous season.

On April 12, the 76ers qualified for the play-in tournament and finished the regular season with a 45–37 record, the same as the Orlando Magic. Philadelphia secured the 7th seed in the Eastern Conference as they held the tiebreaker over Orlando through a 2–1 season series win. On April 15, they clinched a playoff spot after defeating Orlando in the first stage of the play-in, returning to the playoffs after a one-year absence. They faced the Boston Celtics in the first round of the playoffs, defeating Boston in seven games after successfully coming back from a 3–1 series deficit for the first time in franchise history and securing their first series win against their archrivals since 1982. However, they were swept by the eventual NBA champion New York Knicks in the Eastern Conference semifinals. This was the first time in NBA history that a team came back from down 3–1 and then proceeded to get swept in the same postseason.

== Draft ==
Round	Pick	Player	Position(s)	Nationality	College
1	3	V. J. Edgecombe	Shooting Guard	The Bahamas	Baylor
2	35	Johni Broome	Center	United States	Auburn

The 76ers entered the draft holding one first-round pick and one second-round pick. The Oklahoma City Thunder held a 36.0% chance of acquiring the first-round pick as part of the Al Horford-for-Danny Green trade in 2020; however, Philadelphia retained it after falling within the top six in the lottery.

== Roster ==
2025–26 Philadelphia 76ers roster
Players

Pos.	No.	Player	Height	Weight	DOB	From
F	25	Dominick Barlow	6 ft 9 in (2.06 m)	215 lb (98 kg)	2003-05-26	Saint Joseph's
F	16	MarJon Beauchamp (TW)	6 ft 7 in (2.01 m)	199 lb (90 kg)	2000-10-12	Yakima Valley College
F/C	30	Adem Bona	6 ft 10 in (2.08 m)	235 lb (107 kg)	2003-03-28	UCLA
F	22	Johni Broome	6 ft 10 in (2.08 m)	235 lb (107 kg)	2002-07-19	Auburn
C	1	Andre Drummond	6 ft 11 in (2.11 m)	279 lb (127 kg)	1993-08-10	Connecticut
G	77	V. J. Edgecombe	6 ft 4 in (1.93 m)	180 lb (82 kg)	2005-07-30	Baylor
F	11	Justin Edwards	6 ft 7 in (2.01 m)	203 lb (92 kg)	2003-12-16	Kentucky
C	21	Joel Embiid	7 ft 0 in (2.13 m)	280 lb (127 kg)	1994-03-16	Kansas
F	8	Paul George	6 ft 8 in (2.03 m)	220 lb (100 kg)	1990-05-02	Fresno State
G	5	Quentin Grimes	6 ft 4 in (1.93 m)	210 lb (95 kg)	2000-05-08	Houston
G	7	Kyle Lowry	6 ft 0 in (1.83 m)	196 lb (89 kg)	1986-03-25	Villanova
G/F	23	Tyrese Martin (TW)	6 ft 6 in (1.98 m)	215 lb (98 kg)	1999-03-07	Connecticut
G	0	Tyrese Maxey	6 ft 2 in (1.88 m)	200 lb (91 kg)	2000-10-04	Kentucky
G/F	9	Kelly Oubre Jr.	6 ft 8 in (2.03 m)	203 lb (92 kg)	1995-12-09	Kansas
F	14	Dalen Terry	6 ft 6 in (1.98 m)	195 lb (88 kg)	2002-07-12	Arizona
F	33	Jabari Walker	6 ft 7 in (2.01 m)	237 lb (108 kg)	2002-07-30	Colorado
F	12	Trendon Watford	6 ft 8 in (2.03 m)	237 lb (108 kg)	2000-11-09	LSU

Coaches
Head coach
- Nick Nurse
Assistant(s)
- Matt Brase
- Fabulous Flournoy
- Bryan Gates
- Rico Hines
- Coby Karl
- Mike Longabardi
- Doug West

Legend
- (DP) Unsigned draft pick
- (FA) Free agent
- (S) Suspended
- (GL) On assignment to G League affiliate
- (TW) Two-way affiliate player
- Injured

Roster
Updated: April 11, 2026

== Standings ==
=== Division ===
Atlantic Division	W	L	PCT	GB	Home	Road	Div	GP
y – Boston Celtics	56	26	.683	–	30‍–‍11	26‍–‍15	10‍–‍6	82
x – New York Knicks	53	29	.646	3.0	30‍–‍10	23‍–‍19	14‍–‍3	82
x – Toronto Raptors	46	36	.561	10.0	24‍–‍17	22‍–‍19	5‍–‍12	82
x – Philadelphia 76ers	45	37	.549	11.0	23‍–‍18	22‍–‍19	9‍–‍7	82
Brooklyn Nets	20	62	.244	36.0	12‍–‍29	8‍–‍33	3‍–‍13	82

=== Conference ===
Eastern Conference
#	Team	W	L	PCT	GB	GP
1	c – Detroit Pistons *	60	22	.732	–	82
2	y – Boston Celtics *	56	26	.683	4.0	82
3	x – New York Knicks	53	29	.646	7.0	82
4	x – Cleveland Cavaliers	52	30	.634	8.0	82
5	x – Toronto Raptors	46	36	.561	14.0	82
6	y – Atlanta Hawks *	46	36	.561	14.0	82
7	x – Philadelphia 76ers	45	37	.549	15.0	82
8	x – Orlando Magic	45	37	.549	15.0	82
9	pi – Charlotte Hornets	44	38	.537	16.0	82
10	pi – Miami Heat	43	39	.524	17.0	82
11	Milwaukee Bucks	32	50	.390	28.0	82
12	Chicago Bulls	31	51	.378	29.0	82
13	Brooklyn Nets	20	62	.244	40.0	82
14	Indiana Pacers	19	63	.232	41.0	82
15	Washington Wizards	17	65	.207	43.0	82

== Game log ==
=== Preseason ===
2025 preseason game log
Total: 1–3 (Home: 1–2; Road: 0–1)
Preseason: 1–3 (home: 1–2; road: 0–1)

Game	Date	Team	Score	High points	High rebounds	High assists	Location Attendance	Record
1	October 2	@ New York	L 84–99	Edgecombe, Maxey (14)	Dominick Barlow (10)	Tyrese Maxey (4)	(United Arab Emirates) Etihad Arena; 11,983	0–1
2	October 4	New York	L 104–112	Tyrese Maxey (16)	Andre Drummond (11)	Kennedy Chandler (6)	(United Arab Emirates) Etihad Arena	0–2
3	October 10	Orlando	L 98–128	Tyrese Maxey (17)	Dominick Barlow (9)	Chandler, Edwards (5)	Xfinity Mobile Arena; 16,496	0–3
4	October 17	Minnesota	W 126–110	Tyrese Maxey (27)	Bona, Embiid (7)	Joel Embiid (8)	Xfinity Mobile Arena; 17,824	1–3

2025–26 preseason schedule

=== Regular season ===
2025–26 game log
Total: 45–37 (Home: 23–18; Road: 22–19)
October: 4–1 (home: 2–1; road: 2–0)

Game	Date	Team	Score	High points	High rebounds	High assists	Location Attendance	Record
1	October 22	@ Boston	W 117–116	Tyrese Maxey (40)	Dominick Barlow (8)	Tyrese Maxey (6)	TD Garden; 19,156	1−0
2	October 25	Charlotte	W 125–121	Tyrese Maxey (28)	Andre Drummond (13)	Tyrese Maxey (9)	Xfinity Mobile Arena; 19,124	2–0
3	October 27	Orlando	W 136–124	Tyrese Maxey (43)	Kelly Oubre Jr. (10)	Tyrese Maxey (8)	Xfinity Mobile Arena; 18,377	3–0
4	October 28	@ Washington	W 139–134 (OT)	Tyrese Maxey (39)	Kelly Oubre Jr. (11)	Tyrese Maxey (10)	Capital One Arena; 15,529	4–0
5	October 31	Boston	L 108–109	Tyrese Maxey (26)	Kelly Oubre Jr. (9)	Tyrese Maxey (14)	Xfinity Mobile Arena; 19,746	4–1

November: 6–8 (home: 3–5; road: 3–3)

Game	Date	Team	Score	High points	High rebounds	High assists	Location Attendance	Record
6	November 2	@ Brooklyn	W 129–105	Kelly Oubre Jr. (29)	Trendon Watford (9)	Quentin Grimes (13)	Barclays Center; 17,548	5–1
7	November 4	@ Chicago	L 111–113	Tyrese Maxey (39)	V. J. Edgecombe (11)	Tyrese Maxey (5)	United Center; 21,016	5–2
8	November 5	@ Cleveland	L 121–132	Grimes, Maxey (27)	Andre Drummond (13)	Tyrese Maxey (9)	Rocket Arena; 19,432	5–3
9	November 8	Toronto	W 130–120	Tyrese Maxey (31)	Trendon Watford (17)	Trendon Watford (10)	Xfinity Mobile Arena; 19,746	6–3
10	November 9	Detroit	L 108–111	Tyrese Maxey (33)	Andre Drummond (12)	Tyrese Maxey (7)	Xfinity Mobile Arena; 18,520	6–4
11	November 11	Boston	W 102–100	Justin Edwards (22)	Andre Drummond (13)	Tyrese Maxey (9)	Xfinity Mobile Arena; 19,746	7–4
12	November 14	@ Detroit	L 105–114	Tyrese Maxey (31)	Andre Drummond (11)	Quentin Grimes (5)	Little Caesars Arena; 20,062	7–5
13	November 17	L.A. Clippers	W 110–108	Tyrese Maxey (39)	Andre Drummond (18)	Edgecombe, Maxey (6)	Xfinity Mobile Arena; 18,008	8–5
14	November 19	Toronto	L 112–121	Tyrese Maxey (24)	Andre Drummond (12)	Tyrese Maxey (9)	Xfinity Mobile Arena; 17,077	8–6
15	November 20	@ Milwaukee	W 123–114 (OT)	Tyrese Maxey (54)	V. J. Edgecombe (10)	Tyrese Maxey (9)	Fiserv Forum; 16,574	9–6
16	November 23	Miami	L 117–127	Tyrese Maxey (27)	Andre Drummond (24)	Trendon Watford (7)	Xfinity Mobile Arena; 18,850	9–7
17	November 25	Orlando	L 103–144	Tyrese Maxey (20)	Andre Drummond (12)	Grimes, Maxey (4)	Xfinity Mobile Arena; 19,746	9–8
18	November 28	@ Brooklyn	W 115–103	Tyrese Maxey (22)	Dominick Barlow (10)	Quentin Grimes (9)	Barclays Center; 17,809	10–8
19	November 30	Atlanta	L 134–142 (2OT)	Tyrese Maxey (44)	Quentin Grimes (10)	Tyrese Maxey (9)	Xfinity Mobile Arena; 17,225	10–9

December: 7–5 (home: 4–2; road: 3–3)

Game	Date	Team	Score	High points	High rebounds	High assists	Location Attendance	Record
20	December 2	Washington	W 121–102	Tyrese Maxey (35)	Jabari Walker (12)	Edgecombe, Maxey (6)	Xfinity Mobile Arena; 16,743	11–9
21	December 4	Golden State	W 99–98	Tyrese Maxey (35)	Dominick Barlow (14)	Quentin Grimes (6)	Xfinity Mobile Arena; 18,221	12–9
22	December 5	@ Milwaukee	W 116–101	Quentin Grimes (22)	Bona, Drummond, McCain (6)	George, Grimes (5)	Fiserv Forum; 17,341	13–9
23	December 7	L.A. Lakers	L 108–112	Tyrese Maxey (28)	Andre Drummond (12)	Tyrese Maxey (9)	Xfinity Mobile Arena; 20,431	13–10
24	December 12	Indiana	W 115–105	Joel Embiid (39)	Drummond, Embiid, Grimes (9)	Edgecombe, George (5)	Xfinity Mobile Arena; 19,746	14–10
25	December 14	@ Atlanta	L 117–120	Paul George (35)	Joel Embiid (14)	Quentin Grimes (7)	State Farm Arena; 16,250	14–11
26	December 19	@ New York	W 116–107	Tyrese Maxey (30)	Andre Drummond (13)	Tyrese Maxey (9)	Madison Square Garden; 19,812	15–11
27	December 20	Dallas	W 121–114	Tyrese Maxey (38)	Andre Drummond (12)	Quentin Grimes (7)	Xfinity Mobile Arena; 19,056	16–11
28	December 23	Brooklyn	L 106–114	Joel Embiid (27)	Andre Drummond (13)	Embiid, McCain (4)	Xfinity Mobile Arena; 19,746	16–12
29	December 26	@ Chicago	L 102–109	Joel Embiid (31)	Paul George (12)	Tyrese Maxey (8)	United Center; 20,952	16–13
30	December 28	@ Oklahoma City	L 104–129	Tyrese Maxey (28)	Adem Bona (8)	Edgecombe, Maxey (5)	Paycom Center; 18,203	16–14
31	December 30	@ Memphis	W 139–136 (OT)	Embiid, Maxey (34)	Joel Embiid (10)	Tyrese Maxey (12)	FedExForum; 15,668	17–14

January: 10–7 (home: 6–5; road: 4–2)

Game	Date	Team	Score	High points	High rebounds	High assists	Location Attendance	Record
32	January 1	@ Dallas	W 123–108	Tyrese Maxey (34)	Tyrese Maxey (8)	Tyrese Maxey (10)	American Airlines Center; 19,832	18–14
33	January 3	@ New York	W 130–119	Tyrese Maxey (36)	Joel Embiid (10)	Paul George (6)	Madison Square Garden; 19,390	19–14
34	January 5	Denver	L 124–125 (OT)	Joel Embiid (32)	Joel Embiid (10)	V. J. Edgecombe (9)	Xfinity Mobile Arena; 18,521	19–15
35	January 7	Washington	W 131–110	Joel Embiid (28)	Joel Embiid (7)	Tyrese Maxey (8)	Xfinity Mobile Arena; 19,746	20–15
36	January 9	@ Orlando	W 103–91	Tyrese Maxey (29)	Barlow, Edgecombe, Embiid, George (9)	V. J. Edgecombe (7)	Kia Center; 19,271	21–15
37	January 11	@ Toronto	L 115–116 (OT)	Tyrese Maxey (38)	Quentin Grimes (7)	Tyrese Maxey (5)	Scotiabank Arena; 18,130	21–16
38	January 12	@ Toronto	W 115–102	Tyrese Maxey (33)	Joel Embiid (8)	V. J. Edgecombe (8)	Scotiabank Arena; 18,127	22–16
39	January 14	Cleveland	L 107–133	Joel Embiid (20)	Andre Drummond (9)	George, Maxey, Watford (4)	Xfinity Mobile Arena; 19,746	22–17
40	January 16	Cleveland	L 115–117	Joel Embiid (33)	Quentin Grimes (7)	Tyrese Maxey (9)	Xfinity Mobile Arena; 19,746	22–18
41	January 19	Indiana	W 113–104	Joel Embiid (30)	Joel Embiid (9)	Tyrese Maxey (8)	Xfinity Mobile Arena; 18,005	23–18
42	January 20	Phoenix	L 110–116	V. J. Edgecombe (25)	Andre Drummond (15)	Tyrese Maxey (7)	Xfinity Mobile Arena; 17,839	23–19
43	January 22	Houston	W 128–122 (OT)	Tyrese Maxey (36)	Joel Embiid (15)	Embiid, Maxey (10)	Xfinity Mobile Arena; 19,746	24–19
44	January 24	New York	L 109–112	Joel Embiid (38)	Joel Embiid (11)	Tyrese Maxey (6)	Xfinity Mobile Arena; 19,746	24–20
45	January 26	@ Charlotte	L 93–130	Kelly Oubre Jr. (17)	Andre Drummond (7)	Tyrese Maxey (7)	Spectrum Center; 16,361	24–21
46	January 27	Milwaukee	W 139–122	Paul George (32)	Joel Embiid (9)	Tyrese Maxey (9)	Xfinity Mobile Arena; 16,917	25–21
47	January 29	Sacramento	W 113–111	Tyrese Maxey (40)	Edgecombe, Embiid (5)	Embiid, Maxey (8)	Xfinity Mobile Arena; 18,608	26–21
48	January 31	New Orleans	W 124–114	Joel Embiid (40)	Joel Embiid (11)	Tyrese Maxey (8)	Xfinity Mobile Arena; 20,096	27–21

February: 6–5 (home: 1–2; road: 5–3)

Game	Date	Team	Score	High points	High rebounds	High assists	Location Attendance	Record
49	February 2	@ L.A. Clippers	W 128–113	Tyrese Maxey (29)	Dominick Barlow (16)	V. J. Edgecombe (7)	Intuit Dome; 17,927	28–21
50	February 3	@ Golden State	W 113–94	V. J. Edgecombe (25)	Andre Drummond (12)	V. J. Edgecombe (7)	Chase Center; 18,064	29–21
51	February 5	@ L.A. Lakers	L 115–119	Joel Embiid (35)	V. J. Edgecombe (10)	Tyrese Maxey (13)	Crypto.com Arena; 18,731	29–22
52	February 7	@ Phoenix	W 109–103	Joel Embiid (33)	Embiid, Maxey (9)	Tyrese Maxey (6)	Mortgage Matchup Center; 17,071	30–22
53	February 9	@ Portland	L 118–135	Tyrese Maxey (30)	Andre Drummond (7)	Andre Drummond (5)	Moda Center; 16,025	30–23
54	February 11	New York	L 89–138	Tyrese Maxey (32)	Kelly Oubre Jr. (7)	Oubre Jr., Watford (4)	Xfinity Mobile Arena; 19,746	30–24
All-Star Game
55	February 19	Atlanta	L 107–117	Tyrese Maxey (28)	Andre Drummond (14)	Cameron Payne (5)	Xfinity Mobile Arena; 19,746	30–25
56	February 21	@ New Orleans	L 111–126	Tyrese Maxey (27)	Andre Drummond (12)	Tyrese Maxey (7)	Smoothie King Center; 16,426	30–26
57	February 22	@ Minnesota	W 135–108	Tyrese Maxey (39)	Andre Drummond (9)	Tyrese Maxey (8)	Target Center; 18,978	31–26
58	February 24	@ Indiana	W 135–114	Tyrese Maxey (32)	Tyrese Maxey (9)	Tyrese Maxey (8)	Gainbridge Fieldhouse; 16,540	32–26
59	February 26	Miami	W 124–117	Tyrese Maxey (28)	Joel Embiid (11)	Tyrese Maxey (11)	Xfinity Mobile Arena; 19,746	33–26

March: 8–8 (home: 5–2; road: 3–6)

Game	Date	Team	Score	High points	High rebounds	High assists	Location Attendance	Record
60	March 1	@ Boston	L 98–114	Tyrese Maxey (33)	Andre Drummond (12)	Tyrese Maxey (6)	TD Garden; 19,156	33–27
61	March 3	San Antonio	L 91–131	Tyrese Maxey (21)	Tyrese Maxey (8)	Tyrese Martin (4)	Xfinity Mobile Arena; 19,746	33–28
62	March 4	Utah	W 106–102	Tyrese Maxey (25)	Jabari Walker (10)	Tyrese Maxey (6)	Xfinity Mobile Arena; 18,386	34–28
63	March 7	@ Atlanta	L 116–125	Tyrese Maxey (31)	Bona, Drummond (7)	Cameron Payne (6)	State Farm Arena; 17,174	34–29
64	March 9	@ Cleveland	L 101–115	Quentin Grimes (17)	Bona, Drummond (7)	Payne, Terry (4)	Rocket Arena; 19,432	34–30
65	March 10	Memphis	W 139–129	Cameron Payne (32)	Kelly Oubre Jr. (12)	Cameron Payne (10)	Xfinity Mobile Arena; 17,897	35–30
66	March 12	@ Detroit	L 109–131	MarJon Beauchamp (17)	Justin Edwards (9)	Edwards, Grimes (5)	Little Caesars Arena; 20,062	35–31
67	March 14	Brooklyn	W 104–97	Quentin Grimes (28)	Adem Bona (10)	V. J. Edgecombe (7)	Xfinity Mobile Arena; 18,418	36–31
68	March 15	Portland	W 109–103	Quentin Grimes (31)	Andre Drummond (17)	Andre Drummond (4)	Xfinity Mobile Arena; 19,746	37–31
69	March 17	@ Denver	L 96–124	MarJon Beauchamp (16)	Andre Drummond (10)	Trendon Watford (6)	Ball Arena; 19,917	37–32
70	March 19	@ Sacramento	W 139–118	V. J. Edgecombe (38)	Andre Drummond (11)	V. J. Edgecombe (11)	Golden 1 Center; 15,007	38–32
71	March 21	@ Utah	W 126–116	Quentin Grimes (25)	V. J. Edgecombe (13)	Cameron Payne (7)	Delta Center; 18,186	39–32
72	March 23	Oklahoma City	L 103–123	V. J. Edgecombe (35)	Dominick Barlow (7)	Cameron Payne (6)	Xfinity Mobile Arena; 19,746	39–33
73	March 25	Chicago	W 157–137	Joel Embiid (35)	Adem Bona (8)	Joel Embiid (7)	Xfinity Mobile Arena; 18,921	40–33
74	March 28	@ Charlotte	W 118–114	Joel Embiid (29)	Paul George (13)	Tyrese Maxey (8)	Spectrum Center; 19,616	41–33
75	March 30	@ Miami	L 109–119	Joel Embiid (26)	Kelly Oubre Jr. (11)	Tyrese Maxey (9)	Kaseya Center; 19,742	41–34

April: 4–3 (home: 2–1; road: 2–2)

Game	Date	Team	Score	High points	High rebounds	High assists	Location Attendance	Record
76	April 1	@ Washington	W 153–131	Paul George (39)	Andre Drummond (9)	V. J. Edgecombe (10)	Capital One Arena; 17,956	42–34
77	April 3	Minnesota	W 115–103	Paul George (23)	Joel Embiid (13)	Tyrese Maxey (8)	Xfinity Mobile Arena; 18,457	43–34
78	April 4	Detroit	L 93–116	Tyrese Maxey (23)	V. J. Edgecombe (6)	Paul George (4)	Xfinity Mobile Arena; 19,746	43–35
79	April 6	@ San Antonio	L 102–115	Joel Embiid (34)	Joel Embiid (12)	Tyrese Maxey (8)	Frost Bank Center; 18,354	43–36
80	April 9	@ Houston	L 102–113	Tyrese Maxey (23)	Andre Drummond (15)	V. J. Edgecombe (8)	Toyota Center; 18,055	43–37
81	April 10	@ Indiana	W 105–94	Tyrese Maxey (32)	Andre Drummond (16)	Edgecombe, Maxey (5)	Gainbridge Fieldhouse; 17,274	44–37
82	April 12	Milwaukee	W 126–106	Tyrese Maxey (21)	Andre Drummond (12)	V. J. Edgecombe (11)	Xfinity Mobile Arena; 19,746	45–37

2025–26 season schedule

=== Play-in ===
2026 play-in game log
Total: 1–0 (Home: 1–0; Road: 0–0)
Play-in: 1–0 (home: 1–0; road: 0–0)

Game	Date	Team	Score	High points	High rebounds	High assists	Location Attendance	Record
1	April 15	Orlando	W 109–97	Tyrese Maxey (31)	V. J. Edgecombe (11)	Tyrese Maxey (6)	Xfinity Mobile Arena; 19,746	1–0

2025–26 season schedule

=== Playoffs ===
2026 playoff game log
Total: 4–7 (home: 1–4; road: 3–3)
First Round: 4–3 (home: 1–2; road: 3–1)

Game	Date	Team	Score	High points	High rebounds	High assists	Location Attendance	Series
1	April 19	@ Boston	L 91–123	Tyrese Maxey (21)	Kelly Oubre Jr. (7)	Tyrese Maxey (8)	TD Garden; 19,156	0–1
2	April 21	@ Boston	W 111–97	V. J. Edgecombe (30)	V. J. Edgecombe (10)	Tyrese Maxey (9)	TD Garden; 19,156	1–1
3	April 24	Boston	L 100–108	Tyrese Maxey (31)	V. J. Edgecombe (10)	Tyrese Maxey (6)	Xfinity Mobile Arena; 19,746	1–2
4	April 26	Boston	L 96–128	Joel Embiid (26)	Joel Embiid (10)	Tied (6)	Xfinity Mobile Arena; 19,746	1–3
5	April 28	@ Boston	W 113–97	Joel Embiid (33)	Tyrese Maxey (10)	Joel Embiid (8)	TD Garden; 19,156	2–3
6	April 30	Boston	W 106–93	Tyrese Maxey (30)	Joel Embiid (10)	Joel Embiid (8)	Xfinity Mobile Arena; 19,746	3–3
7	May 2	@ Boston	W 109–100	Joel Embiid (34)	Joel Embiid (12)	Tyrese Maxey (7)	TD Garden; 19,156	4–3

Conference Semifinals: 0–4 (home: 0–2; road: 0–2)

Game	Date	Team	Score	High points	High rebounds	High assists	Location Attendance	Series
1	May 4	@ New York	L 98–137	Paul George (17)	Kelly Oubre Jr. (5)	Quentin Grimes (4)	Madison Square Garden; 19,812	0–1
2	May 6	@ New York	L 102–108	Tyrese Maxey (26)	Andre Drummond (8)	Tyrese Maxey (6)	Madison Square Garden; 19,812	0–2
3	May 8	New York	L 94–108	Kelly Oubre Jr. (22)	Kelly Oubre Jr. (8)	Tyrese Maxey (7)	Xfinity Mobile Arena; 19,746	0–3
4	May 10	New York	L 114–144	Joel Embiid (24)	V. J. Edgecombe (6)	V. J. Edgecombe (7)	Xfinity Mobile Arena; 19,746	0–4

2026 playoff schedule

=== NBA Cup ===
==== East Group B ====
Pos	Team	Pld	W	L	PF	PA	PD	Qualification
1	Orlando Magic	4	4	0	484	420	+64	Advanced to knockout rounds
2	Boston Celtics	4	2	2	441	458	−17	
3	Detroit Pistons	4	2	2	462	441	+21	
4	Philadelphia 76ers	4	1	3	431	470	−39	
5	Brooklyn Nets	4	1	3	421	450	−29	

Source: NBA

== Player statistics ==
Legend
GP	Games played	GS	Games started	MPG	Minutes per game
FG%	Field-goal percentage	3P%	3-point field-goal percentage	FT%	Free-throw percentage
RPG	Rebounds per game	APG	Assists per game	SPG	Steals per game
BPG	Blocks per game	PPG	Points per game

=== Regular season ===
Philadelphia 76ers statistics
Player	GP	GS	MPG	FG%	3P%	FT%	RPG	APG	SPG	BPG	PPG
Patrick Baldwin Jr.^{†}	1	0	2.0				1.0	.0	.0	.0	.0
Dominick Barlow	71	59	23.8	.539	.256	.718	4.8	1.2	.9	.7	7.7
Charles Bassey^{†}	1	0	5.0	1.000			.0	.0	.0	1.0	2.0
MarJon Beauchamp	14	1	14.0	.434	.340	.684	2.3	1.1	.6	.3	6.8
Adem Bona	71	18	17.4	.595	.333	.708	4.3	.5	.4	1.2	4.8
Johni Broome	11	0	5.0	.167	.000	.333	1.5	.4	.3	.2	.9
Andre Drummond	63	25	19.5	.472	.356	.631	8.4	1.3	.6	.8	6.4
V. J. Edgecombe	75	75	35.0	.438	.354	.818	5.6	4.2	1.4	.5	16.0
Justin Edwards	64	12	15.3	.447	.372	.846	1.5	1.3	.8	.2	6.0
Joel Embiid	38	38	31.6	.489	.333	.854	7.7	3.9	.6	1.2	26.9
Paul George	37	37	30.7	.439	.392	.820	5.3	3.6	1.7	.4	17.3
Eric Gordon	6	0	12.3	.571	.571	.500	.3	.5	.7	.2	5.5
Quentin Grimes	75	19	29.4	.450	.334	.840	3.6	3.3	.9	.4	13.4
Kyle Lowry	14	0	8.4	.160	.160	.833	.6	.8	.1	.1	1.2
Tyrese Martin^{†}	9	0	9.0	.409	.154	.000	1.1	1.0	.3	.2	2.2
Tyrese Maxey	70	70	38.0	.462	.367	.892	4.1	6.6	1.9	.8	28.3
Jared McCain^{†}	37	1	16.8	.385	.378	.880	2.0	1.7	.6	.1	6.6
Kelly Oubre Jr.	50	41	31.5	.467	.360	.766	5.0	1.6	1.4	.5	14.1
Cameron Payne	22	1	17.0	.376	.330	.864	2.0	2.6	1.1	.3	7.4
Hunter Sallis	7	0	3.7	.600		.500	.1	.6	.0	.1	1.0
Dalen Terry^{†}	14	0	12.4	.434	.250	.538	1.6	1.6	.5	.3	4.1
Jabari Walker	64	6	11.9	.455	.337	.735	3.0	.5	.4	.2	4.3
Trendon Watford	53	7	16.3	.515	.200	.779	3.3	2.5	.3	.4	6.5

=== Playoffs ===
Philadelphia 76ers statistics
Player	GP	GS	MPG	FG%	3P%	FT%	RPG	APG	SPG	BPG	PPG
Dominick Barlow	9	0	10.7	.588	.000	.857	1.7	.1	.2	.4	2.9
Adem Bona	10	3	9.6	.500		.625	2.1	.1	.1	.7	2.6
Johni Broome	2	0	4.0	.500	.250		1.0	.5	.0	.0	3.5
Andre Drummond	11	1	12.9	.696	.500	.700	4.3	.6	.4	.2	3.9
V. J. Edgecombe	11	11	37.0	.414	.292	.722	6.1	3.4	1.0	.4	14.0
Justin Edwards	9	0	12.1	.344	.222	.571	2.2	.4	.0	.1	3.3
Joel Embiid	7	7	33.3	.460	.179	.831	7.3	5.4	.3	.9	24.0
Paul George	11	11	35.8	.458	.493	.750	3.9	3.0	1.3	.5	16.4
Quentin Grimes	11	0	22.1	.397	.400	.875	2.7	2.3	.3	.5	6.7
Kyle Lowry	2	0	1.5				.5	.0	.0	.0	.0
Tyrese Maxey	11	11	39.7	.455	.351	.896	4.0	5.9	.8	.4	23.7
Kelly Oubre Jr.	11	11	33.1	.453	.256	.815	5.8	1.1	.5	.5	11.6
Dalen Terry	7	0	5.6	.308	.400	.429	.6	1.0	.7	.0	1.9
Jabari Walker	6	0	4.8	.100	.000	1.000	1.0	.0	.0	.0	.7
Trendon Watford	7	0	5.7	.636	.000	.750	.4	.4	.4	.0	2.9

- ^{†} Denotes player spent time with another team in the season. Stats reflect time with the 76ers only.

== Transactions ==
=== Trades ===
Date	Trade		Ref.
February 4	To Oklahoma City Thunder: (United States) Jared McCain	To Philadelphia 76ers: 2026 HOU first-round pick; 2027 second-round pick (Note: The most favorable of the picks originally belonging to Houston, Indiana, Miami, and Oklahoma City.); 2028 MIL second-round pick; 2028 OKC second-round pick	
February 5	To Memphis Grizzlies: (The Bahamas) Eric Gordon; 2032 second-round pick swap right	To Philadelphia 76ers: Draft rights to (United States) Justinian Jessup (2020 No. 51)	

=== Free agency ===
==== Re-signed ====
Date	Player	Ref.
July 1, 2025	(The Bahamas) Eric Gordon	
July 6, 2025	(United States) Justin Edwards	
July 7, 2025	(United States) Kyle Lowry	

==== Additions ====
Date	Player	Former Team	Ref.
July 1, 2025	(United States) Hunter Sallis	Wake Forest Demon Deacons (Sr.)	
July 2, 2025	(United States) Trendon Watford	Brooklyn Nets	
July 5, 2025	(United States) Jabari Walker	Portland Trail Blazers	
January 26, 2026	(Nigeria) Charles Bassey	Santa Cruz Warriors (NBA G League)	
February 5, 2026	(Nigeria) Charles Bassey	Philadelphia 76ers	

==== Subtractions ====
Player	Reason	New Team	Ref.
(France) Guerschon Yabusele	Free agency	New York Knicks	
