= Rich Edson =

American journalist (born 1981)

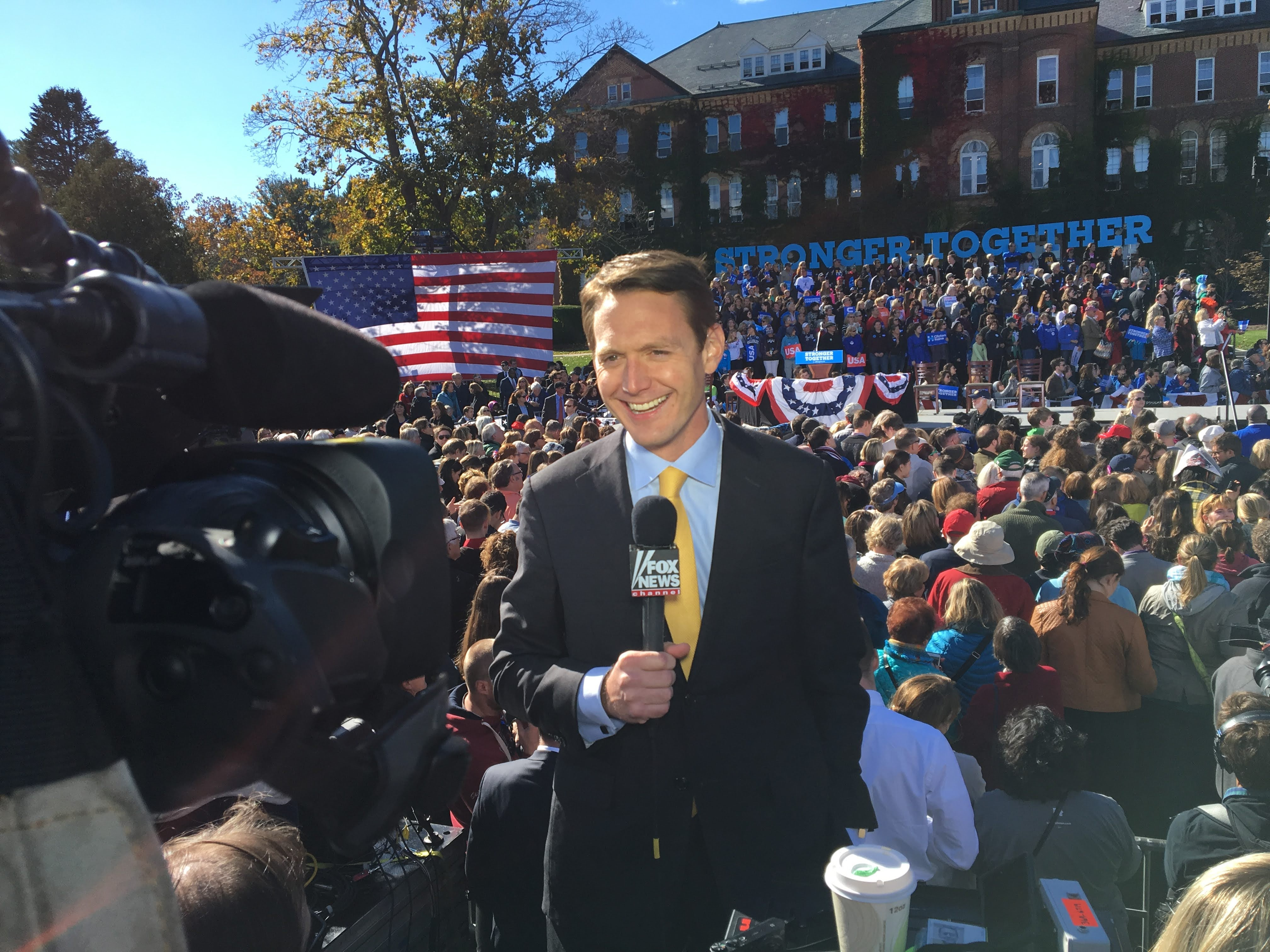
- Born: August 2, 1981 (age 44); Ridgewood, New Jersey, U.S.
- Education: Rutgers University (BA); Columbia University Graduate School of Journalism (MS)
- Occupation: Journalist
- Employers: Fox Business Network (2007–2015); Fox News (2015–present)

Rich Edson (born August 2, 1981, in Ridgewood, New Jersey) is the State Department Correspondent for Fox News Channel and a former Washington Correspondent for Fox Business Network.

He holds a Master of Science in journalism from Columbia University Graduate School of Journalism in New York, New York and a dual degree in history and journalism from Rutgers College of Rutgers University in New Brunswick, New Jersey. During his college years, Edson announced Rutgers sports on WRSU-FM and interned for Saturday Night Live. Edson grew up in Dumont, New Jersey and attended Dumont High School, where he met his future wife as a member of the marching band.
