= Dumont, New Jersey =

Borough in Bergen County, New Jersey, US

- Borough
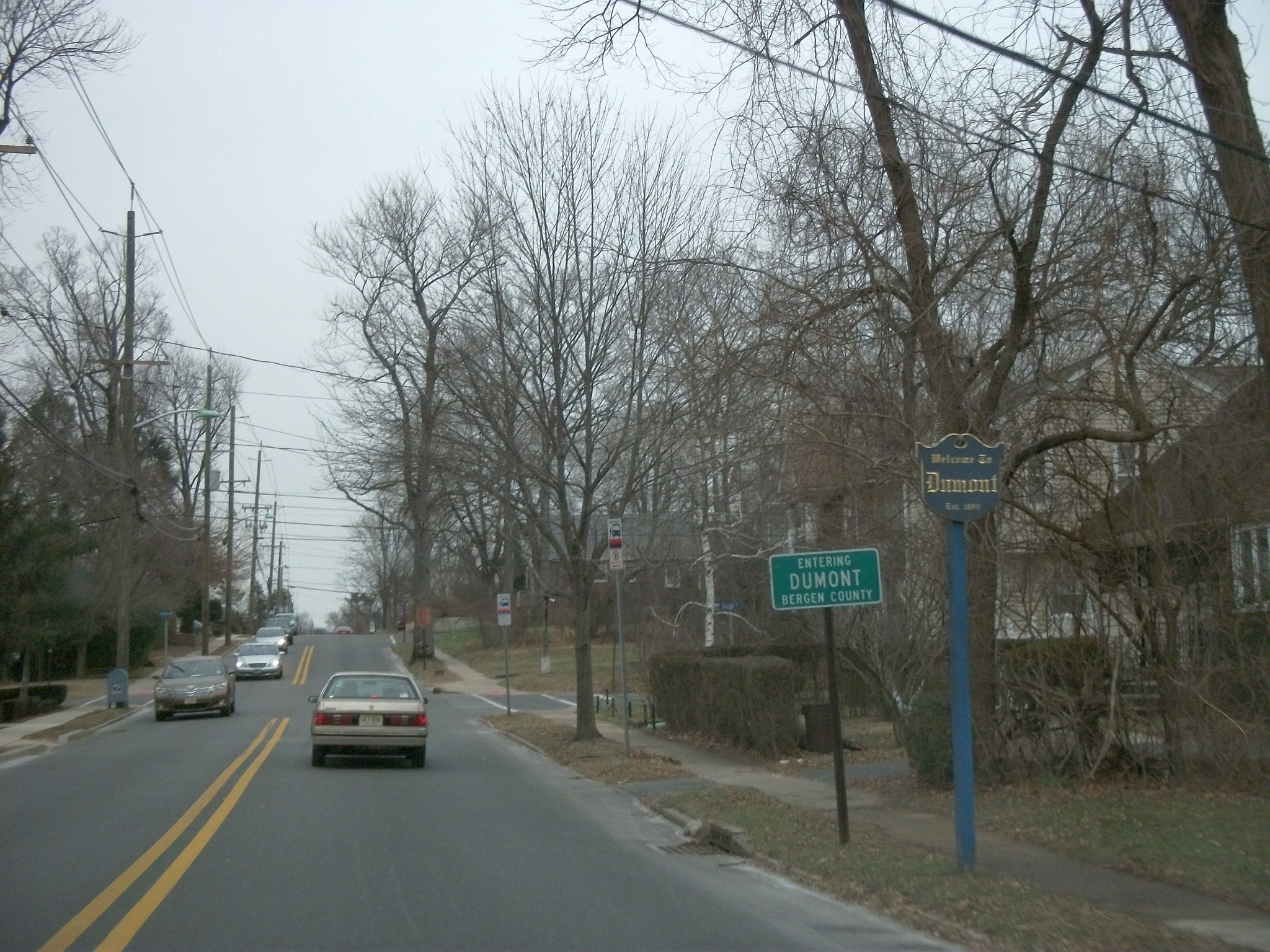
- Entering Dumont

- Seal

- Location of Dumont in Bergen County highlighted in red (left). Inset map: Location of Bergen County in New Jersey highlighted in orange (right).

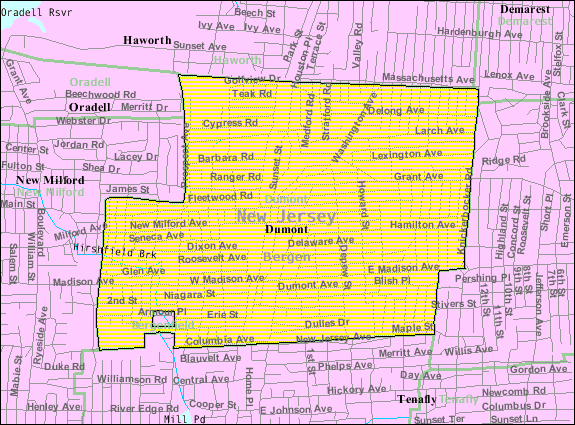
- Census Bureau map of Dumont, New Jersey

- Location in Bergen County Location in New Jersey Location in the United States
- Coordinates: 40°56′38″N 73°59′52″W
- Country: United States
- State: New Jersey
- County: Bergen
- Incorporated: July 20, 1891
- Named after: Dumont Clarke

Government
  - Type: Borough
  - Body: Borough Council
  - Mayor: John W. Russell III (R, term ends December 31, 2027)
  - Administrator: Jeanine E. Siek
  - Municipal clerk: Jeanine E. Siek

Area
  - Total: 1.95 sq mi (5.06 km^{2})
  - Land: 1.95 sq mi (5.05 km^{2})
  - Water: 0.0039 sq mi (0.01 km^{2}) 0.15%
  - Rank: 415th of 565 in state 50th of 70 in county
- Elevation: 102 ft (31 m)

Population (2020)
  - Total: 17,863
  - Estimate (2023): 18,234
  - Rank: 146th of 566 in state 17th of 70 in county
  - Density: 9,165.2/sq mi (3,538.7/km^{2})
  - Rank: 41st of 566 in state 12th of 70 in county
- Time zone: UTC−05:00 (Eastern (EST))
  - Summer (DST): UTC−04:00 (Eastern (EDT))
- ZIP Code: 07628
- Area code: 201
- FIPS code: 3400318400
- GNIS feature ID: 0885197
- Website: www.dumontnj.gov

Dumont is a borough in Bergen County, in the U.S. state of New Jersey. As of the 2020 United States census, the borough's population was 17,863, an increase of 384 (+2.2%) from the 2010 census count of 17,479, which in turn reflected a decrease of 24 (−0.1%) from the 17,503 counted in the 2000 census.

The borough was originally formed on July 20, 1891, as the Borough of Schraalenburgh from portions of Harrington Township and Palisades Township, based on the results of a referendum held the previous day. The borough was formed during the "Boroughitis" phenomenon then sweeping through Bergen County, in which 26 boroughs were formed in the county in 1894 alone. On March 7, 1898, portions of the borough were annexed to Palisades Township. On June 13, 1898, the borough's name was changed to Dumont in honor of Dumont Clarke, the borough's first mayor.

== Geography ==
According to the United States Census Bureau, the borough had a total area of 1.95 square miles (5.06 km^{2}), including 1.95 square miles (5.05 km^{2}) of land and <0.01 square miles (0.01 km^{2}) of water (0.15%).

Municipalities bordering the borough include the Bergen County communities of Bergenfield, Cresskill, Demarest, Haworth, New Milford and Oradell.

== Demographics ==
Historical population
Census	Pop.	Note	%±
1900	643		—
1910	1,783		177.3%
1920	2,537		42.3%
1930	5,861		131.0%
1940	7,556		28.9%
1950	13,013		72.2%
1960	18,882		45.1%
1970	20,155		6.7%
1980	18,334		−9.0%
1990	17,187		−6.3%
2000	17,503		1.8%
2010	17,479		−0.1%
2020	17,863		2.2%
2023 (est.)	18,234	▲	2.1%
Population sources: 1900–1920 1900–1910; 1910–1930 1900–2020; 2000 2010 2020

=== Racial and ethnic composition ===
Dumont borough, Bergen County, New Jersey – Racial and ethnic composition Note: the US Census treats Hispanic/Latino as an ethnic category. This table excludes Latinos from the racial categories and assigns them to a separate category. Hispanics/Latinos may be of any race.
Race / Ethnicity (NH = Non-Hispanic)	Pop 2000	Pop 2010	Pop 2020	% 2000	% 2010	% 2020
White alone (NH)	13,692	11,641	9,847	78.23%	66.60%	55.13%
Black or African American alone (NH)	222	375	503	1.27%	2.15%	2.82%
Native American or Alaska Native alone (NH)	13	17	12	0.07%	0.10%	0.07%
Asian alone (NH)	1,915	2,599	3,081	10.94%	14.87%	17.25%
Native Hawaiian or Pacific Islander alone (NH)	1	3	2	0.01%	0.02%	0.01%
Other race alone (NH)	9	24	93	0.05%	0.14%	0.52%
Mixed race or Multiracial (NH)	188	240	442	1.07%	1.37%	2.47%
Hispanic or Latino (any race)	1,463	2,580	3,883	8.36%	14.76%	21.74%
Total	17,503	17,479	17,863	100.00%	100.00%	100.00%

=== 2020 census ===
As of the 2020 census, Dumont had a population of 17,863. The median age was 42.6 years. 20.2% of residents were under the age of 18 and 17.5% were 65 years of age or older. For every 100 females there were 92.3 males, and for every 100 females age 18 and over there were 89.8 males.

100.0% of residents lived in urban areas, while 0.0% lived in rural areas.

There were 6,408 households in Dumont, of which 33.5% had children under the age of 18 living in them. Of all households, 57.4% were married-couple households, 13.7% were households with a male householder and no spouse or partner present, and 24.6% were households with a female householder and no spouse or partner present. About 22.3% of all households were made up of individuals and 12.1% had someone living alone who was 65 years of age or older.

There were 6,572 housing units, of which 2.5% were vacant. The homeowner vacancy rate was 0.7% and the rental vacancy rate was 2.8%.

=== 2010 census ===
The 2010 United States census counted 17,479 people, 6,364 households, and 4,678 families in the borough. The population density was 8,814.7 per square mile (3,403.4/km^{2}). There were 6,542 housing units at an average density of 3,299.2 per square mile (1,273.8/km^{2}). The racial makeup was 75.91% (13,268) White, 2.55% (445) Black or African American, 0.18% (32) Native American, 14.99% (2,620) Asian, 0.02% (3) Pacific Islander, 4.06% (709) from other races, and 2.30% (402) from two or more races. Hispanic or Latino of any race were 14.76% (2,580) of the population.

Of the 6,364 households, 33.2% had children under the age of 18; 58.2% were married couples living together; 11.2% had a female householder with no husband present and 26.5% were non-families. Of all households, 23.4% were made up of individuals and 11.5% had someone living alone who was 65 years of age or older. The average household size was 2.75 and the average family size was 3.27.

22.5% of the population were under the age of 18, 7.7% from 18 to 24, 25.0% from 25 to 44, 29.4% from 45 to 64, and 15.5% who were 65 years of age or older. The median age was 41.8 years. For every 100 females, the population had 92.5 males. For every 100 females ages 18 and older there were 90.1 males.

The Census Bureau's 2006–2010 American Community Survey showed that (in 2010 inflation-adjusted dollars) median household income was $82,286 (with a margin of error of +/− $5,515) and the median family income was $93,125 (+/− $6,828). Males had a median income of $62,065 (+/− $8,065) versus $45,965 (+/− $4,364) for females. The per capita income for the borough was $33,518 (+/− $1,909). About 2.5% of families and 3.2% of the population were below the poverty line, including 2.2% of those under age 18 and 8.4% of those age 65 or over.

Same-sex couples headed 25 households in 2010, an increase from the 20 counted in 2000.

=== 2000 census ===
As of the 2000 United States census there were 17,503 people, 6,370 households, and 4,758 families residing in the borough. The population density was 8,812.6 inhabitants per square mile (3,402.6/km^{2}). There were 6,465 housing units at an average density of 3,255.1 per square mile (1,256.8/km^{2}). The racial makeup of the borough was 83.77% White, 1.49% African American, 0.10% Native American, 10.96% Asian, 0.01% Pacific Islander, 1.94% from other races, and 1.74% from two or more races. Hispanic or Latino of any race were 8.36% of the population.

There were 6,370 households, out of which 34.7% had children under the age of 18 living with them, 61.8% were married couples living together, 9.5% had a female householder with no husband present, and 25.3% were non-families. 22.3% of all households were made up of individuals, and 11.8% had someone living alone who was 65 years of age or older. The average household size was 2.75 and the average family size was 3.24.

In the borough the population was spread out, with 24.4% under the age of 18, 6.1% from 18 to 24, 31.3% from 25 to 44, 22.8% from 45 to 64, and 15.4% who were 65 years of age or older. The median age was 38 years. For every 100 females, there were 92.6 males. For every 100 females age 18 and over, there were 88.2 males.

The median income for a household in the borough was $65,490, and the median income for a family was $73,880. Males had a median income of $47,402 versus $35,331 for females. The per capita income for the borough was $26,489. About 2.0% of families and 2.6% of the population were below the poverty line, including 3.5% of those under age 18 and 1.7% of those age 65 or over.

== Parks and recreation ==
Dumont has four major parks in the borough. Memorial Park is located on the east side of Dumont. It is made up of five ballparks, one tennis court, a basketball court, and a pavilion. The park is used throughout the year mostly for Little League and Dumont High School Baseball. During the summer Memorial Park is used for the Dumont Summer Recreation Program. Another park in Dumont is Twin Boro Field, located on the opposite side of the borough. Twin Boro is a huge field that is used for recreational football and soccer. There is also a softball field that is used for the Dumont Men's Softball League. Right next to Twin Boro is Gina's Field which consists of two girls' softball fields and a playground. To the right of Twin Boro Field is the Dumont Swim Club. The Swim Club's parking lot doubles as a roller hockey rink for Dumont's Hockey League and also applies for free ice cream. Memorial Park and Twin Boro Fields are two of the largest parks in Dumont. Near the center of the town is Fred Triplett Park, it has a playground and is dedicated to Frederick Triplett, a soldier killed in 1944 during World War II. Across the street is the fourth major park, Dawn M. Totten Memorial Field, which has a small playground and a softball field used by Dumont Girls Softball.

Dumont recreational sports programs include Dumont Little League, Dumont Girls Softball, Dumont Football, Dumont Soccer, Dumont Basketball, Dumont Roller Hockey, and the Dumont Swim Team.

Some annual events conducted in the borough include Dumont Day, held in early September, Octoberfest, held in early October, The Dumont Winter Festival, held in December and an annual Memorial Day Parade and celebration held in May.

== Government ==
=== Local government ===
Dumont is governed under the borough form of New Jersey municipal government, which is used in 218 (of the 564) municipalities statewide, making it the most common form of government in New Jersey. The governing body is comprised of a mayor and a borough council, with all positions elected at-large on a partisan basis as part of the November general election. A mayor is elected directly by the voters to a four-year term of office. The borough council includes six members elected to serve three-year terms on a staggered basis, with two seats coming up for election each year in a three-year cycle. The borough form of government used by Dumont is a "weak mayor / strong council" government in which council members act as the legislative body with the mayor presiding at meetings and voting only in the event of a tie. The mayor can veto ordinances subject to an override by a two-thirds majority vote of the council. The mayor makes committee and liaison assignments for council members, and most appointments are made by the mayor with the advice and consent of the council.

As of 2026, the mayor of the Borough of Dumont is Republican John W. Russell III, whose term of office ends December 31, 2027. Members of the Dumont Borough Council are Council President Tom Kelly (R, 2027), Doreen Aponte (R, 2028), Kenneth Armellino (R, 2026; elected to an unexpired term), Gidget Petry (R, 2027), Lisa Rossillo (D, 2028) and Louis Sciarrino (R, 2026; appointed to serve an unexpired term).

=== Emergency services ===
The Dumont Police Department, comprised of 36 officers and 8 dispatchers, operates out of the Borough Hall and protects and serves the community around the clock. The police department also includes volunteer reserve officers. The department's Chief of Police is Luke Totten.

The fire department is staffed by approximately 80 volunteer firefighters located at four different fire houses throughout the borough. The Dumont Fire Department responds to between 400 & 500 calls per year, including mutual aid to neighboring municipalities including Tenafly, Bergenfield, Cresskill, New Milford, Oradell, River Edge, and the Northern Valley towns when needed. The Dumont Fire Department is equipped with eight pieces of apparatus (four engines, one ladder, one rescue, one squad, and a utility truck) at the following locations:

- Company 1, which is located on Madison Avenue, houses Squad 1 and Engine 1
- Company 2, which is located on Prospect Avenue, houses Truck 2 and Squad 2
- Company 3, which is located on Rucereto Avenue, houses Engine 3 and Rescue 3
- Independent Hose Company, which is located on Veterans Plaza, houses Engine 4 and Engine 5

The Dumont Volunteer Ambulance Corps, established in 1937, is located at 108 Brook Street. The corps has approximately 40 active members and approximately 10 more auxiliary and reserve members. Dumont VAC renders aid with two Type III ambulances; Units 28 and 29, as well as two support vehicles unit 281 (Ford Explorer) and 291 (Dodge Durango). DVAC responds to roughly 1,400 requests for aid per year.

=== Federal, state and county representation ===
Dumont is located in the 5th Congressional District and is part of New Jersey's 39th state legislative district.

For the 119th United States Congress, New Jersey's 5th congressional district is represented by Josh Gottheimer (D, Wyckoff). New Jersey is represented in the United States Senate by Democrats Cory Booker (Newark, term ends 2027) and Andy Kim (Moorestown, term ends 2031).

For the 2026–2027 session, the 39th legislative district of the New Jersey Legislature is represented in the State Senate by Holly Schepisi (R, River Vale) and in the General Assembly by Robert Auth (R, Old Tappan) and John V. Azzariti (R, Saddle River).

Bergen County is governed by a directly elected County Executive, with legislative functions performed by a Board of County Commissioners comprised of seven members who are elected at-large to three-year terms in partisan elections on a staggered basis, with either two or three seats coming up for election each November; a Chairman and Vice Chairman are selected from among its seven members at a reorganization meeting held every January. As of 2025, the county executive is James J. Tedesco III (D, Paramus), whose four-year term of office ends December 31, 2026.

Bergen County's Commissioners are Chair Mary J. Amoroso (D, Mahwah, 2025), Vice Chair Steven A. Tanelli (D, North Arlington, 2027), Chair Pro Tem Joan Voss (D, Fort Lee, 2026), Rafael Marte (D, Bergenfield, 2026), Germaine M. Ortiz (D, Emerson, 2025), Thomas J. Sullivan Jr. (D, Montvale, 2025) and Tracy Silna Zur (D, Franklin Lakes, 2027).

Bergen County's elected constitutional officials are Clerk John S. Hogan (D, Northvale, 2026), Sheriff Anthony Cureton (D, Englewood, 2027) and Surrogate Michael R. Dressler (D, Cresskill, 2026).

=== Politics ===
As of March 2011, there were a total of 10,526 registered voters in Dumont, of which 2,997 (28.5% vs. 31.7% countywide) were registered as Democrats, 1,862 (17.7% vs. 21.1%) were registered as Republicans and 5,659 (53.8% vs. 47.1%) were registered as Unaffiliated. There were 8 voters registered as Libertarians or Greens. Among the borough's 2010 Census population, 60.2% (vs. 57.1% in Bergen County) were registered to vote, including 77.7% of those ages 18 and over (vs. 73.7% countywide).

Gubernatorial election results for Dumont
Year	Republican		Democratic		Third party(ies)	
Year	No.	%	No.	%	No.	%
2025	2,941	42.01%	4,010	57.29%	49	0.70%
2021	2,600	47.18%	2,881	52.28%	30	0.54%
2017	1,906	43.22%	2,422	54.92%	82	1.86%
2013	2,857	60.98%	1,771	37.80%	57	1.22%
2009	2,518	48.38%	2,343	45.01%	344	6.61%
2005	2,382	42.78%	3,066	55.06%	120	2.16%

In the 2016 presidential election, Democrat Hillary Clinton received 4,423 votes (50.3% vs. 54.2% countywide), ahead of Republican Donald Trump with 3,928 votes (44.7% vs. 41.1% countywide) and other candidates with 298 votes (3.4% vs. 3.0% countywide), among the 8,787 ballots cast by the borough's 11,712 registered voters for a turnout of 75% (vs. 73% in Bergen County). In the 2012 presidential election, Democrat Barack Obama received 4,407 votes (54.7% vs. 54.8% countywide), ahead of Republican Mitt Romney with 3,465 votes (43.0% vs. 43.5%) and other candidates with 112 votes (1.4% vs. 0.9%), among the 8,050 ballots cast by the borough's 11,108 registered voters, for a turnout of 72.5% (vs. 70.4% in Bergen County). In the 2008 presidential election, Democrat Barack Obama received 4,497 votes (52.3% vs. 53.9% countywide), ahead of Republican John McCain with 3,948 votes (46.0% vs. 44.5%) and other candidates with 72 votes (0.8% vs. 0.8%), among the 8,591 ballots cast by the borough's 10,871 registered voters, for a turnout of 79.0% (vs. 76.8% in Bergen County). In the 2004 presidential election, Democrat John Kerry received 4,122 votes (49.7% vs. 51.7% countywide), ahead of Republican George W. Bush with 4,077 votes (49.2% vs. 47.2%) and other candidates with 58 votes (0.7% vs. 0.7%), among the 8,286 ballots cast by the borough's 10,345 registered voters, for a turnout of 80.1% (vs. 76.9% in the whole county).

Presidential elections results
Year	Republican	Democratic
2024	47.3% 4,375	50.0% 4,628
2020	42.8% 4,323	55.7% 5,633
2016	44.7% 3,928	50.3% 4,423
2012	43.0% 3,465	54.7% 4,407
2008	46.0% 3,948	52.3% 4,497
2004	49.2% 4,077	49.7% 4,122

In the 2013 gubernatorial election, Republican Chris Christie received 61.0% of the vote (2,857 cast), ahead of Democrat Barbara Buono with 37.8% (1,771 votes), and other candidates with 1.2% (57 votes), among the 4,766 ballots cast by the borough's 10,745 registered voters (81 ballots were spoiled), for a turnout of 44.4%. In the 2009 gubernatorial election, Republican Chris Christie received 2,518 votes (47.9% vs. 45.8% countywide), ahead of Democrat Jon Corzine with 2,343 votes (44.6% vs. 48.0%), Independent Chris Daggett with 320 votes (6.1% vs. 4.7%) and other candidates with 24 votes (0.5% vs. 0.5%), among the 5,256 ballots cast by the borough's 10,589 registered voters, yielding a 49.6% turnout (vs. 50.0% in the county).

United States Senate election results for Dumont1
Year	Republican		Democratic		Third party(ies)	
Year	No.	%	No.	%	No.	%
2024	3,995	45.33%	4,618	52.40%	200	2.27%
2018	2,803	45.55%	3,129	50.84%	222	3.61%
2012	3,049	41.60%	4,178	57.00%	103	1.41%
2006	2,484	47.05%	2,719	51.51%	76	1.44%

United States Senate election results for Dumont2
Year	Republican		Democratic		Third party(ies)	
Year	No.	%	No.	%	No.	%
2020	4,009	40.81%	5,629	57.30%	186	1.89%
2014	1,931	44.27%	2,361	54.13%	70	1.60%
2013	1,322	48.82%	1,358	50.15%	28	1.03%
2008	3,306	43.12%	4,266	55.64%	95	1.24%

== Education ==
The Dumont Public Schools serve students in pre-kindergarten through twelfth grade. As of the 2020–21 school year, the district, comprised of five schools, had an enrollment of 2,540 students and 208.0 classroom teachers (on an FTE basis), for a student–teacher ratio of 12.2:1. Schools in the district (with 2020–21 enrollment data from the National Center for Education Statistics) are Grant School with 390 students in grades K-5 (opened 1911), Honiss School with 632 students in grades K-8 (opened 1955), Lincoln School with 156 students in grades K-5 (opened 1911), Selzer School with 500 students in grades PreK-8 (opened 1960) and Dumont High School with 788 students in grades 9-12 (opened 1932).

Public school students from the borough, and all of Bergen County, are eligible to attend the secondary education programs offered by the Bergen County Technical Schools, which include the Bergen County Academies in Hackensack, and the Bergen Tech campus in Teterboro or Paramus. The district offers programs on a shared-time or full-time basis, with admission based on a selective application process and tuition covered by the student's home school district.

Newbury Academy is a private alternative high school for students in grades 9–12 that was founded in Teaneck in 2001 and moved to Dumont in 2003. As of September 2008, Newbury Academy has become a virtual school with all classes being conducted online, with teachers making weekly visits to students' homes.

== Transportation ==
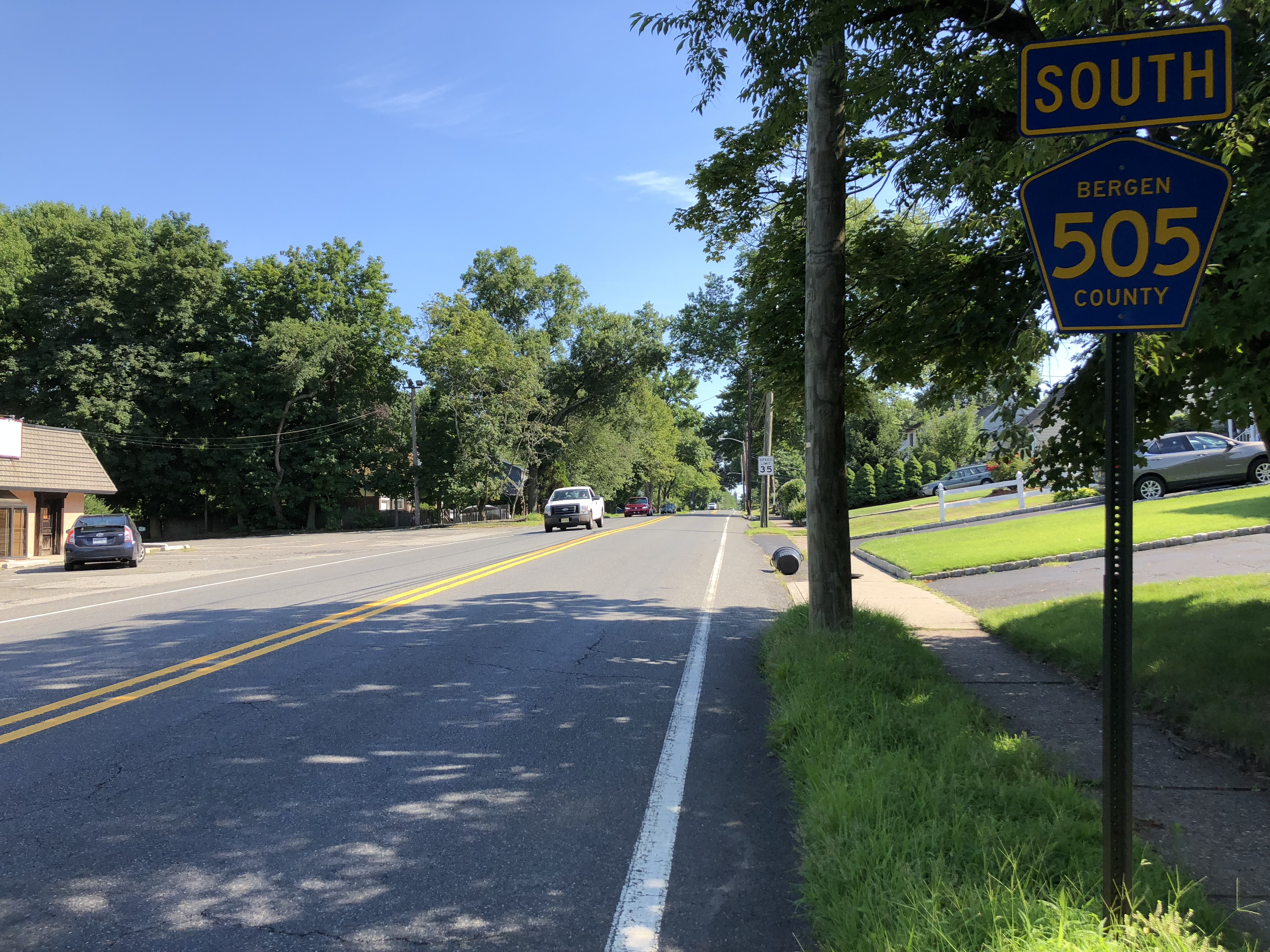
County Route 505 southbound on the east side of Dumont

=== Roads and highways ===
As of May 2010, the borough had a total of 47.96 miles (77.18 km) of roadways, of which 43.38 miles (69.81 km) were maintained by the municipality and 4.58 miles (7.37 km) by Bergen County.

The most significant road directly serving Dumont is County Route 505, which follows Knickerbocker Road along the east border of the borough. Other main roads in Dumont include Madison Avenue and Washington Avenue.

=== Public transportation ===
The NJ Transit 166 and 167 bus routes provides service between the borough and the Port Authority Bus Terminal in Midtown Manhattan; the 186 serves the George Washington Bridge Bus Terminal; and local service is available on the 753 and 772 routes.

The former Dumont station was part of the West Shore Railroad main line which was served by the New York Central Railroad until the line was dropped and commuter serve ended in 1959. The station has been defunct, as the tracks are now used by CSX freight trains.

== Notable people ==
People who were born in, residents of, or otherwise closely associated with Dumont include:

- Harvey A. Allen (1818–1882), United States Army officer, Commander of the Department of Alaska 1871–1873
- Joe Azelby (born 1962), professional football player who played for the Buffalo Bills, businessman and author
- Dominick Barlow (born 2003), professional basketball player for the Philadelphia 76ers of the NBA, on a two-way contract with the Delaware Blue Coats of the NBA G League
- John Battaglia (1955–2018), convicted murderer who was executed by the state of Texas for killing his two daughters in 2001 in an act of revenge against his estranged wife
- Graham Clarke (born 1970), children's entertainer and recording artist
- Rich Edson (born 1981), Fox News Channel reporter
- Joe Ferriero (born 1957), former Bergen County Democratic Party boss who had been elected to the Dumont Borough Council as a 20-year-old in 1977
- Olivia Goldsmith (born Randy Goldfield, 1949–2004), author of the novel The First Wives Club
- Michale Graves (born 1975), former singer of The Misfits
- John "Beatz" Holohan (born 1974), drummer for the band Bayside
- Tim Jeffs (born 1965), former guitar player of the band White Zombie
- Richard Kuklinski (1935–2006), Criminal who was convicted of killing 5 people
- Sean Lissemore (born 1987), defensive end for the San Diego Chargers
- Kevin McMullan (born 1968), baseball coach, who is assistant baseball coach for the Mississippi State Bulldogs
- Stuart Meissner (born 1962), attorney
- Eddie Miller (1895–1965), race car driver who finished fourth at the 1921 Indianapolis 500
- Samantha Monahan (born 1988), professional soccer player who plays for Ballerup-Skovlunde Fodbold of the Danish Elitedivisionen
- Thomas Nozkowski (1944–2019), contemporary painter
- Jerry Palmieri (born 1958), football strength and conditioning coach, most recently on Tom Coughlin's staff for the New York Giants
- Bob Papa (born 1964), play-by-play voice for the New York Giants
- Bob Price (born 1955), former head coach of the Montreal Alouettes and tight end coach and recruiting coordinator for the Virginia Cavaliers
- Geoff Rickly (born 1979), lead singer of the band Thursday
- Larry Rosen (1940–2015), entrepreneur, musician and recording engineer best known for his work as a modern jazz producer and label owner
- Jacob Westervelt (1794–1881), served as New York City Sheriff from 1831 to 1834
- John T. Wright (c. 1926–1976), politician who became the first African-American councilmember in Bergen County, when he was elected in 1952 to serve on the Englewood city council

== Sources ==
- Municipal Incorporations of the State of New Jersey (according to Counties) prepared by the Division of Local Government, Department of the Treasury (New Jersey); December 1, 1958.
- Clayton, W. Woodford; and Nelson, William. History of Bergen and Passaic Counties, New Jersey, with Biographical Sketches of Many of its Pioneers and Prominent Men., Philadelphia: Everts and Peck, 1882.
- Harvey, Cornelius Burnham (ed.), Genealogical History of Hudson and Bergen Counties, New Jersey. New York: New Jersey Genealogical Publishing Co., 1900.
- Van Valen, James M. History of Bergen County, New Jersey. New York: New Jersey Publishing and Engraving Co., 1900.
- Westervelt, Frances A. (Frances Augusta), 1858–1942, History of Bergen County, New Jersey, 1630–1923, Lewis Historical Publishing Company, 1923.
