= Stuart Meissner =

American attorney (born 1962)

- Political party: Republican

Stuart Meissner (born 1962) is an American attorney. His firm, Meissner Associates, opened in 2001, with offices in Manhattan, New York, and across the country, focused on the securities industry, investment disputes, FINRA attorney, and SEC whistleblower matters.

Meissner, born in 1962 in Brooklyn, and raised in Lawrence, Nassau County, New York, graduated with bachelor's and J.D. degrees from Hofstra University, and received a master of laws degree in corporate law from the New York University School of Law. He is a son of George Meissner of West Palm Beach, Florida.

Following the 9/11 terrorist attacks, Meissner volunteered at Ground Zero on "the pile" on the "bucket brigade", along with fire and policemen sifting through debris trying to find survivors. As a result of his volunteer work after 9/11 in 2016, Meissner learned he had developed a rare cancer, which required major surgery and intensive chemotherapy, all the while continuing to support his children and oversee his law practice, but eventually survived his cancer diagnosis.

Meissner was one of the first Attorneys to file a SEC Whistleblower Tip, and participated in the drafting of the SEC Rules regarding such program when it was passed into law. His comments appear in the footnotes of the actual rules. Meissner represents clients as SEC whistleblowers. Meissner Also represents defrauded investors and Wall Street employees against large financial institutions including Morgan Stanley, UBS, Wells Fargo, and Citizens Securities, and has won millions in awards and settlements on behalf of defrauded investors and employees in the industry.

In 2016, his client was awarded over $22 million from the SEC as a result of the Dodd Frank SEC Whistleblower program, which was the largest accounting fraud award ever given to in the history of the program, involving Monsanto Corporation. Dodd-Frank whistleblower awards, which allow whistleblowers to collect up to 30% of what the SEC recovers in fines and reimbursements, have formed the primary focus of Meissner's work in addition to pursuing investor and employment FINRA arbitrations against major Wall Street institutions.

A resident of Dumont, New Jersey, Meissner is a former state prosecutor and was a first time independent candidate for U.S. Senate from the US state of New Jersey in 2013. Meissner pulled in a minority of votes in 2013 NJ special election for US Senate, falling behind 2, but ahead of 3, other independent candidates.

In September 2019 Meissner announced a run for the GOP nomination in New Jersey to challenge Democratic U.S. Senator Cory Booker in the 2020 U.S. Senate elections. In February 2020 Meissner withdrew his candidacy.
