= Dumont High School =

High school in Bergen County, New Jersey, US

Location
- 101 New Milford Avenue; Dumont, Bergen County, New Jersey 07628; United States; 40.944418°N 73.996689°W

Information
- Type: Public comprehensive High school
- Established: 1918
- School district: Dumont Public Schools
- NCES School ID: 340399000340
- Principal: Andrew Garcia
- Faculty: 65.1 FTEs
- Grades: 9–12
- Enrollment: 704 (as of 2024–25)
- Student to teacher ratio: 10.8:1
- Colors: Brown; Orange; White
- Athletics conference: Big North Conference (general); North Jersey Super Football Conference (football)
- Team name: Huskies
- Rival: Tenafly High School
- Newspaper: Periscope
- Yearbook: Reveries
- Website: dhs.dumontnj.org

Dumont High School is a four-year comprehensive public high school that serves students in ninth through twelfth grade from Dumont, in Bergen County, in the U.S. state of New Jersey, originally founded in 1918.

As of the 2024–25 school year, the high school had an enrollment of 704 students and 65.1 classroom teachers (on an FTE basis), for a student–teacher ratio of 10.8:1.

Operated as the lone secondary school of the Dumont Public Schools, the school is under the authority of the New Jersey Department of Education and has been accredited by the Middle States Association of Colleges and Schools Commission on Elementary and Secondary Schools since 1939.

== History ==
The original high school was founded in 1918 and was repurposed as the Dumont Municipal Building after a new high school was constructed; it was used until 2019 when it was demolished for a new municipal building. In 1927, the district proposed a new building that would accommodate 800 students in grades 7–12 and would cost $555,000 (equivalent to $14.9 million in 2025). The current Dumont High School was completed in 1928, with expansion projects undertaken in 1955 and 1961. In 1961, construction on the current building yielded a new gymnasium, a library, over 20 classrooms, and a cafeteria. Another addition was added to the school in 2007, which included a new media center and modern science labs.

== Sport and extracurricular activities ==
The Dumont High School Huskies compete in the Big North Conference, which is comprised of public and private high schools in Bergen and Passaic counties, and was established following a reorganization of sports leagues in Northern New Jersey by the New Jersey State Interscholastic Athletic Association (NJSIAA). Before the NJSIAA realignment, the school had been part of the Bergen County Scholastic League (BCSL) American Conference, which included public and private high schools in Bergen County and Hudson counties. With 611 students in grades 10–12, the school was classified by the NJSIAA for the 2019–20 school year as Group II for most sports competition purposes, which included schools with an enrollment of 486 to 758 students in that grade range.

Prior to the 2008–09 school year, the district completed renovations of the majority of DHS athletic facilities. The project included the installation of a state-of-the-art six-lane track, artificial FieldTurf playing surface and lights at the high school. In addition, a new baseball and soccer field were installed at Honiss School, while a new softball and soccer field were installed at Selzer School.

=== Football ===
The football team competes in the American Red division of the North Jersey Super Football Conference, which includes 112 schools competing in 20 divisions, making it the nation's biggest football-only high school sports league. The school was classified by the NJSIAA as Group II North for football for 2024–2026, which included schools with 484 to 683 students.

In 1984, the football team finished the season with a 9–2 record after winning its first ever North I, Section II state sectional title, defeating by a score of 23–20 a Hawthorne High School team that had come into the championship game undefeated.

In the annual "Turkey Bowl" game, played on Thanksgiving Day in 2025, Dumont beat Tenafly High School by a score of 28-20 to win its 11th consecutive game in the series. The game between the two teams, played 95 times, is the oldest and most-played high school football rivalry in Bergen County, with Tenafly leading the all-time series against Dumont 56–36–3. The 2026 Thanksgiving Day game between the two teams, played between the two schools since 1922, will be one of two played in North Jersey (the other being Hackensack vs. Teaneck), marking the decline of what had been a more widespread tradition.

=== Athletics ===
The boys cross country team won the Group III state championship in 1971.

The 1988 girls track team won the Bergen County relays for groups 1 and 2.

The 1999 boys indoor track team won the Bergen County Indoor Relays championship.

=== Baseball ===
The baseball team won the 2002 North I, Group II state sectional championship, defeating Hoboken High School 4–3 in the tournament final. In 2008, the team won the BCSL American League Championship for the first time since 1988, defeating rival River Dell High School by a score of 5–4 in nine innings. John O'Rourke allowed no earned runs over eight scoreless innings (8 IP, 4 R, 0 ER, 8 H, 6 K, BB). They finished the year at an overall record of 17–6, losing in the opening round of the North I, Group II State Tournament to Mahwah, 8–3.

The 2009-10 Dumont boys baseball team, under the direction of head coach Jason Cannici, finished with an overall of record of 20-7 and finished first in the BCSL American at a record of 15–3. They advanced to the semifinals of the North 1, Group 2 State Tournament losing 1–0 to North Warren Regional High School, with the only run of the game scoring on a suicide squeeze.

In 2010, the Dumont Huskies captured their third straight BSCL American Championship title by defeating Tenafly High School, 8–1.

=== Soccer ===
In fall 1998, the boys soccer team won the school's first ever Bergen County Tournament soccer game, beating Hackensack High School in penalty kicks, before losing to Bergen Catholic High School in the quarter-finals. The team was named the Small School (Group 1 & 2) Team of the Year by The Bergen Record, finishing the year 18–3–2, setting the school record for wins in a season.

=== Other sports ===
The school participates in joint boys / girls swimming teams with New Milford High School as the host school / lead agency. Dumont and Bergenfield High School participate in a co-op ice hockey team with Fair Lawn High School as the host school. These co-op programs operate under agreements scheduled to expire at the end of the 2023–24 school year.

The girls volleyball team finished the 1996 season with a record of 19–7 after winning the Group II state championship against New Milford High School in the final match of the tournament.

=== Music ===
Dumont High School has been known for its music department. The Dumont High School Marching Band has been performing at the North Jersey High School Band Festival for over 30 years, as one of the largest marching bands in Bergen County. In the past the band has played half-time shows for the New York Jets at Giants Stadium. In 2017, the Dumont High School Marching Band was nominated by Senator Cory Booker to represent the state of New Jersey in the National Memorial Day Parade in Washington D.C.

=== Theatre and arts ===
The Dumont High School produces productions. Such shows include Godspell, Grease, Anything Goes, Matchmaker, Romeo and Juliet, Little Shop of Horrors, Midsummer Night's Dream, A Funny Thing Happened on the Way to the Forum, Sweeney Todd: The Demon Barber of Fleet Street, The Two Month Rule, Seussical the Musical, Beauty and the Beast, "Shrek the Musical," "Xanadu," and "The Spongebob Musical" (2022).

=== NJDFL ===
Dumont High School is a member of the New Jersey Drama and Forensics League. The students have the opportunity to compete against other high schools in pair pieces, scenes, monologues, improvisation, speeches and storytelling. Dumont won the championship in 2002, taking home the inaugural Looby Cup. Dumont High School took home the Looby Cup once again in 2010 after accumulating a total of 256 points at a championship tournament at Raritan High School. The team won by a margin of 63 points over second-place finisher Mainland Regional High School. Dumont High School kept the Looby Cup at home after winning the state championships for a second straight time in 2011. Dumont won the team sweepstakes with a total of 235 points, only 5 points more than second-place finisher Absegami High School.

== Awards, recognition and rankings ==
The school was the 101st-ranked public high school in New Jersey out of 339 schools statewide in New Jersey Monthly magazine's September 2014 cover story on the state's "Top Public High Schools," using a new ranking methodology. The school had been ranked 118th in the state of 328 schools in 2012, after being ranked 106th in 2010 out of 322 schools listed. The magazine ranked the school 162nd in 2008 out of 316 schools. The school was ranked 174th in the magazine's September 2006 issue, which surveyed 316 schools across the state.

== Notable alumni ==
- Dominick Barlow (born 2003), professional basketball player for the Philadelphia 76ers of the NBA, on a two-way contract with the Delaware Blue Coats of the NBA G League
- John Battaglia (1955–2018), convicted murderer who was executed by the state of Texas for killing his two daughters in 2001 in an act of revenge against his estranged wife
- Rich Edson (born 1981), Fox News Channel correspondent
- Sean Lissemore (born 1986), former NFL defensive tackle who played for the Dallas Cowboys and the San Diego Chargers
- Kevin McMullan (born 1968), former professional baseball player who is an assistant coach for the Virginia Cavaliers baseball team
- Thomas Nozkowski (1944–2019, class of 1961), contemporary painter
- Frank C. Osmers Jr. (1907–1977), politician who represented New Jersey's 9th congressional district in the United States House of Representatives from 1939 to 1943 and again from 1951 to 1965
- Jerry Palmieri (born 1958), football strength and conditioning coach, who was on the staff for the New York Giants
- Geoff Rickly (born 1979), lead singer of the band Thursday
