= WRSU-FM =

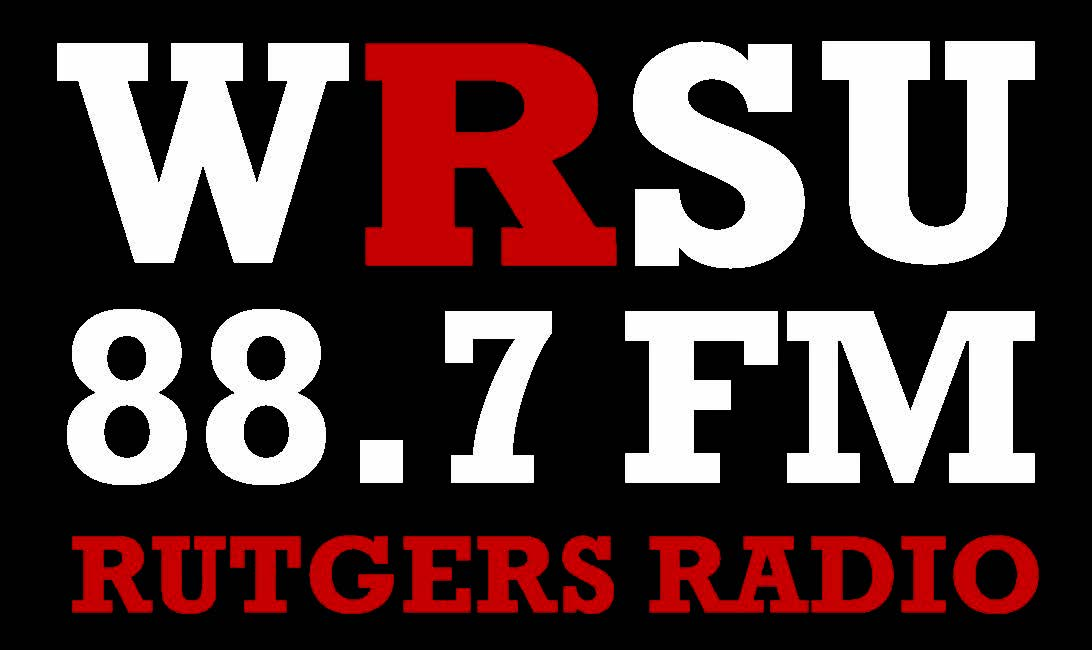
- New Brunswick, New Jersey; United States
- Broadcast area: Central New Jersey
- Frequency: 88.7 MHz

Programming
- Format: Non-commercial campus radio

Ownership
- Owner: Rutgers University

History
- Founded: April 26, 1948
- First air date: January 27, 1974
- Former frequencies: 680 AM
- Call sign meaning: "Rutgers, the State University"

Technical information
- Licensing authority: FCC
- Facility ID: 4277
- Class: A
- ERP: 1,350 watts
- HAAT: 38 meters (125 ft)
- Transmitter coordinates: 40.4668°N 74.4371°W

Links
- Public license information: Public file; LMS
- Webcast: Listen live
- Website: wrsu.org

WRSU-FM (88.7 FM) is a non-commercial college radio station serving the greater Central New Jersey area, broadcasting from the campus of Rutgers University in New Brunswick, New Jersey. It is a student-run radio station, with alum Mike Pavlichko serving as faculty advisor.

== Programming ==
WRSU currently operates mostly on free-form programming. Shows do not have to fit a certain style with DJs creating their own playlists. Genres of music that the station features include indie rock, alternative rock and heavy metal music. The station also broadcasts electronic music, rap/hip-hop, and other diverse genres of music. There is an eclectic level of diversity in WRSU's specialty programming, and many shows focus on one particular brand of music and are broadcast weekly. The station commits its Sunday programming schedule to members of the diverse New Brunswick community.

The station helps select and present live local bands and musicians on stage at the annual Rutgers Day festival.

=== Sports ===
WRSU has a large listenership for its sports programming, as the WRSU Sports department covers a wide range of teams to train students for a career in broadcast media. The station has been broadcasting Rutgers athletics since 1954.

Student broadcasters perform play-by-play coverage of all home and away games for Rutgers football, Rutgers men's basketball, and Rutgers women's basketball. WRSU remains the flagship station for the Rutgers women's basketball program. WRSU's student sportscasters also broadcast all home games for the Rutgers baseball and men's and women's soccer teams, and broadcasts of Rutgers lacrosse and wrestling have also been incorporated into the station's schedule in recent years. WRSU also credentials students to cover many home games as sports reporters, allowing members of the department to practice writing game stories and opinion pieces to be posted on the WRSU website. In 2019, WRSU Sports was named "Best Football Play by Play" by the Intercollegiate Broadcasting System at its 2019 international conference in New York City.

Since 1974, WRSU has hosted a post game show, called Knightline, for listeners to call-in and discuss Rutgers athletics after every Football and Men's Basketball broadcast.

==== Sports talk ====
The station currently broadcasts several weekly sports talk shows, hosted by members of the Sports department. These shows feature frequent interviews from members of the regional and national sports media, as well as those within the Rutgers athletic community, as well as listener phone calls. In September 2019, the numerous sports shows - including the longtime Tuesday evening show "SportsKnight" - were consolidated into "WRSU Crew", an afternoon drive-time show that often serves as a lead-in to evening sports broadcasts.

=== News ===
WRSU features daily newscasts during the school year, covering events, issues, and trends happening at Rutgers, with national and local headline reports, Sports reports, and weather forecasts.

The news department also produces KnightBeat, a news-talk show featuring interviews with campus organizations and leaders, discussions of the latest news headlines, and detailed profiles and discussions of Rutgers issues.

The WRSU news department also provides live coverage of Rutgers events, as well as annual election coverage. In recent years WRSU has broadcast from both the Democratic and Republican Presidential Conventions Headquarters.

WRSU provided live coverage of the 2008 Presidential election on November 4, featuring live reports from the New Jersey Democratic and Republican headquarters, analysis by Rutgers political commentators, up-to-the-minute results, and live reports from College Avenue during student celebrations.

== History ==
WRSU first went on the air on April 26, 1948. In its earliest inception, WRSU was an AM Carrier Current station that broadcast from 12 College Avenue, with transmitters in the basements of several Rutgers dormitory buildings, as well as at the New Jersey College for Women, which would eventually become Douglass College. During this period, WRSU ran on the 630 AM band. The station's first general manager and founder was Charles Brookwell, Class of '49.

Beginning in the 1950s, the station changed frequencies and changed operating facilities, eventually moving to 680 on the AM band. The carrier current transmitters were expanded to include operation in 23 dormitory buildings on three campuses. The current offices of the station began to be used in 1969 and are located at 126 College Avenue located in the Rutgers Student Center.

WRSU-AM ceased operation in 1976, two years after the inception of WRSU-FM.

WRSU-FM

WRSU-FM went on the air at 88.7 MHz with 1350 watts ERP on January 27, 1974. During the 1950s and 1960s, the station played current popular music, but starting in the '70s, the station underwent a conscious effort to introduce album-oriented progressive/free form movement with a heavy concentration on Community Affairs. The first song ever played was Crosby, Stills, and Nash's "Suite: Judy Blue Eyes" The seventies were also a time when live interviews with singers began and ranged from the local band Holme to Wonder Woman Linda Carter promoting her first album.

== Philosophy ==
WRSU has a station playlist of current music, but it generally consists of several hundred entire albums, and individual DJs have a large amount of control over the format of their shows. The station is strictly non-commercial, and aims for a free-form style of broadcasting.

The station is under the management of Rutgers University. While operations are on a strictly volunteer level and no course credit is involved for students, the station does seek to develop the skills of their student personnel for practical use in professional broadcasting fields.

== Funding and operations ==
WRSU receives funding from Rutgers University, and is a strictly non-commercial radio station. However, WRSU does receive grants and underwriting from local businesses and record stores. Usually, this underwriting takes the form of a credit for the station at said record store in exchange for hourly notices broadcast on the station.

== Notable alumni ==
For more than 60 years, WRSU has prepared many of its students for a career in sports, news and entertainment media.

- Livingston Allen, content creator on Instagram, YouTube, Spotify and Complex.
- Tim Catalfamo, racing reporter for MRN Radio.
- Mark Chernoff, former Program Director at K-Rock, WFAN.
- Gordon Deal, host of This Morning, America's First News with Gordon Deal.
- Rich DeMarco, Army West Point Associate Athletic Director-Broadcasting, play-by-play voice of the Army Black Knights.
- Rich Edison, Washington correspondent, Fox News.
- Mike Emanuel, correspondent for Fox News.
- Bernard Goldberg, commentator for Fox News, correspondent for HBO's Real Sports with Bryant Gumbel.
- Mark Greenberg, founding member of MTV management group.
- Erica Herskowitz, sports update anchor, WFAN and Audacy New York.
- Jeff Koyen, journalist and entrepreneur.
- Zubin Mehenti, SportsCenter anchor, ESPN.
- Mike Pavlichko, current Broadcast Administrator, owner/operator Central Jersey Sports Radio.
- Matt Pinfield, music personality, TV host on MTV and VH1.
- Dominick Savino, Rutgers Athletics play-by-play on BTN+ broadcasts.
- Neil Solondz, pregame radio host for the Tampa Bay Rays.

== See also ==
- List of college radio stations in the United States
- New Brunswick, New Jersey music scene
- Rutgers University student organizations
