= Kevin McMullan =

American baseball coach (born 1968)

Current position
- Title: Associate head coach
- Team: Mississippi State
- Conference: SEC

Biographical details
- Born: September 22, 1968 (age 57)

Playing career
- 1987–1990: IUP
- 1990: Salt Lake City Trappers
- 1991: Fort Lauderdale Yankees
- 1991: Greensboro Hornets
- 1992: Salt Lake City Trappers
- Position: Catcher / First baseman

Coaching career (HC unless noted)
- 1994–1996: IUP (asst.)
- 1997–1999: St. John's (asst.)
- 2000–2002: East Carolina (asst.)
- 2003–2025: Virginia (asst.)
- 2026–present: Mississippi State (asst.)

Kevin B. "Mac" McMullan is an American baseball coach, currently an assistant baseball coach for the Mississippi State University Bulldogs of the National Collegiate Athletic Association (NCAA).

As a member of the University of Virginia Cavaliers baseball coaching staff, McMullan recruited and trained players to develop the quality of the baseball program at the university; under his tutelage baseball classes have achieved rankings of 12th (2004), 10th (2005), 8th (2006), 13th (2007), and 14th (2008) in inter-college NCAA competitions. Four of five teams coached by McMullan have been placed in USA's top 40 for fielding percentage.

== Biography ==
Raised in Dumont, New Jersey, McMullan graduated from Dumont High School. He studied at the Indiana University of Pennsylvania, where he was a multi-sport athlete. He played as catcher for the IUP baseball baseball team and as linebacker for the IUP football team; he was awarded the honor of All-American for both sports. During his college career, he was a part of six championship teams at IUP. After graduating in 1990 he became a professional baseball player for the New York Yankees (1990–92) and the Salt Lake City Trappers (1990 and 1992). In 1990, he was a Pioneer League All-Star with the Trappers.

McMullan began coaching on the University of Virginia baseball program in 2003. Previously he had coached within other college programs and was a manager and coordinator for the Atlanta Braves, coaching the club's catchers and hitters during spring training. In 2009, he was named the ABCA/Baseball America Assistant Coach of the Year.

In 2001–02, he was a recruiting coordinator, hitting coach, and catching instructor for the Pirates, East Carolina University's baseball team; he later became the Pirate's acting head coach. Under McMullan's three-year tenure, the Pirates recorded 138 wins and 46 losses, finished within the top 25 teams each year, and won three conference championships and an NCAA Regional Championship.

Players coached by McMullan have gone on to play in Major League Baseball, including Ryan Zimmerman (Washington Nationals), Mark Reynolds (Arizona Diamondbacks) and Joe Koshansky (Colorado Rockies).
