= Dominick Barlow =

American basketball player (born 2003)

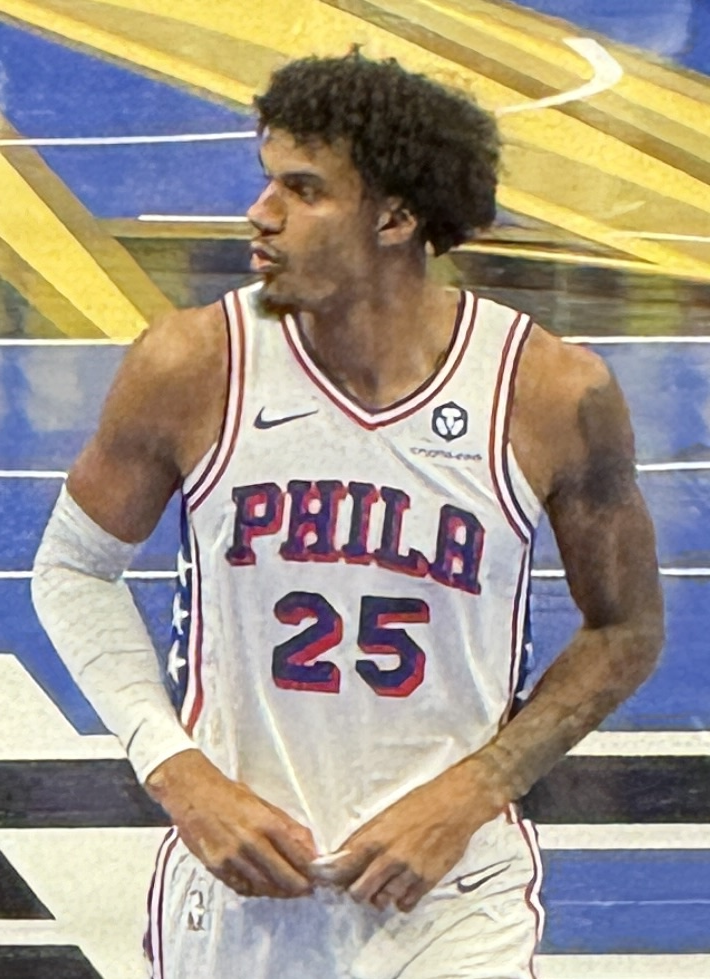
- Barlow with the Philadelphia 76ers in 2025

No. 25 – Philadelphia 76ers
- Position: Power forward
- League: NBA

Personal information
- Born: May 26, 2003 (age 23) Hackensack, New Jersey, U.S.
- Listed height: 6 ft 9 in (2.06 m)
- Listed weight: 224 lb (102 kg)

Career information
- High school: Dumont (Dumont, New Jersey); St. Joseph's Prep (Philadelphia, Pennsylvania)
- NBA draft: 2022: undrafted
- Playing career: 2021–present

Career history
- 2021–2022: Team Overtime
- 2022–2024: San Antonio Spurs
- 2022–2024: →Austin Spurs
- 2024–2025: Atlanta Hawks
- 2024–2025: →College Park Skyhawks
- 2025–present: Philadelphia 76ers

Career highlights
- NBA G League Next Up Game (2024)
- Stats at NBA.com
- Stats at Basketball Reference

Dominick Barlow (born May 26, 2003) is an American professional basketball player for the Philadelphia 76ers of the National Basketball Association (NBA).

== High school career ==
As a freshman for St. Joseph’s Prep, Barlow saw his season cut short due to a torn labrum in his shoulder. Upon going into his sophomore year, he transferred to Dumont High School closer to his native North Jersey. Barlow attended Dumont High School in his hometown of Dumont, New Jersey. Barlow assumed a leading role in his junior season and averaged 23.3 points and 12.6 rebounds per game. During his senior season, which was limited to eight games by the COVID-19 pandemic, he averaged 27.6 points, 17 rebounds, 3.1 assists and 2.6 blocks per game. Barlow was named North Jersey Player of the Year. He played for the New York Rens at the Nike Elite Youth Basketball League, helping the team reach the Peach Jam semifinals. Barlow was a four-star recruit and intended to play a postgraduate season at Bridgton Academy in Bridgton, Maine before pursuing professional options.

== Professional career ==
=== Team Overtime (2021–2022) ===
On September 2, 2021, Barlow signed with Team Overtime for the Overtime Elite's inaugural season. He played for Team Overtime in OTE, averaging 14.8 points and 5.9 rebounds per game.

=== San Antonio / Austin Spurs (2022–2024) ===
After going undrafted in the 2022 NBA draft, Barlow signed a two-way contract with the San Antonio Spurs, becoming the first Overtime Elite player to make an NBA roster. Barlow joined the Spurs' 2022 NBA Summer League roster and made his Summer League debut on July 8, 2022, scoring nine points and seven rebounds in a 90–99 loss to the Cleveland Cavaliers. Barlow made his proper NBA debut with the Spurs on November 2, 2022, by getting two points and three assists in a 143–100 blowout loss against the Toronto Raptors.

On January 28, 2023, in 126–110 loss to the Rio Grande Valley Vipers in the NBA G League, Barlow finished with a double-double career-high game of 32 points, 10 rebounds, and 3 blocks for Austin. On April 2, 2023, Barlow recorded his first double-double in the NBA with 12 points and 10 rebounds alongside a season-high 5 assists in a 142–134 overtime win over the Sacramento Kings. In the final game of Barlow's rookie season just a week later, he recorded career-highs of 21 points and 19 rebounds in a 138–117 win over the Dallas Mavericks.

On July 27, 2023, Barlow signed a two-way contract for the 2023–24 NBA season. He was converted to a standard NBA contract on March 2, 2024.

=== Atlanta Hawks (2024–2025) ===
On July 30, 2024, Barlow signed a two-way contract with the Atlanta Hawks.

On March 4, 2025, Barlow signed a standard two-year contract with the Hawks.

=== Philadelphia 76ers (2025–present) ===
On July 9, 2025, Barlow signed a two-way contract with the Philadelphia 76ers. On February 2, 2026, in a game against the Los Angeles Clippers, Barlow recorded a career-high 26 points, along with 16 rebounds, including 10 offensive. On February 5, he signed a standard NBA contract of 2-years, $6.8 million with the 76ers. Barlow made 71 appearances (including 59 starts) for Philadelphia during the 2025–26 NBA season, recording averages of 7.7 points, 4.8 rebounds, and 1.2 assists.

== Career statistics ==
Legend
GP	Games played	GS	Games started	MPG	Minutes per game
FG%	Field goal percentage	3P%	3-point field goal percentage	FT%	Free throw percentage
RPG	Rebounds per game	APG	Assists per game	SPG	Steals per game
BPG	Blocks per game	PPG	Points per game	**Bold**	Career high

=== NBA ===
==== Regular season ====
Year	Team	GP	GS	MPG	FG%	3P%	FT%	RPG	APG	SPG	BPG	PPG
2022–23	San Antonio	28	0	14.6	.535	.000	**.720**	3.6	.9	.4	**.7**	3.9
2023–24	San Antonio	33	1	12.7	.496	**.333**	.690	3.4	1.1	.4	.4	4.4
2024–25	Atlanta	35	4	10.7	.531	.259	.636	2.4	.5	.3	.5	4.2
2025–26	Philadelphia	**71**	**59**	**23.8**	**.539**	.256	.718	**4.8**	**1.2**	**.9**	**.7**	**7.7**
**Career**		167	64	17.3	.530	.254	.701	3.8	1.0	.6	.6	5.7

==== Playoffs ====
Year	Team	GP	GS	MPG	FG%	3P%	FT%	RPG	APG	SPG	BPG	PPG
2026	Philadelphia	9	0	10.7	.588	.000	.857	1.7	.1	.2	.4	2.9
**Career**		9	0	10.7	.588	.000	.857	1.7	.1	.2	.4	2.9
