= Jabari Walker =

American basketball player (born 2002)

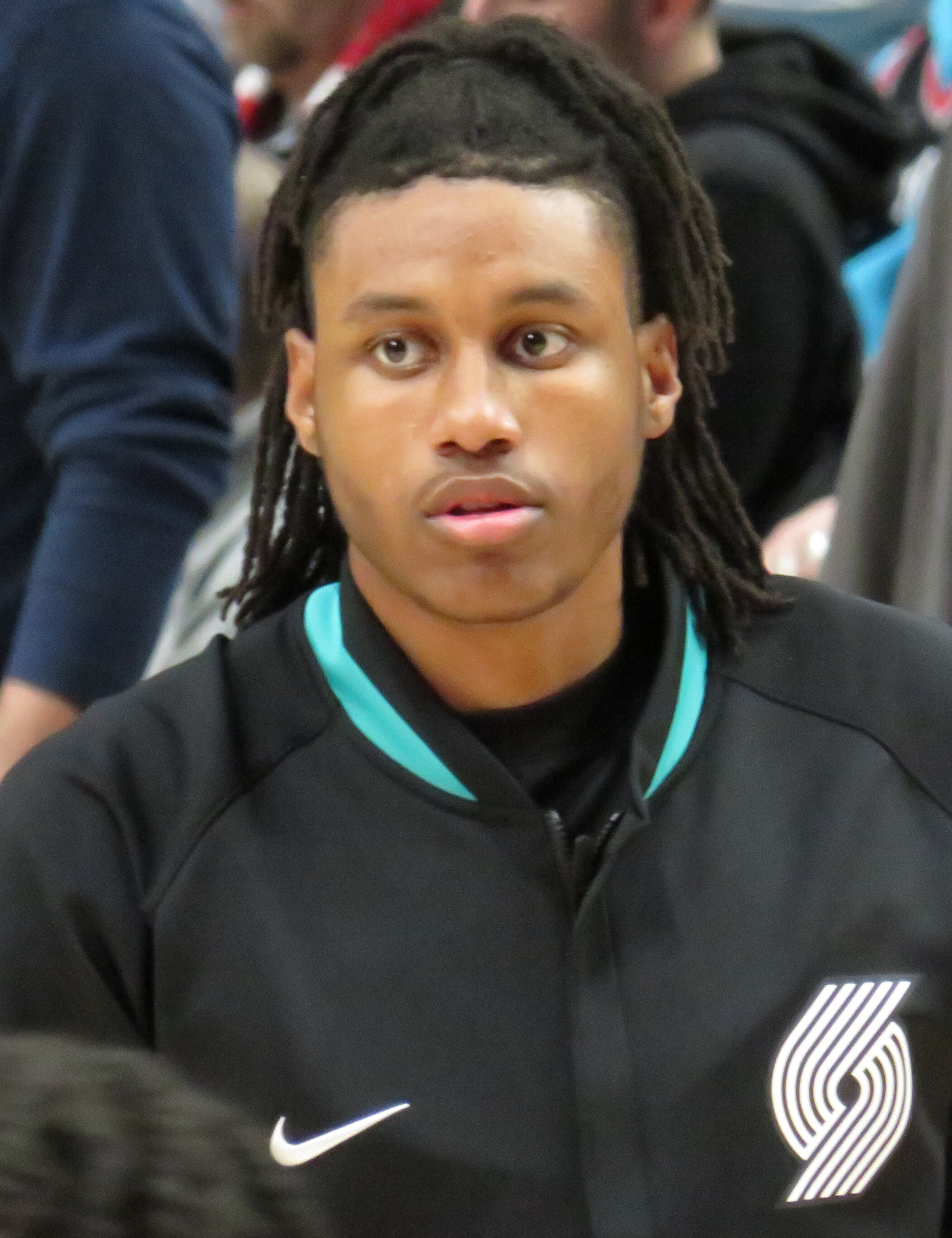
- Walker with the Portland Trail Blazers in 2022

No. 33 – Philadelphia 76ers
- Position: Power forward / small forward
- League: NBA

Personal information
- Born: July 30, 2002 (age 24) Wichita, Kansas, U.S.
- Listed height: 6 ft 7 in (2.01 m)
- Listed weight: 237 lb (108 kg)

Career information
- High school: Campbell Hall (Los Angeles, California); AZ Compass Prep (Chandler, Arizona)
- College: Colorado (2020–2022)
- NBA draft: 2022: 2nd round, 57th overall pick
- Drafted by: Portland Trail Blazers
- Playing career: 2022–present

Career history
- 2022–2025: Portland Trail Blazers
- 2025: →Rip City Remix
- 2025–present: Philadelphia 76ers
- 2025–2026: →Delaware Blue Coats

Career highlights
- First-team All-Pac-12 (2022); Pac-12 All-Freshman Team (2021)
- Stats at NBA.com
- Stats at Basketball Reference

Jabari Dominic Walker (born July 30, 2002) is an American professional basketball player for the Philadelphia 76ers of the National Basketball Association (NBA). He is the son of Samaki Walker and brother of University of California basketball player Sakima Walker. He played college basketball for the Colorado Buffaloes. He was named first-team All-Pac-12 as a sophomore with Colorado. He was drafted with the 57th pick in the 2022 NBA draft by the Portland Trail Blazers.

== Early life ==
Walker played basketball for Campbell Hall School in Los Angeles, California, for three years. For his senior season, he transferred to AZ Compass Prep in Chandler, Arizona. As a senior, he averaged 13 points, 8 rebounds, and 1.5 blocks per game. Walker competed for Dream Vision on the Amateur Athletic Union circuit. He committed to playing college basketball for Colorado over offers from California and Saint Mary's.

== College career ==
On January 14, 2021, Walker recorded 23 points and 11 rebounds in an 89–60 win over California. In February, he missed six games with a foot injury. On March 20, 2021, Walker scored a freshman season-high 24 points, shooting 5-of-5 from three-point range, in a 96–73 victory over Georgetown at the first round of the NCAA tournament. As a freshman, he averaged 7.6 points and 4.3 rebounds per game, earning Pac-12 All-Freshman Team honors. On January 25, 2022, Walker tied a career high with 24 points in an 82–78 win over Oregon. As a sophomore, he averaged 14.6 points and 9.4 rebounds per game and was named first-team All-Pac-12. On March 30, 2022, Walker declared for the 2022 NBA draft while maintaining his college eligibility. He later signed with an agent, forgoing his remaining eligibility.

== Professional career ==
=== Portland Trail Blazers / Rip City Remix (2022–2025) ===
Walker was selected with the 57th overall pick in the 2022 NBA draft by the Portland Trail Blazers. He joined the Blazers' 2022 NBA Summer League team. In his Summer League debut, Walker recorded eleven points and seven rebounds in an 81–78 loss to the Detroit Pistons. On July 13, 2022, Walker signed his rookie scale contract with the Trail Blazers. He made 56 appearances for the Trail Blazers during his rookie season, averaging 3.9 points, 2.3 rebounds, and 0.6 assists.

Walker made 72 appearances (including 23 starts) for Portland in the 2023–24 NBA season, recording averages of 8.9 points, 7.1 rebounds, and 1.0 assists (all career-high marks).

On February 2, 2025, Walker was assigned to the Rip City Remix. He played in 60 games (including one start) for the Trail Blazers during the 2024–25 season, averaging 5.2 points, 3.5 rebounds, and 0.6 assists.

=== Philadelphia 76ers (2025–present) ===
On July 5, 2025, Walker signed a two-way contract with the Philadelphia 76ers and Delaware Blue Coats. On February 19, 2026, the 76ers signed Walker to a standard NBA contract. He made 64 appearances (six starts) for Philadelphia in the 2025–26 season, recording averages of 4.3 points, 3.0 rebounds, and 0.5 assists.

== Career statistics ==
Legend
GP	Games played	GS	Games started	MPG	Minutes per game
FG%	Field goal percentage	3P%	3-point field goal percentage	FT%	Free throw percentage
RPG	Rebounds per game	APG	Assists per game	SPG	Steals per game
BPG	Blocks per game	PPG	Points per game	**Bold**	Career high

=== NBA ===
==== Regular season ====
Year	Team	GP	GS	MPG	FG%	3P%	FT%	RPG	APG	SPG	BPG	PPG
2022–23	Portland	56	0	11.1	.419	.286	**.756**	2.3	.6	.2	.2	3.9
2023–24	Portland	**72**	**23**	**23.6**	.460	.295	.754	**7.1**	**1.0**	**.6**	**.3**	**8.9**
2024–25	Portland	60	1	12.5	**.515**	**.389**	.690	3.5	.6	**.6**	.1	5.2
2025–26	Philadelphia	64	6	11.9	.455	.337	.735	3.0	.5	.4	.2	4.3
Career		252	30	15.2	.463	.323	.738	4.1	.7	.4	.2	5.7

==== Playoffs ====
Year	Team	GP	GS	MPG	FG%	3P%	FT%	RPG	APG	SPG	BPG	PPG
2026	Philadelphia	6	0	4.8	.100	.000	1.000	1.0	.0	.0	.0	.7
Career		6	0	4.8	.100	.000	1.000	1.0	.0	.0	.0	.7

=== College ===
Year	Team	GP	GS	MPG	FG%	3P%	FT%	RPG	APG	SPG	BPG	PPG
2020–21	Colorado	26	0	14.2	**.526**	**.523**	.778	4.3	.5	.5	.5	7.6
2021–22	Colorado	**33**	**33**	**28.1**	.461	.346	**.784**	**9.4**	**1.2**	**.7**	**.7**	**14.6**
Career		59	33	22.0	.479	.399	.783	7.2	.9	.6	.6	11.5

== Personal life ==
Walker's father, Samaki, played in the NBA for 10 years. He has two siblings who play basketball: his brother, Dibaji, plays in the NBA G League for Cleveland Charge, and his sister, Sakima, at the University of California at Berkeley. Walker is a fan of Boxing.
