= 2024–25 BC Žalgiris season =

BC Žalgiris
2024–25 season
- President: (Lithuanian Basketball Federation) Paulius Jankūnas
- Head coach: (Italian Basketball Federation) Andrea Trinchieri
- Arena: Žalgiris Arena
- LKL: Winners
- EuroLeague: 13th place
- King Mindaugas Cup: Winners
- Highest home attendance: LKL: 14,417; Žalgiris 76–69 Rytas (21 June 2025) EuroLeague: 15,325; Žalgiris 65–72 Fenerbahçe Beko (15 November 2024)
- Lowest home attendance: LKL: 1,665; Žalgiris 105–88 Nevėžis–Optibet (29 April 2025) EuroLeague: 14,357; Žalgiris 73–53 ALBA Berlin (4 February 2025)
- Average home attendance: LKL: 5,242; EuroLeague: 14,886
- Biggest win: Uniclub Bet – Juventus 67–128 Žalgiris (29 December 2024)
- Biggest defeat: Žalgiris 64–83 Real Madrid (10 January 2025)
Home	Away

The 2024–25 BC Žalgiris season is Žalgiris's 81st in the existence of the club.

Times up to 27 October 2024 and from 30 March 2025 are EEST (UTC+3). Times from 27 October 2024 to 30 March 2025 are EET (UTC+2).

== Players ==
=== Current roster ===
Note: Flags indicate national team eligibility at FIBA-sanctioned events. Players may hold other non-FIBA nationalities not displayed.

Žalgiris roster
Players
Coaches

Pos.	No.	Nat.	Name	Ht.	Wt.	Age
G/F	0	(Lithuania)	Juzėnas, Mantas	2.00 m (6 ft 7 in)	91 kg (201 lb)	19 – 16 November 2006
PG	3	(France)	Francisco, Sylvain	1.86 m (6 ft 1 in)	82 kg (181 lb)	28 – 10 October 1997
PG	4	(Lithuania)	Lekavičius, Lukas	1.80 m (5 ft 11 in)	78 kg (172 lb)	32 – 30 March 1994
G/F	8	(Lithuania) (Canada)	Brazdeikis, Ignas	2.01 m (6 ft 7 in)	100 kg (220 lb)	27 – 8 January 1999
G	9	(Lithuania)	Giedraitis, Dovydas	1.93 m (6 ft 4 in)	93 kg (205 lb)	26 – 17 August 2000
C	15	(Lithuania)	Birutis, Laurynas	2.13 m (7 ft 0 in)	114 kg (251 lb)	29 – 27 August 1997
F/C	18	(Serbia)	Smailagić, Alen	2.08 m (6 ft 10 in)	98 kg (216 lb)	26 – 18 August 2000
F	21	(United States)	Mitchell, Matt	1.99 m (6 ft 6 in)	107 kg (236 lb)	27 – 18 March 1999
C	23	(Lithuania)	Bieliauskas, Aleksas	2.07 m (6 ft 9 in)	106 kg (234 lb)	20 – 3 December 2005
C	42	(United States) (Armenia)	Dunston, Bryant	2.03 m (6 ft 8 in)	107 kg (236 lb)	40 – 28 May 1986
PF	45	(United States)	Manek, Brady	2.06 m (6 ft 9 in)	105 kg (231 lb)	28 – 4 September 1998
F	51	(Lithuania)	Butkevičius, Arnas	1.97 m (6 ft 6 in)	95 kg (209 lb)	33 – 22 November 1992
G/F	91	(Lithuania)	Sirvydis, Deividas	2.04 m (6 ft 8 in)	94 kg (207 lb)	26 – 10 June 2000
F	92	(Lithuania)	Ulanovas, Edgaras (C)	1.99 m (6 ft 6 in)	99 kg (218 lb)	34 – 7 January 1992

Head coach

- (Italy) Andrea Trinchieri

Assistant coach(es)

- (Italy) Massimiliano Menetti
- (Lithuania) Tautvydas Sabonis
- (Lithuania) Gintaras Krapikas
- (Lithuania) Vytautas Pliauga
- (Lithuania) Renaldas Seibutis

Athletic trainer(s)

- (Lithuania) Justinas Grainys
- (Lithuania) Nerijus Navickas

Doctor(s)

- (Lithuania) Vytautas Kailius
- (Lithuania) Andrius Aukštakalnis

Physiotherapist(s)

- (Lithuania) Romas Petraitis

Legend

- (C) Team captain
- Injured

- Roster
Updated: February 22, 2025

=== Depth chart ===
Pos.	Starting 5	Bench 1	Bench 2	Inactive
C	Laurynas Birutis	Bryant Dunston		Aleksas Bieliauskas
PF	Matt Mitchell	Alen Smailagić	Brady Manek
SF	Edgaras Ulanovas	Arnas Butkevičius
SG	Deividas Sirvydis	Ignas Brazdeikis		Mantas Juzėnas
PG	Sylvain Francisco	Dovydas Giedraitis	Lukas Lekavičius

=== Squad changes for the 2024–25 season ===
==== Players in ====
No.	Pos.	Nat.	Name	Moving from		Type	Date	Source
91	G/F	(Lithuania)	Deividas Sirvydis	Lietkabelis Panevėžys	(Lithuania)	End of contract	18 June 2024	
21	F	(United States)	Matt Mitchell	Beşiktaş	(Turkey)	End of contract	27 June 2024	
18	F/C	(Serbia)	Alen Smailagić	Partizan	(Serbia)	End of contract	28 June 2024	
3	PG	(France)	Sylvain Francisco	Bayern Munich	(Germany)	Buyout	1 July 2024	
1	G	(United States)	Tyrone Wallace	Türk Telekom	(Turkey)	End of contract	10 July 2024	
42	C	(Armenia)	Bryant Dunston	Virtus Bologna	(Italy)	End of contract	17 July 2024	
8	SF	(Lithuania)	Ignas Brazdeikis	Olympiacos	(Greece)	Parted ways	24 July 2024	
1	SG	(United States)	Lonnie Walker IV	Brooklyn Nets	(United States)	Parted ways	31 October 2024	

==== Players out ====
No.	Pos.	Nat.	Name	Moving to		Type	Date	Source
6	C	(Lithuania)	Matas Vokietaitis	Florida Atlantic Owls	(United States)	Parted ways	19 May 2024	
31	F	(Lithuania)	Dovydas Butka	Pepperdine Waves	(United States)	Parted ways	23 May 2024	
10	PF	(Latvia)	Rolands Šmits	Anadolu Efes	(Turkey)	Buyout	15 June 2024	
16	SG	(Lithuania)	Karolis Lukošiūnas	Juventus Utena	(Lithuania)	End of contract	21 June 2024	
23	SF	(United States)	Demetre Rivers	Pallacanestro Brescia	(Italy)	End of contract	21 June 2024	
26	PG	(United States)	Edmond Sumner	Sichuan Blue Whales	(China)	End of contract	21 June 2024	
12	SG	(Lithuania)	Nedas Montvila	Nevėžis Kėdainiai	(Lithuania)	Parted ways	2 July 2024	
2	PG	(United States)	Keenan Evans	Olympiacos Piraeus	(Greece)	End of contract	6 July 2024	
35	F/C	(Lithuania)	Danielius Lavrinovičius	Lietkabelis Panevėžys	(Lithuania)	Parted ways	12 July 2024	
8	C	(Central African Republic)	Kevarrius Hayes	Paris Basketball	(France)	Parted ways	17 July 2024	
1	G	(United States)	Tyrone Wallace	Galatasaray	(Turkey)	Parted ways	20 October 2024	
1	SG	(United States)	Lonnie Walker IV	Philadelphia 76ers	(United States)	Buyout	19 February 2025	
33	SG	(Lithuania)	Tomas Dimša	Casasemont Zaragoza	(United States)	Parted ways	20 February 2025	

==== Players out on loan ====
No.	Pos.	Nat.	Name	Moving to		Type	Date	Source
17	G/F	(Lithuania)	Mantas Rubštavičius	Lietkabelis Panevėžys	(Lithuania)	Loan	29 July 2024	

== Pre-season and friendlies ==
=== Friendly matches ===
4 September 2024	Žalgiris (Lithuanian Basketball Federation)	89–57	(Lithuanian Basketball Federation) Uniclub Bet – Juventus	Kaunas
18:30	Scoring by quarter: 29–12, 28–14, 13–20, 19–11
	Pts: three players 12; Rebs: Smailagić 6 Asts: Ulanovas 7 PIR: Smailagić 20	Report	Pts: Beliauskas 14; Rebs: Toro 6 Asts: Thorpe 4 PIR: Beliauskas 9	Arena: Žalgiris Arena; Referees: Artūras Šukys, Juozas Barkauskas

8 September 2024	Žalgiris (Lithuanian Basketball Federation)	94–62	(Azerbaijan Basketball Federation) Sabah BC	Kaunas
18:30	Scoring by quarter: 31–13, 20–14, 28–22, 15–13
	Pts: Manek 19; Rebs: Manek 7 Asts: Ulanovas 5 PIR: Manek 21	Report	Pts: Gravett, Williams 15; Rebs: Čavars 7 Asts: Gravett 4 PIR: Williams 14	Arena: Žalgiris Arena; Referees: Lauras Vitkauskas, Lukas Saulevicius

11 September 2024	Žalgiris (Lithuanian Basketball Federation)	74–75	(Turkish Basketball Federation) Tofaş S.K.	Antalya
18:15	Scoring by quarter: 17–16, 25–16, 18–22, 14–21
	Pts: Manek 20; Rebs: Birutis 6 Asts: Francisco 6 PIR: Manek 21	Report	Pts: O'Brien, Pérez 16; Rebs: Thompson 11; Asts: Reed 3 PIR: O'Brien, Saybir 18	Arena: Gloria Sports Arena; Attendance: 50; Referees: Hüseyi̇n Çamci, Sezer Bor

13 September 2024	ALBA Berlin (German Basketball Federation)	60–80	(Lithuanian Basketball Federation) Žalgiris	Antalya
19:15	Scoring by quarter: 14–25, 22–17, 9–14, 15–24
	Pts: McDowell-White 15; Rebs: McDowell-White 6 Asts: McDowell-White 4 PIR: McDowell-White 22	Report	Pts: Ulanovas, Sirvydis 13; Rebs: Dunston 7 Asts: Francisco, Ulanovas 4 PIR: Ulanovas 20	Arena: Gloria Sports Arena; Attendance: 50; Referees: Yarkin Keski̇n, Sezer Bor

15 September 2024	Anadolu Efes (Turkish Basketball Federation)	75–64	(Lithuanian Basketball Federation) Žalgiris	Antalya
17:30	Scoring by quarter: 19–14, 17–20, 19–21, 20–9
	Pts: Bryant 18; Rebs: Osmani 8 Asts: Bryant 5 PIR: Bryant 23	Report	Pts: three players 10; Rebs: Butkevičius 7 Asts: Ulanovas 3 PIR: Butkevičius, Francisco 10	Arena: Gloria Sports Arena; Attendance: 20; Referees: Yi̇ği̇t Gönültş, Hüseyi̇n Çamci

== Competitions ==
=== Overview ===
Competition	First match	Last match	Starting round	Final position	Record							
Competition	First match	Last match	Starting round	Final position	Pld	W	D	L	PF	PA	PD	Win %
LKL	22 September 2024	21 June 2025	Regular season	Winners	46	42		4	4,141	3,416	+725	91.30
EuroLeague	3 October 2024	11 April 2025	Regular season	13th place	34	15		19	2,626	2,669	−43	44.12
King Mindaugas Cup	23 December 2024	16 February 2025	Quarter-finals	Winners	4	4		0	369	318	+51	100.00
Total					84	61	0	23	7,136	6,403	+733	72.62

Last updated: 21 June 2025
Source: Competitions

=== LKL ===
==== League table ====
Pos	Team	Pld	W	L	PF	PA	PD	Qualification or relegation
1	Žalgiris	36	34	2	3286	2644	+642	Advance to playoffs
2	Rytas	36	29	7	3350	3033	+317	Advance to playoffs
3	7Bet–Lietkabelis	36	20 (Note: 7Bet–Lietkabelis are ahead of Wolves Twinsbet on head-to-head record: 7Bet–Lietkabelis 4–0 Wolves Twinsbet.)	16	3006	2921	+85	Advance to playoffs
4	Wolves Twinsbet	36	20	16	3253	3209	+44	Advance to playoffs
5	Cbet	36	19	17	3221	3240	−19	Advance to playoffs

Source: LKL.lt
Rules for classification: 1) Win–loss record; 2) Percentage of wins; 3) Head–to–head record; 4) Head–to–head percentage of wins; 5) Head–to–head point difference; 6) Head–to–head points scored; 7) Point difference; 8) Points scored; 9) Lottery draw (Note: Head–to–head record is used only after all the matches between the teams in question have been played)

==== Results summary ====
Overall						Home					Away				
Pld	W	L	PF	PA	PD	W	L	PF	PA	PD	W	L	PF	PA	PD
36	34	2	3286	2644	+642	18	0	1662	1268	+394	16	2	1624	1376	+248

Last updated: 21 May 2025.
Source: Competitive matches

==== Results by round ====
Round	1	2	3	4	5	6	7	8	9	10	11	12	13	14	15	16	17	18	19	20	21	22	23	24	25	26	27	28	29	30	31	32	33	34	35	36
Ground	A	A	A	A	H	A	H	A	H	H	H	H	A	A	H	A	H	H	H	A	H	A	A	H	A	H	A	H	A	H	A	H	A	H	H	A
Result	W	W	W	L	W	L	W	W	W	W	W	W	W	W	W	W	W	W	W	W	W	W	W	W	W	W	W	W	W	W	W	W	W	W	W	W
Position	1	1	1	2	3	2	2	2	2	2	1	1	1	1	1	1	1	1	1	1	1	1	1	1	1	1	1	1	1	1	1	1	1	1	1	1

Source: Competitive matches
A = Away; H = Home; W = Win; L = Loss; R = Rest

==== Matches ====
22 September 2024 1	Šiauliai–Casino Admiral	63–91	Žalgiris	Šiauliai
16:50	Scoring by quarter: 19–17, 15–23, 16–28, 13–23
	Pts: Kulvietis 14; Rebs: Kupšas 9 Asts: Uleckas 4 PIR: Kupšas 16	Boxscore	Pts: Brazdeikis, Sirvydis 14; Rebs: Dunston 8 Asts: Francisco 6 PIR: Lekavičius 19	Arena: Šiauliai Arena; Attendance: 4,757; Referees: Saulius Račys, Aurimas Borusas, Jonas Lazauskas

25 September 2024 2	Cbet	72–93	Žalgiris	Jonava
19:00	Scoring by quarter: 20–22, 16–24, 19–26, 17–21
	Pts: Venskus 13; Rebs: Majauskas 11; Asts: three players PIR: Majauskas 20	Boxscore	Pts: Birutis 15; Rebs: Smailagić 10; Asts: Ulanovas 5 PIR: Smailagić 21	Arena: Jonava Arena; Attendance: 1,988; Referees: Artūras Šukys, Andžej Urbanovič, Darius Šomka

29 September 2024 3	Nevėžis–Optibet	76–89	Žalgiris	Kėdainiai
18:30	Scoring by quarter: 19–27, 19–24, 23–20, 15–18
	Pts: Ebo 24; Rebs: three players Asts: Ebo 7 PIR: Ebo 23	Boxscore	Pts: Wallace 23; Rebs: Dunston 6 Asts: Mitchell 3 PIR: Wallace 26	Arena: Kėdainiai Arena; Attendance: 1,552; Referees: Jurgis Laurinavičius, Gabrielius Simonavičius, Gintaras Vitkauskas

6 October 2024 4	Rytas	91–88	Žalgiris	Vilnius
16:50	Scoring by quarter: 22–18, 28–17, 23–25, 18–28
	Pts: Radzevičius 20; Rebs: Masiulis 9 Asts: Cole 4 PIR: Radzevičius 27	Boxscore	Pts: Dunston, Ulanovas 16; Rebs: Birutis, Giedraitis 3 Asts: Francisco 8 PIR: Francisco, Ulanovas 19	Arena: Twinsbet Arena; Attendance: 8,491; Referees: Gytis Vilius, Artūras Šukys, Gvidas Gedvilas

20 October 2024 5	Žalgiris	73–66	7Bet–Lietkabelis	Kaunas
16:50	Scoring by quarter: 13–24, 17–15, 23–14, 20–13
	Pts: Birutis 17; Rebs: Birutis, Sirvydis 4 Asts: Francisco 8 PIR: Francisco 26	Boxscore	Pts: Pecarski 14; Rebs: Pecarski 6 Asts: Rubštavičius 3 PIR: Varnas 16	Arena: Žalgiris Arena; Attendance: 4,460; Referees: Gytis Vilius, Saulius Račys, Gintaras Mačiulis

27 October 2024 6	Wolves Twinsbet	100–82	Žalgiris	Vilnius
16:50	Scoring by quarter: 20–20, 23–18, 32–14, 25–30
	Pts: Andrews 21; Rebs: Brooks 10; Asts: Andrews 7 PIR: Andrews, Cowan Jr. 24	Boxscore	Pts: Francisco 25; Rebs: Francisco 7 Asts: Butkevičius 5 PIR: Francisco 36	Arena: Twinsbet Arena; Attendance: 7,139; Referees: Jurgis Laurinavičius, Juozas Barkauskas, Dovydas Kairys

3 November 2024 7	Žalgiris	84–67	Uniclub Bet – Juventus	Kaunas
16:50	Scoring by quarter: 20–9, 20–22, 21–10, 23–26
	Pts: Lekavičius 18; Rebs: four players 5 Asts: Giedraitis 6 PIR: Lekavičius 17	Boxscore	Pts: Beliauskas 14; Rebs: Toro 11; Asts: Orelik, Thorpe 4 PIR: Toro 19	Arena: Žalgiris Arena; Attendance: 3,551; Referees: Gvidas Gedvilas, Gintaras Vitkauskas, Darius Šomka

10 November 2024 8	Neptūnas	70–97	Žalgiris	Klaipėda
16:50	Scoring by quarter: 19–28, 19–25, 12–23, 20–21
	Pts: Agravanis 17; Rebs: Waterman 9 Asts: Janavičius 9 PIR: Agravanis 20	Boxscore	Pts: Walker IV 19; Rebs: three players 5 Asts: Francisco 5 PIR: Butkevičius 26	Arena: Švyturys Arena; Attendance: 4,889; Referees: Gytis Vilius, Artūras Šukys, Aurimas Borusas

17 November 2024 9	Žalgiris	101–46	M Basket-Delamode	Kaunas
16:50	Scoring by quarter: 26–8, 26–13, 24–12, 25–13
	Pts: Smailagić 20; Rebs: Sirvydis 9 Asts: Giedraitis 7 PIR: Birutis 27	Boxscore	Pts: English 14; Rebs: Sabeckis, Urkis 6 Asts: Sabeckis 4 PIR: Urkis 14	Arena: Žalgiris Arena; Attendance: 2,803; Referees: Gintaras Mačiulis, Dovydas Kairys, Vidmantas Rušinas

1 December 2024 10	Žalgiris	101–64	Cbet	Kaunas
16:50	Scoring by quarter: 19–10, 27–13, 27–25, 28–16
	Pts: Birutis 16; Rebs: Birutis 8 Asts: Francisco 10; PIR: Francisco 17	Boxscore	Pts: three players 13; Rebs: Kreišmontas 6 Asts: Zotov 4 PIR: Majauskas 14	Arena: Žalgiris Arena; Attendance: 2,845; Referees: Gvidas Gedvilas, Aurimas Borusas, Gabrielius Simonavičius

8 December 2024 11	Žalgiris	78–67	Rytas	Kaunas
16:50	Scoring by quarter: 19–21, 20–11, 18–16, 21–19
	Pts: Brazdeikis 16; Rebs: Smailagić 11; Asts: Brazdeikis 5 PIR: Brazdeikis, Smailagić 25	Boxscore	Pts: Graves 18; Rebs: Tubelis 13; Asts: Flagg, Normantas 4 PIR: Tubelis 17	Arena: Žalgiris Arena; Attendance: 13,359; Referees: Gytis Vilius, Saulius Račys, Gvidas Gedvilas

15 December 2024 12	Žalgiris	91–75	Neptūnas	Kaunas
16:50	Scoring by quarter: 25–14, 23–23, 21–20, 22–18
	Pts: Smailagić 19; Rebs: Birutis 5 Asts: Francisco, Ulanovas 5 PIR: Smailagić 20	Boxscore	Pts: Pavelka 20; Rebs: Pavelka 7 Asts: Janavičius 6 PIR: Pavelka 33	Arena: Žalgiris Arena; Attendance: 3,862; Referees: Artūras Šukys, Dovydas Kairys, Martynas Karaliūnas

29 December 2024 13	Uniclub Bet – Juventus	67–128	Žalgiris	Utena
17:00	Scoring by quarter: 11–29, 17–33, 19–34, 20–32
	Pts: Green 18; Rebs: Toro 6 Asts: Beliauskas 5 PIR: Green 16	Boxscore	Pts: Lekavičius 23; Rebs: Birutis, Smailagić 5 Asts: Francisco 9 PIR: Francisco 39	Arena: Utena Arena; Attendance: 2,827; Referees: Jurgis Laurinavičius, Dovydas Kairys, Gintaras Vitkauskas

5 January 2025 14	7Bet–Lietkabelis	85–89	Žalgiris	Panevėžys
16:50	Scoring by quarter: 24–24, 22–19, 15–25, 24–21
	Pts: Danusevičius 14; Rebs: Danusevičius, Gagić 8 Asts: Bičkauskis 6 PIR: Gagić 19	Boxscore	Pts: Francisco 21; Rebs: Birutis 8 Asts: Francisco, Ulanovas 4 PIR: Francisco 21	Arena: Kalnapilio Arena; Attendance: 4,096; Referees: Artūras Šukys, Juozas Barkauskas, Eimantas Vasiliauskas

12 January 2025 15	Žalgiris	88–86	Nevėžis–Optibet	Kaunas
19:00	Scoring by quarter: 26–21, 23–24, 18–20, 21–21
	Pts: Lekavičius 20; Rebs: Birutis 9 Asts: Butkevičius, Giedraitis 5 PIR: Birutis 25	Boxscore	Pts: Ebo 24; Rebs: Kozys 8 Asts: Ebo 8 PIR: Ebo 31	Arena: Žalgiris Arena; Attendance: 2,694; Referees: Gvidas Gedvilas, Andžej Urbanovič, Jonas Lazauskas

26 January 2025 16	M Basket-Delamode	82–88	Žalgiris	Telšiai
16:50	Scoring by quarter: 17–19, 24–15, 21–33, 20–21
	Pts: Mineikis 17; Rebs: Mineikis 8 Asts: Collins 8 PIR: Mineikis 22	Boxscore	Pts: Walker IV 21; Rebs: Mitchell 8 Asts: Francisco 4 PIR: Walker IV 22	Arena: Telšiai sports arena Attendance: 1,103; Referees: Saulius Račys, Aurimas Borusas, Vidmantas Rušinas

2 February 2025 17	Žalgiris	97–84	Wolves Twinsbet	Kaunas
16:50	Scoring by quarter: 28–29, 36–16, 20–17, 13–22
	Pts: Brazdeikis 20; Rebs: Ulanovas 5 Asts: Ulanovas 6 PIR: Brazdeikis 22	Boxscore	Pts: Blaževič 21; Rebs: Miniotas 8 Asts: Cowan Jr. 5 PIR: Blaževič 30	Arena: Žalgiris Arena; Attendance: 5,942; Referees: Artūras Šukys, Gvidas Gedvilas, Gabrielius Simonavičius

9 February 2025 18	Žalgiris	111–81	Šiauliai–Casino Admiral	Kaunas
16:50	Scoring by quarter: 29–25, 30–20, 24–20, 28–16
	Pts: Smailagić 16; Rebs: Smailagić 6 Asts: Three players 5 PIR: Smailagić 29	Boxscore	Pts: Blakes 22; Rebs: Buchanan 7 Asts: Kulvietis 7 PIR: Blakes 24	Arena: Žalgiris Arena; Attendance: 2,915; Referees: Juozas Barkauskas, Gintaras Vitkauskas, Vidmantas Rušinas

2 March 2025 19	Žalgiris	84–81(OT)	Uniclub Bet – Juventus	Kaunas
16:50	Scoring by quarter: 21–13, 20–22, 18–22, 11–13, Overtime: 14–11
	Pts: Smailagić 19; Rebs: Sirvydis 7 Asts: Francisco 7 PIR: Smailagić 25	Boxscore	Pts: Beliauskas 21; Rebs: Kesteloot, Thorpe 7 Asts: Beliauskas, Thorpe 4 PIR: Beniušis 18	Arena: Žalgiris Arena; Attendance: 5,173; Referees: Artūras Šukys, Andžej Urbanovič, Gintaras Vitkauskas

9 March 2025 20	Rytas	76–83	Žalgiris	Vilnius
16:50	Scoring by quarter: 14–24, 20–17, 15–24, 27–18
	Pts: Graves 14; Rebs: Radzevičius 10; Asts: Cole 4 PIR: Radzevičius 19	Boxscore	Pts: Birutis 16; Rebs: Birutis 10; Asts: Brazdeikis 6 PIR: Birutis 29	Arena: Twinsbet Arena; Attendance: 8,605; Referees: Gytis Vilius, Artūras Šukys, Saulius Račys

16 March 2025 21	Žalgiris	89–62	Cbet	Kaunas
16:50	Scoring by quarter: 22–9, 19–20, 26–13, 22–20
	Pts: Smailagić, Wong 13; Rebs: Wong 9 Asts: Francisco, Giedraitis 5 PIR: Smailagić 17	Boxscore	Pts: Childress 21; Rebs: Three players 5 Asts: Childress 4 PIR: Childress 19	Arena: Žalgiris Arena; Attendance: 3632; Referees: Gytis Vilius, Andžej Urbanovič, Jonas Lazauskas

23 March 2025 22	Nevėžis–Optibet	80–84	Žalgiris	Kėdainiai
16:50	Scoring by quarter: 16–21, 18–20, 26–26, 20–17
	Pts: Ebo 22; Rebs: Girard III 6 Asts: Ebo 12; PIR: Ebo 26	Boxscore	Pts: Francisco 25; Rebs: Butkevičius 6 Asts: Wong 5 PIR: Francisco 34	Arena: Kėdainiai Arena; Attendance: 1,792; Referees: Artūras Šukys, Dovydas Kairys, Darius Šomka

30 March 2025 23	Neptūnas	67–80	Žalgiris	Klaipėda
16:50	Scoring by quarter: 14–20, 22–14, 15–28, 16–18
	Pts: Johnson 22; Rebs: Pacevičius 6 Asts: Buie 6 PIR: Johnson 21	Boxscore	Pts: Francisco, Giedraitis 15; Rebs: Birutis 8 Asts: Dunston, Francisco 3 PIR: Francisco 18	Arena: Švyturys Arena; Attendance: 4,309; Referees: Artūras Šukys, Aurimas Borusas, Darius Šomka

6 April 2025 24	Žalgiris	83–79	7Bet–Lietkabelis	Kaunas
16:50	Scoring by quarter: 21–16, 18–26, 18–20, 26–17
	Pts: Smailagić 21; Rebs: Birutis, Smailagić 6 Asts: Francisco 6 PIR: Smailagić 25	Boxscore	Pts: Kovliar, Rubštavičius 20; Rebs: Danusevičius 6 Asts: Kovliar 8 PIR: Rubštavičius 24	Arena: Žalgiris Arena; Attendance: 4,344; Referees: Gytis Vilius, Juozas Barkauskas, Dovydas Kairys

13 April 2025 25	M Basket-Delamode	80–105	Žalgiris	Telšiai
16:50	Scoring by quarter: 24–31, 15–24, 23–20, 18–30
	Pts: Mathon 24; Rebs: Mathon 7 Asts: Čižauskas 6 PIR: Mathon 28	Boxscore	Pts: Sirvydis 17; Rebs: Birutis 10; Asts: Giedraitis 8 PIR: Ulanovas 21	Arena: Telšiai sports arena Attendance: 1,003; Referees: Juozas Barkauskas, Gintaras Vitkauskas, Deividas Mačiulskis

16 April 2025 26	Žalgiris	98–56	Šiauliai–Casino Admiral	Kaunas
18:50	Scoring by quarter: 21–11, 21–17, 31–17, 25–11
	Pts: Brazdeikis 15; Rebs: Brazdeikis 6 Asts: Sirvydis 4 PIR: Brazdeikis 23	Boxscore	Pts: Buchanan 16; Rebs: Romančenko 8 Asts: Three players 2 PIR: Buchanan 15	Arena: Žalgiris Arena; Attendance: 2,450; Referees: Juozas Barkauskas, Gabrielius Simonavičius, Jonas Lazauskas

19 April 2025 27	Wolves Twinsbet	69–81	Žalgiris	Vilnius
16:50	Scoring by quarter: 18–18, 22–19, 20–22, 9–22
	Pts: Cowan Jr. 18; Rebs: Miniotas 13; Asts: Miniotas 5 PIR: Cowan Jr., Miniotas 18	Boxscore	Pts: Francisco 15; Rebs: Four players 3 Asts: Francisco 6 PIR: Francisco 21	Arena: Twinsbet Arena; Attendance: 3,757; Referees: Artūras Šukys, Andžej Urbanovič, Darius Šomka

24 April 2025 28	Žalgiris	109–63	M Basket-Delamode	Kaunas
18:50	Scoring by quarter: 31–20, 26–7, 32–12, 20–24
	Pts: Mitchell 22; Rebs: Birutis 8 Asts: Buika 7 PIR: Mitchell 28	Boxscore	Pts: Urkis 17; Rebs: Urkis 5 Asts: Čižauskas, Kasemets 5 PIR: Urkis 19	Arena: Žalgiris Arena; Attendance: 2,162; Referees: Artūras Šukys, Dovydas Kairys, Deividas Mačiulskis

26 April 2025 29	Uniclub Bet – Juventus	75–96	Žalgiris	Utena
17:00	Scoring by quarter: 16–18, 17–21, 18–31, 24–26
	Pts: Mathon 19; Rebs: Kesteloot 5 Asts: Three players 3 PIR: Mathon 28	Boxscore	Pts: Smailagić 23; Rebs: Birutis 8 Asts: Giedraitis, Ulanovas 4 PIR: Smailagić 23	Arena: Utena Arena; Attendance: 2,076; Referees: Gytis Vilius, Andžej Urbanovič, Jonas Lazauskas

29 April 2025 30	Žalgiris	105–88	Nevėžis–Optibet	Kaunas
18:50	Scoring by quarter: 24–18, 27–30, 29–23, 25–17
	Pts: Mitchell 22; Rebs: Birutis 14; Asts: Francisco 8 PIR: Birutis 26	Boxscore	Pts: Girard III 31; Rebs: Croswell 7 Asts: Vaitkus 5 PIR: Girard III 31	Arena: Žalgiris Arena; Attendance: 1,665; Referees: Gintaras Mačiulis, Juozas Barkauskas, Vidmantas Rušinas

3 May 2025 31	7Bet–Lietkabelis	76–88	Žalgiris	Panevėžys
16:50	Scoring by quarter: 16–21, 20–22, 22–26, 18–19
	Pts: Rubštavičius 15; Rebs: Danusevičius, Rubštavičius 6 Asts: Bičkauskis, Kovliar 4 PIR: Bičkauskis 20	Boxscore	Pts: Francisco 16; Rebs: Brazdeikis 7 Asts: Francisco 6 PIR: Francisco 19	Arena: Kalnapilio Arena; Attendance: 2,790; Referees: Saulius Račys, Gvidas Gedvilas, Gabrielius Simonavičius

7 May 2025 32	Žalgiris	84–49	Neptūnas	Kaunas
18:50	Scoring by quarter: 20–7, 27–8, 22–18, 15–16
	Pts: Mitchell 15; Rebs: Wong 5 Asts: Ulanovas 4 PIR: Sirvydis 15	Boxscore	Pts: Pacevičius 10; Rebs: Pacevičius 9 Asts: Buie, Janavičius 4 PIR: Pacevičius 14	Arena: Žalgiris Arena; Attendance: 2,602; Referees: Aurimas Borusas, Gabrielius Simonavičius, Vidmantas Rušinas

11 May 2025 33	Cbet	81–91	Žalgiris	Jonava
19:00	Scoring by quarter: 24–20, 22–25, 12–25, 23–21
	Pts: Childress 17; Rebs: Brewton 9 Asts: Brewton 5 PIR: Childress 20	Boxscore	Pts: Francisco 15; Rebs: Dunston 5 Asts: Francisco 7 PIR: Francisco 25	Arena: Jonava Arena; Attendance: 2,116; Referees: Artūras Šukys, Dovydas Kairys, Andžej Urbanovič

14 May 2025 34	Žalgiris	89–75	Wolves Twinsbet	Kaunas
18:50	Scoring by quarter: 21–20, 29–16, 23–16, 16–23
	Pts: Brazdeikis 14; Rebs: Ulanovas 7 Asts: Francisco 7 PIR: Francisco 26	Boxscore	Pts: Cowan Jr. 16; Rebs: Thurman 6 Asts: Žemaitis 4 PIR: Three players 11	Arena: Žalgiris Arena; Attendance: 3,544; Referees: Saulius Račys, Gvidas Gedvilas, Juozas Barkauskas

18 May 2025 35	Žalgiris	97–79	Rytas	Kaunas
16:50	Scoring by quarter: 25–11, 22–18, 22–26, 28–24
	Pts: Brazdeikis, Francisco 16; Rebs: Ulanovas 7 Asts: Francisco 9 PIR: Francisco 26	Boxscore	Pts: Cole 20; Rebs: Tubelis, Masiulis 5 Asts: Cole, Normantas 5 PIR: Cole 24	Arena: Žalgiris Arena; Attendance: 12,898; Referees: Gytis Vilius, Artūras Šukys, Dovydas Kairys

21 May 2025 36	Šiauliai–Casino Admiral	66–71	Žalgiris	Šiauliai
18:50	Scoring by quarter: 17–23, 23–12, 11–21, 15–15
	Pts: Buchanan 14; Rebs: Uleckas 8 Asts: Singleton 3 PIR: Uleckas 13	Boxscore	Pts: Francisco 16; Rebs: Birutis, Sirvydis 8 Asts: Francisco 6 PIR: Birutis 17	Arena: Šiauliai Arena; Attendance: 3,542; Referees: Gvidas Gedvilas, Gabrielius Simonavičius, Martynas Karaliūnas

=== LKL Playoffs ===
==== Quarterfinals ====
24 May 2025 Game 1	Žalgiris	88–75 (Series: 1–0)	Neptūnas	Kaunas
16:00	Scoring by quarter: 21–14, 22–20, 24–21, 21–20
	Pts: Smailagić 16; Rebs: Ulanovas 8 Asts: Brazdeikis 5 PIR: Ulanovas 26	Boxscore	Pts: Johnson 16; Rebs: Waterman 8 Asts: Buie 5 PIR: Waterman 19	Arena: Žalgiris Arena; Attendance: 2,176; Referees: Jurgis Laurinavičius, Gabrielius Simonavičius, Darius Šomka

26 May 2025 Game 2	Neptūnas	70–98 (Series: 0–2)	Žalgiris	Klaipėda
18:50	Scoring by quarter: 22–22, 13–27, 17–27, 18–22
	Pts: Hesson 18; Rebs: Pacevičius 13; Asts: Johnson 7 PIR: Pacevičius 32	Boxscore	Pts: Francisco 17; Rebs: Birutis 6 Asts: Francisco 6 PIR: Francisco 21	Arena: Švyturys Arena; Attendance: 2,822; Referees: Gytis Vilius, Gintaras Mačiulis, Andžej Urbanovič

==== Semifinals ====
29 May 2025 Game 1	Žalgiris	73–61 (Series: 1–0)	Cbet	Kaunas
18:50	Scoring by quarter: 16–17, 22–10, 14–25, 21–9
	Pts: Smailagić 16; Rebs: Brazdeikis 9 Asts: Francisco 8 PIR: Francisco 22	Boxscore	Pts: Brewton 18; Rebs: Pleikys 10; Asts: Brewton 4 PIR: Brewton 26	Arena: Žalgiris Arena; Attendance: 2,483; Referees: Gytis Vilius, Aurimas Borusas, Dovydas Kairys

31 May 2025 Game 2	Cbet	74–98 (Series: 0–2)	Žalgiris	Jonava
16:50	Scoring by quarter: 18–26, 28–27, 13–31, 15–14
	Pts: Brewton 13; Rebs: four players 3 Asts: Brewton 4 PIR: Brewton 17	Boxscore	Pts: Brazdeikis 16; Rebs: Birutis 6 Asts: Francisco 7 PIR: Butkevičius 19	Arena: Jonava Arena; Attendance: 1,925; Referees: Artūras Šukys, Saulius Račys, Andžej Urbanovič

3 June 2025 Game 3	Žalgiris	86–78 (Series: 3–0)	Cbet	Kaunas
18:50	Scoring by quarter: 28–25, 18–15, 22–18, 18–20
	Pts: Brazdeikis 15; Rebs: Butkevičius 5 Asts: Francisco 10; PIR: Francisco 21	Boxscore	Pts: Childress 16; Rebs: Blyzniuk 6 Asts: Blyzniuk 5 PIR: Blyzniuk 21	Arena: Žalgiris Arena; Attendance: 4,349; Referees: Gytis Vilius, Jurgis Laurinavičius, Gabrielius Simonavičius

==== Final ====
12 June 2025 Game 1	Žalgiris	89–97(OT) (Series: 0–1)	Rytas	Kaunas
18:50	Scoring by quarter: 15–19, 17–22, 20–17, 21–15, Overtime: 9–9, 7–15
	Pts: Francisco 31; Rebs: Dunston 8 Asts: Francisco, Giedraitis 3 PIR: Francisco 29	Boxscore	Pts: Tubelis 21; Rebs: Radzevičius, Tubelis 8 Asts: Gudaitis, Sargiūnas 4 PIR: Tubelis 23	Arena: Žalgiris Arena; Attendance: 9,281; Referees: Gytis Vilius, Gvidas Gedvilas, Gintaras Mačiulis

14 June 2025 Game 2	Rytas	79–83 (Series: 1–1)	Žalgiris	Vilnius
16:50	Scoring by quarter: 20–15, 13–21, 22–21, 24–26
	Pts: Jackson-Cartwright 20; Rebs: Tubelis 6 Asts: Cole 4 PIR: Jackson-Cartwright 21	Boxscore	Pts: Sirvydis 20; Rebs: Dunston, Smailagić 5 Asts: Francisco 4 PIR: Francisco 20	Arena: Twinsbet Arena; Attendance: 8,463; Referees: Gytis Vilius, Saulius Račys, Jurgis Laurinavičius

17 June 2025 Game 3	Žalgiris	80–86 (Series: 1–2)	Rytas	Kaunas
18:50	Scoring by quarter: 15–21, 16–28, 33–18, 16–19
	Pts: Francisco 19; Rebs: Birutis 6 Asts: Francisco 6 PIR: Ulanovas 21	Boxscore	Pts: Sargiūnas 17; Rebs: Tubelis 9 Asts: Cole 6 PIR: Tubelis 20	Arena: Žalgiris Arena; Attendance: 12,205; Referees: Gytis Vilius, Saulius Račys, Artūras Šukys

19 June 2025 Game 4	Rytas	83–84 (Series: 2–2)	Žalgiris	Vilnius
16:50	Scoring by quarter: 24–15, 22–26, 22–13, 15–30
	Pts: Cole 22; Rebs: Tubelis 8 Asts: Cole 5 PIR: Cole 25	Boxscore	Pts: Francisco 29; Rebs: Birutis, Francisco 5 Asts: Francisco 7 PIR: Francisco 34	Arena: Twinsbet Arena; Attendance: 9,310; Referees: Gytis Vilius, Artūras Šukys, Juozas Barkauskas

21 June 2025 Game 5	Žalgiris	76–69 (Series: 3–2)	Rytas	Kaunas
16:50	Scoring by quarter: 15–15, 14–15, 21–25, 26–24
	Pts: Francisco 15; Rebs: Birutis 8 Asts: Francisco 7 PIR: Francisco 21	Boxscore	Pts: Jackson-Cartwright, Tubelis 16; Rebs: Tubelis 10; Asts: Jackson-Cartwright, Normantas 4 PIR: Tubelis 17	Arena: Žalgiris Arena; Attendance: 14,417; Referees: Gytis Vilius, Jurgis Laurinavičius, Juozas Barkauskas

=== EuroLeague ===
==== League table ====
Pos	Team	Pld	W	L	PF	PA	PD
11	(Italian Basketball Federation) EA7 Emporio Armani Milan	34	17	17	2896	2934	−38
12	(Basketball Federation of Serbia) Partizan Mozzart Bet	34	16	18	2780	2724	+56
13	(Lithuanian Basketball Federation) Žalgiris	34	15	19	2626	2669	−43
14	(Spanish Basketball Federation) Baskonia	34	14	20	2795	2830	−35
15	(French Federation of Basketball) LDLC ASVEL	34	13	21	2740	2897	−157

Source: EuroLeague
Rules for classification: Regular season tiebreakers

==== Results summary ====
Overall						Home					Away				
Pld	W	L	PF	PA	PD	W	L	PF	PA	PD	W	L	PF	PA	PD
34	15	19	2626	2669	−43	10	7	1298	1287	+11	5	12	1328	1382	−54

Last updated: 11 April 2025.
Source: Competitive matches

==== Results by round ====
Round	1	2	3	4	5	6	7	8	9	10	11	12	13	14	15	16	17	18	19	20	21	22	23	24	25	26	27	28	29	30	31	32	33	34
Ground	H	A	A	A	H	H	H	A	A	H	H	H	A	H	A	A	H	A	H	H	H	A	A	H	H	H	A	A	H	A	A	A	H	A
Result	W	L	W	W	W	W	W	L	L	L	W	L	L	W	W	W	L	L	L	L	W	L	L	L	W	L	W	L	W	L	L	L	W	L
Position	7	8	6	4	2	2	1	3	6	9	7	8	10	9	7	4	8	9	11	12	11	12	13	13	13	13	13	13	13	13	13	13	13	13

Source: Competitive matches
A = Away; H = Home; W = Win; L = Loss; P = Postponed

==== Matches ====
3 October 2024 1	Žalgiris (Lithuanian Basketball Federation)	74–67	(Spanish Basketball Federation) Barcelona	Kaunas
20:00	Scoring by quarter: 21–14, 22–17, 7–17, 24–19
	Pts: Francisco 19; Rebs: Mitchell 6 Asts: Francisco 3 PIR: Francisco 22	Boxscore	Pts: Laprovíttola 12; Rebs: Satoranský 7 Asts: Laprovíttola 8 PIR: Laprovíttola 20	Arena: Žalgiris Arena; Attendance: 14,962; Referees: Emin Moğulkoç, Ioannis Foufis, Josip Radojković

11 October 2024 2	Olympiacos (Hellenic Basketball Federation)	74–68	(Lithuanian Basketball Federation) Žalgiris	Piraeus
21:15	Scoring by quarter: 21–6, 14–18, 17–19, 22–25
	Pts: Vezenkov 17; Rebs: Vezenkov 11; Asts: Walkup 7 PIR: Vezenkov 30	Boxscore	Pts: Sirvydis 17; Rebs: Dunston 6 Asts: Francisco 6 PIR: Sirvydis 15	Arena: Peace and Friendship Stadium; Attendance: 11,085; Referees: Sreten Radović, Milivoje Jovčić, Sašo Petek

15 October 2024 3	Virtus Segafredo Bologna (Italian Basketball Federation)	68–71	(Lithuanian Basketball Federation) Žalgiris	Bologna
21:30	Scoring by quarter: 15–16, 15–28, 22–16, 16–11
	Pts: Clyburn 16; Rebs: Shengelia 11; Asts: Pajola 5 PIR: Shengelia, Pajola 17	Boxscore	Pts: Giedraitis 15; Rebs: Birutis, Smailagić 6 Asts: Francisco 8 PIR: Giedraitis 20	Arena: Unipol Arena; Attendance: 7,634; Referees: Carlos Peruga, Joseph Bissang, Eduard Udyanskyy

17 October 2024 4	EA7 Emporio Armani Milan (Italian Basketball Federation)	82–85	(Lithuanian Basketball Federation) Žalgiris	Assago
21:30	Scoring by quarter: 24–17, 25–14, 17–17, 16–37
	Pts: Mirotić 17; Rebs: Mirotić 11; Asts: Dimitrijević 4 PIR: Mirotić 27	Boxscore	Pts: Giedraitis 21; Rebs: Butkevičius 6 Asts: Francisco 6 PIR: Francisco, Giedraitis 23	Arena: Unipol Forum; Attendance: 7,550; Referees: Emilio Pérez, Igor Dragojević, Hüseyin Çelik

24 October 2024 5	Žalgiris (Lithuanian Basketball Federation)	78–63	(Israeli Basketball Association) Maccabi Playtika Tel Aviv	Kaunas
20:00	Scoring by quarter: 26–7, 18–17, 15–22, 19–17
	Pts: Ulanovas 14; Rebs: Mitchell, Sirvydis 5 Asts: Francisco 5 PIR: three players 12	Boxscore	Pts: Lee 17; Rebs: Hoard 8 Asts: three players 2 PIR: Lee, Rivero 21	Arena: Žalgirio Arena; Attendance: 14,773; Referees: Piotr Pastusiak, Jordi Aliaga, Aare Halliko

30 October 2024 6	Žalgiris (Lithuanian Basketball Federation)	86–84	(Basketball Federation of Serbia) Crvena zvezda Meridianbet	Kaunas
20:00	Scoring by quarter: 24–18, 23–15, 19–24, 20–27
	Pts: Sirvydis 17; Rebs: Butkevičius 4 Asts: Francisco 7 PIR: Francisco 20	Boxscore	Pts: Miller-McIntyre, Plavšić 16; Rebs: Plavšić 9 Asts: Miller-McIntyre, Nedović 5 PIR: Plavšić 23	Arena: Žalgirio Arena; Attendance: 15,015; Referees: Joseph Bissang, Sergio Silva, Tomasz Trawicki

1 November 2024 7	Žalgiris (Lithuanian Basketball Federation)	63–62	(French Federation of Basketball) Monaco	Kaunas
20:00	Scoring by quarter: 20–11, 14–14, 9–18, 20–19
	Pts: Butkevičius 13; Rebs: Brazdeikis 6 Asts: Francisco, Giedraitis 4 PIR: Birutis, Butkevičius 11	Boxscore	Pts: Loyd 18; Rebs: Blossomgame 9 Asts: James, Loyd 4 PIR: Loyd 23	Arena: Žalgirio Arena; Attendance: 14,922; Referees: Saša Pukl, Jakub Zamojski, Vassilis Pitsilkas

7 November 2024 8	Bayern Munich (German Basketball Federation)	77–74	(Lithuanian Basketball Federation) Žalgiris	Munich
21:45	Scoring by quarter: 19–7, 19–21, 20–19, 19–27
	Pts: Edwards 24; Rebs: Obst 7 Asts: Edwards 5 PIR: Edwards 21	Boxscore	Pts: Francisco 20; Rebs: Dunston 8 Asts: Butkevičius 4 PIR: Ulanovas 20	Arena: SAP Garden; Attendance: 11,200; Referees: Mehdi Difallah, Ioannis Foufis, Maxime Boubert

13 November 2024 9	Paris Basketball (French Federation of Basketball)	83–77	(Lithuanian Basketball Federation) Žalgiris	Paris
21:30	Scoring by quarter: 17–16, 23–20, 22–20, 21–21
	Pts: Shorts 21; Rebs: Hayes 9 Asts: Shorts 6 PIR: Shorts 24	Boxscore	Pts: Brazdeikis 15; Rebs: Butkevičius 9 Asts: Francisco 4 PIR: Butkevičius 19	Arena: Adidas Arena; Attendance: 6,915; Referees: Milan Nedović, Miloš Koljenšić, Anne Panther

15 November 2024 10	Žalgiris (Lithuanian Basketball Federation)	65–72	(Turkish Basketball Federation) Fenerbahçe Beko	Kaunas
20:00	Scoring by quarter: 21–17, 5–26, 21–9, 18–20
	Pts: Walker IV 19; Rebs: Butkevičius 8 Asts: Francisco 3 PIR: Walker IV 21	Boxscore	Pts: Hayes-Davis 18; Rebs: Hayes-Davis 11; Asts: Gudurić, Žagars 3 PIR: Hayes-Davis 23	Arena: Žalgiris Arena; Attendance: 15,325; Referees: Juan Carlos García, Josip Radojković, Noam Gordon

22 November 2024 11	Žalgiris (Lithuanian Basketball Federation)	84–77	(Hellenic Basketball Federation) Panathinaikos AKTOR	Kaunas
20:00	Scoring by quarter: 28–18, 21–24, 16–21, 19–14
	Pts: Walker IV 24; Rebs: Sirvydis 7 Asts: Mitchell 4 PIR: Walker IV 23	Boxscore	Pts: Nunn 19; Rebs: Hernangómez, Lessort 7 Asts: Brown, Nunn 5 PIR: Yurtseven 20	Arena: Žalgirio Arena; Attendance: 14,939; Referees: Carlos Peruga, Rain Peerandi, Hüseyin Çelik

28 November 2024 12	Žalgiris (Lithuanian Basketball Federation)	70–83	(Spanish Basketball Federation) Baskonia	Kaunas
20:00	Scoring by quarter: 17–19, 25–16, 15–17, 13–31
	Pts: Walker IV 19; Rebs: Butkevičius 7 Asts: Butkevičius, Walker IV 3 PIR: Walker IV 15	Boxscore	Pts: Moneke 17; Rebs: Hall 11; Asts: Baldwin 6 PIR: Hall 25	Arena: Žalgirio Arena; Attendance: 15,087; Referees: Mehdi Difallah, Uroš Nikolić, Amit Balak

3 December 2024 13	Partizan Mozzart Bet (Basketball Federation of Serbia)	84–78	(Lithuanian Basketball Federation) Žalgiris	Belgrade
21:30	Scoring by quarter: 22–19, 22–22, 20–23, 20–14
	Pts: C. Jones 19; Rebs: T. Jones 9 Asts: C. Jones 10; PIR: T. Jones 30	Boxscore	Pts: Walker IV 26; Rebs: Francisco, Smailagić 6 Asts: Ulanovas 3 PIR: Walker IV 25	Arena: Belgrade Arena; Attendance: 19,887; Referees: Sreten Radović, Juan Carlos García, Robert Vyklický

5 December 2024 14	Žalgiris (Lithuanian Basketball Federation)	85–72	(Turkish Basketball Federation) Anadolu Efes	Kaunas
20:00	Scoring by quarter: 27–17, 21–13, 15–23, 22–19
	Pts: Walker IV 18; Rebs: Giedraitis 6 Asts: Giedraitis 3 PIR: Walker IV 17	Boxscore	Pts: Bryant 23; Rebs: Willis 8 Asts: Bryant 4 PIR: Bryant 28	Arena: Žalgirio Arena; Attendance: 14,681; Referees: Ilija Belošević, Jordi Aliaga, Eduard Udyanskyy

12 December 2024 15	Real Madrid (Spanish Basketball Federation)	83–92	(Lithuanian Basketball Federation) Žalgiris	Madrid
21:45	Scoring by quarter: 19–24, 19–30, 22–18, 25–19
	Pts: Musa 15; Rebs: Hezonja 8 Asts: Campazzo 5 PIR: Hezonja 22	Boxscore	Pts: Walker 21; Rebs: Francisco 5 Asts: Francisco 4 PIR: Francisco 22	Arena: WiZink Center; Attendance: 7,842; Referees: Damir Javor, Miloš Koljenšić, Luka Kardum

17 December 2024 16	ALBA Berlin (German Basketball Federation)	66–86	(Lithuanian Basketball Federation) Žalgiris	Berlin
21:45	Scoring by quarter: 10–24, 20–21, 16–24, 20–17
	Pts: McCormack 19; Rebs: Wetzell 8 Asts: Spagnolo 7 PIR: McCormack 25	Boxscore	Pts: Francisco 16; Rebs: Butkevičius Walker IV 7 Asts: Ulanovas, Walker IV 4 PIR: Francisco, Walker IV 16	Arena: Uber Arena; Attendance: 7,813; Referees: Uroš Nikolić, Carlos Cortes, Vasiliki Tsaroucha

20 December 2024 17	Žalgiris (Lithuanian Basketball Federation)	72–78	(French Federation of Basketball) LDLC ASVEL	Kaunas
20:00	Scoring by quarter: 16–21, 20–22, 17–13, 19–22
	Pts: Francisco 22; Rebs: Butkevičius 9 Asts: Walker IV 4 PIR: Francisco 25	Boxscore	Pts: Ajinça, Maledon 17; Rebs: Roberson 7 Asts: Maledon 6 PIR: Maledon 24	Arena: Žalgirio Arena; Attendance: 15,091; Referees: Sreten Radović, Seffi Shemmesh, Gentian Cici

26 December 2024 18	Maccabi Playtika Tel Aviv (Israeli Basketball Association)	95–78	(Lithuanian Basketball Federation) Žalgiris	Belgrade
21:05	Scoring by quarter: 26–19, 24–19, 21–18, 24–22
	Pts: Hoard 23; Rebs: Hoard, Jokubaitis 5 Asts: Blatt 6 PIR: Hoard 34	Boxscore	Pts: Francisco, Sirvydis 15; Rebs: Dunston 5 Asts: Francisco 9 PIR: Francisco 23	Arena: Aleksandar Nikolić Hall; Attendance: 139; Referees: Emilio Pérez, Joseph Bissang, Uroš Obrknežević

2 January 2025 19	Žalgiris (Lithuanian Basketball Federation)	85–92	(Hellenic Basketball Federation) Olympiacos	Kaunas
20:00	Scoring by quarter: 22–18, 30–22, 19–27, 14–25
	Pts: Francisco 22; Rebs: Brazdeikis, Dunston 5 Asts: Francisco 6 PIR: Francisco 21	Boxscore	Pts: Vezenkov 24; Rebs: Vezenkov 7 Asts: Walkup 5 PIR: Vezenkov 27	Arena: Žalgiris Arena; Attendance: 14,923; Referees: Miguel Ángel Pérez, Milan Nedović, Kristaps Konstantinovs

10 January 2025 20	Žalgiris (Lithuanian Basketball Federation)	64–83	(Spanish Basketball Federation) Real Madrid	Kaunas
20:00	Scoring by quarter: 26–15, 8–20, 12–20, 18–28
	Pts: Walker IV 17; Rebs: Smailagić, Walker IV 5 Asts: Giedraitis 4 PIR: Walker IV 15	Boxscore	Pts: Musa 17; Rebs: Ndiaye 7 Asts: Campazzo, Rathan-Mayes 4 PIR: Musa 18	Arena: Žalgirio Arena; Attendance: 15,034; Referees: Sreten Radović, Seffi Shemmesh, Hüseyin Çelik

15 January 2025 21	Žalgiris (Lithuanian Basketball Federation)	77–68	(Italian Basketball Federation) Virtus Segafredo Bologna	Kaunas
20:00	Scoring by quarter: 25–13, 16–19, 20–19, 16–17
	Pts: Francisco 20; Rebs: Butkevičius, Dunston 5 Asts: Francisco 4 PIR: Francisco 21	Boxscore	Pts: Cordinier 18; Rebs: Diouf 8 Asts: Pajola 5 PIR: Cordinier 27	Arena: Žalgirio Arena; Attendance: 14,464; Referees: Mehdi Difallah, Robert Vyklický, Sašo Petek

17 January 2025 22	Fenerbahçe Beko (Turkish Basketball Federation)	98–86	(Lithuanian Basketball Federation) Žalgiris	Istanbul
19:45	Scoring by quarter: 17–20, 17–27, 28–21, 36–18
	Pts: Hayes-Davis 21; Rebs: Hayes-Davis 6 Asts: Hall 4 PIR: Gudurić, Hayes-Davis 24	Boxscore	Pts: Smailagić 24; Rebs: Smailagić 6 Asts: Walker IV 6 PIR: Smailagić 25	Arena: Ülker Sports and Event Hall; Attendance: 9,531; Referees: Ilija Belošević, Carlos Cortés, Igor Dragojević

23 January 2025 23	Panathinaikos AKTOR (Hellenic Basketball Federation)	89–76	(Lithuanian Basketball Federation) Žalgiris	Marousi
21:15	Scoring by quarter: 17–25, 17–26, 26–19, 29–6
	Pts: Nunn 26; Rebs: Hernangómez 9 Asts: Grant, Nunn 5 PIR: Gabriel 28	Boxscore	Pts: Walker IV 19; Rebs: four players 4 Asts: Francisco 7 PIR: Walker IV 13	Arena: OAKA Altion; Attendance: 16,754; Referees: Damir Javor, Jordi Aliaga, Marcin Kowalski

30 January 2025 24	Žalgiris (Lithuanian Basketball Federation)	82–97	(German Basketball Federation) Bayern Munich	Kaunas
20:00	Scoring by quarter: 18–22, 13–23, 28–26, 23–26
	Pts: Francisco 33; Rebs: Dunston 7 Asts: Francisco 5 PIR: Francisco 36	Boxscore	Pts: Obst 26; Rebs: three players 7 Asts: Weiler-Babb 13; PIR: Weiler-Babb 34	Arena: Žalgirio Arena; Attendance: 14,678; Referees: Tomislav Hordov, Milan Nedović, Adar Peer

4 February 2025 25	Žalgiris (Lithuanian Basketball Federation)	73–53	(German Basketball Federation) ALBA Berlin	Kaunas
20:00	Scoring by quarter: 25–12, 12–10, 18–15, 18–16
	Pts: Brazdeikis 21; Rebs: Dunston 7 Asts: Francisco 4 PIR: Brazdeikis 22	Boxscore	Pts: three players 10; Rebs: Wetzell 10; Asts: McDowell-White 6 PIR: McCormack 16	Arena: Žalgirio Arena; Attendance: 14,357; Referees: Uroš Nikolić, Joseph Bissang, Michele Rossi

6 February 2025 26	Žalgiris (Lithuanian Basketball Federation)	87–89	(Italian Basketball Federation) EA7 Emporio Armani Milan	Kaunas
20:00	Scoring by quarter: 16–24, 26–26, 24–17, 21–22
	Pts: Francisco 29; Rebs: Walker IV 7 Asts: Francisco 4 PIR: Francisco 27	Boxscore	Pts: LeDay 26; Rebs: Gillespie, Mannion 7 Asts: Mannion 6 PIR: LeDay 36	Arena: Žalgirio Arena; Attendance: 14,705; Referees: Juan Carlos García, Emilio Pérez, Anne Panther

27 February 2025 27	Crvena zvezda Meridianbet (Basketball Federation of Serbia)	80–86	(Lithuanian Basketball Federation) Žalgiris	Belgrade
21:00	Scoring by quarter: 22–23, 21–21, 17–23, 20–19
	Pts: Petrušev 16; Rebs: Bolomboy, Kalinić 5 Asts: Miller-McIntyre, Nedović 4 PIR: Bolomboy 19	Boxscore	Pts: Francisco 25; Rebs: Francisco 6 Asts: Brazdeikis, Francisco 4 PIR: Francisco 31	Arena: Belgrade Arena; Attendance: 20,999; Referees: Miguel Ángel Pérez, Ioannis Foufis, Alberto Baena

6 March 2025 28	Baskonia (Spanish Basketball Federation)	66–65	(Lithuanian Basketball Federation) Žalgiris	Vitoria-Gasteiz
21:30	Scoring by quarter: 18–12, 20–18, 10–13, 18–22
	Pts: Howard, Moneke 13; Rebs: Hall 8 Asts: Forrest 4 PIR: Hall 18	Boxscore	Pts: Brazdeikis 17; Rebs: Ulanovas 11; Asts: Francisco 6 PIR: Brazdeikis 19	Arena: Buesa Arena; Attendance: 8,328; Referees: Tomislav Hordov, Borys Ryzhyk, Gentian Cici

13 March 2025 29	Žalgiris (Lithuanian Basketball Federation)	83–81	(French Federation of Basketball) Paris Basketball	Kaunas
20:00	Scoring by quarter: 14–22, 17–25, 29–14, 23–20
	Pts: Brazdeikis 16; Rebs: Birutis 8 Asts: Francisco 8 PIR: Francisco 24	Boxscore	Pts: Shorts 21; Rebs: Jantunen 5 Asts: Malcolm, Shorts 4 PIR: Hifi 22	Arena: Žalgiris Arena; Attendance: 15,056; Referees: Carlos Peruga, Milivoje Jovčić, Igor Dragojević

21 March 2025 30	Barcelona (Spanish Basketball Federation)	82–70	(Lithuanian Basketball Federation) Žalgiris	Barcelona
21:30	Scoring by quarter: 16–20, 20–11, 23–20, 23–19
	Pts: Brizuela 20; Rebs: Metu 8 Asts: Three players 3 PIR: Anderson 24	Boxscore	Pts: Three players 13; Rebs: Ulanovas 7 Asts: Francisco 5 PIR: Brazdeikis 15	Arena: Palau Blaugrana; Attendance: 6,443; Referees: Saša Pukl, Borys Ryzhyk, Kristaps Konstantinovs

25 March 2025 31	Monaco (French Federation of Basketball)	96–86(OT)	(Lithuanian Basketball Federation) Žalgiris	Fontvieille
20:00	Scoring by quarter: 15–23, 29–25, 14–17, 22–15, Overtime: 16–6
	Pts: James 22; Rebs: Blossomgame 10; Asts: Four players 3 PIR: James, Theis 26	Boxscore	Pts: Francisco 19; Rebs: Butkevičius 8 Asts: Francisco 5 PIR: Brazdeikis 16	Arena: Salle Gaston Médecin; Referees: Ilija Belošević, Uroš Nikolić, Eduard Udyanskyy

27 March 2025 32	ASVEL Basket (French Federation of Basketball)	88–79	(Lithuanian Basketball Federation) Žalgiris	Astroballe
21:00	Scoring by quarter: 23–18, 17–16, 23–27, 25–18
	Pts: Maledon 19; Rebs: Roberson 6 Asts: Maledon 6 PIR: Maledon 20	Boxscore	Pts: Francisco 19; Rebs: Birutis 8 Asts: Francisco 8 PIR: Francisco 26	Arena: Villeurbanne; Referees: Juan Carlos García, Sérgio Silva, Adar Peer

3 April 2025 33	Žalgiris (Lithuanian Basketball Federation)	70–66	(Basketball Federation of Serbia) Partizan Mozzart Bet	Kaunas
20:00	Scoring by quarter: 24–21, 11–19, 14–9, 21–17
	Pts: Francisco 15; Rebs: Brazdeikis 8 Asts: Brazdeikis 5 PIR: Smailagić 16	Boxscore	Pts: Jones 23; Rebs: Bonga, Davies 6 Asts: Jones 4 PIR: Jones 18	Arena: Žalgirio Arena; Attendance: 14,814; Referees: Carlos Peruga, Oļegs Latiševs, Alberto Baena

11 April 2025 34	Anadolu Efes (Turkish Basketball Federation)	87–77	(Lithuanian Basketball Federation) Žalgiris	Istanbul
20:30	Scoring by quarter: 22–14, 27–23, 22–27, 16–13
	Pts: Larkin, Nwora 13; Rebs: Oturu 7 Asts: Thompson 8 PIR: Thompson 19	Boxscore	Pts: Francisco, Ulanovas 12; Rebs: Brazdeikis 7 Asts: Francisco 5 PIR: Ulanovas 12	Arena: Basketball Development Center; Attendance: 9,980; Referees: Miguel Ángel Pérez, Uroš Nikolić, Hugues Thépénier

=== King Mindaugas Cup ===
==== Quarterfinals ====
23 December 2024 1	Šiauliai–Casino Admiral	88–107	Žalgiris	Šiauliai
17:30	Scoring by quarter: 19–34, 26–23, 22–21, 21–29
	Pts: Kupšas, Stankevičius 16; Rebs: Jogėla 6 Asts: Stankevičius 4 PIR: Stankevičius 20	Boxscore	Pts: Walker IV 18; Rebs: Ulanovas 4 Asts: Giedraitis 6 PIR: Francisco, Walker IV 17	Arena: Šiauliai Arena; Attendance: 4,912; Referees: Gvidas Gedvilas, Gabrielius Simonavičius, Vidmantas Rušinas

20 January 2025 2	Žalgiris	92–85 (199–173 agg.)	Šiauliai–Casino Admiral	Kaunas
19:00	Scoring by quarter: 21–19, 29–22, 18–22, 24–22
	Pts: Walker IV 15; Rebs: Three players 6 Asts: Mitchell 6 PIR: Birutis 20	Boxscore	Pts: Stankevičius 18; Rebs: Kupšas 9 Asts: Valinskas 8 PIR: Kupšas 25	Arena: Žalgiris Arena; Attendance: 2,086; Referees: Artūras Šukys, Aurimas Borusas, Darius Šomka

==== Final Four ====
15 February 2025 Semifinals	Žalgiris	79–56	7Bet–Lietkabelis	Vilnius
19:25	Scoring by quarter: 24–13, 14–14, 20–18, 21–11
	Pts: Walker IV 19; Rebs: Birutis, Sirvydis 7 Asts: Francisco 5 PIR: Walker IV 22	Boxscore	Pts: Rubštavičius 14; Rebs: Gagić, Maldūnas 5 Asts: Bičkauskis 4 PIR: Gagić, Rubštavičius 11	Arena: Twinsbet Arena; Attendance: 5,467; Referees: Gytis Vilius, Gvidas Gedvilas, Juozas Barkauskas

16 February 2025 Final	Neptūnas	89–91	Žalgiris	Vilnius
18:10	Scoring by quarter: 25–21, 20–22, 24–25, 20–23
	Pts: Buie 23; Rebs: Pavelka 7 Asts: Buie 6 PIR: Johnson 24	Boxscore	Pts: Brazdeikis 20; Rebs: Francisco 7 Asts: Ulanovas 6 PIR: Brazdeikis 22	Arena: Twinsbet Arena; Attendance: 8,161; Referees: Gytis Vilius, Saulius Račys, Gvidas Gedvilas

== Statistics ==
=== LKL ===
Player	GP	GS	MPG	2FG%	3FG%	FT%	RPG	APG	SPG	BPG	PPG	PIR
Mantas Juzėnas	10	0	12:28	66.7%	35.3%	66.7%	1.7	0.8	0.3	0.3	4.6	4.5
Lonnie Walker IV	10	6	17:23	51.6%	54%	71.4%	2.5	1.8	0.4	0.5	12.8	12.5
Isaiah Wong	23	3	12:34	47.1%	32.6%	67.6%	1.8	1	0.4	–	6.5	4.7
Sylvain Francisco	41	20	21:40	58.6%	32.9%	80.6%	2.5	5.5	1	0.3	13.9	18.2
Lukas Lekavičius	17	1	14:43	48.9%	46.7%	92.9%	1.4	2.2	0.7	–	7.2	8.2
Ignas Brazdeikis	45	28	19:58	58.8%	41.4%	68.2%	3.1	1.8	0.5	0.2	10.3	10.4
Dovydas Giedraitis	43	20	21:10	54%	34.3%	76.9%	1.6	2.5	0.9	–	5.9	6.6
Laurynas Birutis	46	24	17:50	74.6%	–	61.7%	5	1	0.3	0.7	9.5	13.6
Ignas Štombergas	2	0	7:06	100%	–	75%	0.5	–	–	–	4.5	4
Alen Smailagić	39	24	17:22	73.4%	42.2%	80%	3.4	0.8	0.4	0.4	10.1	11.1
Matt Mitchell	42	16	15:49	61%	35.2%	71.4%	2.6	1.1	0.4	0.1	6.7	6.7
Aleksas Bieliauskas	4	0	3:37	33.3%	–	–	1	0.3	–	0.5	0.5	1.3
Dovydas Buika	13	1	11:28	45.5%	42.9%	75%	0.9	1	0.2	0.1	3.1	2.8
Mantas Laurenčikas	6	0	6:03	80%	16.7%	50%	0.5	–	0.5	–	3.3	2.7
Bryant Dunston	34	18	14:00	69.8%	33.3%	67.9%	2.9	1	0.6	0.7	5.2	7.4
Brady Manek	20	7	13:41	65.8%	40.7%	75%	2.4	1.3	0.4	0.2	6.7	6.1
Arnas Butkevičius	40	22	18:00	55.8%	36.9%	76.8%	2.8	1.6	1.3	0.4	4.9	7.7
Deividas Sirvydis	43	20	19:54	56.1%	38.8%	60.9%	3	1.7	0.7	0.2	8.6	7.7
Edgaras Ulanovas	45	17	21:14	60.7%	31.3%	83.8%	3.2	2.2	0.4	0.1	7	9.6
TOTAL				61.9%	37.9%	73.6%	35.3	20.3	6.7	3.1	90	107.8

Source: LKL

=== EuroLeague ===
Player	GP	GS	MPG	2FG%	3FG%	FT%	RPG	APG	SPG	BPG	PPG	PIR
Mantas Juzėnas	3	0	0:33	–	–	–	–	–	–	–	–	-0.7
Tyrone Wallace	2	2	11:10	44.4%	–	–	1.5	1	0.5	–	4	0
Lonnie Walker IV	19	15	22:17	45.2%	33.1%	85.7%	3.2	1.8	0.9	0.2	13.6	11.3
Isaiah Wong	7	0	12:16	48%	33.3%	85.7%	1.3	1	0.6	0.3	6.4	6
Sylvain Francisco	34	18	25:29	47.9%	34.2%	75.6%	2.6	4.5	0.9	0.4	14.6	15.6
Lukas Lekavičius	14	0	6:57	22.2%	31.6%	80%	0.3	0.5	0.2	–	2.1	-0.1
Ignas Brazdeikis	29	18	17:39	52.2%	24%	88.6%	3.2	1.4	0.3	0.1	8.2	7.6
Dovydas Giedraitis	30	18	24:00	46.8%	39.1%	78.6%	1.8	1.9	0.6	0.1	5.8	4.5
Laurynas Birutis	34	17	13:01	63.5%	–	59.6%	2.7	0.4	0.1	0.5	5.3	5.4
Alen Smailagić	29	7	15:00	67.7%	34.9%	73.5%	2.9	0.4	0.4	0.6	8.1	7.8
Matt Mitchell	29	4	14:22	44.3%	16.7%	75.9%	2.3	0.9	0.3	–	3.2	2.7
Dovydas Buika	2	0	1:18	–	–	–	–	0.5	0.5	–	–	0
Bryant Dunston	34	16	15:41	62.4%	–	63.9%	3.3	0.9	0.5	0.5	4.1	5.4
Brady Manek	24	11	8:56	43.8%	37.5%	50%	1.2	0.3	0.2	–	3.3	1.9
Arnas Butkevičius	33	17	22:00	46.5%	38%	74.3%	3.7	1.2	1	0.3	4.5	6.5
Deividas Sirvydis	34	11	16:32	51.5%	38.8%	69.1%	2.6	0.8	0.5	0.1	8.4	7
Edgaras Ulanovas	34	16	22:22	48.1%	39.4%	83.1%	2.9	1.8	0.5	0.1	6.6	8.2
TOTAL				52.2%	34.3%	75.5%	33.8	15.3	6	2.7	77.4	79.5

Source: EuroLeague
