= Paco Craig =

Paco Craig may refer to:

- Paco Craig (English footballer), (born 1992) English association football player
- Paco Craig (American football), (born 1965) American gridiron football player
