= Herman O. Ruhnau =

American Architect

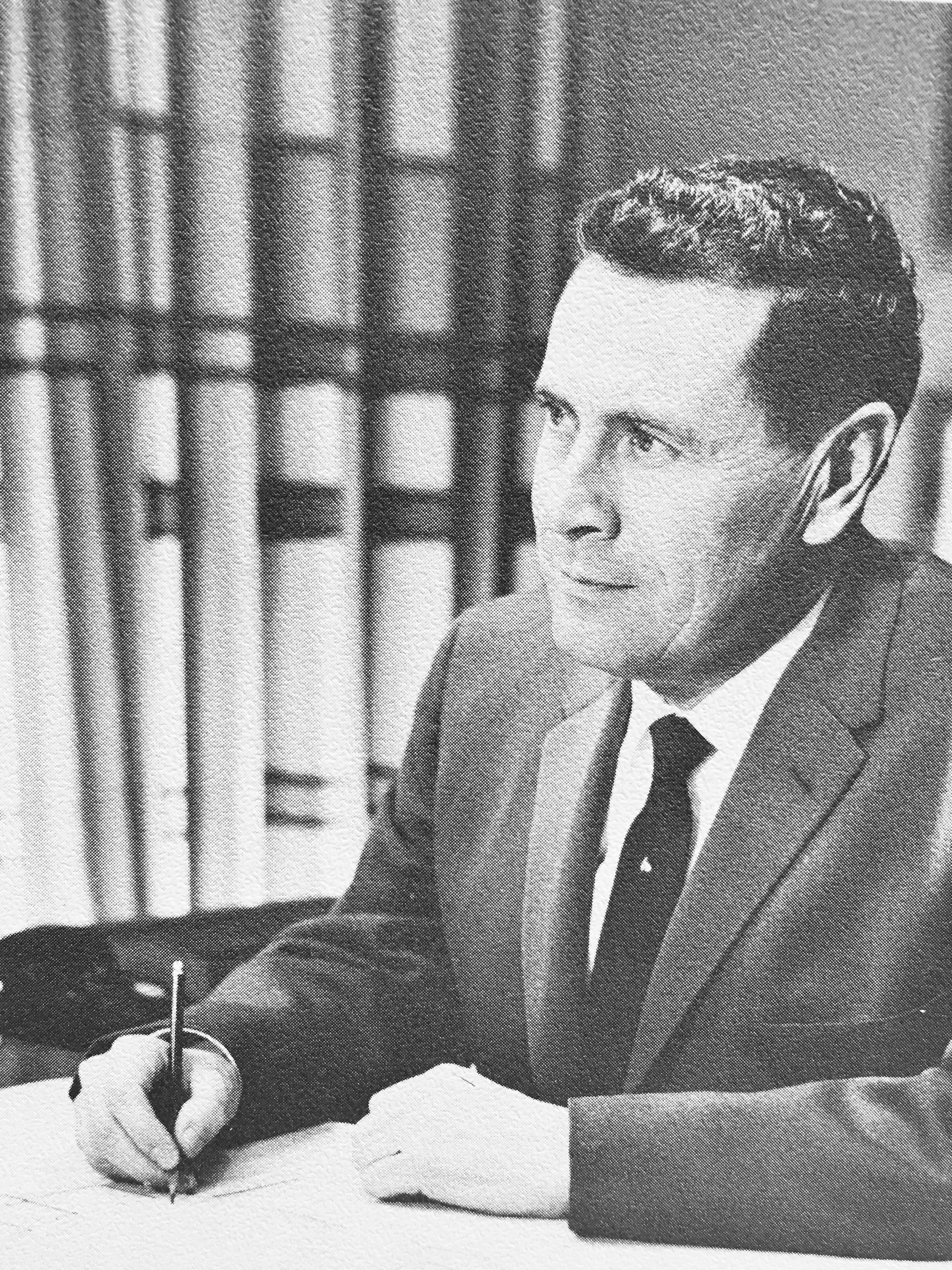
- Born: September 1, 1912; Santa Barbara, California
- Died: June 13, 2006 (aged 93); Riverside, California
- Occupation: Architect
- Awards: Lifetime achievement award from the American Institute of Architects
- Practice: Ruhnau Ruhnau Clarke
- Buildings: Riverside County Administration Building; Riverside City Hall
- Website: www.rrcarch.com

Herman O. Ruhnau (September 1, 1912 – June 10, 2007) was a Postmodern architect who founded the firm Ruhnau, Ruhnau, and Clarke. Ruhnau primarily designed buildings in Southern California, particularly the Inland Empire region.

== Biography ==
Ruhnau was the son of a German artist and was born in Santa Barbara, California, but also lived in Pasadena, California, and then Riverside, California where he graduated from Riverside's Poly High School in 1928. He studied architecture at the University of Southern California and served as an architect in the United States Navy during World War II. After the war he settled in Riverside where in 1957 he founded the architectural firm known today as Ruhnau Clarke Architects.

Ruhnau made many contributions to Southern California's Inland Empire. Since the 1950s he designed many of the region's homes, libraries, banks, schools, churches, and government facilities. Some of his most notable projects include: Riverside City Hall, Riverside County Administrative Center, Sherman Indian High School, downtown Riverside's Main Street pedestrian mall, and the Corona Naval Hospital. Ruhnau also designed a colonial-style mansion in Rubidoux in 1955 for restaurant owner and horse breeder Tiny Naylor that is now the headquarters of the Riverside County parks department.

In 1974 Ruhnau was inducted into the College of Fellows by the American Institute of Architects. He received a lifetime achievement award from the AIA Inland Chapter in April, 2006.
