= Dres Anderson =

American gridiron football player (born 1992)

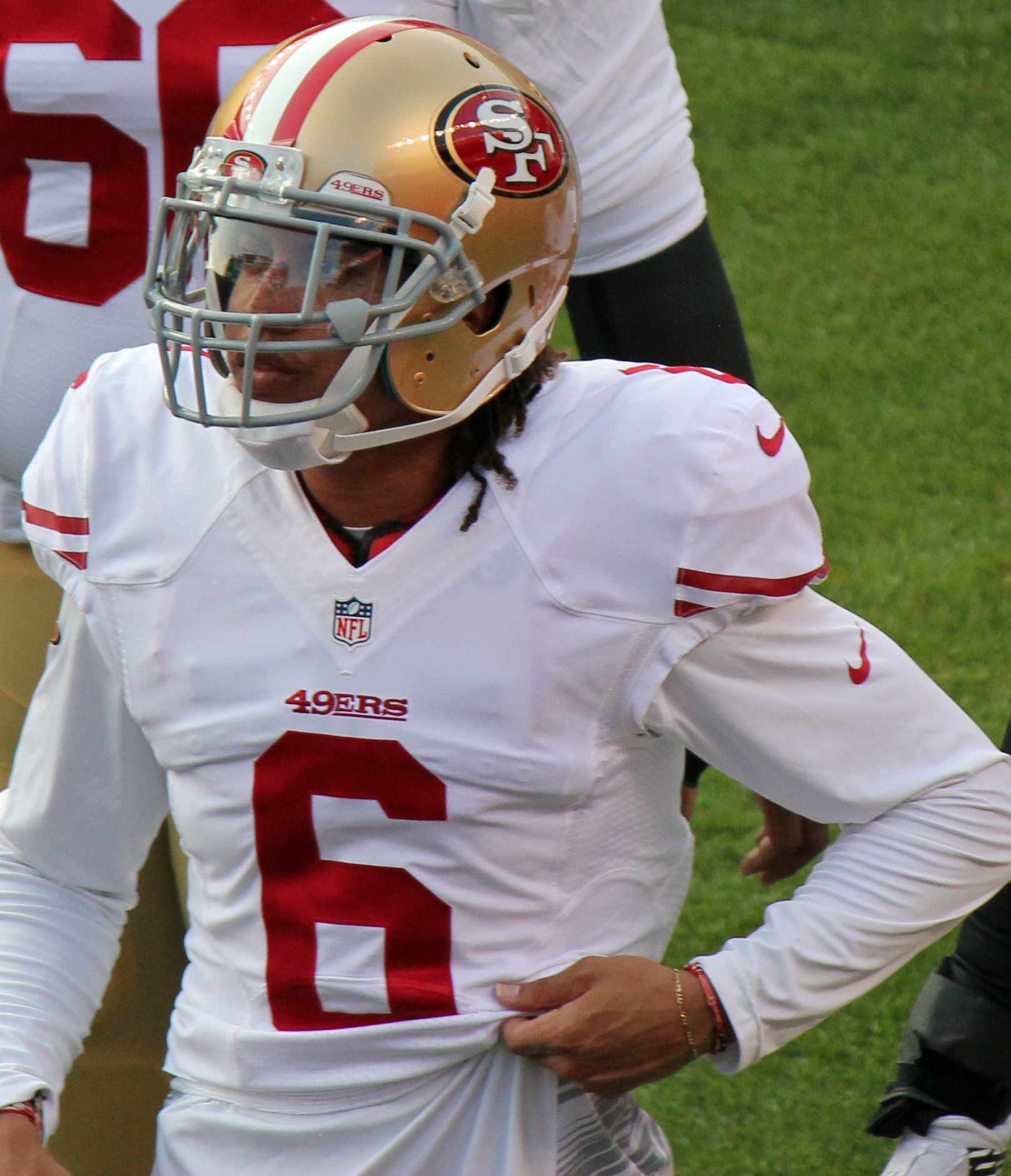
- Anderson with the San Francisco 49ers in 2015

No. 17, 6, 18
- Position: Wide receiver

Personal information
- Born: July 20, 1992 (age 34); Riverside, California, U.S.
- Listed height: 6 ft 1 in (1.85 m)
- Listed weight: 189 lb (86 kg)

Career information
- High school: John W. North (Riverside, California)
- College: Utah (2011-2014)
- NFL draft: 2015: undrafted

Career history
- San Francisco 49ers (2015–2016); Chicago Bears (2016–2017)*; Houston Texans (2017)*; Washington Redskins (2017)*; Indianapolis Colts (2017–2018)*; Dallas Cowboys (2018)*; Salt Lake Stallions (2019); Toronto Argonauts (2020–2021)
- * Offseason or practice squad member only
- Stats at Pro Football Reference

Dres Flipper Anderson (born July 20, 1992) is an American former professional football wide receiver. He played college football at the University of Utah.

== Early life ==
Anderson attended John W. North High School in Riverside, California. He was rated by Rivals.com as a three-star recruit. He committed to the University of Utah to play college football.

== College career ==
Anderson played at Utah from 2010 to 2014. After redshirting his first year, Anderson played in 44 games over the next four years. In his sophomore and junior seasons, he led the team in receiving. As a senior, he played in the first seven games before suffering a knee injury that ended his season. Anderson finished his career with 134 receptions for 2,077 yards and 17 receiving touchdowns.

== Professional career ==
Pre-draft measurables
Height	Weight	Arm length	Hand span	40-yard dash	10-yard split	20-yard split	20-yard shuttle	Three-cone drill	Broad jump	Bench press
6 ft 1 1/8 in (1.86 m)	187 lb (85 kg)	31 5/8 in (0.80 m)	9 3/8 in (0.24 m)	4.54 s	1.59 s	2.67 s	4.22 s	6.83 s	10 ft 1 in (3.07 m)	13 reps
All values from NFL Combine/Pro Day

=== San Francisco 49ers ===
Anderson was signed as an undrafted free agent by the San Francisco 49ers after the 2015 NFL draft, dropping because of concerns over his surgically repaired knee.

On September 3, 2016, Anderson was released by the 49ers, but re-signed to the team's practice squad the following day. On October 18, 2016, Anderson was released.

=== Chicago Bears ===
On November 22, 2016, Anderson was signed to the Bears' practice squad. He signed a reserve/future contract with the Bears on January 3, 2017. On May 1, 2017, Anderson was waived.

=== Houston Texans ===
On June 3, 2017, Anderson signed with the Houston Texans. He was waived on September 2, 2017.

=== Washington Redskins ===
On September 4, 2017, Anderson was signed to the Washington Redskins' practice squad. He was released by the team on September 26, 2017.

=== Indianapolis Colts ===
On November 13, 2017, Anderson was signed to the Indianapolis Colts' practice squad. He signed a reserve/future contract with the Colts on January 1, 2018. He was waived on August 12, 2018.

=== Dallas Cowboys ===
On August 15, 2018, he was signed as a free agent by the Dallas Cowboys, to provide depth during the preseason. He was waived on September 1, 2018 and was signed to the practice squad the next day. He was released on September 20, 2018.

=== Salt Lake Stallions ===
On November 9, 2018, Anderson signed with the Salt Lake Stallions of the Alliance of American Football (AAF). He was placed on injured reserve on February 19, 2019. The league ceased operations in April 2019.

=== Toronto Argonauts ===
On December 16, 2019, Anderson was signed by the Toronto Argonauts of the Canadian Football League. He did not have a chance to play with the team after the CFL announced on August 17, that the 2020 season had been cancelled due to the COVID-19 pandemic in Canada, ongoing restrictions on public gatherings, and the league's inability to secure federal funding to cover the money lost from not having fans in the stands. He signed an extension with the team on December 23, 2020. He did, however, play in four regular season games in 2021 where he had 19 catches for 117 yards. He spent part of 2022 training camp with the team, but was released after the first pre-season game on May 29, 2022.

== Personal life ==
Anderson's father, Flipper Anderson, played in the NFL from 1988 to 1997. His uncle, Paco Craig, also played one year in the NFL.
