= Matt Mitchell (basketball) =

American basketball player (born 1999)

- Mitchell with Körfez Basket in 2026

No. 11 – Biotekno Körfez Basket
- Position: Power forward / small forward
- League: Basketbol Süper Ligi

Personal information
- Born: March 18, 1999 (age 27)
- Listed height: 6 ft 6 in (1.98 m)
- Listed weight: 235 lb (107 kg)

Career information
- High school: Martin Luther King (Riverside, California); Eleanor Roosevelt (Eastvale, California)
- College: San Diego State (2017–2021)
- NBA draft: 2021: undrafted
- Playing career: 2021–present

Career history
- 2021–2023: SIG Strasbourg
- 2023–2024: Beşiktaş
- 2024–2025: Žalgiris Kaunas
- 2025–2026: Bahçeşehir Koleji
- 2026–present: Körfez Basket

Career highlights
- Lithuanian League champion (2025); King Mindaugas Cup winner (2025); Mountain West Player of the Year (2021); 2× First-team All-Mountain West (2020, 2021); Mountain West All-Defensive Team (2021)

Matthew Antonio Mitchell II (born March 18, 1999) is an American professional basketball player for Körfez Basket of the Basketbol Süper Ligi (BSL). He played college basketball for the San Diego State Aztecs.

== High school career ==
As a freshman, Mitchell helped Martin Luther King High School in Riverside, California win the CIF Southern Section Division 1A championship. After the season, he transferred to Eleanor Roosevelt High School in Eastvale, California. As a senior, Mitchell averaged 25.4 points, 9.5 rebounds, three assists and 2.2 steals per game, recording 16 double-doubles and scoring least 30 points in 10 games. He led Roosevelt to CIF State Division I, CIF Southern California Regional and Big VIII League titles. Mitchell was named HSGametime Player of the Year by The Press-Enterprise. He had success with Dream Vision on the Amateur Athletic Union circuit. Mitchell initially committed and signed a National Letter of Intent to play college basketball for Cal State Fullerton. After his senior season, he reopened his recruitment and committed to San Diego State. Mitchell was considered a three-star recruit by most recruiting services.

== College career ==
On November 20, 2017, in his fourth collegiate game, Mitchell scored a career-high 31 points, 26 of which came in the second half, in a 94–63 win over Eastern Illinois. He shot 7-of-11 from three-point range and scored the most points for a San Diego State freshman since Evan Burns in 2003. As a freshman, Mitchell averaged 10.5 points and four rebounds per game. On December 22, 2018, he scored a sophomore season-high 22 points, shooting 9-of-12 from the field, in a 90–81 victory over BYU. As a sophomore, Mitchell averaged 10.3 points and 4.1 rebounds per game. During the season, he gained about 20 pounds. In the offseason, he cut down his weight by improving his diet and spending more time in the gym. On February 1, 2020, Mitchell scored a junior season-high 28 points, including 24 in the second half, in an 80–68 win over Utah State. As a junior, he averaged 12.2 points and 4.8 rebounds per game, helping San Diego State achieve a 30–2 record. Mitchell earned first-team and second-team All-Mountain West honors in the coaches and media polls, respectively. On April 26, he declared for the 2020 NBA draft while maintaining his college eligibility. Mitchell announced he was withdrawing from the draft on August 1. On December 18, he scored a career-high 35 points in a 72–62 loss to BYU.

At the close of his senior season, Mitchell was named Mountain West Player of the Year. He averaged 15.4 points, 5.6 rebounds and 2.0 assists per game. Mitchell declared for the 2021 NBA draft and hired an agent.

== Professional career ==
After going undrafted in the 2021 NBA draft, Mitchell signed with the San Antonio Spurs for Summer League. On August 2, 2021, Mitchell signed with SIG Strasbourg of the LNB Pro A.

On July 6, 2023, Mitchell signed with Beşiktaş of the Turkish Basketbol Süper Ligi (BSL).

On June 27, 2024, Mitchell signed a two-year (1+1) contract with Žalgiris Kaunas of the Lithuanian Basketball League (LKL) and the EuroLeague. On July 11, 2025, he was released from the Lithuanian club.

On July 14, 2025, he signed with Bahçeşehir Koleji of the Turkish Basketbol Süper Ligi (BSL).

On August 12, 2026, he signed with Körfez Basket of the Basketbol Süper Ligi (BSL).

== Career statistics ==
Legend
GP	Games played	GS	Games started	MPG	Minutes per game
FG%	Field goal percentage	3P%	3-point field goal percentage	FT%	Free throw percentage
RPG	Rebounds per game	APG	Assists per game	SPG	Steals per game
BPG	Blocks per game	PPG	Points per game	**Bold**	Career high

=== College ===
Year	Team	GP	GS	MPG	FG%	3P%	FT%	RPG	APG	SPG	BPG	PPG
2017–18	San Diego State	33	32	26.5	.450	.358	.765	4.0	1.7	1.1	.2	10.5
2018–19	San Diego State	**34**	**33**	26.4	.405	.328	.755	4.1	1.8	.7	.2	10.3
2019–20	San Diego State	32	19	25.8	**.468**	**.393**	**.873**	4.8	1.7	1.1	**.3**	12.2
2020–21	San Diego State	25	24	**29.8**	.436	.337	.809	**5.6**	**2.0**	**1.4**	.2	**15.4**
Career		124	108	27.0	.439	.354	.804	4.5	1.8	1.0	.3	11.9
