= Martin Luther King High School (Riverside, California) =

Public high school in Riverside, California

Location
- 9301 Wood Road; Riverside, California 92508; United States; 33°53′N 117°20′W

Information
- Type: Comprehensive Public High School
- Motto: The strength of the pack is the wolf, and the strength of the wolf is the pack.
- Established: 1999
- School district: Riverside Unified School District
- Superintendent: Sonia Llamas
- CEEB code: 052567
- Principal: Leann Iacuone
- Staff: 119.60 (FTE)
- Grades: 9-12
- Enrollment: 2,800 (2023-24)
- Student to teacher ratio: 25.68
- Campus size: 55 acres (22 ha)
- Colors: Navy; Scarlet; Silver
- Athletics conference: CIF-Southern Section Big VIII League
- Mascot: Wolf
- Nickname: Wolves
- Accreditation: Western Association of Schools and Colleges
- Newspaper: The King Courier
- Feeder schools: Amelia Earhart Middle School, Frank Augustus Miller Middle School
- Website: king.riversideunified.org

Martin Luther King High School, also known as King High School, is a 4-year public high school in Riverside, California.

== Background ==
Martin Luther King High School opened in 1999 and was the first high school to be built in Riverside, California since Arlington High School’s opening in 1973. The first year enrollment was 858 students in grades 9 and 10. Martin Luther King High School added grade 11 in 2000 and grade 12 in 2001. Its first class graduated in 2002. Its first four-year class (students who attended Martin Luther King High School for all four years of their high school career) graduated in 2003.

== Demographics ==
In 2022, the student body was 40 percent hispanic, 36 percent white, 11.5 percent Asian and 7.5 percent black. The student body scored above district and state averages on assessments.

== Advanced Placement ==
The following Advanced Placement (AP) classes are offered:

- AP African American Studies
- AP Biology
- AP Calculus AB
- AP Calculus BC
- AP Chemistry
- AP Computer Science Principles
- AP English Language
- AP English Literature
- AP European History
- AP Environmental Science
- AP Physics 1
- AP Physics 2
- AP Psychology
- AP Spanish
- AP Statistics
- AP United States History
- AP U.S. Government & Politics

== Notable alumni ==
- Emily Ausmus (born 2005), water polo player for the United States national water polo team; competed at the 2024 Summer Olympics
- Carlon Brown (born 1989), basketball player, 2013-14 top scorer in the Israel Basketball Premier League
- Ciara Hanna (born 1991), actress
- Kawhi Leonard (born 1991), NBA player for the Toronto Raptors
- Robert Malone (born 1988), former NFL punter
- Mason Murphy (born 2002), NFL player for the New Orleans Saints
- Tony Snell (born 1991), LNB Pro A player for Cholet Basket
