= Ramona High School (Riverside, California) =

Public high school in California, United States

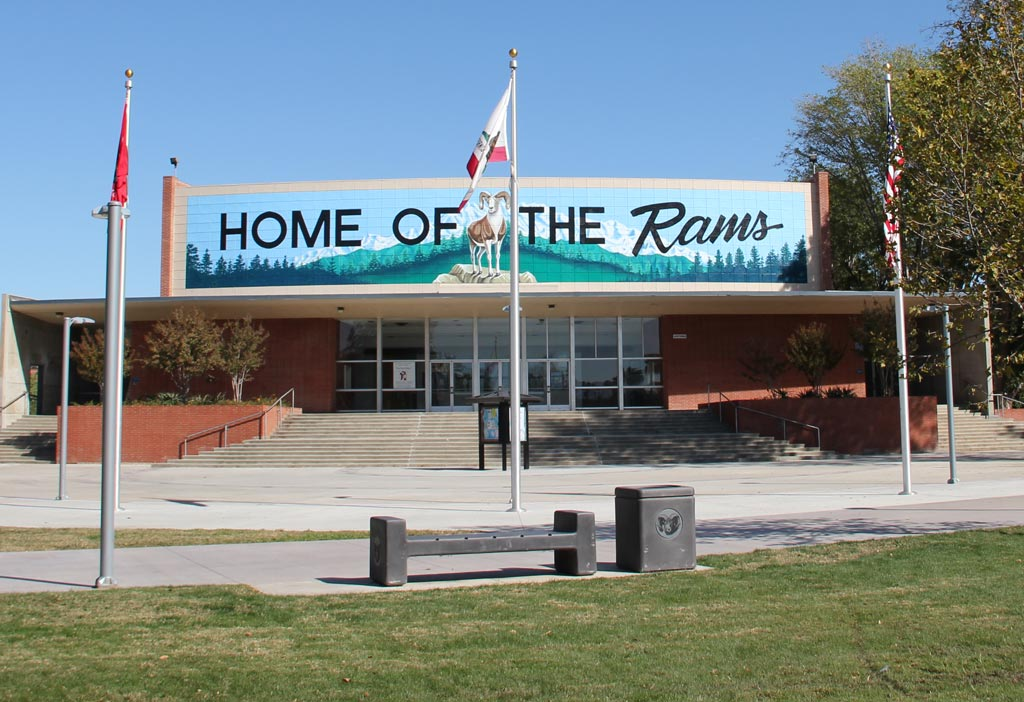

Location
- 7675 Magnolia Avenue; Riverside, California 92504; United States; 33°56′28″N 117°24′50″W

Information
- Type: Public
- Opened: 1956
- School district: Riverside Unified School District
- Superintendent: Sonia Llamas
- Principal: Victor Cisneros
- Staff: 94.99 (FTE)
- Grades: 9-12
- Enrollment: 2,190 (2023-2024)
- Student to teacher ratio: 23.06
- Campus size: 55 arces (22 ha)
- Colors: Columbia blue, navy, and white
- Athletics conference: CIF River Valley League
- Mascot: Ram
- Nickname: Rams
- Rival: Arlington High School, Riverside Poly
- Newspaper: The Rampage
- Feeder schools: Chemawa Middle School, Sierra Middle School
- Website: Official website

Ramona High School is a high school in Riverside, California, United States, part of the Riverside Unified School District. Ramona graduated its first class of students in 1958. Ramona has been designated as a "National Demonstration School" for the AVID Program.

== Institution ==
Ramona's feeder middle schools are Chemawa Middle School and Sierra Middle School. Riverside Polytechnic High School (1887), Ramona, and John W. North High School (1965) are the three oldest high schools in the Riverside Unified School District. The Ramona High school stadium underwent extensive remodeling and was re-opened in 2010.

== Ramona Creative and Performing Arts (RCAPA) ==
Ramona's Creative and Performing Arts magnet program provides visual, creative, and performing arts classes to more than 1,200 students on their campus and comprises the largest elective department at Ramona.

== Sports ==
- Girls: Swimming, Water Polo, Tennis, Basketball, Soccer, Golf, Cross Country, Track, Softball, Volleyball, Cheerleading, Stunt, Flag Football
- Boys: Football, Baseball, Swimming, Water Polo, Tennis, Basketball, Soccer, Golf, Cross Country, Wrestling, Track, Volleyball

== Notable alumni ==
- Cheri Jo Bates
- Michael L. Coats, NASA astronaut
- Paco Craig, NFL football player
- Marc Danzeisen, musician, producer, actor
- Tom Hall, Major League Baseball pitcher
- Gary McCord, golfer, PGA Tour
- Darrell Miller, MLB catcher
- Eric Show, MLB pitcher
- Ron Tingley, MLB catcher
- Andre Ewell, professional MMA fighter
- Brett Rossi, model, adult actress
- Mark Warkentien, NBA executive
- Ivan Cornejo, singer
