= Deividas Sirvydis =

Lithuanian basketball player (born 2000)

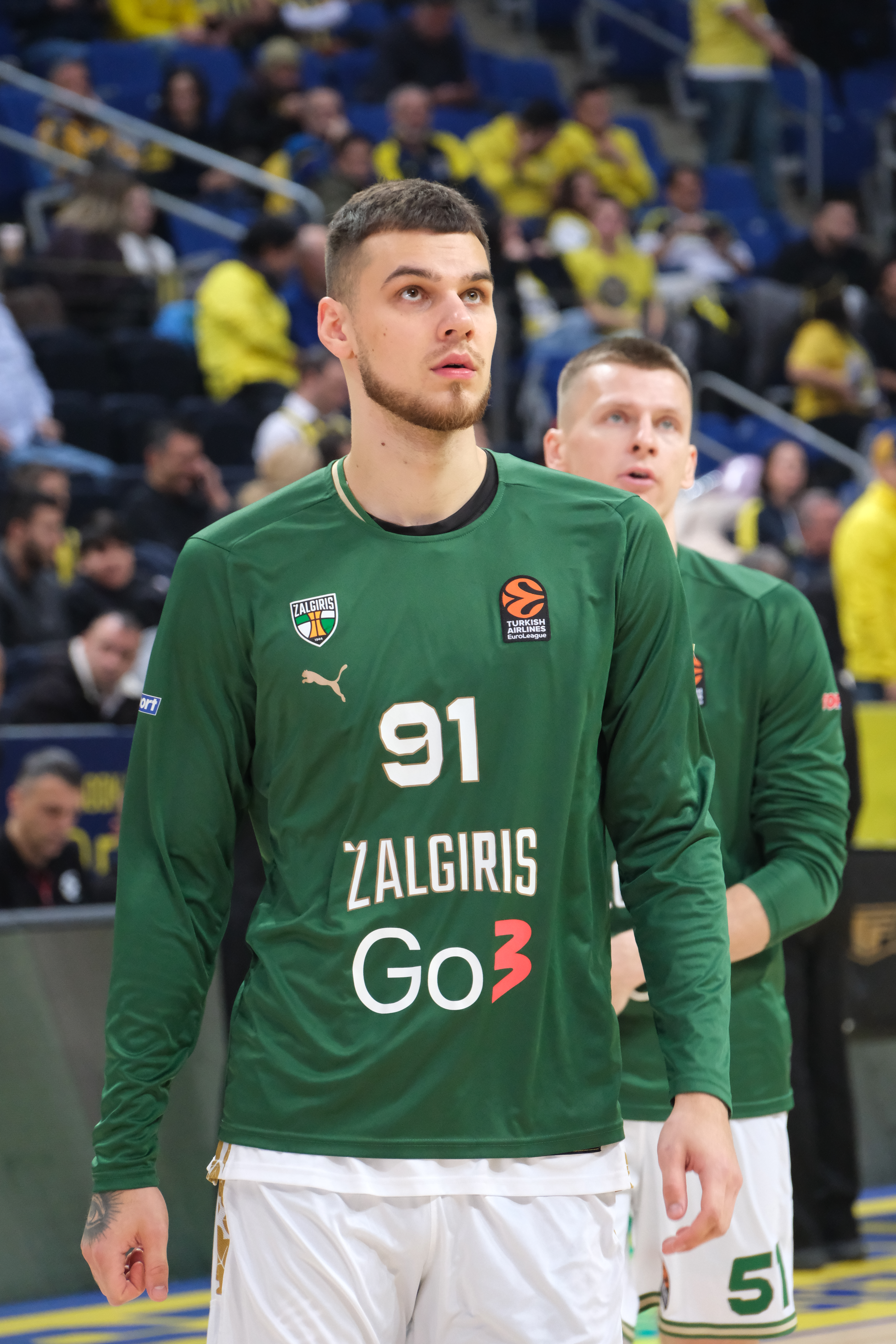
- Sirvydis with Žalgiris Kaunas in 2025

No. 91 – Žalgiris Kaunas
- Position: Shooting guard / small forward
- League: LKL; EuroLeague

Personal information
- Born: 10 June 2000 (age 26) Vilnius, Lithuania
- Listed height: 6 ft 9 in (2.06 m)
- Listed weight: 207 lb (94 kg)

Career information
- NBA draft: 2019: 2nd round, 37th overall pick
- Drafted by: Dallas Mavericks
- Playing career: 2017–present

Career history
- 2017–2020: Rytas Vilnius
- 2017–2018: →Perlas
- 2020: Hapoel Jerusalem
- 2020–2022: Detroit Pistons
- 2021–2022: →Motor City Cruise
- 2022–2023: Fort Wayne Mad Ants
- 2023: Wisconsin Herd
- 2023–2024: Lietkabelis Panevėžys
- 2024–present: Žalgiris Kaunas

Career highlights
- EuroCup Top Scorer (2024); All-EuroCup Second Team (2024); All-LKL Team (2024); 3× King Mindaugas Cup winner (2019, 2025, 2026); 2× LΚL champion (2025, 2026); Next Generation Tournament MVP (2018)
- Stats at NBA.com
- Stats at Basketball Reference

Deividas Sirvydis (born 10 June 2000) is a Lithuanian professional basketball player for Žalgiris Kaunas of the Lithuanian Basketball League (LKL) and the EuroLeague. Sirvydis was selected 37th overall by the Dallas Mavericks in the 2019 NBA draft and was then traded to the Detroit Pistons.

== Early life and youth career ==
Sirvydis spent his childhood in various European countries because of his father's professional basketball career. He lived for three years in Russia, two years in Germany, one year in the Czech Republic, and one year in Cyprus. Sirvydis often practiced basketball after his father's games but did not seriously start playing the sport until he was about seven years old.

In May 2018, Sirvydis won the 2017–18 Adidas Next Generation Tournament with the Rytas Vilnius U18 team and was named most valuable player after recording 18 points, 6 rebounds and 3 assists in the title game against Stella Azzurra Rome under-18 team.

== Professional career ==
=== Rytas Vilnius (2017–2020) ===
Sirvydis made his Lithuanian Basketball League (LKL) debut with Rytas Vilnius on 29 May 2017, at age 16, and passed Jonas Valančiūnas as the youngest player in club history to play in the league. On 5 December, he became the youngest Lietuvos rytas player to appear in a EuroCup game, overtaking Valančiūnas again. In the 2019–20 season, Sirvydis averaged 6.6 points and 2.8 rebounds for Rytas in EuroCup play. He averaged 5.7 points and 2.5 rebounds per game in the LKL.

=== Hapoel Jerusalem (2020) ===
On 23 May 2020, Sirvydis signed a long-term contract with Hapoel Jerusalem of the Israeli Basketball Premier League. He left the team on 16 November to join the Detroit Pistons for training camp.

=== Detroit Pistons / Motor City Cruise (2020–2022) ===
In the 2019 NBA draft, Sirvydis was selected 37th overall by the Dallas Mavericks, but was immediately traded to the Detroit Pistons in exchange for Isaiah Roby and two future second-round picks. He represented the Pistons at 2019 NBA Summer League.

On 1 December 2020, Sirvydis signed a three-year contract with the Detroit Pistons. On 6 January 2021, Sirvydis made his the National Basketball Association (NBA) debut in a game against the Milwaukee Bucks. On 3 March, Sirvydis scored his first NBA point in the Pistons' 129–105 win over the Toronto Raptors. On 14 May, Sirvydis scored a career high of 16 points in a loss against the Denver Nuggets. On 31 July, Sirvydis was waived by the Pistons. On 28 September, he re-signed with the Pistons, but was waived the next day.

On 25 October 2021, Sirvydis signed with the Motor City Cruise of the NBA G League.

On 26 December 2021, the Pistons signed Sirvydis to a 10-day contract. Sirvydis was assigned to the Cruise on 5 January 2022.

After his 10-day contract with the Pistons expired, Sirvydis returned to the Cruise. On February 17, 2022, Sirvydis set the Motor City Cruise record for Most 3-pointers made in a single game when he made 7 of his 14 attempts and had totals of 25 points and 7 rebounds as the Cruise defeated the Fort Wayne Mad Ants 132 - 120.

Sirvydis joined the New Orleans Pelicans for the 2022 NBA Summer League. On 18 August 2022, he signed with the Indiana Pacers. On 22 October, the Pacers waived Sirvydis before the beginning of the regular season.

=== Fort Wayne Mad Ants (2022–2023) ===
On 24 October 2022, Sirvydis joined the Fort Wayne Mad Ants training camp roster.

=== Wisconsin Herd (2023) ===
On 24 February 2023, Sirvydis was traded to the Wisconsin Herd in exchange for Jordan Bone.

=== Lietkabelis Panevėžys (2023–2024) ===
On 3 August 2023, Sirvydis returned to Europe, signing with 7bet-Lietkabelis Panevėžys of the Lithuanian Basketball League (LKL) and the EuroCup. The contract included EuroLeague and NBA opt-out clauses. In the 2023–24 EuroCup season he became the highest average scoring player in the league, averaging 18.9 points.

=== Žalgiris Kaunas (2024–present) ===
On 18 June 2024, Sirvydis signed a three-year (2+1) deal with Žalgiris Kaunas of the Lithuanian Basketball League (LKL) and the EuroLeague.

On 2 June 2025, Sirvydis and Žalgiris agreed to a contract extension that runs through the 2027–28 season.

== Career statistics ==
Legend
GP	Games played	GS	Games started	MPG	Minutes per game
FG%	Field goal percentage	3P%	3-point field goal percentage	FT%	Free throw percentage
RPG	Rebounds per game	APG	Assists per game	SPG	Steals per game
BPG	Blocks per game	PPG	Points per game	**Bold**	Career high

=== Regular season ===
Year	Team	GP	GS	MPG	FG%	3P%	FT%	RPG	APG	SPG	BPG	PPG
2020–21	Detroit	**20**	0	6.7	**.350**	**.357**	**.500**	1.5	**.3**	.1	.0	**2.1**
2021–22	Detroit	3	0	**9.0**	.100	.143	—	**2.0**	**.3**	**1.0**	**.3**	1.0
Career		23	0	7.0	.300	.314	.500	1.5	.3	.2	.0	1.9

=== EuroLeague ===
Year	Team	GP	GS	MPG	FG%	3P%	FT%	RPG	APG	SPG	BPG	PPG	PIR
2024-25	Žalgiris	34	11	16.5	.427	.388	.691	2.6	.8	.5	.1	8.4	7.0
Career		34	11	16.5	.427	.388	.691	2.6	.8	.5	.1	8.4	7.0

=== EuroCup ===
Year	Team	GP	GS	MPG	FG%	3P%	FT%	RPG	APG	SPG	BPG	PPG	PIR
2017–18	Rytas Vilnius	2	0	2.5	**.0**	**.0**	**.0**	**.0**	.0	.0	**.0**	.0	-0.5
2018–19	Rytas Vilnius	17	11	13.7	.484	**.463**	.765	1.9	.1	.1	.0	5.4	5.4
2019–20	Rytas Vilnius	16	4	15.0	.439	.382	**.867**	2.8	.7	.3	.0	6.6	6.2
2023–24	Lietkabelis	**16**	**15**	**31.1**	**.508**	.423	.831	**4.4**	**2.6**	**.9**	.0	**18.9**	**17.8**
Career		51	30	19.2	.508	.420	.826	2.2	.8	.3	.0	9.8	8.9

== Personal life ==
Sirvydis is the son of Virginijus Sirvydis, a former professional basketball player who played in many European countries, winning the North European Basketball League championship in 2001 with Russian club Ural Great Perm. In 2012, Virginijus began his coaching career as an assistant for LKL club Sakalai Vilnius.
