= Mel Streeter =

American architect and basketball player

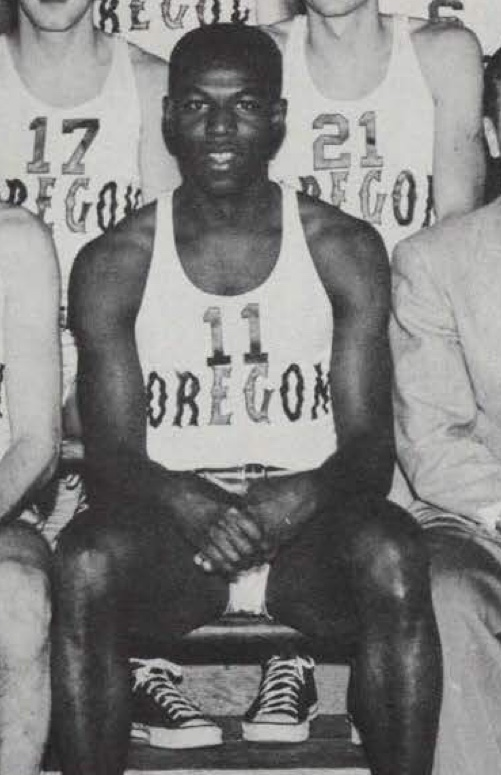
- Streeter in the 1952 Oregana

Personal information
- Born: 1931
- Died: June 16, 2006 (aged 74–75)
- Listed height: 6 ft 4 in (1.93 m)

Career information
- High school: Riverside Poly (Riverside, California)
- College: Oregon (1949–1952)
- Number: 11

Mel Streeter (1931 – June 12, 2006) was an American architect and college basketball player. A native of Riverside, California, he was the second African-American basketball player at the University of Oregon for the Ducks in the early 1950s. After serving as an officer in the U.S. Army, he moved to Seattle and founded an architecture firm.

== Life ==
=== Early life ===
Streeter was born in 1931 and grew up in Riverside, California, the son of a porter and a cook.

=== Education ===
Streeter attended Riverside Polytechnic High School in California where he played basketball. After high school he was offered a spot on the basketball team at UCLA, but declined because he wanted to study architecture. He attended the University of Oregon on an Army scholarship and was the second African-American on the Ducks basketball team and the only African-American player at the time. He graduated in 1955 with an architecture degree.

=== Later life ===
In 1954, he married Kathleen Burgess, in one of the first legal mixed-race marriages in Oregon. The couple had four sons — Doug, Kurt, Jon, and Ken. Streeter suffered from amyloidoisis the last five years of his life.

=== Career ===
After graduation Steeter was stationed in the Army at Fort Lawton and lived in Seattle's Magnolia neighborhood from 1955 to 1957. After leaving the Army in 1957, he stayed in Seattle and began working as an architect. He applied to 22 firms before finding one that would hire an African American. He later opened his own firm in 1967, which eventually grew to 30 architects before the partners split. Streeter served on Seattle's planning commission between 1989 and 2000.

=== Legacy ===
On August 3, 2006, Washington Senator Maria Cantwell addressed the President and Congress in a tribute to Mel Streeter. She said, "Mr. President, earlier this summer, Seattle lost one of its most impressive and inspiring leaders. As an outstanding architect and an extraordinary man, Mel Streeter left his mark on our community and changed the lives of so many .... As one of the first African-American architects to lead a Seattle firm, Mel broke down barriers and created new opportunities for others who followed."

== Work ==
=== Projects ===
- African American Academy, Seattle
- Auburn City Hall, Auburn, Washington
- Federal Aviation Administration Regional Headquarters at Boeing Field, Seattle
- Naval Station Everett, Everett, Washington
- John Muir Elementary School, Seattle Seattle Seahawks Centurylink Stadium, Seattle Sept-Oct 1998/>
