= Darrell Miller =

American baseball player (born 1958)

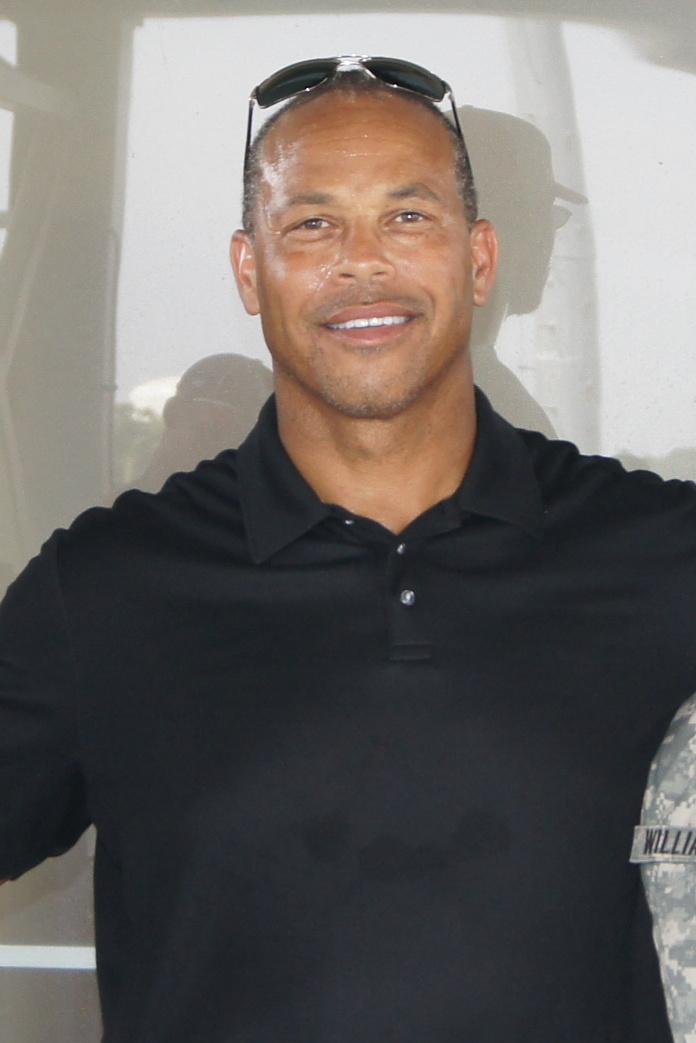
- Miller at Durham Bulls Athletic Park in 2011
- Catcher / Outfielder
- Born: February 26, 1958 (age 67); Washington, D.C., U.S.
- Batted: Right Threw: Right

MLB debut
- August 14, 1984, for the California Angels

Last MLB appearance
- October 1, 1988, for the California Angels

MLB statistics
- Batting average: .241
- Home runs: 8
- Runs batted in: 35
- Stats at Baseball Reference

Teams
- California Angels (1984–1988)

Darrell Keith Miller Sr. (born February 26, 1958) is an American former professional baseball player. While with the California Angels, he was a catcher and outfielder, playing from 1984 to 1988. He is also a Catholic deacon, the first African American ordained in the Diocese of Orange.

As of 2021, he serves as the director of Major League Baseball's Urban Youth Academy, located in Compton, California.

== Career ==
Before being drafted to the Major League Baseball (MLB), he played three seasons at California State Polytechnic University in Pomona, California.

He played his entire career for the California Angels, the team that drafted him in the 9th round of the 1979 Major League Baseball draft. He played in 224 career MLB games, batting .241 with 13 doubles, 8 home runs, and 35 runs batted in, in 394 at-bats.

As a member of the team in 1986, the Angels advanced to the American League Championship Series, losing to the Boston Red Sox.

== Personal life ==
Miller is the brother of Basketball Hall of Fame members Cheryl Miller and Reggie Miller. He attended Ramona High School in Riverside, California in the mid 1970s. He is married to Kelly Miller and has three children; Darrell Jr., Nicole and Cameron.

Miller converted to Catholicism after unsuccessfully attempting to convert Kelly to his former Baptist faith. He became a Catholic deacon in October 2021, the first African American ordained to that office in the Diocese of Orange.
