= Riverside Polytechnic High School =

Coordinates: 33°57′06″N 117°22′09″W

- 5450 Victoria Avenue; Riverside, California; United States

Information
- Type: Public
- Established: 1887
- Status: Open
- School district: Riverside Unified School District
- Superintendent: Sonia Llamas
- Principal: Steven Ybarra
- Staff: 103.03 (FTE)
- Grades: 9–12
- Enrollment: 2,633 (2023–2024)
- Student to teacher ratio: 25.82
- Campus size: 40 acres (16 ha)
- Color: Orange Green
- Athletics conference: CIF Southern Section; Inland Valley League
- Mascot: Bear
- Nickname: Bears
- Rival: Arlington High School, Ramona High School
- Accreditation: Western Association of Schools and Colleges, 2009
- CAHSEE average: 61.4 English-Language Arts; 59.1 Mathematics
- Newspaper: The Poly Spotlight
- Feeder schools: Matthew Gage Middle School, Central Middle School
- Website: poly.riversideunified.org

Riverside Polytechnic High School is a four-year public high school in Riverside, California, United States, and part of the Riverside Unified School District. The current facility, located on Victoria Avenue, was opened in September 1965; the traditions of the school go back to 1887, then known as the Riverside High School, making Riverside Polytechnic the oldest high school in the city.

== History ==
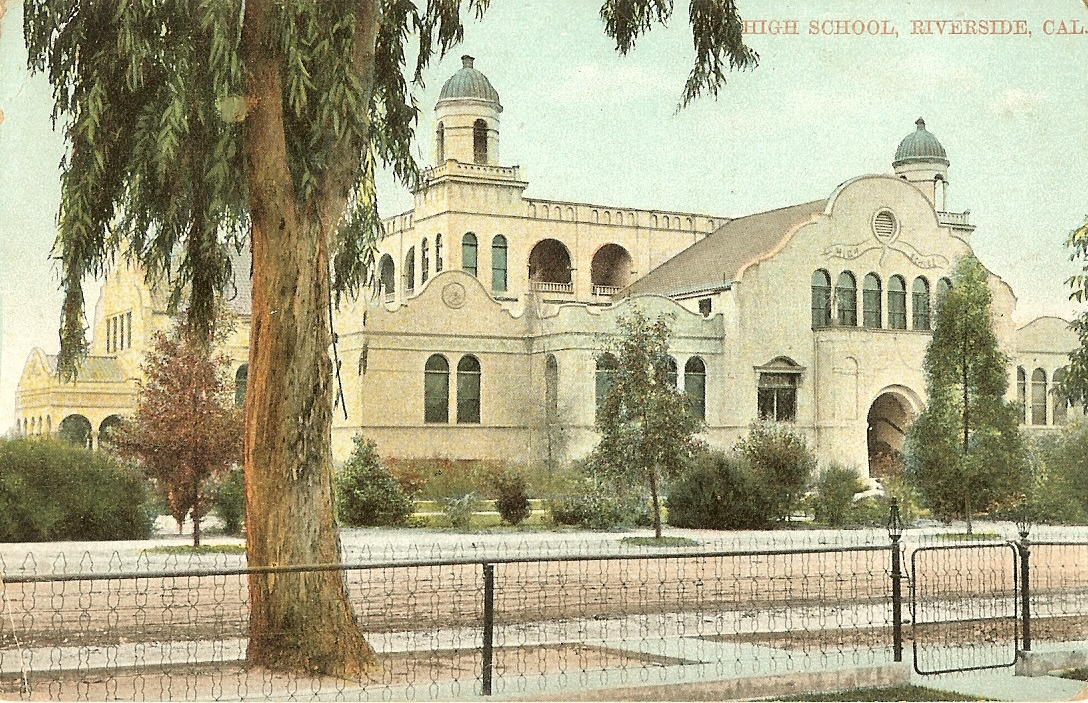
Girls High School in Riverside, California, c. 1915

Riverside Polytechnic High School traces its heritage from 1887, when the newly formed city of Riverside needed higher education for the community. The first joint elementary and high school's first graduating class in 1890 comprised seven students—four girls and three boys. Eugenie Fuller was its principal. When classes grew too large in 1902, a new co-educational high school building was constructed on Ninth Street between Lemon and Lime Streets, and the original 14th Street building became the Grant School, serving grades 3–8.

In 1910, Riverside High School's enrollment was approximately 500 students, and new facilities were required. In 1911, the genders were separated, creating a Girls High School at the Ninth Street building, and the Polytechnic High School for boys at a newly constructed campus on Terracina Avenue. Fuller continued as principal of the Girls High School, and Mr. J.E. McKown was appointed principal of the Riverside Polytechnic High School.

In 1916, the Polytechnic High School began offering postgraduate classes. The Riverside Junior College District was formed in 1920, and the Riverside Junior College moved out of the high school to an adjacent property.

World War I brought changes to both high school campuses. The earlier enrollment explosion waned as young men joined the armed forces. In 1924, the school board created a junior high school level and consolidated the senior high schools into one co-educational school. A new Applied Arts Building provided Home Economics and "other facilities for the girls." The old Girls High School now served as a Girls Junior High School, while the Boys Junior High School was located at the old Grant School. 1924–25 saw the Junior College and the Senior High School with growing enrollments, and so provided separate administrations for each. There were 202 seniors in 1924.

During World War II, many Poly girls worked with a federal government–sponsored group called the High School Victory Corps. The girls helped make bandages and other needed items, or worked in essential industries after school. All who took part in these activities were volunteers. In 1944, the Victory Corps was discontinued at Poly.

In the 1940s, there was a tradition that each incoming class at the school would be given an unflattering nickname that would remain with the class until their graduation. For example, the class of 1951 was dubbed the "Geeks" and the class of 1953 was the "Orts".

In 1956, double sessions at Poly were needed until a second high school, Ramona High, could be built. As high school enrollment continued to grow, it was evident that a third high school would be needed in Riverside. In 1960, a new high school, Rubidoux, shared the Poly campus until its campus could be completed in 1961. In 1965, Poly separated from the junior college campus and a site on the corner of Central and Victoria Avenues was built, along with a high school on Third Street and Chicago Avenue, named North High. Both high schools opened their doors in September 1965, with the Victoria site keeping the traditional name of Riverside Polytechnic High School. Since that time, Poly High School classes have taken place on the present site.

Riverside Polytechnic High School is home to one of the original, still active Army Junior Reserve Officers' Training Corps (JROTC) units, established in 1917 and was originally called the Poly High Cadet Corps. It is the oldest JROTC program west of the Mississippi River, and second oldest in the United States. In 1970 it was among the first JROTC units to offer a girls program.

There were 51 young men making up the Class of 1916, known as the "Stags of 1916". There were 18 faculty members. This class was the first to complete the four-year course offered in the new building.

== Notable alumni ==
Alumnus	Class	Field	Notability
Members of The Misunderstood (George Phelps, Rick Moe, Greg Treadway, Rick Brown, Steve Whiting, Glenn Ross Campbell)	1964 (est)	Music	One of the earliest bands on the psychedelic rock scene of the 1960s. Moved to London very early in career, forced to disband due to Brown's draft notice.
Neil LeVang	1945 (est)	Music	Guitarist most well known for song "Ghost Riders in the Sky" performed on The Lawrence Welk Show, along with 42 other titles featured in Hollywood films.
Hakim Akbar	1998	Sports	Football linebacker drafted by the New England Patriots
Austin Barnes	2008	Sports	Major League Baseball (MLB) player, Los Angeles Dodgers, 2020 and 2024 World Series Champion
Bobby Bonds	1964	Sports	Major League Baseball (MLB) player, 3-time All-Star
Lamont Butler	2020	Sports	Basketball player
Larry Christiansen	1974	Sports	Chess Grandmaster, US chess champion 1980, 1983, 2002 First junior high school student to win the National High School Championship.
Tyler Clary	2007	Sports	Swimmer who won silver medal at 2009 World Aquatics Championships, three silvers at 2010 Pan Pacific Swimming Championships and gold medal in 2012 London Olympics.
Marcella Craft	1893	Music	International operatic soprano
Coby Dietrick	1967	Sports	Professional basketball
John Gabbert	1927	Law	Associate Justice of the California Court of Appeals
Walter A. Gordon	1914 (est)	Government	First All-American at UC Berkeley, first African American graduate of Boalt Hall, Governor of the U.S. Virgin Islands, Federal District Judge
Sharon Jordan	1978	Film and TV	Actress, recurring role on Disney's The Suite Life of Zack & Cody
Lorenz Larkin	2004	Sports	Wrestler and MMA fighter
Ben H. Lewis	1921 (est)	Government	Mayor of Riverside from 1965 to 1978
Jake Marisnick	2009	Sports	Major League Baseball (MLB) player, Houston Astros, 2017 World Series Champion
Cloyd Marvin	1908 (est)	Education	president of George Washington University
Rex Mays	1931 (est)	Sports	Auto racer, 1940 and 1941 national champion, four-time pole winner at Indianapolis 500, member Motorsports Hall of Fame of America, National Sprint Car Hall of Fame, Riverside Sports Hall of Fame
Cheryl Miller	1982	Sports	USC basketball player, College Basketball Hall of Fame inductee, WNBA coach, and commentator
Reggie Miller	1983	Sports	UCLA and NBA player, Olympic gold medalist, Basketball Hall of Famer, commentator
Donnie Murphy	2001	Sports	MLB player
Greg Myers	1984	Sports	MLB player
Paul Oglesby	1956	Sports	Football player
Bill Parsons	1966	Sports	Former Major League Baseball pitcher for Milwaukee Brewers and Oakland Athletics
Miné Okubo	1930 (est)	Arts	Artist and writer
Lauren Potter	2010	TV and government	Actress, played Becky Johnson, a cheerleader with Down syndrome, on TV series Glee. In 2011, she was appointed by President Obama to the President's Committee for People with Intellectual Disabilities.
Jo-Jo Reyes	2003	Sports	MLB pitcher
Bob Rule	1962 (est)	Sports	NBA All-Star center
Herman O. Ruhnau	1928	Architecture	Postmodern architect
William F. Sharpe	1951	Economics	Winner of 1990 Nobel Memorial Prize in Economic Sciences, helped develop Capital asset pricing model, part of Modern portfolio theory. Also known for Sharpe ratio.
Mel Streeter	1950	Sports	College basketball player and Seattle architect.
Jacob Webb	2012	Sports	Professional baseball pitcher for the Atlanta Braves, Los Angeles Angels, and Baltimore Orioles
Ray Lyman Wilbur	1892	Government	Medical doctor, Stanford University president, 31st United States Secretary of the Interior
Bert Williams	1892	Vaudeville	"Foremost Colored Comedian"
Cynthia Woodhead	1982	Sports	1978 world champion swimmer; 1984 Olympic silver medalist in 200m freestyle
Alan Yang	1999	Film and TV	Screenwriter, producer, director known for Parks and Recreation, Master of None

== Notable instructors ==
- Edmund Jaeger – noted naturalist, his first zoology class in 1921 had three students
