= Riverside Unified School District =

Public school district in Riverside County, California

Address
- 3380 14th Street Riverside, California, 92501; United States
- Coordinates: 33°58′27″N 117°22′28″W

District information
- Type: Public
- Grades: K–12
- Superintendent: Sonia Llamas
- NCES District ID: 0633150

Students and staff
- Students: 39,443 (2020–2021)
- Teachers: 1,634.76 (FTE)
- Staff: 1,915.81 (FTE)
- Student–teacher ratio: 24.13:1

Other information
- Website: www.riversideunified.org

Riverside Unified School District (a.k.a. RUSD) is a school district headquartered in Riverside, California, United States. The district serves a large portion of Riverside as well as Highgrove, Woodcrest, and the eastern half of El Sobrante, unincorporated areas in Riverside County.

== Elementary schools ==
- Adams
- Alcott
- Patricia Beatty
- Bryant
- Casa Blanca Elementary
- Castle View
- Emerson
- Benjamin Franklin
- Fremont
- Harada
- Benjamin Harrison
- Hawthorne
- Highgrove
- Jackson
- Jefferson
- John F. Kennedy
- Lake Mathews
- Liberty
- Longfellow
- Madison
- Magnolia
- Mark Twain
- Monroe
- Mountain View
- Pachappa
- Tomas Rivera
- Sunshine
- William H. Taft
- Victoria
- Washington
- Woodcrest
- Riverside STEM Academy (5th through 12th)

== Middle schools ==
- Central
- Chemawa
- Amelia Earhart
- Frank Augustus Miller Middle School
- Matthew Gage
- Sierra
- University Heights
- Riverside STEM Academy (5th through 12th)

== High schools ==
- Abraham Lincoln (Continuation)
- Arlington
- John W. North (North)
- Martin Luther King (King)
- Raincross (EOC)
- Ramona
- Riverside Polytechnic (Poly)
- Summit View (EOC)
- Riverside STEM High School

== Virtual schools ==
- Riverside Virtual School (1st through 12th)(EOC)

== Adult schools ==
- Project TEAM
- Riverside Adult School
