= Paco Craig (American football) =

American football player (born 1965)

No. 41, 87
- Position: Wide receiver

Personal information
- Born: February 2, 1965 (age 61); Santa Maria, California, U.S.
- Listed height: 5 ft 10 in (1.78 m)
- Listed weight: 173 lb (78 kg)

Career information
- High school: Ramona (Riverside, California)
- College: UCLA (1984–1987)
- NFL draft: 1988: 10th round, 254th overall pick

Career history
- Detroit Lions (1988); Atlanta Falcons (1989)*; Toronto Argonauts (1989); Los Angeles Rams (1990)*; Sacramento Surge (1991)
- * Offseason or practice squad member only

Career NFL statistics
- Receptions: 2
- Receiving yards: 29
- Stats at Pro Football Reference

Francisco Luis Craig (February 2, 1965) is an American former professional football player who was a wide receiver for one season with the Detroit Lions of the National Football League (NFL). He was selected by the Lions in the tenth round of the 1988 NFL draft after playing college football for the UCLA Bruins. Craig also played for the Toronto Argonauts and Sacramento Surge.

== Early life and college ==
Francisco Luis Craig was born on February 2, 1965, in Santa Maria, California. He attended Ramona High School in Riverside, California.

Craig was a four-year letterman for the UCLA Bruins of the University of California, Los Angeles from 1984 to 1987. He caught nine passes for 124 yards and one touchdown as a freshman in 1984 while also returning seven kicks for 105 yards. He recorded six receptions for 74 yards and one touchdown in 1985, 16 receptions for 281 yards and two touchdowns in 1986, and 28 receptions for 507 yards and five touchdowns in 1987.

== Professional career ==
Craig was selected by the Detroit Lions in the 10th round, with the 254th overall pick, of the 1988 NFL draft. He officially signed with the team on July 16. He played in eight games for the Lions during the 1988 season, catching two passes for 29 yards. Craig was released on November 10, 1988.

Craig signed with the Atlanta Falcons on January 20, 1989. He was released on August 29, 1989.

Craig then played in one game for the Toronto Argonauts of the Canadian Football League (CFL) during the 1989 CFL season, recording two receptions for nine yards and one tackle.

Craig was signed by the Los Angeles Rams on March 15, 1990. He was released on September 3, 1990.

Craig played in five games, all starts, for the Sacramento Surge of the World League of American Football in 1991, totaling 12 catches for 205 yards and three kick returns for 61 yards.

== Personal life ==
Craig's nephew Dres Anderson also played football.
