= L. J. Thorpe =

American basketball player (born 1999)

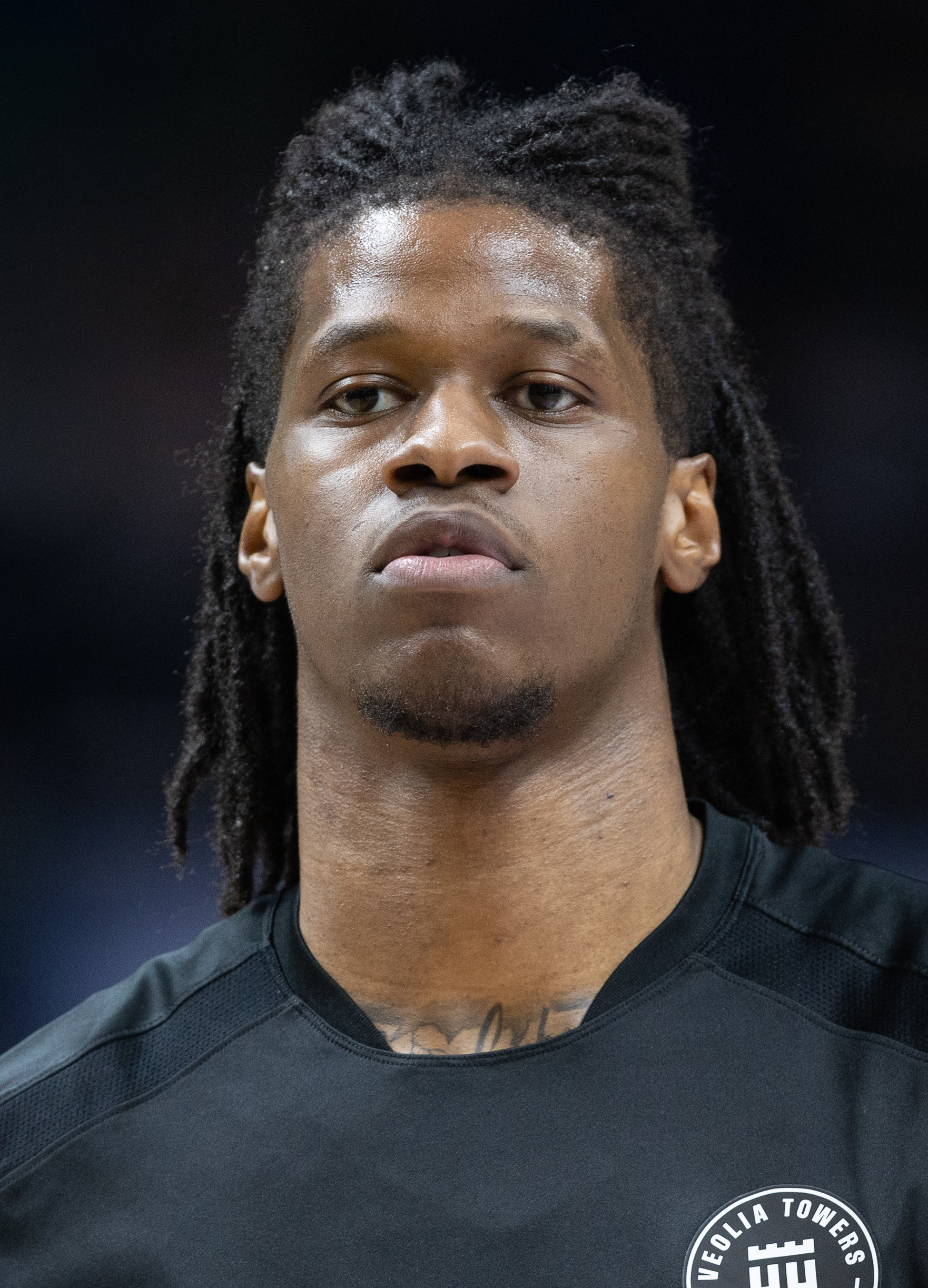
- Thorpe in 2026

No. 77 – BCM Gravelines-Dunkerque
- Position: Point guard
- League: LNB Élite

Personal information
- Born: May 6, 1999 (age 27) Royal Palm Beach, Florida, U.S.
- Listed height: 6 ft 5 in (1.96 m)
- Listed weight: 216 lb (98 kg)

Career information
- High school: Royal Palm Beach (Royal Palm Beach, Florida)
- College: UNC Asheville (2017–2022)
- NBA draft: 2023: undrafted
- Playing career: 2022–present

Career history
- 2022–2023: Tampereen Pyrintö
- 2023–2024: Šiaulių Šiauliai
- 2024: Brampton Honey Badgers
- 2024–2025: Juventus Utena
- 2025–2026: Hamburg Towers
- 2026–present: BCM Gravelines-Dunkerque

Leonard Bernard Thorpe (born May 6, 1999) is an American professional basketball player for BCM Gravelines-Dunkerque of the LNB Élite. He played college basketball for the UNC Asheville Bulldogs.

== High school career ==
Thorpe graduated from Royal Palm Beach High School in Royal Palm Beach, Florida. In his junior year he averaged 13.5 points, 5.6 rebounds and 5.3 assists per game. As a senior he averaged 14.1 points, 7.2 assists and 6.7 rebounds per game. After both his junior and senior years, he was named conference player of the year and first team all-state. Thorpe committed to UNC Asheville after graduating.

== College career ==
Thorpe played only one game before getting injured and redshirted during the 2017–18 season. On 9 February 2019, he scored a then career-high 24 points against the Charleston Southern Buccaneers. On 18 January 2020, Thorpe scored a career-high 31 points against the Hampton Pirates, however Hampton's Ben Stanley outscored Thorpe by putting up 33 points and managed to lead Hampton to an 88–86 victory.

On 10 February 2020, L.J. Thorpe became the second player in program history to record a triple-double (the first one being Kenny George). He led the team with 17 points, recorded a career-high 13 rebounds and career-high 10 assists as the Bulldogs fell 80–70 to the Hampton Pirates.

== Professional career ==
=== Tampereen Pyrintö (2022–2023) ===
On August 8, 2022, he signed with Tampereen Pyrintö of the Korisliiga in Finland. During his stay with the team he averaged 12.7 points and 4.9 assists per game.

=== Šiaulių Šiauliai (2023–2024) ===
On July 18, 2023, he signed with Šiaulių Šiauliai of the Lithuanian Basketball League. On October 26, 2023, Thorpe scored 28 points and hit five three-pointers in a 104–93 win over Pieno žvaigždės Pasvalys.

=== Brampton Honey Badgers (2024) ===
On May 8, 2024, Thorpe signed with the Brampton Honey Badgers of the Canadian Elite Basketball League.

=== Juventus Utena (2024–2025) ===
In July, 2024, Thorpe signed with Juventus Utena of the Lithuanian Basketball League.

=== Hamburg Towers (2025–2026) ===
On June 12, 2025, Thorpe signed with Hamburg Towers of the Basketball Bundesliga.

=== BCM Gravelines-Dunkerque (2026–present) ===
On July 8, 2026, Thorpe signed with BCM Gravelines-Dunkerque of the French LNB Élite.

== Career statistics ==
Legend
GP	Games played	GS	Games started	MPG	Minutes per game
FG%	Field goal percentage	3P%	3-point field goal percentage	FT%	Free throw percentage
RPG	Rebounds per game	APG	Assists per game	SPG	Steals per game
BPG	Blocks per game	PPG	Points per game	**Bold**	Career high

=== College ===
Year	Team	GP	GS	MPG	FG%	3P%	FT%	RPG	APG	SPG	BPG	PPG
2017–18	UNC Asheville	1	0	6.0	**.500**	.000	**.750**	1.0	2.0	**4.0**	0.0	5.0
2018–19	UNC Asheville	16	6	23.9	.385	.268	.679	3.5	2.5	2.5	0.1	8.6
2019–20	UNC Asheville	31	**31**	**28.6**	.486	.404	.686	**6.4**	2.3	1.4	**0.2**	13.9
2020–21	UNC Asheville	20	16	25.1	**.500**	**.405**	.714	4.1	3.0	0.7	**0.2**	11.6
2021–22	UNC Asheville	**32**	27	24.2	.494	.400	.739	3.8	**3.7**	0.9	**0.2**	**14.1**
Career		100	80	25.5	.479	.366	.708	4.6	2.9	1.0	0.2	12.5
