= Arlington High School (California) =

Location
- 2951 Jackson Street; Riverside, California; United States; 33.91395°N 117.428688°W

Information
- Type: Public
- Motto: Remember the name
- Established: 1973
- School district: Riverside Unified School District
- Superintendent: Sonia Llamas
- Principal: Sean Browning
- Teaching staff: 82.61 (FTE)
- Grades: 9–12
- Enrollment: 1,967 (2023-2024)
- Student to teacher ratio: 23.81
- Campus size: 45–47 acres (18–19 ha)
- Color: Maroon Gold
- Athletics conference: CIF Southern Section; River Valley League
- Mascot: Lion
- Nickname: Lions
- Rival: Ramona High School, Poly High School
- Newspaper: The Mane Thing
- Yearbook: Simba Kali
- Feeder schools: Chemawa Middle School
- Website: RUSD Arlington High School

Arlington High School is a public high school in Riverside, California, United States.

== History ==
Founded in 1973, Arlington is one of 5 comprehensive high schools in Riverside Unified School District. The first graduating class at Arlington was the Class of 1975.

Arlington had since used Ramona High School’s football field for their graduations due to the influx of students they received over the years.

The school’s journalism class that produced The Mane Thing since 1984 had ended with its last newspaper issue in early June 2019 following the retirement of the school’s journalist and English teacher. However, the journalism class lasted for another year but officially ended its course in June 2020.

Due to the pandemic, the Class of 2020 graduated through a drive-thru graduation at Arlington.

Plans for the $26.6 million dollar high school’s modernization construction under Measure Project O began in Winter of 2019 but did not start until the Summer of 2020. The construction and updates did not officially start until December 2020.

Removal of 8 handball courts and previous auxiliary gym would be replaced by a 8,755 sf newly updated Auxiliary gymnasium. Along with the removal of 7 portable buildings and a building that housed the old journalism, media, and a classroom building were replaced by the new 10,262 sf Biomedical, Media Arts Academy, and Special education building.

Upgrades were also done to the school’s stadium. A 2,000 sf concession and restroom building, a 1,250 home seat expansion and newly added 1,000 visitors seat expansion of the bleachers at the track and field, and upgrades to the existing stadium field sports lighting. As well as upgrading the Administration Building, Student Service Building, and to the outdoor swimming pool and equipment.

With the school’s construction finishing in early May 2022, the Class of 2022 became the “first” class to graduate at the school's football field in early June 2022.

Arlington hit its 50th year in 2023.

== Sports ==
=== State championships ===
- Baseball – 1999

=== CIF Southern Section champion ===
- Baseball – 1999, 2002, 2004
- Football – 1981,1990, 2021
- Water Polo – 1998
- Girls Water Polo – 2006, 2010
- Girls Tennis – 2008, 2009
- Boys Tennis – 2010, 2011, 2012
- Boys Soccer — 2019

== Activities ==
=== Mock Trial ===
Arlington students won the National High School Mock Trial Championship in 1994.

=== Envirothon champions ===
- Envirothon: 2003, 2004, 2005, 2009, 2010, 2012, 2013

=== Air Force Junior Reserve Officer Training Corps ===
Award-winning corps of cadets learning Integrity, Service, and Excellence from retired Air Force personnel.

=== Choir Program ===
Arlington High School has a renowned choral program and is currently conducted by Tyler Hayes. Previous conductors include Ray Medina, Kelli Dower, and Tim Lutz. The premiere ensemble for Arlington is the Chamber Singers. The Chamber Singers have a rich history and are extremely active within the community, which includes participation in the annual Disneyland Candlelight Procession & Ceremony. In 2014 they were invited to perform at Carnegie Hall in New York and performed there in the summer of 2015.

==== ACDA National Honor Choir Members ====
- Bradford Stephens Tenor II - 2009
- Christian Koshay Tenor I - 2009
- Josue Jurado Bass II - 2009

=== Golden Pride Marching Band and Color Guard ===
The Arlington High School Color Guard made Winter Guard International Class A Finals in 1992. The guard qualified for Open Class Finals in 1994 but got a timing penalty, which moved Clayton Valley High School into Finals.

== Notable alumni ==
- Lucas Duda, former professional baseball player (New York Mets, Atlanta Braves, Kansas City Royals, Tampa Bay Rays)
- Bill Murphy, former professional baseball player (Arizona Diamondbacks, Toronto Blue Jays)
- Nick Neugebauer, former professional baseball player (Milwaukee Brewers)
