= 2022 NBA Summer League =

- League: National Basketball Association
- Sport: Basketball
- Duration: July 7–17
- Teams: California Classic-4; Salt Lake City-4; Las Vegas-30
- TV partner(s): NBA TV & ESPN

California Classic
- Season champions: Sacramento Kings
- Runners-up: Los Angeles Lakers
- Top scorer: Keegan Murray

Salt Lake City Summer League
- Season champions: Oklahoma City Thunder
- Runners-up: Philadelphia 76ers
- Top scorer: Isaiah Joe

Las Vegas NBA Summer League
- Season champions: Portland Trail Blazers
- Runners-up: New York Knicks
- Season MVP: Keegan Murray (league); Trendon Watford (championship game)

NBA Summer League seasons
- ← 2021 2023 →

The 2022 NBA Summer League, also branded as the NBA 2K23 Summer League 2022, was an off-season competition held by the National Basketball Association (NBA) primarily at the Thomas and Mack Center and Cox Pavilion in Las Vegas, Nevada on the campus of University of Nevada, Las Vegas from July 7 to 17, 2022. The summer league consisted of the California Classic, Salt Lake City Summer League, and the Las Vegas NBA Summer League.

== California Classic ==
The Golden State Warriors hosted the fourth annual California Classic at the Chase Center on July 2, 3, and 5.

=== Teams ===
- Golden State Warriors
- Los Angeles Lakers
- Miami Heat
- Sacramento Kings

=== Games ===
==== Day 1 ====
ESPN2

July 2
5:00 pm

Boxscore

Los Angeles Lakers 100, Miami Heat 66
Scoring by quarter: 29–17, 22–10, 19–14, 30–25
Pts: McClung (17); Rebs: Christie (9); Asts: Jones (6)	Pts: Allman Jr. & Smart (13); Rebs: Robinson (9); Asts: Allman Jr. (5)

Chase Center, San Francisco, California
Attendance: 8,806
Referees: Nate Green, Jenna Schroder, Evan Scott

NBA TV

July 2
7:30 pm

Boxscore

Sacramento Kings 86, Golden State Warriors 68
Scoring by quarter: 17–13, 21–19, 29–20, 19–16
Pts: Murray (26); Rebs: Murray (8); Asts: Ferrari (7)	Pts: Santos (23); Rebs: Santos (6); Asts: Willis & Quinones (2)

Chase Center, San Francisco, California
Attendance: 8,913
Referees: Ashley Moyer-Gleich, Brandon Schwab, Mousa Dagher

==== Day 2 ====
NBA TV

July 3
5:00 pm

Boxscore

Miami Heat 64, Sacramento Kings 81
Scoring by quarter: 14–17, 21–16, 21–20, 8–28
Pts: Smart (12); Rebs: Highsmith (9); Asts: Smart (4)	Pts: Ellis (17); Rebs: Murray (9); Asts: Ferrari (6)

Chase Center, San Francisco, California
Attendance: 9,028
Referees: Evan Scott, Ashley Moyer-Gleich, Jenna Schroeder

NBA TV

July 3
7:30 pm

Boxscore

Los Angeles Lakers 100, Golden State Warriors 77
Scoring by quarter: 23–21, 26–16, 23–16, 28–24
Pts: Swider (16); Rebs: White Jr. (8); Asts: Pippen Jr. (8)	Pts: Quinones (19); Rebs: Mawugbe (6); Asts: Moody (3)

Chase Center, San Francisco, California
Attendance: 9,178
Referees: Mousa Dagher, Nate Green, Brandon Schwab

==== Day 3 ====
NBA TV

July 5
3:00 pm

Boxscore

Golden State Warriors 70, Miami Heat 94
Scoring by quarter: 22–27, 16–24, 21–17, 11–26
Pts: Weatherspoon (14); Rebs: Three players tied (4); Asts: Santos & Sleva (5)	Pts: Jović (25); Rebs: Jović & Highsmith (9); Asts: Allman Jr. (10)

Chase Center, San Francisco, California
Attendance: 0
Referees: Brandon Schwab, Evan Scott, Nate Green

NBA TV

July 5
5:30 pm

Boxscore

Sacramento Kings 87, Los Angeles Lakers 75
Scoring by quarter: 24–22, 19–21, 22–11, 22–21
Pts: Murray (24); Rebs: Queta (10); Asts: Ferrari (6)	Pts: McCoy (15); Rebs: Christie (8); Asts: Pippen Jr. (3)

Chase Center, San Francisco, California
Attendance: 0
Referees: Jenna Schroeder, Ashley Moyer-Gleich, Mousa Dagher

== Salt Lake City Summer League ==
The Utah Jazz hosted a round-robin tournament in the Vivint Arena on July 5–7, the seventh year it has held its summer league.

=== Teams ===
- Utah Jazz
- Oklahoma City Thunder
- Memphis Grizzlies
- Philadelphia 76ers

=== Games ===
==== Day 1 ====
ESPN

July 5
7:00 pm

Boxscore

Memphis Grizzlies 103, Philadelphia 76ers 99
Scoring by quarter: 34–28, 28–26, 29–26, 15–16
Pts: Tillman (16); Rebs: 4 players tied (4); Asts: Williams (8)	Pts: Reed (20); Rebs: Reed (15); Asts: Winston (8)

Vivint Arena, Salt Lake City, Utah
Attendance: 5,377
Referees: JP Primm, Matt Myers, Andy Nagy

ESPN

July 5
9:00 pm

Boxscore

Oklahoma City Thunder 98, Utah Jazz 77
Scoring by quarter: 29–9, 18–23, 29–18, 22–27
Pts: Holmgren (23); Rebs: Robinson-Earl (10); Asts: Giddey (11)	Pts: Sneed (15); Rebs: Cockburn (7); Asts: Butler (4)

Vivint Arena, Salt Lake City, Utah
Attendance: 6,641
Referees: Suyash Mehta, Danielle Scott, John Conley

==== Day 2 ====
ESPN2

July 6
7:00 pm

Boxscore

Memphis Grizzlies 71, Oklahoma City Thunder 87
Scoring by quarter: 20–20, 23–28, 14–24, 14–15
Pts: Lofton Jr. (19); Rebs: Mathias (8); Asts: Waters (5)	Pts: Williams (16); Rebs: Holmgren (12); Asts: Giddey (10)

Vivint Arena, Salt Lake City, Utah
Attendance: 0
Referees: Danielle Scott, Matt Myers, Andy Nagy

ESPN2

July 6
9:00 pm

Boxscore

Philadelphia 76ers 86, Utah Jazz 82
Scoring by quarter: 22–21, 17–22, 27–18, 20–21
Pts: Bassey (17); Rebs: Champagnie (10); Asts: Winston (6)	Pts: Robinson (17); Rebs: Palmer Jr. (8); Asts: Palmer Jr. (4)

Vivint Arena, Salt Lake City, Utah
Attendance: 7,153
Referees: Coach Erman, Suyash Mehta, John Conley

==== Day 3 ====
NBA TV

July 7
6:00 pm

Boxscore

Oklahoma City Thunder 79, Philadelphia 76ers 80
Scoring by quarter: 15–19, 24–20, 23–20, 17–21
Pts: Pokuševski (14); Rebs: Robinson-Earl (7); Asts: Giddey (7)	Pts: Joe (19); Rebs: Queen (8); Asts: Springer (3)

Vivint Arena, Salt Lake City, Utah
Attendance: 0
Referees: Coach Erman, Suyash Mehta, Matt Myers

NBA TV

July 7
8:00 pm

Boxscore

Memphis Grizzlies 95, Utah Jazz 84
Scoring by quarter: 17–29, 21–21, 30–18, 27–16
Pts: Williams (19); Rebs: Tillman (14); Asts: Waters (5)	Pts: Butler (22); Rebs: Cockburn (9); Asts: Butler (7)

Vivint Arena, Salt Lake City, Utah
Attendance: 0
Referees: Andy Nagy, John Conley, Danielle Scott

== Las Vegas Summer League ==
The Las Vegas NBA Summer League is an official summer league of the NBA—the sixteenth year it has been held. The league played games across two venues: the Thomas and Mack Center and Cox Pavilion, both located in Paradise, Nevada, which is near Las Vegas.

=== Format ===
Five games were played between all 30 NBA teams from July 7 to 17. Each team played a total of five games. The top two teams from their first four games played in the Championship Game on July 17. Seeding for the Championship Game was determined by winning percentage considering tiebreakers.

The 28 teams not playing in the Championship Game played a fifth game on either July 16 or 17. Consolation games were determined by various factors, including team rivalries, broadcast interest, and other scheduling considerations (e.g., timing of back-to-backs).

==== Tiebreak criteria ====
1. Two Teams Tied - In the case of a tie in preliminary round records involving only two teams, the following criteria, in order, were utilized:

• Head-to-head matchup: The team that won the game between the two teams in the preliminary round, if applicable, receives the higher seed.

• Point differential: The team with the greater point differential receives the higher seed.

• Random drawing: The higher seed shall be determined by a “coin flip.”

2. More Than Two Teams Tied - In the case of a tie in preliminary round records involving more than two teams, the following criteria, in order, were utilized:

• Point differential: The team with the greater point differential receives the higher seed.

• Random drawing: The higher seed shall be determined by a “coin flip.”

=== Teams ===
- Atlanta Hawks
- Boston Celtics
- Brooklyn Nets
- Charlotte Hornets
- Chicago Bulls
- Cleveland Cavaliers
- Dallas Mavericks
- Detroit Pistons
- Denver Nuggets
- Golden State Warriors
- Houston Rockets
- Indiana Pacers
- Los Angeles Clippers
- Los Angeles Lakers
- Memphis Grizzlies
- Miami Heat
- Milwaukee Bucks
- Minnesota Timberwolves
- New Orleans Pelicans
- New York Knicks
- Oklahoma City Thunder
- Orlando Magic
- Philadelphia 76ers
- Phoenix Suns
- Portland Trail Blazers
- Sacramento Kings
- San Antonio Spurs
- Toronto Raptors
- Utah Jazz
- Washington Wizards

=== Games ===
==== Day 1 ====
ESPN

July 7
10:00 pm

Boxscore

Houston Rockets 77, Orlando Magic 91
Scoring by quarter: 22–23, 20–30, 23–18, 12–20
Pts: Christopher (22); Rebs: Eason (13); Asts: Nix (4)	Pts: Houstan (20); Rebs: Hampton (11); Asts: Banchero (6)

Thomas & Mack Center, Paradise, Nevada
Referees: Isaac Barnett, Nate Anderson, Kelly Broomfield

ESPN

July 7
12:00 am

Boxscore

Portland Trail Blazers 78, Detroit Pistons 81
Scoring by quarter: 19–29, 15–12, 23–20, 21–20
Pts: Johnson 21; Rebs: Walker 7 Asts: Ross & Williams (4)	Pts: Ivey (20); Rebs: Stewart (9); Asts: Ivey (6)

Thomas & Mack Center, Paradise, Nevada
Referees: Dannica Mosher, Matt Rafferty, Nate Cearley

===== Influencer Tournament =====
The NBA 2K23 Summer League Influencer Tournament was held on July 7 at the Cox Pavilion before the first slate of games.

It featured the following influencers: Adrianna Brown, Austin J. Mills, Bionic Brooks, Bone Collector, Bree Green, Caleb Nash Feemster, Cam Wilder, Christopher CRSWHT Egan, Chris Staples, DC Heat, DJ Clue, Grace Hunter, Jake Randall, Jenna Bandy, Jeremy Jones, Jordan Southerland, Kris London, Marcelas Howard, Maxwell Pearce, Pete Randall, Sniper Jones, Trey Uno Armstrong, and Whit3 Iverson.

==== Day 2 ====
ESPN U

July 8
4:00 pm

Boxscore

Dallas Mavericks 99, Chicago Bulls 100 (OT)
Scoring by quarter: 17–21, 30–12, 17–25, 26–32, Overtime: 9–10
Pts: Lawson & Hardy (28); Rebs: Three players tied (5); Asts: Pajola (8)	Pts: Simonovic (27); Rebs: Simonovic (13); Asts: Jones (9)

Thomas & Mack Center, Paradise, Nevada
Referees: Ryan Sassano, Hortencia Sanchez-Carrizales, Manuel Mazzoni

NBA TV

July 8
5:00 pm

Boxscore

San Antonio Spurs 90, Cleveland Cavaliers 99
Scoring by quarter: 22–27, 23–21, 17–30, 28–21
Pts: Primo & Wesley (20 each); Rebs: Barlow & Days (7 each); Asts: Stewart (6)	Pts: Nembhard Jr. (20); Rebs: Sylla & Mobley (8 each); Asts: Nembhard Jr. (5)

Cox Pavilion, Paradise, Nevada
Referees: Isaac Barnett, Intae Hwang, Gytis Vilius

ESPN2

July 8
6:00 pm

Boxscore

Charlotte Hornets 84, Indiana Pacers 96
Scoring by quarter: 19–28, 18–14, 13–32, 34–22
Pts: McGowens (17); Rebs: Richards (11); Asts: Crutcher (7)	Pts: Mathurin (23); Rebs: Jackson (12); Asts: Washington Jr. (6)

Thomas & Mack Center, Paradise, Nevada
Referees: Clare Aubry, Omar Bermudez, Boris Krejic

NBA TV

July 8
7:00 pm

Boxscore

Brooklyn Nets 90, Milwaukee Bucks 94
Scoring by quarter: 20–21, 20–23, 15–28, 35–22
Pts: Thomas (31); Rebs: Sharpe (10); Asts: Gray (4)	Pts: Mamukelashvili & Wigginton (17 each); Rebs: Zylan Cheatham (8); Asts: Wigginton (8)

Cox Pavilion, Paradise, Nevada
Referees: ShaRae Mitchell, Cameron Gelinas, Grant Todey

ESPN2

July 8
8:00 pm

Boxscore

Golden State Warriors 88, New York Knicks 101
Scoring by quarter: 20–26, 25–16, 22–35, 21–24
Pts: Moody (34); Rebs: Uthoff (10); Asts: Kuminga, McClung, & Weatherspoon (3 each)	Pts: Grimes (24); Rebs: Sims (10); Asts: Grimes (8)

Thomas & Mack Center, Paradise, Nevada
Referees: Cheryl Flores, Randy Richardson, Yohan Rosso

NBA TV

July 8
9:00 pm

Boxscore

Denver Nuggets 78, Minnesota Timberwolves 85
Scoring by quarter: 14–15, 25–30, 17–20, 22–20
Pts: Braun (18); Rebs: Watson and Kamagate (7 each); Asts: Gillespie (4)	Pts: Minott (22); Rebs: Minott (10); Asts: Minott & Shayok (3 each)

Cox Pavilion, Paradise, Nevada
Referees: Pat OConnell, Kristyne Esparza, Roberto Vazquez

ESPN2

July 8
10:00 pm

Boxscore

Phoenix Suns 104, Los Angeles Lakers 84
Scoring by quarter: 24–17, 24–25, 33–21, 23–21
Pts: King (20); Rebs: Sarr (10); Asts: Wright IV (7)	Pts: Pippen Jr. (19); Rebs: Christie (8); Asts: Pippen Jr. (3)

Thomas & Mack Center, Paradise, Nevada
Referees: Robert Hussey, Ken Jones, Martins Kozlovkis

==== Day 3 ====
NBA TV

July 9
3:30 pm

Report

Toronto Raptors 97, Philadelphia 76ers 77
Scoring by quarter: 24–13, 17–31, 30–26, 26–7
Pts: Brooks (25); Rebs: Banton, Brooks, Koloko (7 each); Asts: Dowtin (9)	Pts: Joe (24); Rebs: Bassey (6); Asts: Winston (7)

Cox Pavilion, Paradise, Nevada
Referees: Charles Watson, Agon Abazi, Sarah Williams, Gina Cross

ESPN

July 9
4:00 pm

Boxscore

Orlando Magic 94, Sacramento Kings 92 (2OT)
Scoring by quarter: 18–24, 26–18, 26–17, 17–28, Overtime: 5–5, 2–0
Pts: Banchero (23); Rebs: Terry (9); Asts: Banchero (6)	Pts: Queta (23); Rebs: Queta (8); Asts: Ellis & Ferrari (4)

Thomas & Mack Center, Paradise, Nevada
Referees: Brent Haskill, Kaitlyn Bunger, Kaz Beverly

NBA TV

July 9
5:30 pm

Boxscore

Boston Celtics 78, Miami Heat 88
Scoring by quarter: 25–24, 22–33, 14–14, 17–17
Pts: Ryan (15); Rebs: 4 players tied (6); Asts: Davison (6)	Pts: Mulder (23); Rebs: Robinson (8); Asts: Bouyea (5)

Cox Pavilion, Paradise, Nevada
Referees: Matt Kallio, Jeff Wooten, Gerda Gatling, Leah Lanie

ESPN2

July 9
6:00 pm

Boxscore

Detroit Pistons 105, Washington Wizards 99
Scoring by quarter: 39–23, 20–14, 20–30, 26–32
Pts: Livers (20); Rebs: Stewart (9); Asts: Moore (7)	Pts: Schakel (24); Rebs: Davis & Goodwin (5); Asts: Dotson (3)

Thomas & Mack Center, Paradise, Nevada
Referees: Biniam Maru, Catherine Chang, Jean Ruhamiriza

NBA TV

July 9
7:30 pm

Boxscore

Atlanta Hawks 66, Utah Jazz 72
Scoring by quarter: 13–21, 13–18, 18–22, 22–11
Pts: Brown Jr. (15); Rebs: Akinjo (8); Asts: Akinjo (6)	Pts: Butler (15); Rebs: Cockburn (13); Asts: Butler (7)

Cox Pavilion, Paradise, Nevada
Referees: J.D. Ralls, Italo Araujo, Erik Aellig

ESPN2

July 9
8:00 pm

Boxscore

Oklahoma City Thunder 88, Houston Rockets 90
Scoring by quarter: 25–21, 15–24, 25–19, 23–26
Pts: Williams (15); Rebs: Holmgren (8); Asts: Giddey (8)	Pts: Christopher (19); Rebs: Eason (11); Asts: Nix (6)

Thomas & Mack Center, Paradise, Nevada
Referees: Dannica Mosher, Julian McFadden, Gina Catanzariti, Rachael Rayford

NBA TV

July 9
9:30 pm

Boxscore

Los Angeles Clippers 94, Memphis Grizzlies 76
Scoring by quarter: 28–15, 24–17, 25–23, 17–21
Pts: Perry (17); Rebs: Moon & Diabate (7); Asts: Preston (6)	Pts: Lofton Jr. (18); Rebs: Aldama (8); Asts: Chandler (3)

Cox Pavilion, Paradise, Nevada
Referees: Tyler Mirkovich, Angelica Suffren, Martins Kozlovkis

ESPN2

July 9
10:00 pm

New Orleans Pelicans 68, Portland Trail Blazers 85
Scoring by quarter: 19–14, 17–31, 9–23, 23–17
Pts: Murphy III (23); Rebs: Murphy III (8); Asts: Marshall (6)	Pts: Watford (17); Rebs: Watford (11); Asts: Watford (5)

Thomas & Mack Center, Paradise, Nevada
Referees: Angel Kent, Paul Tuomey, Cameron Garber, Ryan Johnson

==== Day 4 ====
ESPN

July 10
3:00 pm

Boxscore

Indiana Pacers 96, Sacramento Kings 103
Scoring by quarter: 25–33, 24–24, 26–17, 21–29
Pts: Taylor (16); Rebs: Jackson (8); Asts: Nembhard (3)	Pts: Murray (23); Rebs: Queta (7); Asts: Ellis (6)

Cox Pavilion, Paradise, Nevada
Referees: Dannica Mosher, Kaitlyn Bunger, Kenny Gardner, Bobby Bissant

NBA TV

July 10
3:30 pm

Boxscore

Philadelphia 76ers 84, Brooklyn Nets 91
Scoring by quarter: 21–22, 21–22, 24–23, 18–24
Pts: Winston (16); Rebs: Bassey (9); Asts: Winston (7)	Pts: Thomas (26); Rebs: Sharpe (11); Asts: Thomas (7)

Thomas & Mack Center, Paradise, Nevada
Referees: Julian Scott, Kelly Broomfield, Roberto Vazquez

ESPN2

July 10
5:00 pm

Boxscore

Chicago Bulls 69, New York Knicks 101
Scoring by quarter: 11–27, 13–30, 26–20, 19–22
Pts: Terry & Jones (13 each); Rebs: Simonović (7); Asts: Terry (3)	Pts: Grimes (24); Rebs: Sims (10); Asts: McBride (6)

Cox Pavilion, Paradise, Nevada
Referees: Randy Richardson, Jeff Wooten, Yohan Rosso

NBATV

July 10
5:30 pm

Boxscore

Washington Wizards 97, Phoenix Suns 72
Scoring by quarter: 20–13, 31–19, 21–20, 25–20
Pts: Carey Jr. (15); Rebs: Carey Jr. (11); Asts: Dotson (6)	Pts: Carter (12); Rebs: Wainright (5); Asts: Wright IV (3)

Thomas & Mack Center, Paradise, Nevada
Referees: Tyler Ricks, Marcy Williams, Gytis Vilius

ESPNU

July 10
7:00 pm

Boxscore

Denver Nuggets 87, Cleveland Cavaliers 76
Scoring by quarter: 21–26, 29–20, 15–14, 19–16
Pts: Watson (19); Rebs: White (15); Asts: Gillespie (6)	Pts: Nembhard Jr. (19); Rebs: Agbaji (6); Asts: Mobley & Agbaji (3 each)

Cox Pavilion, Paradise, Nevada
Referees: Angelica Suffren, Ben Stirt, Manuel Mazzoni

NBA TV

July 10
7:30 pm

Boxscore

Golden State Warriors 86, San Antonio Spurs 85
Scoring by quarter: 24–23, 10–25, 27–20, 25–17
Pts: Kuminga (28); Rebs: Kuminga (7); Asts: McClung (6)	Pts: Wesley (22); Rebs: Days (12); Asts: Primo (4)

Thomas & Mack Center, Paradise, Nevada
Referees: ShaRae Mitchell, Klajdi Mulla, Grant Todey

ESPNU

July 10
9:00 pm

Boxscore

Minnesota Timberwolves 63, Memphis Grizzlies 71
Scoring by quarter: 17–21, 14–10, 15–16, 17–24
Pts: Harris (17); Rebs: McCormack (9); Asts: Moore Jr. & Spagnolo (2 each)	Pts: Aldama (22); Rebs: Lofton Jr. (10); Asts: Chandler (4)

Cox Pavilion, Paradise, Nevada
Referees: Ryan Sassano, Kelsey Reynolds, Yohan Rosso

NBA TV

July 10
9:30 pm

Boxscore

Charlotte Hornets 89, Los Angeles Lakers 86 (2OT)
Scoring by quarter: 18–31, 25–17, 17–15, 21–18, Overtime: 5–5, 3–0
Pts: Alexander (22); Rebs: Richards & Figueroa (9 each); Asts: Alexander (6)	Pts: Swider (21); Rebs: Pierre-Louis, Killeya-Jones, & O'Neal (7 each); Asts: Pippen Jr. (7)

Thomas & Mack Center, Paradise, Nevada
Referees: Angel Kent, Josh Wilson, Martins Kozlovkis

==== Day 5 ====
NBA TV

July 11
6:00 pm

Boxscore

New Orleans Pelicans 101, Atlanta Hawks 73
Scoring by quarter: 27–20, 26–17, 14–20, 34–16
Pts: Murphy III (30); Rebs: Jones (9); Asts: Harper (7)	Pts: Brown Jr. & Tillman (14); Rebs: Tillman (6); Asts: Akinjo (5)

Cox Pavilion, Paradise, Nevada
Referees: Tyler Mirkovich, Ian McClenny, Grant Todey

ESPN

July 11
7:00 pm

Boxscore

Houston Rockets 97, San Antonio Spurs 84
Scoring by quarter: 19–20, 27–34, 21–11, 30–19
Pts: Eason (22); Rebs: Eason (10); Asts: Nix (6)	Pts: Branham (20); Rebs: Days (11); Asts: Wesley (4)

Thomas & Mack Center, Paradise, Nevada
Referees: Brent Haskill, Cameron Gelinas, Boris Krejic

NBA TV

July 11
8:00 pm

Boxscore

Milwaukee Bucks 109, Boston Celtics 111
Scoring by quarter: 24–22, 20–30, 39–28, 26–31
Pts: Mamukelashvili (28); Rebs: Mamukelashvili (9); Asts: Wigginton (5)	Pts: Ryan (23); Rebs: Kabengele (11); Asts: Davison (6)

Cox Pavilion, Paradise, Nevada
Referees: J.D. Ralls, Omar Bermudez, Roberto Vazquez

ESPN

July 11
9:00 pm

Boxscore

Orlando Magic 81, Oklahoma City Thunder 84
Scoring by quarter: 31–14, 24–16, 22–21, 21–16
Pts: James (16); Rebs: Terry (14); Asts: Simpson (7)	Pts: Holmgren (16); Rebs: Holmgren (10); Asts: Giddey (8)

Thomas & Mack Center, Paradise, Nevada
Referees: Grant Detrick, Julian McFadden, Yohan Rosso

NBA TV

July 11
10:00 pm

Boxscore

Dallas Mavericks 82, Utah Jazz 83
Scoring by quarter: 17–12, 23–30, 18–24, 24–17
Pts: Harding (18); Rebs: Lawson (12); Asts: Hardy (5)	Pts: Fall (12); Rebs: Fall (15); Asts: Butler (10)

Cox Pavilion, Paradise, Nevada
Referees: Pat OConnell, Jason Alabanza, Gytis Vilius

ESPN2

July 11
11:00 pm

Boxscore

New York Knicks 77, Portland Trail Blazers 88
Scoring by quarter: 24–9, 12–28, 21–22, 20–29
Pts: Grimes (24); Rebs: Sims (11); Asts: Hunt, Sims & McBride (4)	Pts: Watford (18); Rebs: Walker (13); Asts: Johnson & Williams (4)

Thomas & Mack Center, Paradise, Nevada
Referees: Robert Hussey, Italo Araujo, Cheryl Flores, Richard Jefferson

==== Day 6 ====
NBA TV

July 12
5:00 pm

Boxscore

Chicago Bulls 93, Toronto Raptors 83
Scoring by quarter: 24–19, 28–18, 29–18, 13–28
Pts: Jones (17); Rebs: Maker (6); Asts: Jones (5)	Pts: Banton (18); Rebs: Wilson (5); Asts: Banton (5)

Thomas & Mack Center, Paradise, Nevada
Referees: Clare Aubry, Kevin Fahy, Manuel Mazzoni

ESPN2

July 12
6:00 pm

Boxscore

Memphis Grizzlies 120, Brooklyn Nets 84
Scoring by quarter: 34–22, 31–19, 23–26, 32–17
Pts: Aldama (31); Rebs: Lofton Jr. (8); Asts: Williams (8)	Pts: Thomas (29); Rebs: Sharpe (9); Asts: Duke Jr. (4)

Cox Pavilion, Paradise, Nevada
Referees: Dannica Mosher, Chelisa Painter, Jean Ruhamiriza

NBA TV

July 12
7:00 pm

Boxscore

Atlanta Hawks 95, Miami Heat 88
Scoring by quarter: 23–17, 26–27, 28–21, 18–23
Pts: Martin (21); Rebs: Ayayi (8); Asts: Cooper (9)	Pts: Smart (19); Rebs: Robinson (6); Asts: Smart (3)

Thomas & Mack Center, Paradise, Nevada
Referees: Cheryl Flores, Hortencia Sanchez-Carrizales, Kaz Beverly, Erik Aellig

ESPN

July 12
9:00 pm

Boxscore

Boston Celtics 103, Golden State Warriors 92
Scoring by quarter: 38–18, 26–26, 21–25, 18–23
Pts: Jackson (24); Rebs: Kabengele (13); Asts: Davison (9)	Pts: Kuminga (29); Rebs: Santos (8); Asts: McClung (5)

Thomas & Mack Center, Paradise, Nevada
Referees: Angel Kent, Cameron Garber, Ryan Johnson

NBA TV

July 12
9:00 pm

Boxscore

Detroit Pistons 87, Indiana Pacers 101
Scoring by quarter: 11–25, 19–27, 24–26, 33–23
Pts: Boeheim (18); Rebs: Key (5); Asts: Moore (5)	Pts: Mathurin (20); Rebs: Taylor (9); Asts: Brown (4)

Cox Pavilion, Paradise, Nevada
Referees: Tyler Ricks, Intae Hwang, Catherine Chang

NBA TV

July 12
11:00 pm

Boxscore

Phoenix Suns 105, Dallas Mavericks 78
Scoring by quarter: 26–13, 21–12, 29–22, 29–31
Pts: King (14); Rebs: King, Sarr (10); Asts: Wright IV (5)	Pts: Harding (20); Rebs: Kuath (7); Asts: Harding, Pajola (5)

Cox Pavilion, Paradise, Nevada
Referees: Ryan Sassano, Teresa Stuck, Lauren Niemiera

ESPN

July 12
11:00 pm

Boxscore

Los Angeles Lakers 83, Los Angeles Clippers 72
Scoring by quarter: 19–27, 24–19, 19–16, 21–10
Pts: Jones (15); Rebs: Jones (10); Asts: Jones, Pippen Jr. (4)	Pts: Boston, Scrubb (15); Rebs: Boston (9); Asts: Moon (5)

Thomas & Mack Center, Paradise, Nevada
Referees: Kristyne Esparza, Julian Scott, Nate Cearley

==== Day 7 ====
NBA TV

July 13
4:00 pm

Boxscore

Minnesota Timberwolves 75, Milwaukee Bucks 87
Scoring by quarter: 18–21, 21–20, 24–24, 12–22
Pts: Harris (16); Rebs: Harris (5); Asts: Shayok & Harris (4)	Pts: Mamukelashvili (18); Rebs: Mamukelashvili (15); Asts: Tucker (5)

Thomas & Mack Center, Paradise, Nevada
Referees: Pat OConnell, Kevin Fahy, Sarah Williams, Gina Cross

ESPNU

July 13
5:00 pm

Boxscore

Cleveland Cavaliers 80, Charlotte Hornets 91
Scoring by quarter: 18–19, 26–27, 19–29, 17–16
Pts: Agbaji (24); Rebs: Mobley (11); Asts: Nembhard Jr.	Pts: McGowens (24); Rebs: Williams (8); Asts: Crutcher (7)

Cox Pavilion, Paradise, Nevada
Referees: Ashley Gloss, Nate Anderson, Bobby Bissant

NBA TV

July 13
6:00 pm

Boxscore

Washington Wizards 88, New Orleans Pelicans 106
Scoring by quarter: 29–22, 20–24, 15–28, 24–32
Pts: Carey Jr. & Hall (11); Rebs: Carey Jr., Davis & Dotson (4); Asts: Henry (7)	Pts: Sirvydis (25); Rebs: Jones (15); Asts: Harper (6)

Thomas & Mack Center, Paradise, Nevada
Referees: Paul Tuomey, Jacob Barnett, Gerda Gatling, Leah Lanie

ESPNU

July 13
7:00 pm

Boxscore

Toronto Raptors 80, Utah Jazz 74
Scoring by quarter: 24–12, 22–18, 15–15, 19–29
Pts: Wilson (22); Rebs: Wilson (9); Asts: Banton (4)	Pts: Butler (12); Rebs: Caboclo (9); Asts: Butler (6)

Cox Pavilion, Paradise, Nevada
Referees: Brent Haskill, Intae Hwang, Italo Araujo

NBA TV

July 13
8:00 pm

Boxscore

Sacramento Kings 80, Oklahoma City Thunder 86
Scoring by quarter: 19–15, 13–29, 21–24, 27–18
Pts: Murray (29); Rebs: Murray (7); Asts: Ferrari (7)	Pts: Mann (15); Rebs: Dieng & Williams (7); Asts: Mann (7)

Thomas & Mack Center, Paradise, Nevada
Referees: Robert Hussey, Blanca Burns, Rachael Rayford, Gina Catanzariti

ESPNU

July 13
9:00 pm

Boxscore

Miami Heat 71, Philadelphia 76ers 75
Scoring by quarter: 18–17, 16–15, 20–24, 17–19
Pts: Smart (20); Rebs: Robinson (10); Asts: Smart (4)	Pts: Queen (16); Rebs: Ellison (10); Asts: Winston (7)

Cox Pavilion, Paradise, Nevada
Referees: Jenna Reneau, Matt Rafferty, Erik Aellig

NBA TV

July 13
10:00 pm

Boxscore

Denver Nuggets 80, Los Angeles Clippers 75
Scoring by quarter: 21–14, 22–17, 19–22, 18–22
Pts: Mitchell (17); Rebs: Braun (12); Asts: Braun (5)	Pts: Scrubb (18); Rebs: Brantley (8); Asts: Preston (6)

Thomas & Mack Center, Paradise, Nevada
Referees: Biniam Maru, Kelsey Reynolds, Kenny Gardner

==== Day 8 ====
ESPN2

July 14
3:00 pm

Boxscore

Atlanta Hawks 87, San Antonio Spurs 86
Scoring by quarter: 20–21, 16–28, 25–21, 26–16
Pts: Cooper (15); Rebs: Ayayi (11); Asts: Ayayi (5)	Pts: Wesley (20); Rebs: Woodard (8); Asts: Wesley (6)

Cox Pavilion, Paradise, Nevada
Referees: Angel Kent, Teresa Stuck, Ryan Johnson

NBA TV

July 14
3:30 pm

Boxscore

Memphis Grizzlies 91, Boston Celtics 108
Scoring by quarter: 16–24, 23–27, 24–28, 28–29
Pts: Williams (21); Rebs: Williams (7); Asts: Chandler (10)	Pts: Davison (28); Rebs: Williams (11); Asts: Davison (10)

Thomas & Mack Center, Paradise, Nevada
Referees: Tyler Ricks, Marcy Williams, Kaz Beverly

ESPN2

July 14
5:00 pm

Boxscore

Chicago Bulls 89, Charlotte Hornets 73
Scoring by quarter: 20–14, 22–10, 25–23, 22–26
Pts: Terry (20); Rebs: Simonovic (13); Asts: Jones (6)	Pts: McGowens (15); Rebs: Thor (9); Asts: Williams (4)

Cox Pavilion, Paradise, Nevada
Referees: Matt Kallio, Lauren Niemiera, Sarah Williams

NBA TV

July 14
5:30 pm

Boxscore

Cleveland Cavaliers 82, Detroit Pistons 79
Scoring by quarter: 28–13, 17–13, 15–23, 22–30
Pts: Young (15); Rebs: Agbaji (7); Asts: Nembhard Jr. (4)	Pts: Bernard (14); Rebs: Koprivica (10); Asts: Moore (7)

Thomas & Mack Center, Paradise, Nevada
Referees: Isaac Barnett, Julian Scott, Stephanie Barksdale

ESPNU

July 14
7:00 pm

Boxscore

Dallas Mavericks 89, Milwaukee Bucks 100
Scoring by quarter: 28–17, 14–25, 18–31, 29–27
Pts: Wright (26); Rebs: Wright (11); Asts: Harding (5)	Pts: Wiggington (25); Rebs: Tucker (8); Asts: Beauchamp, Tucker & Wigginton (4)

Cox Pavilion, Paradise, Nevada
Referees: Charles Watson, Shante Anderson, Gina Cross

NBA TV

July 14
7:30 pm

Boxscore

New York Knicks 102, Orlando Magic 89
Scoring by quarter: 27–17, 18–21, 29–29, 28–22
Pts: McBride (23); Rebs: Sims (10); Asts: McBride (5)	Pts: Kuhse (25); Rebs: Terry & Simpson (6); Asts: Simpson (9)

Thomas & Mack Center, Paradise, Nevada
Referees: ShaRae Mitchell, Ian McClenny, Jason Alabanza

ESPNU

July 14
9:00 pm

Boxscore

Brooklyn Nets 102, Minnesota Timberwolves 83
Scoring by quarter: 25–20, 30–22, 24–25, 23–16
Pts: Thomas (26); Rebs: Sharpe (10); Asts: Duke Jr. (6)	Pts: Moore Jr. (16); Rebs: Minott (12); Asts: Moore Jr. (7)

Cox Pavilion, Paradise, Nevada
Referees: Jenna Reneau, Ben Stirt, Kristyne Esparza

NBA TV

July 14
9:30 pm

Boxscore

Portland Trail Blazers 85, Houston Rockets 77
Scoring by quarter: 14–28, 22–13, 27–13, 22–23
Pts: Johnson (25); Rebs: Walker (9); Asts: Williams (6)	Pts: Smith Jr. (19); Rebs: Smith Jr. (10); Asts: Washington (6)

Thomas & Mack Center, Paradise, Nevada
Referees: Blanca Burns, Maripier Malo, Cameron Garber

==== Day 9 ====
ESPN2

July 15
5:00 pm

Boxscore

Los Angeles Clippers 82, Utah Jazz 65
Scoring by quarter: 23–16, 16–21, 11–19, 32–9
Pts: Boston Jr. (22); Rebs: Boston Jr. (8); Asts: Moon (6)	Pts: Bolmaro (19); Rebs: Fall (9); Asts: Robinson (7)

Thomas & Mack Center, Paradise, Nevada
Referees: Ashley Gloss, Josh Wilson, Jacob Barnett

NBA TV

July 15
6:00 pm

Boxscore

Philadelphia 76ers 97, Denver Nuggets 71
Scoring by quarter: 22–9, 26–18, 25–16, 24–28
Pts: Riller (18); Rebs: Foster Jr. & Smith (8); Asts: Queen (5)	Pts: Braun (11); Rebs: Braun (6); Asts: Braun & Wills (6)

Cox Pavilion, Paradise, Nevada
Referees: Agon Abazi, Klajdi Mulla, Rachael Rayford

ESPN

July 15
7:00 pm

Boxscore

Oklahoma City Thunder 90, Golden State Warriors 82
Scoring by quarter: 19–18, 24–19, 20–21, 27–24
Pts: Robinson-Earl (15); Rebs: Robinson-Earl (14); Asts: Williams (6)	Pts: Kuminga (16); Rebs: Quinones & Wiseman (7); Asts: McClung (4)

Thomas & Mack Center, Paradise, Nevada
Referees: Paul Tuomey, Catherine Chang, Gerda Gatling

NBA TV

July 15
8:00 pm

Boxscore

Sacramento Kings 82, Phoenix Suns 69
Scoring by quarter: 22–12, 30–24, 20–15, 10–18
Pts: Murray (21); Rebs: Murray & Queta (10); Asts: Ellis (4)	Pts: Wainright (13); Rebs: Lual-Acuil Jr. (6); Asts: Wright IV (8)

Cox Pavilion, Paradise, Nevada
Referees: Robert Hussey, Ken Jones, Kenny Gardner

ESPN2

July 15
9:00 pm

Boxscore

Indiana Pacers 79, Washington Wizards 97
Scoring by quarter: 17–16, 23–29, 22–35, 17–17
Pts: Brown (14); Rebs: Shittu (8); Asts: Nembhard (9)	Pts: Schakel (21); Rebs: Todd & Echenique (8); Asts: Spencer (7)

Thomas & Mack Center, Paradise, Nevada
Referees: Clare Aubry, Grant Detrick, Leah Lanie

NBA TV

July 15
10:00 pm

Boxscore

Miami Heat 78, Toronto Raptors 88
Scoring by quarter: 18–20, 17–28, 14–22, 29–18
Pts: Allman Jr. (17); Rebs: Robinson (11); Asts: Allman Jr. (4)	Pts: Banton (18); Rebs: Dowtin (8); Asts: Dowtin (5)

Cox Pavilion, Paradise, Nevada
Referees: J.D. Ralls, Chelisa Painter, Bobby Bissant

ESPN2

July 15
11:00 pm

Boxscore

Los Angeles Lakers 102, New Orleans Pelicans 99
Scoring by quarter: 19–27, 33–17, 28–25, 22–25
Pts: Swider (21); Rebs: Killeya-Jones (9); Asts: Pippen Jr. & McCoy (7 each)	Pts: Harper (20); Rebs: Jones (13); Asts: Petty Jr. & Seabron (6 each)

Thomas & Mack Center, Paradise, Nevada
Referees: Tyler Mirkovich, Kelsey Reynolds, Gina Catanzariti

==== Day 10 ====
NBA TV

July 16
3:00 pm

Boxscore

Atlanta Hawks 90, Cleveland Cavaliers 94
Scoring by quarter: 20–24, 20–20, 21–24, 29–26
Pts: Martin (21); Rebs: Golden (8); Asts: Martin (4)	Pts: Nembhard (16); Rebs: Mobley (10); Asts: Nembhard (6)

Cox Pavilion, Paradise, Nevada
Referees: Blanca Burns, Matt Rafferty, Kaitlyn Bunger

ESPNU

July 16
4:00 pm

Boxscore

Orlando Magic 86, Detroit Pistons 102
Scoring by quarter: 22–15, 19–25, 23–28, 22–34
Pts: James (18); Rebs: James, Simpson (5); Asts: Simpson (5)	Pts: Bernard (22); Rebs: Bernard (9); Asts: Moore (8)

Thomas & Mack Center, Paradise, Nevada
Referees: Biniam Maru, Nate Cearley, Shante Anderson

NBA TV

July 16
5:00 pm

Boxscore

Charlotte Hornets 86, Minnesota Timberwolves 89
Scoring by quarter: 21–18, 20–14, 18–31, 27–26
Pts: Thor (28); Rebs: Williams (7); Asts: Crutcher (7)	Pts: Harris (23); Rebs: Shayok (6); Asts: Shayok (10)

Cox Pavilion, Paradise, Nevada
Referees: Jenna Reneau, Omar Bermudez, Jason Alabanza

ESPN

July 16
6:00 pm

Boxscore

Memphis Grizzlies 87, San Antonio Spurs 90
Scoring by quarter: 22–17, 25–30, 12–21, 28–22
Pts: Lofton Jr. (27); Rebs: Lofton Jr. (12); Asts: Williams Jr. (6)	Pts: Branham (23); Rebs: Woodard (10); Asts: Wesley (5)

Thomas & Mack Center, Paradise, Nevada
Referees: Brent Haskill, Intae Hwang, Lauren Niemiera

NBA TV

July 16
7:00 pm

Boxscore

Chicago Bulls 119, Philadelphia 76ers 104
Scoring by quarter: 29–25, 29–23, 31–34, 30–22
Pts: Simonovic (26); Rebs: Simonovic (8); Asts: Jones (9)	Pts: Brown Jr. (21); Rebs: Queen (6); Asts: Brown Jr., Queen (4)

Cox Pavilion, Paradise, Nevada
Referees: Kelly Broomfield, Stephanie Barksdale, Ian McClenny

ESPN

July 16
8:00 pm

Boxscore

Brooklyn Nets 102, Boston Celtics 95
Scoring by quarter: 23–22, 23–30, 26–17, 30–26
Pts: Thomas (25); Rebs: Sharpe (10); Asts: Thomas (6)	Pts: Begarin (25); Rebs: Williams (9); Asts: Davison (10)

Thomas & Mack Center, Paradise, Nevada
Referees: Tyler Ricks, Ben Stirt, Maripier Malo

NBA TV

July 16
9:00 pm

Boxscore

Houston Rockets 81, Sacramento Kings 92
Scoring by quarter: 24–26, 15–19, 17–23, 25–24
Pts: Eason (19); Rebs: Smith (12); Asts: Washington (4)	Pts: Horne (20); Rebs: Rhoden (7); Asts: Steward (4)

Cox Pavilion, Paradise, Nevada
Referees: Pat OConnell, Marcy Williams, Josh Wilson

ESPN2

July 16
10:00 pm

Boxscore

Los Angeles Lakers 95, Dallas Mavericks 84
Pts: Swider (16); Rebs: Christie, White Jr. (6); Asts: Huff, Jones (4)	Pts: Lawson (19); Rebs: Wright (6); Asts: Harding (5)

Thomas & Mack Center, Paradise, Nevada

NBA TV

July 16
11:00 pm

Boxscore

Miami Heat 86, Los Angeles Clippers 83
Scoring by quarter: 22–21, 15–20, 18–22, 31–20
Pts: Allman Jr. (26); Rebs: Cain (11); Asts: Allman Jr. (6)	Pts: three players (16); Rebs: three players (6); Asts: Wallace (3)

Cox Pavilion, Paradise, Nevada
Referees: Agon Abazi, Ken Jones, Chelisa Painter

==== Day 11 ====
ESPN

July 17
3:00 pm

Boxscore

Portland Trail Blazers 85, New York Knicks 77
Scoring by quarter: 12–14, 29–16, 19–16, 25–31
Pts: Williams (22); Rebs: Walker (11); Asts: Williams (5)	Pts: Grimes (19); Rebs: McBride (6); Asts: three players (3)

Thomas & Mack Center, Paradise, Nevada
Referees: Matt Kallio, Jenna Reneau, J.D. Ralls

NBA TV

July 17
4:00 pm

Boxscore

Milwaukee Bucks 69, Toronto Raptors 80
Scoring by quarter: 16–18, 10–20, 15–21, 28–21
Pts: Wigginton (11); Rebs: Mamukelashvili (9); Asts: Francisco (4)	Pts: Kigab (15); Rebs: Kigab (10); Asts: Vital & Barcello (4)

Cox Pavilion, Paradise, Nevada
Referees: Blanca Burns, Maripier Malo, Shante Anderson

ESPNU

July 17
5:30 pm

Boxscore

Phoenix Suns 84, Indiana Pacers 69
Scoring by quarter: 20–11, 14–19, 30–18, 20–21
Pts: King (14); Rebs: King & Lual-Acuil (8); Asts: Wright IV (5)	Pts: three players (8); Rebs: Shittu (7); Asts: Nemhard (5)

Thomas & Mack Center, Paradise, Nevada
Referees: Clare Aubry, Stephanie Barksdale, Nate Anderson

NBA TV

July 17
6:00 pm

Boxscore

Oklahoma City Thunder 71, New Orleans Pelicans 107
Scoring by quarter: 21–30, 20–21, 13–28, 17–28
Pts: Brown (23); Rebs: Krejčí & Williams (8); Asts: Williams (8)	Pts: Butler (25); Rebs: Jones (11); Asts: Stewart (9)

Cox Pavilion, Paradise, Nevada
Referees: ShaRae Mitchell, Cameron Gelinas, Jacob Barnett

ESPN2

July 17
7:30 pm

Boxscore

Washington Wizards 87, Golden State Warriors 77
Scoring by quarter: 19–11, 18–31, 24–27, 26–8
Pts: Echenique (19); Rebs: Echenique (12); Asts: Spencer (7)	Pts: McClung (14); Rebs: Baba (9); Asts: McClung (6)

Thomas & Mack Center, Paradise, Nevada
Referees: Tyler Mirkovich, Biniam Maru, Grant Detrick

NBA TV

July 17
8:00 pm

Boxscore

Denver Nuggets 72, Utah Jazz 82
Scoring by quarter: 20–18, 12–26, 22–20, 18–18
Pts: Arms (20); Rebs: White (9); Asts: three players (2)	Pts: Butler (15); Rebs: Simanic (7); Asts: Butler (6)

Cox Pavilion, Paradise, Nevada
Referees: Julian McFadden, Nate Cearley, Klajdi Mulla
