= Silas Melson =

American basketball player (born 1996)

No. 2 – JDA Dijon
- Position: Point guard / shooting guard
- League: LNB Élite

Personal information
- Born: August 22, 1996 (age 30) Portland, Oregon, U.S.
- Listed height: 6 ft 4 in (1.93 m)
- Listed weight: 195 lb (88 kg)

Career information
- High school: Jefferson (Portland, Oregon)
- College: Gonzaga (2014–2018)
- NBA draft: 2018: undrafted
- Playing career: 2018–present

Career history
- 2018: Lavrio
- 2018–2019: Hapoel Be'er Sheva
- 2019–2020: Kouvot
- 2020–2021: Limburg United
- 2021–2022: BC Kalev
- 2022–2023: Petkim Spor
- 2023–2024: MHP Riesen Ludwigsburg
- 2024: Darüşşafaka
- 2025–2026: Filou Oostende
- 2026–present: JDA Dijon

Silas Antony Melson (born August 22, 1996) is an American professional basketball player for JDA Dijon of the LNB Élite. He played college basketball for the Gonzaga Bulldogs, where he was named All-West Coast Conference Honorable Mention in 2018. Standing at 6 ft 4 in (1.93 m), he plays at the point guard and shooting guard positions.

== Early life and college career ==
Melson attended Jefferson High School in Portland, Oregon, where he averaged 24.2 points, 6.0 rebounds, 3.3 assists and 1.5 steals. He led the Democrats to a 26–1 record and a second consecutive Class 5A state championship. On March 21, 2014, Melson was named Oregon Gatorade Player of the Year.

Melson played college basketball at Gonzaga University, where he finished his senior year averaging 9.2 points per game while shooting 40.8% of his shots from the field. On February 27, 2018, Melson was named All-WCC Honorable Mention.

== Professional career ==
On June 20, 2018, Melson started his professional career with Lavrio of the Greek Basket League. On November 11, 2018, Melson recorded a season-high 23 points, shooting 9-of-13 from the field in a 63–102 loss to Olympiacos.

On December 23, 2018, Melson signed a one-month contract with Hapoel Be'er Sheva of the Israeli Premier League as an injury cover for Semaj Christon. On January 28, 2019, Melson recorded 20 points, shooting 4-of-5 from three-point range, leading Be'er Sheva to an 87–74 win over Bnei Herzliya. On February 21, 2019, Melson parted ways with Be'er Sheva after appearing in eight games.

On August 5, 2019, Melson signed a one-year deal with Polpharma Starogard of the Polish Basketball League. He averaged 20.8 points, 4.1 rebounds and 2.5 assists per game.

On June 16, 2020, Melson signed with Limburg United of the Pro Basketball League. He averaged 16.8 points, 3.0 rebounds, 1.9 assists and 1.2 steals per game.

On July 29, 2021, Melson signed with Kalev/Cramo of the Latvian–Estonian Basketball League.

On June 13, 2022, Melson signed with Petkim Spor of the Turkish Basketball Super League. He tore his Achilles tendon after three games with the team and missed the rest of the season. Melson averaged 16.0 points, 4.0 rebounds and 3.7 assists during his stint with Petkim Spor.

On October 10, 2023, Melson signed a one-year contract with MHP Riesen Ludwigsburg of the Basketball Bundesliga and the Basketball Champions League (BCL).

On June 21, 2024, Melson signed with Darüşşafaka of the Basketbol Süper Ligi (BSL). On October 6, during the opening game of the season, he tore his Achilles tendon for a second time and was ruled out for the rest of the season.

On July 6, 2026, he signed with JDA Dijon of the LNB Élite.

== Personal life ==
Melson and his partner had a son born during the 2022–23 season.
