= Tari Eason =

American basketball player (born 2001)

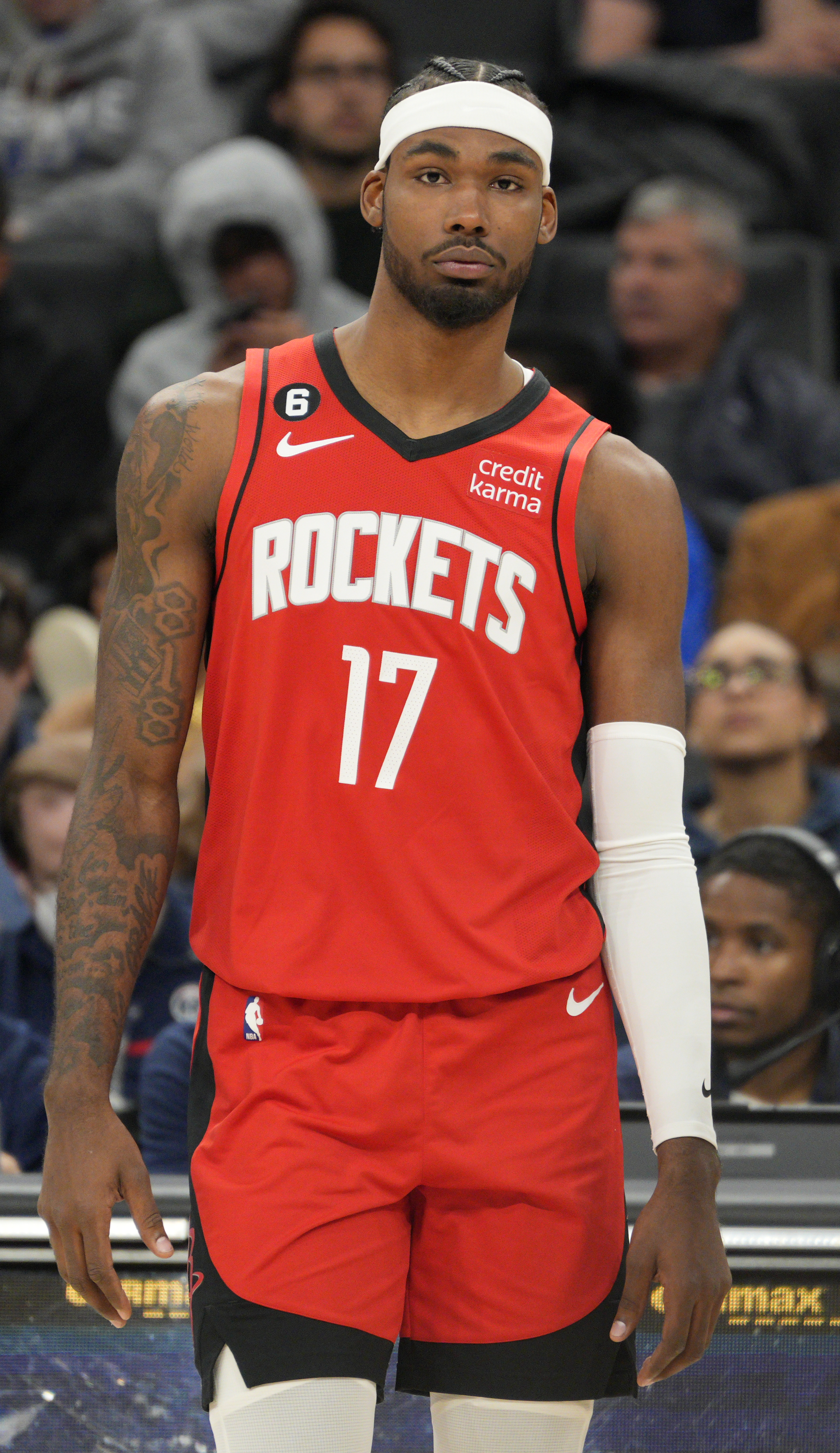
- Eason with the Houston Rockets in 2023

No. 17 – Houston Rockets
- Position: Power forward
- League: NBA

Personal information
- Born: May 10, 2001 (age 25) Portsmouth, Virginia, U.S.
- Listed height: 6 ft 8 in (2.03 m)
- Listed weight: 229 lb (104 kg)

Career information
- High school: Garfield (Seattle, Washington); Federal Way (Federal Way, Washington)
- College: Cincinnati (2020–2021); LSU (2021–2022)
- NBA draft: 2022: 1st round, 17th overall pick
- Drafted by: Houston Rockets
- Playing career: 2022–present

Career history
- 2022–present: Houston Rockets

Career highlights
- NBA All-Rookie Second Team (2023); SEC Sixth Man of the Year (2022); First-team All-SEC (2022); AAC All-Freshman Team (2021)
- Stats at NBA.com
- Stats at Basketball Reference

Tari Jordan Eason (/ˈtɑːri ˈiːsən/ TAR-ee EE-sən; born May 10, 2001) is an American professional basketball player for the Houston Rockets of the National Basketball Association (NBA). He played college basketball for the Cincinnati Bearcats and the LSU Tigers. Eason was selected 17th overall in the 2022 NBA draft by the Houston Rockets.

== High school career ==
Eason started his high school career at Garfield High School in Seattle, Washington under head coach Brandon Roy, and played sparingly during his first two years. For his junior season, he transferred to Federal Way High School in Federal Way, Washington, where he played alongside top recruit Jaden McDaniels. Eason returned to Garfield for his senior season as Roy came back following a one-year break. He led his team to a 3A state title, recording 21 points and 14 rebounds against Paolo Banchero and O'Dea High School in the final, and received tournament MVP. Eason averaged 23 points, eight rebounds, and three steals per game as a senior, and was named 3A Player of the Year. A four-star recruit, he committed to playing college basketball for Cincinnati over offers from Colorado and USC.

== College career ==
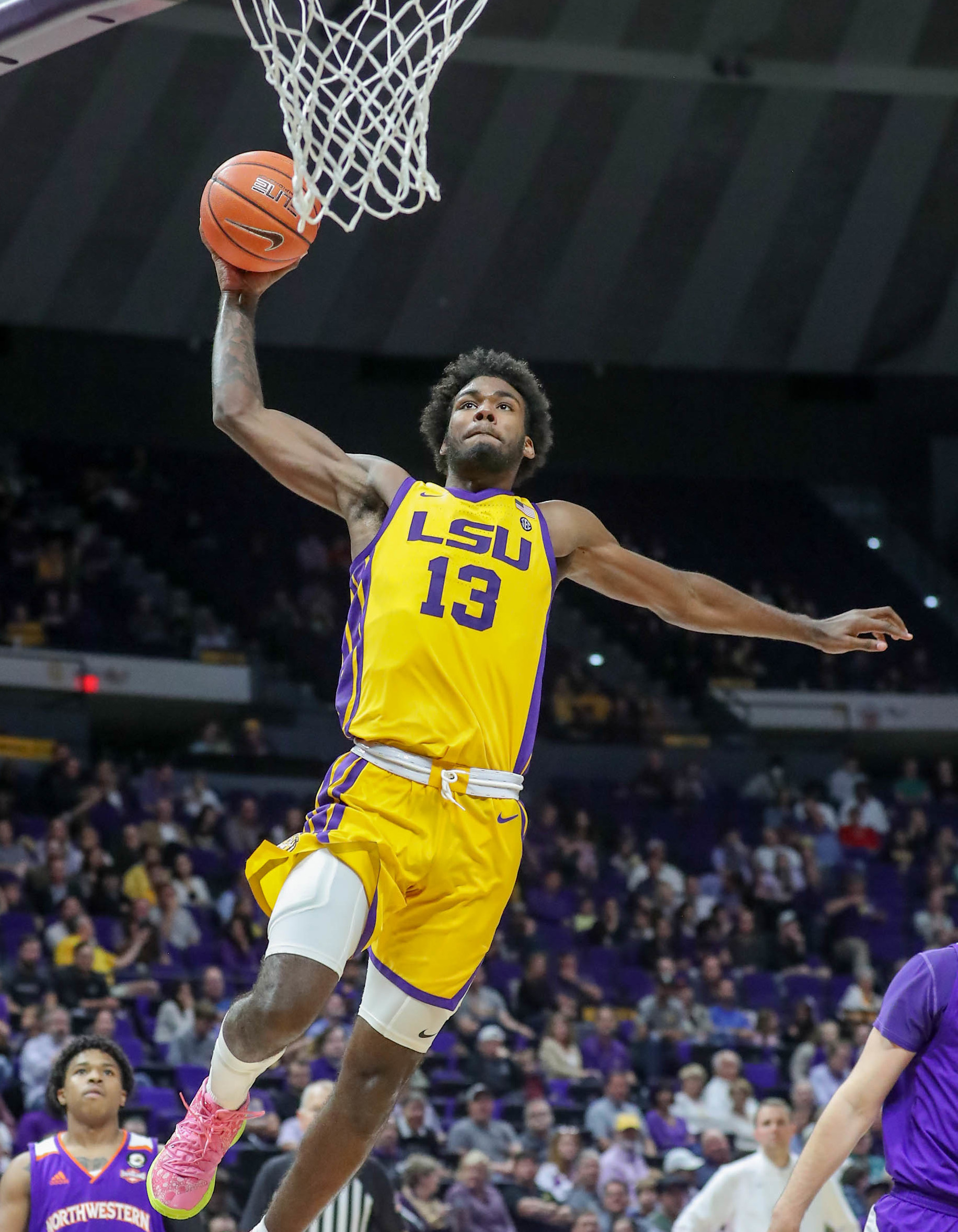
Eason with LSU in 2021

On February 26, 2021, Eason posted a freshman season-high 20 points, 13 rebounds, and three blocks in a 91–71 win over Tulane. As a freshman at Cincinnati, he averaged 7.3 points, 5.9 rebounds, 1.3 blocks, and 1.2 steals per game, earning American Athletic Conference All-Freshman Team honors. For his sophomore season, Eason transferred to LSU. He was named to the First Team All-SEC as well as SEC Sixth Man of the Year. Eason averaged 16.9 points, 6.6 rebounds, and 1.9 steals per game. On March 25, 2022, he declared for the 2022 NBA draft, forgoing his remaining college eligibility.

== Professional career ==
=== Houston Rockets (2022–present) ===
Eason was selected with the 17th overall pick by the Houston Rockets in the 2022 NBA draft. Eason joined the Rockets' 2022 NBA Summer League roster. In his Summer League debut, Eason tallied 14 points and 13 rebounds in a 77–91 win over the Orlando Magic. On July 18, 2022, Eason was named to the All-NBA Summer League First Team, averaging 17.2 points on 44.7 percent shooting from the field along with 1.8 steals and a block. On October 2, Eason made his preseason debut, scoring 21 points off the bench in addition to securing ten rebounds, two assists, two steals, and one block in a 134–96 win against the San Antonio Spurs. On October 19, 2022, he made his NBA debut with an 8-point and 7-rebound performance in a 117–107 loss to the Atlanta Hawks.

On February 1, 2023, Eason scored a career-high 20 points with 13 rebounds (12 of them being offensive rebounds) and three steals in only 19 minutes of play in a 112–106 win against the Oklahoma City Thunder. On February 23, his hard foul on Vince Williams caused a season ending injury.

On July 2, 2026, Eason re-signed on a five-year, $81.5 million contract to stay with the Rockets.

== Personal life ==
Eason has three siblings. While at LSU, he majored in interdisciplinary studies.

== Career statistics ==
Legend
GP	Games played	GS	Games started	MPG	Minutes per game
FG%	Field goal percentage	3P%	3-point field goal percentage	FT%	Free throw percentage
RPG	Rebounds per game	APG	Assists per game	SPG	Steals per game
BPG	Blocks per game	PPG	Points per game	**Bold**	Career high

=== NBA ===
==== Regular season ====
Year	Team	GP	GS	MPG	FG%	3P%	FT%	RPG	APG	SPG	BPG	PPG
2022–23	Houston	**82**	5	21.6	.448	.343	.752	6.0	1.1	1.2	.6	9.3
2023–24	Houston	22	0	21.8	.466	**.360**	.636	**7.0**	1.2	1.4	**.9**	9.8
2024–25	Houston	57	16	24.9	**.487**	.342	.760	6.4	**1.5**	**1.7**	**.9**	**12.0**
2025–26	Houston	60	**34**	**25.8**	.416	.358	**.776**	6.3	**1.5**	1.2	.5	10.5
Career		221	55	23.6	.451	.350	.748	6.3	1.3	1.3	.7	10.4

==== Playoffs ====
Year	Team	GP	GS	MPG	FG%	3P%	FT%	RPG	APG	SPG	BPG	PPG
2025	Houston	**7**	0	18.9	**.477**	**.368**	.500	4.3	.7	1.1	**1.0**	7.6
2026	Houston	6	**4**	**32.5**	**.477**	.333	**.846**	**6.7**	**1.7**	**2.5**	.7	**13.8**
Career		13	4	25.2	.477	.347	.714	5.4	1.2	1.8	.8	10.5

=== College ===
Year	Team	GP	GS	MPG	FG%	3P%	FT%	RPG	APG	SPG	BPG	PPG
2020–21	Cincinnati	23	**8**	19.6	.462	.241	.574	5.9	**1.3**	1.2	**1.3**	7.3
2021–22	LSU	**33**	4	**24.4**	**.521**	**.359**	**.803**	**6.6**	1.0	**1.9**	1.1	**16.9**
Career		56	12	22.4	.504	.327	.757	6.3	1.1	1.6	1.2	13.0
