= Isaiah Crawford =

American basketball player (born 2001)

No. 27 – Houston Rockets
- Position: Small forward
- League: NBA

Personal information
- Born: November 1, 2001 (age 25) Fort Worth, Texas, U.S.
- Listed height: 6 ft 6 in (1.98 m)
- Listed weight: 225 lb (102 kg)

Career information
- High school: North Crowley (Fort Worth, Texas)
- College: Louisiana Tech (2019–2024)
- NBA draft: 2024: undrafted
- Playing career: 2024–present

Career history
- 2024–2025: Sacramento Kings
- 2024–2025: →Stockton Kings
- 2025–present: Houston Rockets
- 2025–2026: →Rio Grande Valley Vipers

Career highlights
- NBA G League champion (2025); Conference USA Player of the Year (2024); First-team All-Conference USA (2024); 2× Third-team All-Conference USA (2021, 2023); Conference USA Defensive Player of the Year (2024); Conference USA All-Defensive team (2024)
- Stats at NBA.com
- Stats at Basketball Reference

Isaiah Jordan Crawford (born November 1, 2001) is an American professional basketball player for the Houston Rockets of the National Basketball Association (NBA). He played college basketball for the Louisiana Tech Bulldogs. Crawford has also previously been on a two-way contract with the Rio Grande Valley Vipers of the NBA G League.

== College career ==
Crawford, a small forward from Fort Worth, Texas, came to Louisiana Tech from North Crowley High School. He broke into the Bulldogs' starting lineup six games into his first year but his season ended abruptly due to an anterior cruciate ligament (ACL) injury. He returned to the team for his sophomore season, establishing himself a third-team All-Conference USA pick after averaging 11.8 points and 5.4 rebounds per game. Just two games into his junior season, Crawford suffered a second ACL injury to the same knee and missed the rest of the season.

After a year of rehabilitation, Crawford returned to the Bulldogs for the 2022–23 season. He picked up where he left off, averaging 13.7 points per game to lead the team and was again named third-team all-conference.

At the start of the 2023–24 season, Crawford was named the preseason Conference USA Player of the Year. After averaging career highs in points (16.3 per game) and rebounding (6.2 per game) and leading the Bulldogs to a second-place finish, Crawford was named the league's 2024 Player of the Year.

== Professional career ==
After going undrafted in the 2024 NBA draft, Crawford signed a two-way contract with the Sacramento Kings on July 3, 2024. Crawford made 15 appearances for Sacramento during his rookie campaign, recording averages of 0.9 points, 0.5 rebounds, and 0.1 assists.

On July 26, 2025, Crawford signed a two-way contract with the Houston Rockets. He made 14 appearances for Houston during the 2025–26 NBA season, averaging 2.0 points, 1.1 rebounds, and 0.4 assists. On July 23, 2026, Crawford signed with the Rockets on a standard non - guaranteed contract.

== Career statistics ==
Legend
GP	Games played	GS	Games started	MPG	Minutes per game
FG%	Field goal percentage	3P%	3-point field goal percentage	FT%	Free throw percentage
RPG	Rebounds per game	APG	Assists per game	SPG	Steals per game
BPG	Blocks per game	PPG	Points per game	**Bold**	Career high

=== NBA ===
Year	Team	GP	GS	MPG	FG%	3P%	FT%	RPG	APG	SPG	BPG	PPG
2024–25	Sacramento	**15**	0	3.1	**.455**	.200	.500	.5	.1	**.1**	.1	.9
2025–26	Houston	14	0	**6.6**	.417	**.231**	**.833**	**1.1**	**.4**	**.1**	**.2**	**2.0**
Career		29	0	4.8	.429	.222	.700	.8	.2	.1	.2	1.4

=== College ===
Year	Team	GP	GS	MPG	FG%	3P%	FT%	RPG	APG	SPG	BPG	PPG
2019–20	Louisiana Tech	16	10	21.5	.484	.323	.608	4.3	1.5	1.4	.1	8.3
2020–21	Louisiana Tech	**32**	21	26.1	.489	.381	.659	5.1	1.8	1.0	.7	11.8
2021–22	Louisiana Tech	3	3	21.7	**.519**	.200	.714	4.7	1.7	1.3	.3	11.3
2022–23	Louisiana Tech	**32**	**32**	29.8	.495	**.420**	.727	5.3	**2.7**	1.9	.7	13.7
2023–24	Louisiana Tech	**32**	**32**	**32.9**	.485	.414	**.728**	**6.2**	2.4	**2.1**	**1.7**	**16.3**
Career		115	98	28.2	.490	.393	.699	5.3	2.2	1.6	.9	13.1
