= 2017–18 West Coast Conference men's basketball season =

- League: NCAA Division I
- Sport: Men's basketball
- Teams: 10

Regular season
- Season champions: Gonzaga
- Season MVP: Jock Landale, Saint Mary's

Tournament
- Champions: Gonzaga
- Runners-up: BYU
- Finals MVP: Killian Tillie - Gonzaga

Basketball seasons
- ← 2016–17 2018–19 →

2017–18 West Coast Conference men's basketball standings
	Conf.				Overall
Team	W		L	PCT	W		L	PCT
No. 8 Gonzaga †	17	–	1	.944	32	–	5	.865
No. 25 Saint Mary's	16	–	2	.889	30	–	6	.833
BYU	11	–	7	.611	24	–	11	.686
San Diego	9	–	9	.500	20	–	14	.588
San Francisco	9	–	9	.500	22	–	17	.564
Pacific	9	–	9	.500	14	–	18	.438
Santa Clara	8	–	10	.444	11	–	20	.355
Loyola Marymount	5	–	13	.278	11	–	20	.355
Portland	4	–	14	.222	10	–	22	.313
Pepperdine	2	–	16	.111	6	–	26	.188
† Conference tournament winner Rankings from AP poll

The 2017–18 West Coast Conference men's basketball season began with practices in September 2017 and ended with the 2018 West Coast Conference men's basketball tournament March 2018. This was the 67th season for WCC men's basketball, and the 29th under its current name of "West Coast Conference". The conference was founded in 1952 as the California Basketball Association, became the West Coast Athletic Conference in 1956, and dropped the word "Athletic" in 1989.

== Head coaches ==
=== Coaches ===
Team	Head coach	Previous job	Years at school	Overall record	WCC record	WCC Tournament record	NCAA Tournaments	Sweet Sixteens
BYU	Dave Rose	Dixie State	13	283–99 (.741)	61–25 (.709)	6–5 (.545)	8	1
Gonzaga	Mark Few	Gonzaga (asst.)	19	466–111 (.808)	226–28 (.890)	36–4 (.900)	17	6
Loyola Marymount	Mike Dunlap	Charlotte Bobcats	4	22–40 (.355)	10–26 (.278)	1–2 (.333)	0	0
Pacific	Damon Stoudamire	Memphis Grizzlies (asst.)	2	0–0 (–)	0–0 (–)	0–0 (–)	0	0
Pepperdine	Marty Wilson	Pepperdine (assoc.)	8	76–91 (.455)	39–61 (.390)	3–6 (.333)	0	0
Portland	Terry Porter	N/A	2	0–0 (–)	0–0 (–)	0–0 (–)	0	0
Saint Mary's	Randy Bennett	Saint Louis (asst.)	17	333–131 (.718)	154–68 (.694)	17–13 (.567)	5	1
San Diego	Lamont Smith	New Mexico (asst.)	3	9–21 (.300)	4–14 (.222)	0–1 (.000)	0	0
San Francisco	Kyle Smith	Columbia	2	0–0 (–)	0–0 (–)	0–0 (–)	0	0
Santa Clara	Herb Sendek	Arizona State	2	0–0 (–)	0–0 (–)	0–0 (–)	8	1

Notes:

- Year at school includes 2017–18 season.
- Overall and WCC records are from time at current school and are through the beginning of the 2017–18 season.

== Rankings ==
Legend
	Improvement in ranking
	Drop in ranking
	Not ranked previous week
RV	Received votes but were not ranked in Top 25 of poll
(Italics)	Number of first place votes

		Pre/ Wk 1	Wk 2	Wk 3	Wk 4	Wk 5	Wk 6	Wk 7	Wk 8	Wk 9	Wk 10	Wk 11	Wk 12	Wk 13	Wk 14	Wk 15	Wk 16	Wk 17	Wk 18	Wk 19	Post
BYU	AP																				
BYU	C																				
Gonzaga	AP																				
Gonzaga	C																				
Loyola Marymount	AP																				
Loyola Marymount	C																				
Pacific	AP																				
Pacific	C																				
Pepperdine	AP																				
Pepperdine	C																				
Portland	AP																				
Portland	C																				
Saint Mary's	AP																				
Saint Mary's	C																				
San Diego	AP																				
San Diego	C																				
San Francisco	AP																				
San Francisco	C																				
Santa Clara	AP																				
Santa Clara	C																				

== All-WCC awards and teams ==
On February 27, the conference announced conference awards.

Honor	Recipient
Player of the Year	Jock Landale, Saint Mary's
Coach of the Year	Mark Few, Gonzaga
Newcomer of the Year	Zach Norvell Jr., Gonzaga
Defensive Player of the Year	Namdi Okonkwo, Pacific
All-WCC First Team	Elijah Bryant, BYU
All-WCC First Team	Yoeli Childs, BYU
All-WCC First Team	K. J. Feagin, Santa Clara
All-WCC First Team	Frankie Ferrari, San Francisco
All-WCC First Team	Rui Hachimura, Gonzaga
All-WCC First Team	Jock Landale, Saint Mary's
All-WCC First Team	Emmett Naar, Saint Mary's
All-WCC First Team	Josh Perkins, Gonzaga
All-WCC First Team	Isaiah Pineiro, San Diego
All-WCC First Team	Johnathan Williams, Gonzaga
All-WCC Second Team	James Batemon, Loyola Marymount
All-WCC Second Team	Calvin Hermanson, Saint Mary's
All-WCC Second Team	Killian Tillie, Gonzaga
All-WCC Second Team	Jahlil Tripp, Pacific
All-WCC Second Team	Isaiah Wright, San Diego
All-WCC Freshman Team	Souley Boum, San Francisco
All-WCC Freshman Team	Zach Norvell Jr., Gonzaga
All-WCC Freshman Team	Colbey Ross, Pepperdine
All-WCC Freshman Team	Eli Scott, Loyola Marymount
All-WCC Freshman Team	Marcus Shaver, Portland
All-WCC Honorable Mention	Olin Carter III, San Diego
All-WCC Honorable Mention	Roberto Gallinat, Pacific
All-WCC Honorable Mention	T. J. Haws, BYU
All-WCC Honorable Mention	Silas Melson, Gonzaga
All-WCC Honorable Mention	Zach Norvell Jr., Gonzaga
All-WCC Honorable Mention	Miles Reynolds, Pacific
All-WCC Honorable Mention	Colbey Ross, Pepperdine
All-WCC Honorable Mention	Marcus Shaver, Portland

== See also ==
- 2017–18 NCAA Division I men's basketball season
- West Coast Conference men's basketball tournament
- 2017–18 West Coast Conference women's basketball season
- West Coast Conference women's basketball tournament
- 2018 West Coast Conference women's basketball tournament
