= Reed Sheppard =

American basketball player (born 2004)

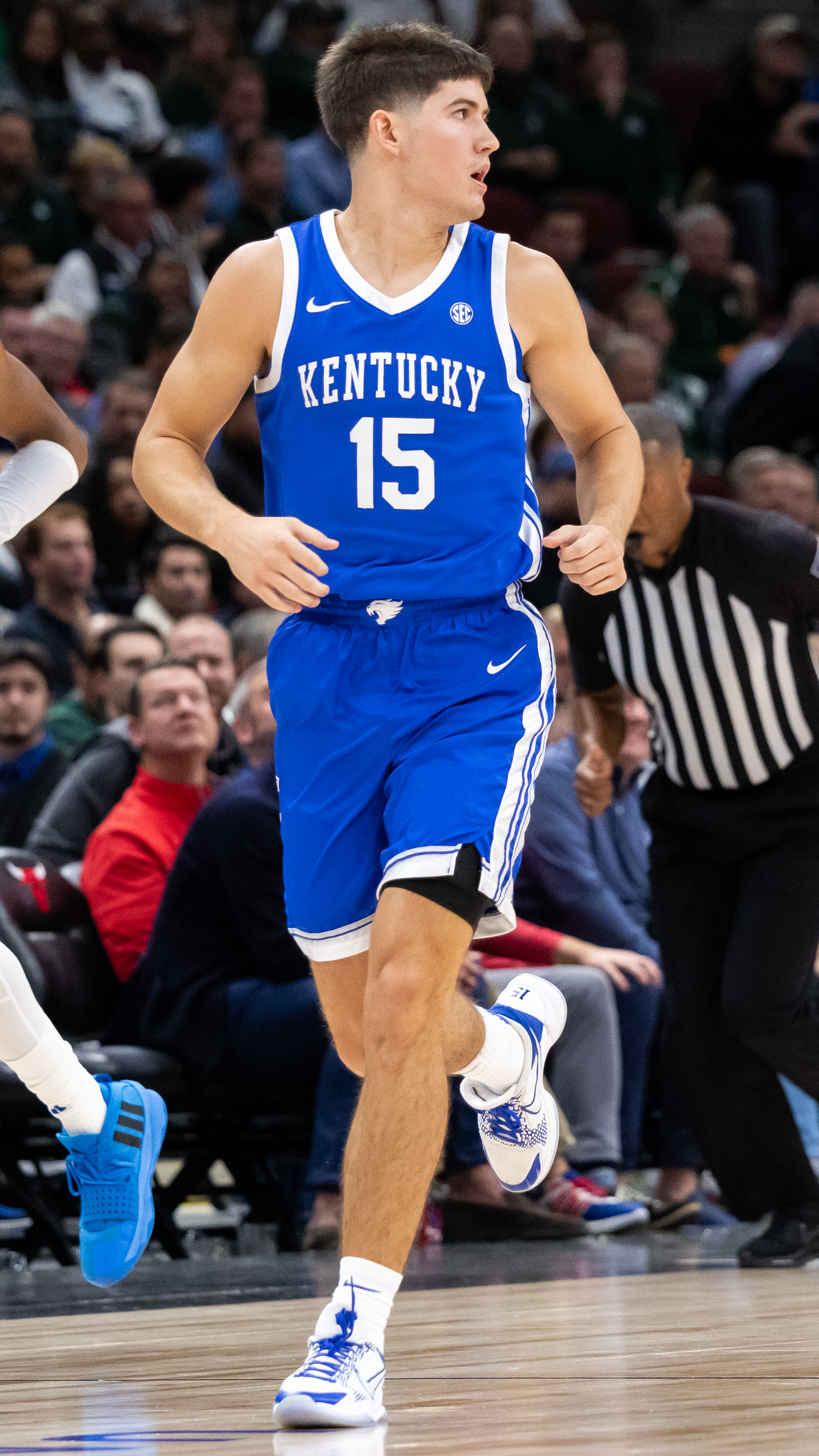
- Sheppard with Kentucky in 2023

No. 15 – Houston Rockets
- Position: Shooting guard / point guard
- League: NBA

Personal information
- Born: June 24, 2004 (age 22) London, Kentucky, U.S.
- Listed height: 6 ft 2 in (1.88 m)
- Listed weight: 189 lb (86 kg)

Career information
- High school: North Laurel (London, Kentucky)
- College: Kentucky (2023–2024)
- NBA draft: 2024: 1st round, 3rd overall pick
- Drafted by: Houston Rockets
- Playing career: 2024–present

Career history
- 2024–present: Houston Rockets
- 2025: →Rio Grande Valley Vipers

Career highlights
- USBWA Freshman of the Year (2024); NABC Freshman of the Year (2024); SEC Freshman of the Year (2024); Second-team All-SEC (2024); McDonald's All-American (2023); Kentucky Mr. Basketball (2023)
- Stats at NBA.com
- Stats at Basketball Reference

Isaiah Reed Sheppard (born June 24, 2004) is an American professional basketball player for the Houston Rockets of the National Basketball Association (NBA). He played college basketball for the Kentucky Wildcats. He was a consensus four-star recruit and one of the top players in the 2023 class. Sheppard was drafted as the 3rd pick in the 2024 NBA draft by the Houston Rockets.

== Early life and high school career ==
Sheppard grew up in London, Kentucky and attended North Laurel High School. He became North Laurel's starting shooting guard as a freshman and averaged 20.6 points per game. Sheppard led the state of Kentucky in scoring during his sophomore season after averaging 30.1 points per game in 28 games played. He was named the Kentucky Gatorade Player of the Year as a junior after averaging 25.5 points, 7.6 assists, 6.8 rebounds and 4.4 steals per game. Sheppard was selected to play in the 2023 McDonald's All-American Boys Game during his senior year. He was named Kentucky Mr. Basketball after averaging 22.5 points, 8.5 assists and 8.4 rebounds per game. Sheppard finished his high school career with 3,727 points, 1,214 assists and 1,050 rebounds.

=== Recruiting ===
Sheppard was considered a top-50 prospect in the 2023 class. On November 20, 2021, he committed to playing college basketball for Kentucky over offers from Louisville and Virginia.

College recruiting
| Name | Hometown | School | Height | Weight | Commit date |
|---|---|---|---|---|---|
| Reed Sheppard; SG | London, KY | North Laurel (KY) | 6 ft 3 in (1.91 m) | 170 lb (77 kg) | Nov 20, 2021 |
| Reed Sheppard; SG | Recruit ratings: Rivals: 247Sports: ESPN: (89) | | | | |
Overall recruit ranking: Rivals: 28 247Sports: 79 ESPN: 23
Note: In many cases, Scout, Rivals, 247Sports, On3, and ESPN may conflict in their listings of height and weight.; In these cases, the average was taken. ESPN grades are on a 100-point scale.; Sources: "Kentucky 2023 Basketball Commitments". Rivals.; "2023 Kentucky Wildcats Recruiting Class". ESPN.; "2023 Team Ranking". Rivals.

== College career ==
Sheppard enrolled at the University of Kentucky in June 2023, shortly after graduating from high school. He was assigned jersey number 15, his father's number. During the summer before his freshman year Sheppard played for the Wildcats in the GLOBL JAM tournament in Canada and averaged 8.5 points, 5.8 assists, 1.8 steals and 1.3 blocks per game over four games as the team went undefeated and won the tournament.

After the regular season, Sheppard was named SEC Freshman of the Year by the conference coaches. (Note: The Freshman of the Year award is one of two awards presented to the top player in his first season of SEC play. Associated Press writers who cover SEC men's basketball vote on a Newcomer of the Year award, open to any player in his first season of SEC play regardless of academic classification. The AP award went to Dalton Knecht, a fifth-year senior who transferred from Northern Colorado to Tennessee after the 2022–23 season and was named SEC Player of the Year by both the coaches and the AP.)

At the end of the season, Sheppard was named the national freshman of the year by both the United States Basketball Writers Association and the National Association of Basketball Coaches.

On April 18, 2024, Sheppard announced that he would declare for the 2024 NBA draft and forgo his remaining college eligibility.

== Professional career ==
Sheppard was selected with the third overall pick by the Houston Rockets in the 2024 NBA draft. He signed a rookie-scale contract with the team on July 3, 2024. Sheppard made his NBA debut on October 23, 2024, in a 110–105 loss to the Charlotte Hornets, scoring four points. On January 6, 2025, he was assigned to the Rio Grande Valley Vipers. He was recalled to the Rockets after 3 games in the G League with an increased role, including a then-career high of 25 points against the Oklahoma City Thunder on March 3, 2025, in his first NBA start. Following starting guard Fred VanVleet's Achilles injury leaving him sidelined for the 2025–26 NBA season, Sheppard assumed a larger offensive role off the bench. On November 26, 2025, Sheppard recorded a career-high 31 points in a 104–100 win against the Golden State Warriors. On April 1, 2026, Sheppard put up 27 points on a career-high nine three-pointers made in a 119–113 win over the Milwaukee Bucks. Appearing in all 82 games (including 21 starts) for Houston, Sheppard logged averages of 13.5 points, 2.9 rebounds, and 3.4 assists.

== Career statistics ==
Legend
| GP | Games played | GS | Games started | MPG | Minutes per game |
| FG% | Field goal percentage | 3P% | 3-point field goal percentage | FT% | Free throw percentage |
| RPG | Rebounds per game | APG | Assists per game | SPG | Steals per game |
| BPG | Blocks per game | PPG | Points per game | **Bold** | Career high |
| * | Led the league |

=== NBA ===
==== Regular season ====
| Year | Team | GP | GS | MPG | FG% | 3P% | FT% | RPG | APG | SPG | BPG | PPG |
|---|---|---|---|---|---|---|---|---|---|---|---|---|
| 2024–25 | Houston | 52 | 3 | 12.6 | .351 | .338 | **.813** | 1.5 | 1.4 | .7 | .3 | 4.4 |
| 2025–26 | Houston | **82*** | **21** | **26.2** | **.430** | **.394** | .802 | **2.9** | **3.4** | **1.5** | **.7** | **13.5** |
| Career | | 134 | 24 | 20.9 | .414 | .383 | .804 | 2.4 | 2.6 | 1.2 | .5 | 10.0 |

==== Playoffs ====
| Year | Team | GP | GS | MPG | FG% | 3P% | FT% | RPG | APG | SPG | BPG | PPG |
|---|---|---|---|---|---|---|---|---|---|---|---|---|
| 2025 | Houston | 3 | 0 | 3.3 | .000 | .000 | — | .3 | .3 | .7 | .3 | .0 |
| 2026 | Houston | **6** | **5** | **32.0** | **.307** | **.296** | **.750** | **1.0** | **4.7** | **2.2** | **.8** | **12.2** |
| Career | | 9 | 5 | 22.4 | .300 | .286 | .750 | .8 | 3.2 | 1.7 | .7 | 8.1 |

=== College ===
| Year | Team | GP | GS | MPG | FG% | 3P% | FT% | RPG | APG | SPG | BPG | PPG |
|---|---|---|---|---|---|---|---|---|---|---|---|---|
| 2023–24 | Kentucky | 33 | 5 | 28.9 | .536 | .521 | .831 | 4.1 | 4.5 | 2.5 | .7 | 12.5 |

== Personal life ==
Sheppard's father, Jeff Sheppard, played college basketball at Kentucky and was the Most Outstanding Player of the 1998 NCAA tournament and later played in 18 games during the 1998–99 NBA season for the Atlanta Hawks. His mother, the former Stacey Reed, also played basketball at Kentucky and scored over 1,400 career points. Sheppard's older sister, Madison, played college basketball at Campbellsville University.
