= 2025–26 Houston Rockets season =

- Head coach: Ime Udoka
- President: Gretchen Sheirr
- General manager: Rafael Stone
- Owner: Tilman Fertitta
- Arena: Toyota Center

Results
- Record: 52–30 (.634)
- Place: Division: 2nd (Southwest); Conference: 5th (Western)
- Playoff finish: First round (lost to Lakers 2–4)
- Stats at Basketball Reference

Local media
- Television: Space City Home Network
- Radio: Sportstalk 790

The 2025–26 Houston Rockets season was the 59th season of the franchise in the National Basketball Association (NBA) and 55th season in the city of Houston.

On June 22, 2025, the Rockets announced a trade with the Phoenix Suns involving Kevin Durant in exchange for Jalen Green, Dillon Brooks, and a first-round pick in the 2025 NBA draft from the Brooklyn Nets. The Suns also received five second-round picks, including one acquired by Houston from the Oklahoma City Thunder in the 2025 draft. The Rockets started off the season 2–2, but would eventually improve on that record later on, getting their 10th win after only 13 games, which represented their best regular season opener record since their 15–0 record from the 1993–94 season.

In February, the team experienced inner turmoil when it was alleged that star Kevin Durant was criticizing teammates through a burner account. Durant shut down the locker room drama, but never denied the rumors. Despite this, the team finished the season winning 9 of 10 games.

The Rockets clinched a playoff spot for the second consecutive season on April 2 when the Suns lost to the Charlotte Hornets. They would finish the regular season with a 52–30 record, placing 5th in the West. However, the Rockets were upset by the short-handed Los Angeles Lakers in six games of the first round.

== Draft ==
Round	Pick	Player	Position	Nationality	College
1	10	Khaman Maluach	Center	South Sudan	Duke
2	59	Jahmai Mashack	Shooting Guard	United States	Tennessee

The Rockets entered the 2025 NBA draft holding one first-round pick and one second-round pick, both of which acquired through previous trades. They had traded their original selections to the Brooklyn Nets and Memphis Grizzlies, respectively. The team's acquired first-round pick originated from the Phoenix Suns as part of the trade that sent Kevin Durant to Phoenix, with Houston acquiring that selection along with two other first-round picks from the Suns via the Brooklyn Nets. The team's acquired second-round pick, which was slated to be the final selection of the draft following the New York Knicks’ forfeiture of their pick due to free agency violations, originally belonged to the Oklahoma City Thunder and acquired through the Atlanta Hawks.

On June 22, the Rockets agreed to trade both of their 2025 draft selections, along with Jalen Green, Dillon Brooks, and four additional second-round picks, to the Suns in exchange for Durant. Thus by the conclusion of the draft, Houston joined the Denver Nuggets as one of only two teams without a retained draft pick for 2025.

== Roster ==
2025–26 Houston Rockets roster
Players

Pos.	No.	Player	Height	Weight	DOB	From
C	12	Steven Adams (injured)	6 ft 11 in (2.11 m)	265 lb (120 kg)	1993-07-20	Pittsburgh
C	30	Clint Capela	6 ft 10 in (2.08 m)	256 lb (116 kg)	1994-05-18	Switzerland
F	27	Isaiah Crawford (TW)	6 ft 6 in (1.98 m)	220 lb (100 kg)	2001-11-01	Louisiana Tech
G	4	JD Davison	6 ft 1 in (1.85 m)	195 lb (88 kg)	2002-10-03	Alabama
F	7	Kevin Durant	6 ft 11 in (2.11 m)	240 lb (109 kg)	1988-09-29	Texas
F	17	Tari Eason	6 ft 8 in (2.03 m)	215 lb (98 kg)	2001-05-10	LSU
F	2	Dorian Finney-Smith	6 ft 7 in (2.01 m)	220 lb (100 kg)	1993-05-04	Florida
F	32	Jeff Green	6 ft 8 in (2.03 m)	235 lb (107 kg)	1986-08-28	Georgetown
G	0	Aaron Holiday	6 ft 0 in (1.83 m)	185 lb (84 kg)	1996-09-30	UCLA
G	00	Tristen Newton (TW)	6 ft 5 in (1.96 m)	190 lb (86 kg)	2001-04-26	Connecticut
G	20	Josh Okogie	6 ft 4 in (1.93 m)	213 lb (97 kg)	1998-09-01	Georgia Tech
F/C	28	Alperen Şengün	6 ft 11 in (2.11 m)	243 lb (110 kg)	2002-07-25	Turkey
G	15	Reed Sheppard	6 ft 2 in (1.88 m)	185 lb (84 kg)	2004-06-24	Kentucky
F	10	Jabari Smith Jr.	6 ft 11 in (2.11 m)	220 lb (100 kg)	2003-05-13	Auburn
F	8	Jae'Sean Tate	6 ft 4 in (1.93 m)	230 lb (104 kg)	1995-10-28	Ohio State
G/F	1	Amen Thompson	6 ft 7 in (2.01 m)	200 lb (91 kg)	2003-01-30	Pine Crest (FL)
G	5	Fred VanVleet (injured)	6 ft 0 in (1.83 m)	197 lb (89 kg)	1994-02-25	Wichita State

Coaches
Head coach
- Ime Udoka
Assistant(s)
- Josh Bostic
- Will Dunn
- Cam Hodges
- Royal Ivey
- Garrett Jackson
- Robbie Lemons
- Ben Sullivan

Legend
- (DP) Unsigned draft pick
- (FA) Free agent
- (S) Suspended
- (GL) On assignment to G League affiliate
- (TW) Two-way affiliate player
- Injured

Roster
Updated: March 24, 2026

== Standings ==
=== Division ===
Southwest Division	W	L	PCT	GB	Home	Road	Div	GP
y – San Antonio Spurs	62	20	.756	–	32‍–‍8	30‍–‍12	13‍–‍3	82
x – Houston Rockets	52	30	.634	10.0	30‍–‍11	22‍–‍19	10‍–‍6	82
New Orleans Pelicans	26	56	.317	36.0	17‍–‍24	9‍–‍32	7‍–‍9	82
Dallas Mavericks	26	56	.317	36.0	16‍–‍25	10‍–‍31	4‍–‍12	82
Memphis Grizzlies	25	57	.305	37.0	14‍–‍27	11‍–‍30	6‍–‍10	82

=== Conference ===
Western Conference
#	Team	W	L	PCT	GB	GP
1	z – Oklahoma City Thunder *	64	18	.780	–	82
2	y – San Antonio Spurs *	62	20	.756	2.0	82
3	x – Denver Nuggets	54	28	.659	10.0	82
4	y – Los Angeles Lakers *	53	29	.646	11.0	82
5	x – Houston Rockets	52	30	.634	12.0	82
6	x – Minnesota Timberwolves	49	33	.598	15.0	82
7	x – Phoenix Suns	45	37	.549	19.0	82
8	x – Portland Trail Blazers	42	40	.512	22.0	82
9	pi – Los Angeles Clippers	42	40	.512	22.0	82
10	pi – Golden State Warriors	37	45	.451	27.0	82
11	New Orleans Pelicans	26	56	.317	38.0	82
12	Dallas Mavericks	26	56	.317	38.0	82
13	Memphis Grizzlies	25	57	.305	39.0	82
14	Sacramento Kings	22	60	.268	42.0	82
15	Utah Jazz	22	60	.268	42.0	82

== Game log ==
=== Preseason ===
2025 preseason game log
Total: 4–0 (Home: 2–0; Road: 2–0)
Preseason: 4–0 (home: 2–0; road: 2–0)

Game	Date	Team	Score	High points	High rebounds	High assists	Location Attendance	Record
1	October 6	Atlanta	W 122–113	JD Davison (17)	Eason, Smith Jr. (6)	Alperen Şengün (6)	Toyota Center; 15,995	1–0
2	October 8	Utah	W 140–127	Kevin Durant (20)	Capela, Thompson (7)	Alperen Şengün (13)	Toyota Center; 15,785	2–0
3	October 14	@ New Orleans	W 130–128	Jabari Smith Jr. (26)	Alperen Şengün (12)	Alperen Şengün (7)	Legacy Arena; 12,444	3–0
4	October 16	@ Atlanta	W 133–115	Reed Sheppard (29)	Crawford, Green (8)	Davison, Holiday, Sheppard (6)	State Farm Arena; 15,678	4–0

2025–26 preseason schedule

=== Regular season ===
2025–26 game log
Total: 52–30 (Home: 30–11; Road: 22–19)
October: 2–2 (home: 1–1; road: 1–1)

Game	Date	Team	Score	High points	High rebounds	High assists	Location Attendance	Record
1	October 21	@ Oklahoma City	L 124–125 (2OT)	Alperen Şengün (39)	Steven Adams (13)	Alperen Şengün (7)	Paycom Center; 18,203	0−1
2	October 24	Detroit	L 111–115	Kevin Durant (37)	Steven Adams (10)	Alperen Şengün (7)	Toyota Center; 18,055	0–2
3	October 27	Brooklyn	W 137–109	Tari Eason (22)	Steven Adams (8)	Sheppard, Thompson (8)	Toyota Center; 18,055	1–2
4	October 29	@ Toronto	W 139–121	Kevin Durant (31)	Steven Adams (12)	Alperen Şengün (9)	Scotiabank Arena; 17,234	2–2

November: 11–2 (home: 4–1; road: 7–1)

Game	Date	Team	Score	High points	High rebounds	High assists	Location Attendance	Record
5	November 1	@ Boston	W 128–101	Kevin Durant (26)	Capela, Şengün (10)	Alperen Şengün (9)	TD Garden; 19,156	3–2
6	November 3	Dallas	W 110–102	Amen Thompson (27)	Alperen Şengün (11)	Alperen Şengün (6)	Toyota Center; 18,055	4–2
7	November 5	@ Memphis	W 124–109	Amen Thompson (28)	Alperen Şengün (16)	Şengün, Thompson (7)	FedExForum; 15,119	5–2
8	November 7	@ San Antonio	L 110–121	Alperen Şengün (25)	Alperen Şengün (9)	Alperen Şengün (8)	Frost Bank Center; 19,035	5–3
9	November 9	@ Milwaukee	W 122–115	Kevin Durant (31)	Alperen Şengün (11)	Durant, Şengün (7)	Fiserv Forum; 17,341	6–3
10	November 12	Washington	W 135–112	Kevin Durant (23)	Alperen Şengün (13)	Amen Thompson (8)	Toyota Center; 18,055	7–3
11	November 14	Portland	W 140–116	Kevin Durant (30)	Steven Adams (11)	Alperen Şengün (9)	Toyota Center; 18,055	8–3
12	November 16	Orlando	W 117–113 (OT)	Kevin Durant (35)	Steven Adams (13)	Alperen Şengün (8)	Toyota Center; 18,055	9–3
13	November 19	@ Cleveland	W 114–104	Alperen Şengün (28)	Adams, Şengün (11)	Alperen Şengün (7)	Rocket Arena; 19,432	10–3
14	November 21	Denver	L 109–112	Reed Sheppard (27)	Jabari Smith Jr. (11)	Alperen Şengün (6)	Toyota Center; 18,108	10–4
15	November 24	@ Phoenix	W 114–92	Amen Thompson (28)	Adams, Smith Jr., Thompson (7)	Amen Thompson (8)	Mortgage Matchup Center; 17,071	11–4
16	November 26	@ Golden State	W 104–100	Reed Sheppard (31)	Amen Thompson (14)	Alperen Şengün (6)	Chase Center; 18,064	12–4
17	November 30	@ Utah	W 129–101	Alperen Şengün (27)	Steven Adams (12)	Amen Thompson (9)	Delta Center; 18,186	13–4

December: 7–6 (home: 5–0; road: 2–6)

Game	Date	Team	Score	High points	High rebounds	High assists	Location Attendance	Record
18	December 1	@ Utah	L 133–135	Kevin Durant (32)	Kevin Durant (9)	Alperen Şengün (14)	Delta Center; 18,186	13–5
19	December 3	Sacramento	W 121–95	Alperen Şengün (28)	Amen Thompson (12)	Kevin Durant (8)	Toyota Center; 18,055	14–5
20	December 5	Phoenix	W 117–98	Amen Thompson (31)	Steven Adams (8)	Kevin Durant (8)	Toyota Center; 18,055	15–5
21	December 6	@ Dallas	L 109–122	Kevin Durant (27)	Capela, Smith Jr. (8)	Amen Thompson (6)	American Airlines Center; 19,310	15–6
22	December 11	L.A. Clippers	W 115–113	Alperen Şengün (22)	Alperen Şengün (15)	Amen Thompson (8)	Toyota Center; 18,055	16–6
23	December 15	@ Denver	L 125–128 (OT)	Alperen Şengün (33)	Amen Thompson (12)	Alperen Şengün (10)	Ball Arena; 19,596	16–7
24	December 18	@ New Orleans	L 128–133 (OT)	Kevin Durant (32)	Jabari Smith Jr. (12)	Alperen Şengün (8)	Smoothie King Center; 16,766	16–8
25	December 20	@ Denver	W 115–101	Kevin Durant (31)	Steven Adams (12)	Sheppard, Thompson (6)	Ball Arena; 19,955	17–8
26	December 21	@ Sacramento	L 124–125 (OT)	Alperen Şengün (28)	Kevin Durant (10)	Durant, Thompson (8)	Golden 1 Center; 15,796	17–9
27	December 23	@ L.A. Clippers	L 108–128	Kevin Durant (22)	Alperen Şengün (11)	Alperen Şengün (7)	Intuit Dome; 17,927	17–10
28	December 25	@ L.A. Lakers	W 119–96	Amen Thompson (26)	Alperen Şengün (12)	Kevin Durant (9)	Crypto.com Arena; 18,997	18–10
29	December 27	Cleveland	W 117–100	Kevin Durant (30)	Amen Thompson (9)	Reed Sheppard (8)	Toyota Center; 18,067	19–10
30	December 29	Indiana	W 126–119	Kevin Durant (30)	Jabari Smith Jr. (10)	Amen Thompson (7)	Toyota Center; 18,055	20–10

January: 10–7 (home: 7–2; road: 3–5)

Game	Date	Team	Score	High points	High rebounds	High assists	Location Attendance	Record
31	January 1	@ Brooklyn	W 120–96	Amen Thompson (23)	Tari Eason (9)	Kevin Durant (11)	Barclays Center; 18,003	21–10
32	January 3	@ Dallas	L 104–110	Kevin Durant (34)	Amen Thompson (12)	Kevin Durant (7)	American Airlines Center; 19,703	21–11
33	January 5	Phoenix	W 100–97	Kevin Durant (26)	Steven Adams (11)	Amen Thompson (6)	Toyota Center; 18,055	22–11
34	January 7	@ Portland	L 102–103	Kevin Durant (37)	Tari Eason (13)	Amen Thompson (6)	Moda Center; 16,144	22–12
35	January 9	@ Portland	L 105–111	Kevin Durant (30)	Kevin Durant (12)	Durant, Sheppard (4)	Moda Center; 17,012	22–13
36	January 11	@ Sacramento	L 98–111	Amen Thompson (31)	Amen Thompson (13)	Durant, Thompson (6)	Golden 1 Center; 15,268	22–14
37	January 13	Chicago	W 119–113	Kevin Durant (28)	Kevin Durant (10)	Alperen Şengün (11)	Toyota Center; 18,055	23–14
38	January 15	Oklahoma City	L 91–111	Kevin Durant (19)	Alperen Şengün (13)	Alperen Şengün (5)	Toyota Center; 18,055	23–15
39	January 16	Minnesota	W 110–105	Kevin Durant (39)	Alperen Şengün (14)	Kevin Durant (7)	Toyota Center; 18,055	24–15
40	January 18	New Orleans	W 119–110	Jabari Smith Jr. (32)	Steven Adams (10)	Kevin Durant (8)	Toyota Center; 18,055	25–15
41	January 20	San Antonio	W 111–106	Reed Sheppard (21)	Alperen Şengün (13)	Alperen Şengün (9)	Toyota Center; 18,055	26–15
42	January 22	@ Philadelphia	L 122–128 (OT)	Kevin Durant (36)	Tari Eason (9)	Amen Thompson (9)	Xfinity Mobile Arena; 19,746	26–16
43	January 23	@ Detroit	W 111–104	Kevin Durant (32)	Jabari Smith Jr. (10)	Amen Thompson (7)	Little Caesars Arena; 20,062	27–16
44	January 26	Memphis	W 108–99	Durant, Şengün (33)	Alperen Şengün (9)	Amen Thompson (14)	Toyota Center; 18,055	28–16
45	January 28	San Antonio	L 99–111	Amen Thompson (25)	Alperen Şengün (10)	Alperen Şengün (7)	Toyota Center; 18,055	28–17
46	January 29	@ Atlanta	W 104–86	Kevin Durant (31)	Alperen Şengün (13)	Amen Thompson (5)	State Farm Arena; 16,602	29–17
47	January 31	Dallas	W 111–107	Amen Thompson (21)	Alperen Şengün (14)	Amen Thompson (9)	Toyota Center; 18,055	30–17

February: 7–5 (home: 3–3; road: 4–2)

Game	Date	Team	Score	High points	High rebounds	High assists	Location Attendance	Record
48	February 2	@ Indiana	W 118–114	Alperen Şengün (39)	Alperen Şengün (16)	Amen Thompson (7)	Gainbridge Fieldhouse; 16,511	31–17
49	February 4	Boston	L 93–114	Kevin Durant (15)	Alperen Şengün (9)	Amen Thompson (4)	Toyota Center; 18,055	31–18
50	February 5	Charlotte	L 99–109	Kevin Durant (31)	Alperen Şengün (9)	Amen Thompson (7)	Toyota Center; 18,055	31–19
51	February 7	@ Oklahoma City	W 112–106	Tari Eason (26)	Alperen Şengün (12)	Alperen Şengün (11)	Paycom Center; 18,203	32–19
52	February 10	L.A. Clippers	W 102–95	Kevin Durant (26)	Jabari Smith Jr. (10)	Alperen Şengün (5)	Toyota Center; 18,055	33–19
53	February 11	L.A. Clippers	L 102–105	Kevin Durant (21)	Jabari Smith Jr. (12)	Durant, Şengün (6)	Toyota Center; 18,055	33–20
All-Star Game
54	February 19	@ Charlotte	W 105–101	Kevin Durant (35)	Kevin Durant (8)	Alperen Şengün (7)	Spectrum Center; 19,622	34–20
55	February 21	@ New York	L 106–108	Kevin Durant (30)	Tari Eason (12)	Amen Thompson (7)	Madison Square Garden; 19,812	34–21
56	February 23	Utah	W 125–105	Jabari Smith Jr. (31)	Tari Eason (10)	Kevin Durant (12)	Toyota Center; 18,055	35–21
57	February 25	Sacramento	W 128–97	Reed Sheppard (28)	Alperen Şengün (13)	Alperen Şengün (11)	Toyota Center; 18,055	36–21
58	February 26	@ Orlando	W 113–108	Kevin Durant (40)	Durant, Eason (8)	Alperen Şengün (5)	Kia Center; 17,524	37–21
59	February 28	@ Miami	L 105–115	Kevin Durant (32)	Eason, Thompson (11)	Kevin Durant (8)	Kaseya Center; 19,700	37–22

March: 9–7 (home: 6–3; road: 3–4)

Game	Date	Team	Score	High points	High rebounds	High assists	Location Attendance	Record
60	March 2	@ Washington	W 123–118	Alperen Şengün (32)	Alperen Şengün (13)	Reed Sheppard (10)	Capital One Arena; 17,352	38–22
61	March 5	Golden State	L 113–115 (OT)	Reed Sheppard (30)	Jabari Smith Jr. (11)	Alperen Şengün (7)	Toyota Center; 18,055	38–23
62	March 6	Portland	W 106–99	Alperen Şengün (28)	Kevin Durant (8)	Amen Thompson (7)	Toyota Center; 18,055	39–23
63	March 8	@ San Antonio	L 120–145	Durant, Thompson (23)	Amen Thompson (7)	Amen Thompson (6)	Frost Bank Center; 19,003	39–24
64	March 10	Toronto	W 113–99	Kevin Durant (29)	Alperen Şengün (12)	Amen Thompson (6)	Toyota Center; 18,055	40–24
65	March 11	@ Denver	L 93–129	Amen Thompson (16)	Tari Eason (8)	Kevin Durant (5)	Ball Arena; 19,602	40–25
66	March 13	New Orleans	W 107–105	Kevin Durant (32)	Amen Thompson (12)	Amen Thompson (8)	Toyota Center; 18,055	41–25
67	March 16	L.A. Lakers	L 92–100	Jabari Smith Jr. (22)	Amen Thompson (12)	Amen Thompson (5)	Toyota Center; 18,055	41–26
68	March 18	L.A. Lakers	L 116–124	Alperen Şengün (27)	Amen Thompson (11)	Alperen Şengün (10)	Toyota Center; 18,055	41–27
69	March 20	Atlanta	W 117–95	Kevin Durant (25)	Tari Eason (10)	Alperen Şengün (10)	Toyota Center; 18,055	42–27
70	March 21	Miami	W 123–122	Kevin Durant (27)	Amen Thompson (18)	Reed Sheppard (14)	Toyota Center; 18,055	43–27
71	March 23	@ Chicago	L 124–132	Kevin Durant (40)	Alperen Şengün (13)	Alperen Şengün (10)	United Center; 21,395	43–28
72	March 25	@ Minnesota	L 108–110 (OT)	Durant, Şengün (30)	Jabari Smith Jr. (12)	Amen Thompson (10)	Target Center; 18,978	43–29
73	March 27	@ Memphis	W 119–109	Kevin Durant (25)	Jabari Smith Jr. (16)	Kevin Durant (10)	FedExForum; 15,715	44–29
74	March 29	@ New Orleans	W 134–102	Alperen Şengün (36)	Capela, Şengün (14)	Alperen Şengün (7)	Smoothie King Center; 16,758	45–29
75	March 31	New York	W 111–94	Kevin Durant (27)	Tari Eason (8)	Alperen Şengün (10)	Toyota Center; 18,055	46–29

April: 6–1 (home: 4–1; road: 2–0)

Game	Date	Team	Score	High points	High rebounds	High assists	Location Attendance	Record
76	April 1	Milwaukee	W 119–113	Reed Sheppard (27)	Alperen Şengün (9)	Kevin Durant (9)	Toyota Center; 18,055	47–29
77	April 3	Utah	W 140–106	Kevin Durant (25)	Amen Thompson (8)	Reed Sheppard (7)	Toyota Center; 18,055	48–29
78	April 5	@ Golden State	W 117–116	Kevin Durant (31)	Jabari Smith Jr. (9)	Kevin Durant (8)	Chase Center; 18,064	49–29
79	April 7	@ Phoenix	W 119–105	Kevin Durant (24)	Alperen Şengün (14)	Amen Thompson (8)	Mortgage Matchup Center; 17,071	50–29
80	April 9	Philadelphia	W 113–102	Kevin Durant (29)	Alperen Şengün (12)	Kevin Durant (5)	Toyota Center; 18,055	51–29
81	April 10	Minnesota	L 132–136	Amen Thompson (41)	Amen Thompson (9)	Alperen Şengün (8)	Toyota Center; 18,113	51–30
82	April 12	Memphis	W 132–101	Clint Capela (23)	Clint Capela (13)	JD Davison (7)	Toyota Center; 18,055	52–30

2025–26 season schedule

=== Playoffs ===
2026 playoff game log
Total: 2–4 (home: 1–2; road: 1–2)
First Round: 2–4 (home: 1–2; road: 1–2)

Game	Date	Team	Score	High points	High rebounds	High assists	Location Attendance	Series
1	April 18	@ L.A. Lakers	L 98–107	Alperen Şengün (19)	Jabari Smith Jr. (12)	Reed Sheppard (8)	Crypto.com Arena; 19,057	0–1
2	April 21	@ L.A. Lakers	L 94–101	Kevin Durant (23)	Alperen Şengün (11)	Amen Thompson (9)	Crypto.com Arena; 19,057	0–2
3	April 24	L.A. Lakers	L 108–112 (OT)	Alperen Şengün (33)	Alperen Şengün (16)	Reed Sheppard (7)	Toyota Center; 18,055	0–3
4	April 26	L.A. Lakers	W 115–96	Amen Thompson (23)	Eason, Smith Jr. (8)	Amen Thompson (7)	Toyota Center; 18,055	1–3
5	April 29	@ L.A. Lakers	W 99–93	Jabari Smith Jr. (22)	Alperen Şengün (9)	Alperen Şengün (8)	Crypto.com Arena; 19,057	2–3
6	May 1	L.A. Lakers	L 78–98	Amen Thompson (18)	Jabari Smith Jr. (12)	Thompson, Smith Jr. (3)	Toyota Center; 18,055	2–4

2026 playoff schedule

=== NBA Cup ===
==== West Group C ====
Pos	Team	Pld	W	L	PF	PA	PD	Qualification
1	San Antonio Spurs	4	3	1	483	457	+26	Advanced to knockout rounds
2	Denver Nuggets	4	2	2	484	461	+23	
3	Houston Rockets	4	2	2	463	449	+14	
4	Portland Trail Blazers	4	2	2	454	485	−31	
5	Golden State Warriors	4	1	3	436	468	−32	

Source: NBA

== Player statistics ==
Legend
GP	Games played	GS	Games started	MPG	Minutes per game
FG%	Field-goal percentage	3P%	3-point field-goal percentage	FT%	Free-throw percentage
RPG	Rebounds per game	APG	Assists per game	SPG	Steals per game
BPG	Blocks per game	PPG	Points per game

=== Regular season ===
Houston Rockets statistics
Player	GP	GS	MPG	FG%	3P%	FT%	RPG	APG	SPG	BPG	PPG
Steven Adams	32	11	22.8	.504		.580	8.6	1.5	.7	.6	5.8
Clint Capela	75	3	12.3	.520	.500	.577	4.6	.7	.5	.8	3.8
Isaiah Crawford	14	0	6.6	.417	.231	.833	1.1	.4	.1	.2	2.0
JD Davison	28	0	7.8	.375	.250	.684	1.2	1.3	.2	.2	2.5
Kevin Durant	78	78	36.4	.520	.413	.874	5.5	4.8	.8	.9	26.0
Tari Eason	60	34	25.8	.416	.358	.776	6.3	1.5	1.2	.5	10.5
Dorian Finney-Smith	37	1	16.8	.333	.270	.889	2.5	1.0	.4	.2	3.3
Jeff Green	30	0	5.8	.368	.273	1.000	.8	.3	.1	.1	2.2
Aaron Holiday	57	1	13.7	.417	.394	.854	1.0	1.1	.5	.1	5.5
Tristen Newton	1	0	12.0	.444	.400	.667	3.0	.0	1.0	.0	12.0
Josh Okogie	78	32	17.4	.425	.385	.594	2.6	.9	.8	.2	4.5
Alperen Şengün	72	72	33.3	.519	.305	.691	8.9	6.2	1.2	1.1	20.4
Reed Sheppard	82	21	26.2	.430	.394	.802	2.9	3.4	1.5	.7	13.5
Jabari Smith Jr.	77	77	35.1	.450	.363	.775	6.9	1.9	.7	.9	15.8
Jae'Sean Tate	46	1	8.8	.514	.313	.636	1.6	.5	.2	.1	2.8
Amen Thompson	79	79	37.4	.534	.216	.779	7.8	5.3	1.5	.6	18.3

=== Playoffs ===
Houston Rockets statistics
Player	GP	GS	MPG	FG%	3P%	FT%	RPG	APG	SPG	BPG	PPG
Clint Capela	4	0	5.5	.375			1.8	.3	.0	.3	1.5
JD Davison	2	0	2.5			1.000	1.0	.0	.0	.0	1.0
Kevin Durant	1	1	41.0	.583	.250	.889	6.0	4.0	1.0	1.0	23.0
Tari Eason	6	4	32.5	.477	.333	.846	6.7	1.7	2.5	.7	13.8
Dorian Finney-Smith	4	0	12.3	.143	.182	1.000	2.0	.3	.3	.3	2.0
Jeff Green	2	0	5.5	.000	.000		.0	.0	.0	.0	.0
Aaron Holiday	6	0	11.2	.273	.267		.3	.5	.3	.2	2.7
Josh Okogie	6	2	17.3	.440	.385	1.000	2.3	.8	1.2	.0	4.8
Alperen Şengün	6	6	38.7	.465	.125	.690	10.2	4.7	1.8	1.3	20.3
Reed Sheppard	6	5	32.0	.307	.296	.750	1.0	4.7	2.2	.8	12.2
Jabari Smith Jr.	6	6	42.0	.388	.373	.769	8.5	1.8	1.0	.7	17.5
Jae'Sean Tate	5	0	6.0	.300	.000	.667	2.0	.0	.2	.0	2.0
Amen Thompson	6	6	44.0	.488	.250	.707	7.0	5.7	2.0	1.2	19.2

- ^{†} Denotes player spent time with another team in the season. Stats reflect time with the Rockets only.

== Transactions ==
=== Trades ===
Date	Trade		Ref.
July 6, 2025	Three-team trade		
July 6, 2025	To Washington Wizards: CJ McCollum; Kelly Olynyk; Cam Whitmore; 2027 second-round pick (from Chicago) (Note: This pick was previously split, with Washington receiving it if No. 31–50 and New Orleans receiving it if No. 51–60; Washington will now receive the pick regardless of its position.)	To Houston Rockets: 2026 second-round pick (from Chicago); 2029 second-round pick (from Sacramento); Draft rights to Mojave King (2023 No. 47)	
July 6, 2025	To New Orleans Pelicans: Saddiq Bey; Jordan Poole; Draft rights to Micah Peavy (No. 40)		
July 6, 2025	Seven-team trade		
July 6, 2025	To Atlanta Hawks: David Roddy (two-way contract); 2031 second-round pick swap (Note: Atlanta may swap their own pick for Houston's pick.); Cash considerations	To Los Angeles Lakers: Draft rights to Adou Thiero (No. 36)	
July 6, 2025	To Brooklyn Nets: 2026 second-round pick (Note: The second-most favorable of the picks originally belonging to Boston, Indiana, LA Clippers, and Miami.); 2030 second-round pick (from Boston)	To Houston Rockets: Kevin Durant; Clint Capela (sign-and-trade)	
July 6, 2025	To Phoenix Suns: Jalen Green; Dillon Brooks; Daeqwon Plowden (two-way contract); Draft rights to Khaman Maluach (No. 10); Draft rights to Rasheer Fleming (No. 31); Draft rights to Koby Brea (No. 41); 2026 second-round pick (Note: The second-most favorable of the picks originally belonging to Dallas, Oklahoma City, and Philadelphia.); 2032 second-round pick (Note: Least favorable between Houston and Minnesota.)	To Minnesota Timberwolves: Draft rights to Rocco Zikarsky (No. 45); 2026 second-round pick (Note: The less favorable of the picks originally belonging to Denver and Golden State.); 2032 second-round pick (Note: The less favorable of the picks originally belonging to Houston and Phoenix.); Cash considerations	
July 6, 2025	To Golden State Warriors: Draft rights to Alex Toohey (No. 52); Draft rights to Jahmai Mashack (No. 59)		

=== Free agency ===
==== Re-signed ====
Date	Player	Ref.
June 18, 2025	Steven Adams	
July 10, 2025	Jeff Green	
July 10, 2025	Aaron Holiday	
July 10, 2025	Jae'Sean Tate	
July 10, 2025	Fred VanVleet	

==== Additions ====
Date	Player	Former Team	Ref.
July 7, 2025	Dorian Finney-Smith	Los Angeles Lakers	
July 22, 2025	Josh Okogie	Charlotte Hornets	

==== Subtractions ====
Player	Reason	New Team	Ref.
Jack McVeigh	Waived	(Australia) Cairns Taipans	
Jock Landale	Waived	Memphis Grizzlies	
Cam Whitmore	Traded	Washington Wizards	
Nate Williams	Waived	Long Island Nets	
