= Frankie Ferrari =

American basketball player (born 1995)

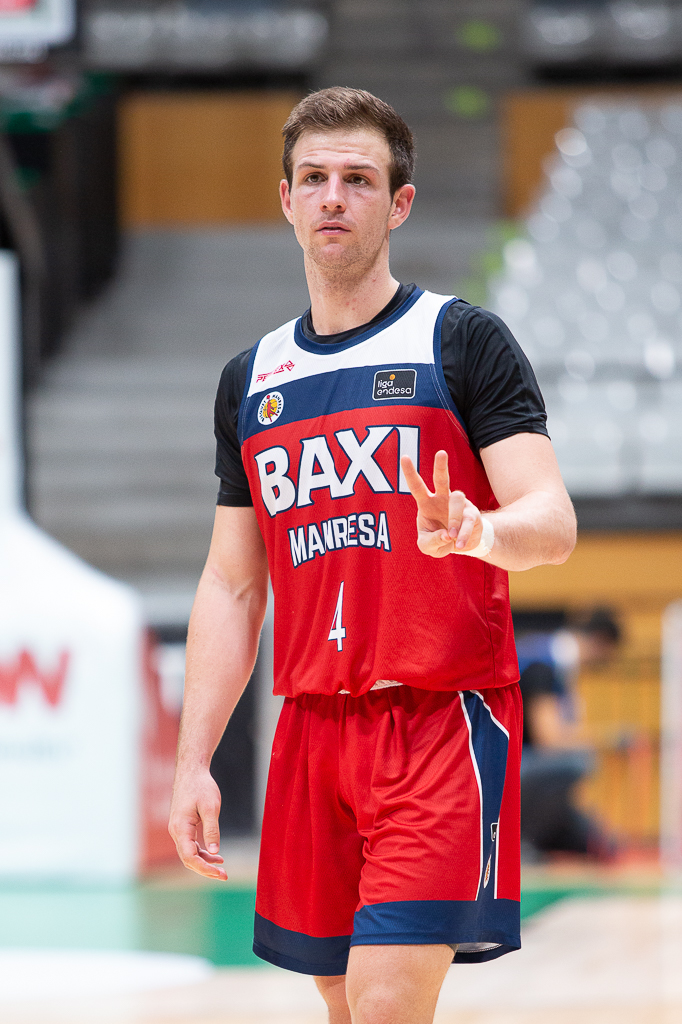
- Ferrari in 2019

San Francisco Dons
- Title: Assistant Coach/Director of Player Development
- League: West Coast Conference

Personal information
- Born: December 20, 1995 (age 30) Burlingame, California, U.S.
- Listed height: 6 ft 1 in (1.85 m)
- Listed weight: 190 lb (86 kg)

Career information
- High school: Burlingame (Burlingame, California); Archbishop Riordan (San Francisco, California)
- College: San Francisco (2014–2019)
- NBA draft: 2019: undrafted
- Playing career: 2019–2023
- Position: Point guard

Career history

Playing
- 2019–2020: Baxi Manresa
- 2020: Gran Canaria
- 2020–2021: Unicaja
- 2021: Baxi Manresa
- 2021: Brose Bamberg
- 2022: Santa Cruz Warriors
- 2022: Zaragoza
- 2022–2023: Baxi Manresa
- 2023: Śląsk Wrocław

Coaching
- 2023–present: San Francisco (assistant)

Career highlights
- 2× First-team All-WCC (2018, 2019)

Frankie Ferrari (born December 20, 1995) is an American coach for the San Francisco Dons and former player. He played college basketball for San Francisco and professionally in Europe and the NBA G League.

== Early life and high school ==
Ferrari was born and grew up in Burlingame, California. He initially attended Burlingame High School, where he was called up to the varsity team as a freshman for the postseason and started as a sophomore but transferred to Archbishop Riordan High School in San Francisco before his junior year. After sitting out the first ten games of the season due to transfer rules, Ferrari was moved to shooting guard and finished second on the team with 10.8 points per game. He transferred back to Burlingame after his junior year to be closer to home following his parents divorce. As a senior, Ferrari averaged 22.4 points, 7.1 assists, 5.7 rebounds and 3.2 steals per game and was named the Peninsula Athletic League Player of the Year and the area player of the year by The Mercury News. Ferrari committed to play college basketball for the University of San Francisco Dons, one of two NCAA Division I programs to offer him a scholarship along with Idaho State.

== College career ==
Ferrari played sparingly as a freshman, appearing in 16 games and averaging 8.9 minutes played and 1.3 points per game. He left the team after the end of the season and transferred to Cañada College, where he redshirted his sophomore year. Ferrari returned to San Francisco after being heavily recruited by new Dons head coach Kyle Smith. In his first season back with the team Ferrari saw a significant increase in playing time as a key reserve despite missing the first eight games of the season due to a broken hand, appearing in 25 games (starting four) and averaging 5.2 points, 2.3 rebounds and 1.9 assists per game. He became the Dons' starting point guard during his redshirt junior season, playing a school record 39 games (27 starts) and led the team with 11.4 points, 4.6 assists (5th-best in the conference) and 1.0 steals per game and was named first team All-West Coast Conference (WCC). He also became the first USF player since 2014 to be named the WCC player of the week after scoring 20 points with seven assists in the team's upset win against St. Mary's. As a redshirt senior, Ferrari again led the team in points (14.7) and assists (5.5–3rd in the WCC) and steals (1.6), and was named first team All-WCC for a second straight year. Ferrari finished his collegiate career 30th in school history with 1,053 points, fifth in three-point field goals with 172, and third with 410 assists.

== Professional career ==
=== Manresa ===
Ferrari was named to the Utah Jazz's NBA Summer League roster after going unselected in the 2019 NBA draft. Ferrari signed with Baxi Manresa of the Liga ACB on July 24, 2019. In his first game in late September, 2019 Ferrari scored 25 points and passed for 10 assists, but broke his left (non-shooting) wrist and missed the next five weeks of the season. Ferrari broke his foot in November 2019 and left the team in early February 2020 to recuperate in the United States. In his first professional season, Ferrari averaged 14.7 points and 5.7 assists in six Spanish League games and 11 points and 7.7 assists in three Basketball Champions League games.

In the summer of 2022, Ferrari played with the Sacramento Kings in the Las Vegas NBA Summer League, and logged 16 points versus the Indiana Pacers on July 10, 2022, in a 103-96 Sacramento victory. He was the game leader in the plus/minus category at plus 27.

=== Gran Canaria ===
Ferrari signed with CB Gran Canaria of the Liga ACB on July 23, 2020.

=== Unicaja Malaga ===
On December 12, 2020, he signed with Unicaja of the Liga ACB.

=== Second stint with Manresa ===
On February 15, 2021, he signed with Baxi Manresa and return to his old club. He averaged 11.8 points, 5.3 assists, 1.5 rebounds and 1.2 steals per game.

=== Brose Bamberg ===
On September 6, 2021, Ferrari signed with Brose Bamberg of the Basketball Bundesliga. He played three games and averaged six points and five assists per game. On October 9, Ferrari announced his retirement from professional basketball for health reasons.

=== Santa Cruz Warriors ===
On January 8, 2022, Ferrari came out of retirement and was acquired via waivers by the Santa Cruz Warriors.

=== Basket Zaragoza ===
At the conclusion of the G League season On April 6, 2022, Ferrari signed with Basket Zaragoza of the Spanish Liga ACB.

=== Third stint with Manresa ===
On November 12, 2022, he signed with Baxi Manresa of the Liga ACB.

=== Śląsk Wrocław ===
On October 15, 2023, he signed with Śląsk Wrocław of the PLK. On October 24, Ferrari announced his second retirement from professional basketball.

== Coaching career ==
After announcing his retirement Ferrari was hired by USF as an assistant basketball coach and the Dons' director of player development.

== Personal ==
Ferrari's father, Paul, coached Burlingame High School's junior varsity basketball team while Frankie was a freshman. His older brother Ralph is on the coaching staff at the University of San Francisco. Vinny, one of his two younger brothers, played basketball at Cañada College and briefly at the University of San Diego. He is now playing at University of Redlands, a Division III school in Southern California. Ferrari's father had over amateur 100 boxing matches.
