= RJ Nembhard =

American basketball player (born 1999)

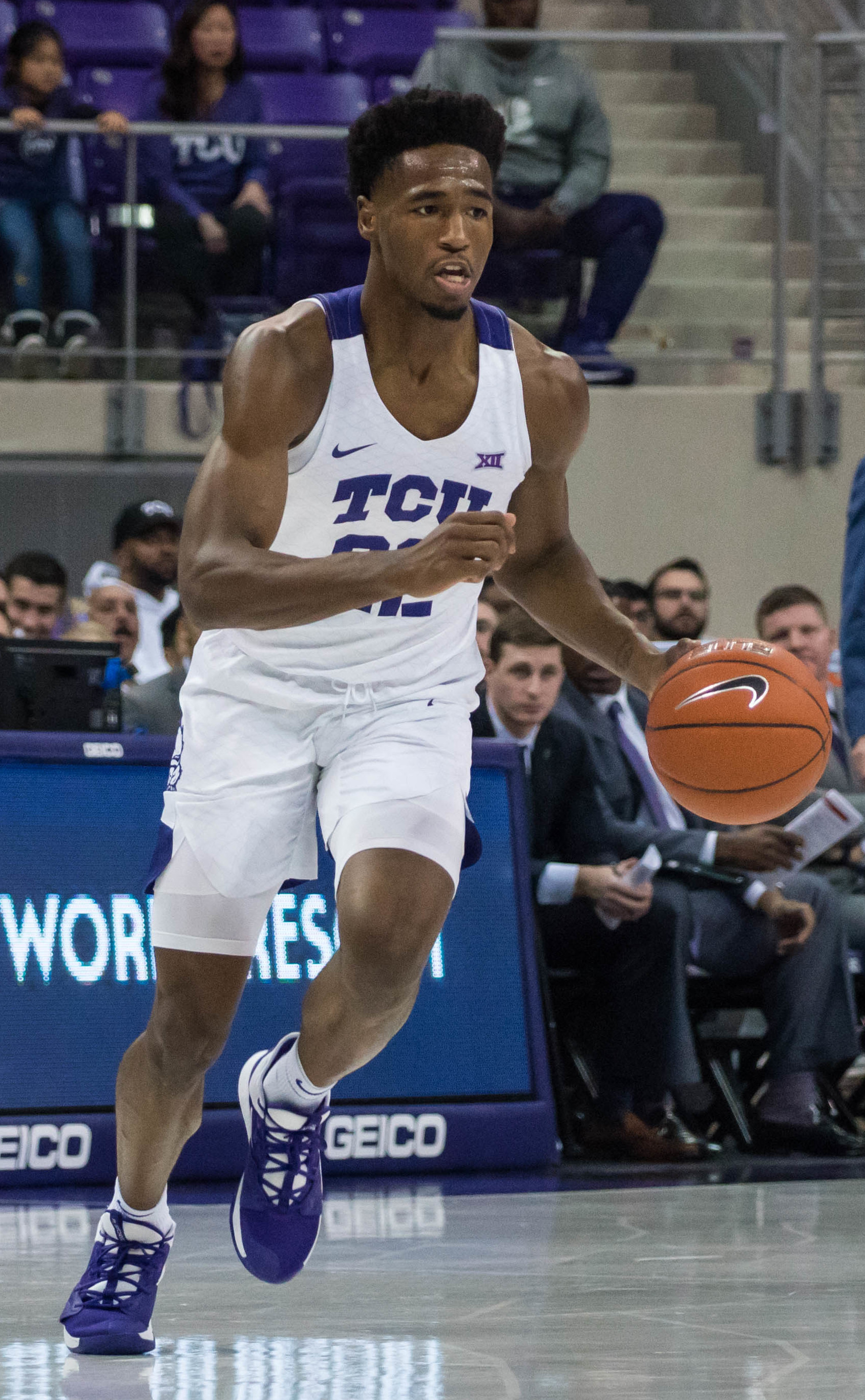
- Nembhard with TCU in 2019

No. 2 – Gravelines-Dunkerque
- Position: Point guard / shooting guard
- League: LNB Élite

Personal information
- Born: March 22, 1999 (age 27) Keller, Texas, U.S.
- Listed height: 6 ft 4 in (1.93 m)
- Listed weight: 200 lb (91 kg)

Career information
- High school: Keller (Keller, Texas)
- College: TCU (2017–2021)
- NBA draft: 2021: undrafted
- Playing career: 2021–present

Career history
- 2021–2022: Cleveland Cavaliers
- 2021–2022: →Cleveland Charge
- 2022: Motor City Cruise
- 2022–2023: Reggio Emilia
- 2023: Fos Provence
- 2023: Filou Oostende
- 2024–2025: Capital City Go-Go
- 2025: Zhejiang Golden Bulls
- 2025–2026: Windy City Bulls
- 2026: Valley Suns
- 2026–present: Gravelines-Dunkerque

Career highlights
- Third-team All-Big 12 (2021)
- Stats at NBA.com
- Stats at Basketball Reference

Ruben R. "RJ" Nembhard Jr. (born March 22, 1999) is an American professional basketball player for Gravelines-Dunkerque of the LNB Élite. He played college basketball for the TCU Horned Frogs.

== Early life ==
Nembhard grew up playing football and started playing basketball at age 10. He attended Keller High School in Keller, Texas. Nembhard averaged 21 points as a junior, earning District 5-6A MVP honors. In his senior season, he averaged 25.7 points, 6.5 rebounds and 3.2 assists per game. Nembhard was named Star-Telegram Super Team Player of the Year and District 3-6A MVP. A four-star recruit, he committed to playing college basketball for TCU over offers from Texas, Oklahoma, Kansas State and Baylor.

== College career ==
Nembhard redshirted his first season at TCU after receiving limited playing time through six games and suffering a knee injury. As a freshman, he came off the bench, averaging 4.4 points and 2.1 rebounds per game. On January 4, 2020, he scored a career-high 31 points in an 81–79 overtime win over Iowa State. As a sophomore, Nembhard averaged 12.1 points, 3.8 rebounds and 3.5 assists per game. As a junior, he averaged 15.7 points, 4.3 rebounds and four assists per game, earning Third Team All-Big 12 honors. On March 29, 2021, Nembhard declared for the 2021 NBA draft while maintaining his college eligibility. He later decided to remain in the draft.

== Professional career ==
=== Cleveland Cavaliers (2021–2022) ===
After going undrafted in the 2021 NBA draft, Nembhard joined the Miami Heat for the 2021 NBA Summer League. On September 27, 2021, he signed with the Cleveland Cavaliers. On October 16, his deal was converted to a two-way contract with the Cleveland Charge of the NBA G League. On March 31, 2022, he signed a standard contract with the Cavaliers. On April 7, he was waived by the Cavaliers and three days later, he signed another two-way contract with the Cleveland Cavaliers. On July 3, 2022, Nembhard signed a third two-way contract with the Cavaliers, but was waived on October 15.

=== Motor City Cruise (2022) ===
On November 9, 2022, the Motor City Cruise announced via their Twitter account that they had acquired Nembhard.

=== UNAHOTELS Reggio Emilia (2022–2023) ===
On December 12, 2022, Nembhard signed with UNAHOTELS Reggio Emilia of the Lega Basket Serie A.

=== Fos Provence Basket (2023) ===
On January 19, 2023, Nembhard signed with Fos Provence Basket of the LNB Pro A.

Nembhard joined the Toronto Raptors for the 2023 NBA Summer League.

=== Filou Oostende (2023) ===
On September 9, 2023, Nembhard signed with Filou Oostende of the BNXT League, but was released on November 19.

=== Capital City Go-Go (2024–2025) ===
On March 22, 2024, Nembhard joined the Capital City Go-Go.

=== Zhejiang Golden Bulls (2025) ===
On March 3, 2025, Nembhard signed with the Zhejiang Golden Bulls of the Chinese Basketball Association (CBA) for the rest of the 2024–25 season.

=== Windy City Bulls (2025–2026) ===
On September 29, 2025, Nembhard's returning player rights alongside the returning player rights to Mouhamadou Gueye were traded from the Capital City Go-Go to the Windy City Bulls in exchange for two 2025 first-round picks.

=== Valley Suns (2026) ===
On January 23, 2026, Nembhard was traded to the Valley Suns in a three team trade involving the Long Island Nets.

Nembhard joined both the Golden State Warriors and the Washington Wizards for the 2026 NBA Summer League.

=== BCM Gravelines-Dunkerque (2026–present) ===
On October 1, 2026, Nembhard signed with BCM Gravelines-Dunkerque of the French LNB Élite.

== Career statistics ==
Legend
GP	Games played	GS	Games started	MPG	Minutes per game
FG%	Field goal percentage	3P%	3-point field goal percentage	FT%	Free throw percentage
RPG	Rebounds per game	APG	Assists per game	SPG	Steals per game
BPG	Blocks per game	PPG	Points per game	**Bold**	Career high

=== NBA ===
Year	Team	GP	GS	MPG	FG%	3P%	FT%	RPG	APG	SPG	BPG	PPG
2021–22	Cleveland	14	0	4.5	.333	.000	.750	.5	.9	.1	.0	1.1
Career		14	0	4.5	.333	.000	.750	.5	.9	.1	.0	1.1

=== College ===
Year	Team	GP	GS	MPG	FG%	3P%	FT%	RPG	APG	SPG	BPG	PPG
2017–18	TCU	6	0	5.5	.286	.000	.250	1.0	.8	.0	.2	1.5
2018–19	TCU	**36**	8	17.2	.351	.299	.615	2.1	.9	.5	**.4**	4.4
2019–20	TCU	29	**28**	32.1	.366	.313	.740	3.8	3.5	1.0	.2	12.1
2020–21	TCU	24	24	**34.9**	**.400**	**.339**	**.778**	**4.3**	**4.0**	**1.1**	.2	**15.7**
Career		95	60	25.5	.375	.314	.724	3.1	2.5	.8	.3	9.4

== Personal life ==
Son of Ruben & Terri Nembhard. Nembhard's father, Ruben, played one season in the NBA/15 seasons overseas and works as a trainer and skills development coach. His grandfather, Joe Beauchamp played ten seasons as a defensive back with the San Diego Chargers and his sister, Jayden, plays volleyball for Long Beach State.

== See also ==
- List of second-generation NBA players
