= JD Davison =

American basketball player (born 2002)

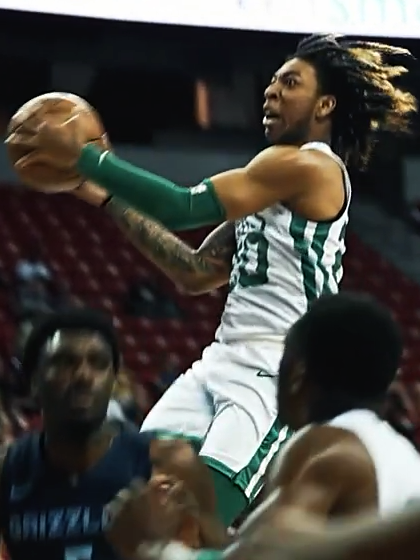
- Davison with the Boston Celtics in 2022

No. 4 – Osceola Magic
- Position: Point guard
- League: NBA G League

Personal information
- Born: October 3, 2002 (age 24) Montgomery, Alabama, U.S.
- Listed height: 6 ft 1 in (1.85 m)
- Listed weight: 195 lb (88 kg)

Career information
- High school: Calhoun (Letohatchee, Alabama)
- College: Alabama (2021–2022)
- NBA draft: 2022: 2nd round, 53rd overall pick
- Drafted by: Boston Celtics
- Playing career: 2022–present

Career history
- 2022–2025: Boston Celtics
- 2022–2025: →Maine Celtics
- 2025–2026: Houston Rockets
- 2025–2026: →Rio Grande Valley Vipers
- 2026–present: Osceola Magic

Career highlights
- NBA champion (2024); NBA G League Most Valuable Player (2025); All-NBA G League First Team (2025); All-NBA G League Third Team (2024); NBA G League Next Up Game (2024); SEC All-Freshman Team (2022); McDonald's All-American (2021); 2× Alabama Mr. Basketball (2020, 2021)
- Stats at NBA.com
- Stats at Basketball Reference

Jerdarrian Devontae "JD" Davison (born October 3, 2002) is an American professional basketball player for the Osceola Magic of the NBA G League. He played college basketball for the Alabama Crimson Tide. Davison was a consensus five-star recruit and one of the top point guards in the 2021 class. He was named the NBA G League Most Valuable Player for the 2024–25 season.

== High school career ==
Davison attended Calhoun High School in Letohatchee, Alabama. As a junior, Davison averaged 30.4 points, 12 rebounds and five assists per game, earning Alabama Mr. Basketball and Alabama Gatorade Player of the Year honors. He led his team to a Class 2A state title, converting a game-winning three-pointer as part of a 34-point, 10-rebound performance in the title game. As a senior, Davison averaged 32.4 points, 10.9 rebounds and 4.7 assists per game. He was selected as Alabama Mr. Basketball for a second consecutive season. Davison was named to the McDonald's All-American Game and Jordan Brand Classic rosters.

=== Recruiting ===
Davison was a consensus five-star recruit and one of the top point guards in the 2021 class. On October 3, 2020, he committed to playing college basketball for Alabama over offers from Auburn, LSU, Memphis, Michigan, and Kansas. He became the first five-star recruit during the tenure of head coach Nate Oats. He was drawn to Alabama in part because he wanted to remain close to home.

College recruiting
Name	Hometown	School	Height	Weight	Commit date
JD Davison; PG	Letohatchee, AL	Calhoun (AL)	6 ft 3 in (1.91 m)	180 lb (82 kg)	Oct 3, 2020
JD Davison; PG	Recruit ratings: Rivals: 247Sports: ESPN: (94)				
Overall recruit ranking: Rivals: 13 247Sports: 16 ESPN: 15
Note: In many cases, Scout, Rivals, 247Sports, On3, and ESPN may conflict in their listings of height and weight.; In these cases, the average was taken. ESPN grades are on a 100-point scale.; Sources: "Alabama 2021 Basketball Commitments". Rivals.; "2021 Alabama Crimson Tide Recruiting Class". ESPN.; "2021 Team Ranking". Rivals.

== College career ==
As a freshman, Davison averaged 8.5 points, 4.8 rebounds, and 4.3 assists per game. He was named to the SEC All-Freshman Team. On April 13, 2022, Davison declared for the 2022 NBA draft, forgoing his remaining college eligibility.

== Professional career ==
=== Boston Celtics (2022–2025) ===
Davison was selected with the 53rd overall pick by the Boston Celtics. On July 8, 2022, the Celtics signed him to a two-way contract. Under the terms of the deal he would split time between the Celtics and their NBA G League affiliate, the Maine Celtics. Davison made his NBA debut on November 11, 2022, in a 131–112 win over the Denver Nuggets.

On July 9, 2023, Davison signed another two-way contract with the Celtics. Davison became an NBA champion when the Celtics defeated the Dallas Mavericks in 5 games in the NBA Finals. On July 8, 2024, he signed another two-way contract.

On April 2, 2025, Davison was named the NBA G League MVP for the 2024–25 season. He appeared in 30 games for Maine, posting averages of 25.1 points, 5.2 rebounds, and 7.5 assists per game. On April 12, Davison was converted to a standard, two-year contract with the Celtics. He made 16 total appearances for the Celtics during the 2024–25 NBA season, averaging 2.1 points, 0.8 rebounds, and 0.9 assists. On July 24, Davison was waived by Celtics.

=== Houston Rockets / Rio Grande Valley Vipers (2025–2026) ===
On July 27, 2025, Davison signed a two-way contract with the Houston Rockets. On April 7, 2026, Davison agreed to a two-year, standard contract with the Rockets.

=== Orlando Magic (2026) ===
On September 3, 2026, Davison signed an Exhibit 10 contract with the Orlando Magic.

== Career statistics ==
Legend
GP	Games played	GS	Games started	MPG	Minutes per game
FG%	Field goal percentage	3P%	3-point field goal percentage	FT%	Free throw percentage
RPG	Rebounds per game	APG	Assists per game	SPG	Steals per game
BPG	Blocks per game	PPG	Points per game	**Bold**	Career high
†	Won an NBA championship

=== NBA ===
==== Regular season ====
Year	Team	GP	GS	MPG	FG%	3P%	FT%	RPG	APG	SPG	BPG	PPG
2022–23	Boston	12	0	5.5	**.421**	.286	.500	.8	.9	**.2**	**.2**	1.6
2023–24†	Boston	8	0	4.9	.417	**.429**	**.750**	**1.3**	**1.3**	.1	.1	2.0
2024–25	Boston	16	0	5.8	.353	.222	.714	.8	.8	**.3**	.1	2.1
2025–26	Houston	**28**	0	**7.8**	.375	.250	.684	1.2	**1.3**	.2	**.2**	**2.5**
Career		64	0	6.5	.380	.266	.688	1.0	1.1	.2	.2	2.1

==== Playoffs ====
Year	Team	GP	GS	MPG	FG%	3P%	FT%	RPG	APG	SPG	BPG	PPG
2025	Boston	**4**	0	**3.3**	**.125**	**.500**	.500	.8	**.8**	.0	.0	**1.0**
2026	Houston	2	0	2.5	—	—	**1.000**	**1.0**	.0	.0	.0	**1.0**
Career		6	0	3.0	.125	.500	.750	.8	.5	.0	.0	1.0

=== College ===
Year	Team	GP	GS	MPG	FG%	3P%	FT%	RPG	APG	SPG	BPG	PPG
2021–22	Alabama	33	5	25.8	.463	.301	.728	4.8	4.3	1.0	.4	8.5
