= 2025–26 San Antonio Spurs season =

- Conference champions
- Division champions
- Head coach: Mitch Johnson
- President: Gregg Popovich
- General manager: Brian Wright
- Owner: Peter Holt
- Arena: Frost Bank Center

Results
- Record: 62–20 (.756)
- Place: Division: 1st (Southwest); Conference: 2nd (Western)
- Playoff finish: NBA Finals (lost to Knicks 1–4)
- Stats at Basketball Reference

Local media
- Television: FanDuel Sports Network Southwest; Tegna Inc. (Note: Affiliates include: KENS (San Antonio); KVUE (Austin); KIII (Corpus Christi)) (8 games)
- Radio: 1200 WOAI

The 2025–26 San Antonio Spurs season was the 59th season of the franchise, its 50th in the National Basketball Association (NBA), and its 53rd in the San Antonio area.

On May 2, 2025, Gregg Popovich stepped down as Spurs head coach after 29 seasons with the team. This season marks the first time since the 1995–96 season that the franchise did not have Popovich involved in a coaching role. Assistant coach Mitch Johnson, who had served as acting head coach for much of the previous season, was officially named the team's head coach.

The Spurs opened the regular season with their best start in franchise history, going 5–0. They also finished the 2025 NBA Cup as the tournament runner-up and winner of West Group C, after concluding the group stage with a 3–1 record. In the knockout stage, the Spurs eliminated the Los Angeles Lakers in the quarterfinals before upsetting the defending NBA champions Oklahoma City Thunder in the semifinals, ending Oklahoma City's 16-game winning streak. However, the Spurs' tournament run ended with a loss to the New York Knicks in the championship game.

In February 2026, the Spurs went undefeated for the entire month for the first time since March 2014. During this time, the Spurs improved on their 34–48 record from their previous season with their win against the Dallas Mavericks on February 5, and clinched a winning record with their win against the Toronto Raptors on February 25. Victor Wembanyama and De'Aaron Fox were selected as All-Stars, while Mitch Johnson earned a coaching spot in the 2026 NBA All-Star Game.

The Spurs clinched their first playoff berth since the 2018–19 season with their win against the Phoenix Suns on March 19. They also clinched their first division title since the 2016–17 season with their win against the Miami Heat on March 23. The team finished the regular season placing second in the conference with a 62–20 record, having crossed the 60-win threshold for the first time since 2016–17. Wembanyama was named as the unanimous NBA Defensive Player of the Year, while Keldon Johnson was named NBA Sixth Man of the Year.

In the 2026 playoffs, the Spurs defeated the Portland Trail Blazers in five games in the first round and then the Minnesota Timberwolves in six games in the conference semifinals, advancing past both rounds for the first time since 2017. They later dethroned the defending NBA champion Oklahoma City Thunder in seven games in the Western Conference finals, clinching their first Western Conference championship and NBA Finals berth since 2014. In Game 1 of the Western Conference finals, they also snapped Oklahoma City's nine-game playoff winning streak, which began in the 2025 NBA Finals the previous season with the Oklahoma City's Game 7 victory over the Indiana Pacers. However, they lost in five games to the New York Knicks, a rematch of the 2025 NBA Cup championship game that also saw the Spurs lose to the Knicks, despite holding in-game leads for most of the series, including a blown 29-point lead in the third quarter of Game 4, in large part due to a disastrous performance from Fox in the second half of said game.

== Draft ==
Round	Pick	Player	Position	Nationality	College
1	2	Dylan Harper	PG/SG	United States	Rutgers
1	14	Carter Bryant	SF	United States	Arizona
2	38	Kam Jones	PG	United States	Marquette

The Spurs entered the draft holding two first-round selections and one second-round pick. Their own first-round pick marked the third consecutive year that a Spurs selection was placed within the top four of the NBA draft, having previously used such picks to select future Rookie of the Year winners Victor Wembanyama and Stephon Castle. The team's additional first-round pick, which placed 14th, was acquired through a 2022 trade with the Atlanta Hawks involving Dejounte Murray; the Hawks finished as the final team eliminated from playoff contention in the 2025 NBA play-in tournament.

== Roster ==
2025–26 San Antonio Spurs roster
Players

Pos.	No.	Player	Height	Weight	DOB	From
F	40	Harrison Barnes	6 ft 7 in (2.01 m)	225 lb (102 kg)	1992-05-30	North Carolina
C	18	Bismack Biyombo	6 ft 8 in (2.03 m)	255 lb (116 kg)	1992-08-28	Democratic Republic of the Congo
F	11	Carter Bryant	6 ft 6 in (1.98 m)	220 lb (100 kg)	2005-11-26	Arizona
G	5	Stephon Castle	6 ft 6 in (1.98 m)	215 lb (98 kg)	2004-11-01	Connecticut
F	30	Julian Champagnie	6 ft 7 in (2.01 m)	217 lb (98 kg)	2001-06-29	St. John's
G	4	De'Aaron Fox	6 ft 3 in (1.91 m)	185 lb (84 kg)	1997-12-20	Kentucky
G	2	Dylan Harper	6 ft 5 in (1.96 m)	215 lb (98 kg)	2006-03-02	Rutgers
F	55	Harrison Ingram (TW)	6 ft 5 in (1.96 m)	230 lb (104 kg)	2002-11-27	North Carolina
G/F	3	Keldon Johnson	6 ft 6 in (1.98 m)	220 lb (100 kg)	1999-10-11	Kentucky
G	25	David Jones García (TW)	6 ft 4 in (1.93 m)	210 lb (95 kg)	2001-11-24	Memphis
F/C	7	Luke Kornet	7 ft 1 in (2.16 m)	250 lb (113 kg)	1995-07-15	Vanderbilt
G	0	Jordan McLaughlin	5 ft 11 in (1.80 m)	185 lb (84 kg)	1996-04-09	USC
F	14	Emanuel Miller (TW)	6 ft 5 in (1.96 m)	215 lb (98 kg)	2000-06-19	TCU
F/C	8	Kelly Olynyk	7 ft 0 in (2.13 m)	240 lb (109 kg)	1991-04-19	Gonzaga
F/C	45	Mason Plumlee	7 ft 0 in (2.13 m)	254 lb (115 kg)	1990-03-05	Duke
G/F	24	Devin Vassell	6 ft 5 in (1.96 m)	200 lb (91 kg)	2000-08-23	Florida State
F	43	Lindy Waters III	6 ft 5 in (1.96 m)	210 lb (95 kg)	1997-07-28	Oklahoma State
F/C	1	Victor Wembanyama	7 ft 4 in (2.24 m)	235 lb (107 kg)	2004-01-04	France

Coaches
Head coach
- Mitch Johnson
Assistant(s)
- Jimmy Baron
- Josh Brannon
- Brett Brown
- Scott King
- Tim Martin
- Matthew Nielsen
- Mike Noyes
- Sean Sweeney (associate HC)
- L. D. Williams
- Corliss Williamson

Legend
- (DP) Unsigned draft pick
- (FA) Free agent
- (S) Suspended
- (GL) On assignment to G League affiliate
- (TW) Two-way affiliate player
- Injured

Roster
Updated: February 17, 2026

== Standings ==
=== Division ===
Southwest Division	W	L	PCT	GB	Home	Road	Div	GP
y – San Antonio Spurs	62	20	.756	–	32‍–‍8	30‍–‍12	13‍–‍3	82
x – Houston Rockets	52	30	.634	10.0	30‍–‍11	22‍–‍19	10‍–‍6	82
New Orleans Pelicans	26	56	.317	36.0	17‍–‍24	9‍–‍32	7‍–‍9	82
Dallas Mavericks	26	56	.317	36.0	16‍–‍25	10‍–‍31	4‍–‍12	82
Memphis Grizzlies	25	57	.305	37.0	14‍–‍27	11‍–‍30	6‍–‍10	82

=== Conference ===
Western Conference
#	Team	W	L	PCT	GB	GP
1	z – Oklahoma City Thunder *	64	18	.780	–	82
2	y – San Antonio Spurs *	62	20	.756	2.0	82
3	x – Denver Nuggets	54	28	.659	10.0	82
4	y – Los Angeles Lakers *	53	29	.646	11.0	82
5	x – Houston Rockets	52	30	.634	12.0	82
6	x – Minnesota Timberwolves	49	33	.598	15.0	82
7	x – Phoenix Suns	45	37	.549	19.0	82
8	x – Portland Trail Blazers	42	40	.512	22.0	82
9	pi – Los Angeles Clippers	42	40	.512	22.0	82
10	pi – Golden State Warriors	37	45	.451	27.0	82
11	New Orleans Pelicans	26	56	.317	38.0	82
12	Dallas Mavericks	26	56	.317	38.0	82
13	Memphis Grizzlies	25	57	.305	39.0	82
14	Sacramento Kings	22	60	.268	42.0	82
15	Utah Jazz	22	60	.268	42.0	82

== Game log ==
=== Preseason ===
2025 preseason game log
Total: 5–0 (Home: 3–0; Road: 2–0)
Preseason: 5–0 (home: 3–0; road: 2–0)

Game	Date	Team	Score	High points	High rebounds	High assists	Location Attendance	Record
1	October 6	Guangzhou	W 119–88	Champagnie, Johnson, Kornet (16)	Victor Wembanyama (10)	Victor Wembanyama (7)	Frost Bank Center; 15,993	1–0
2	October 8	@ Miami	W 112–108	Keldon Johnson (19)	Luke Kornet (11)	Victor Wembanyama (5)	Kaseya Center; 19,600	2–0
3	October 10	Utah	W 134–130 (OT)	Victor Wembanyama (22)	Victor Wembanyama (7)	Barnes, García (4)	Frost Bank Center; 17,828	3–0
4	October 13	@ Indiana	W 124–108	Victor Wembanyama (27)	Victor Wembanyama (11)	Dylan Harper (8)	Gainbridge Fieldhouse; 10,008	4–0
5	October 17	Indiana	W 133–104	Victor Wembanyama (17)	Victor Wembanyama (12)	Stephon Castle (9)	Frost Bank Center; 18,354	5–0

2025–26 preseason schedule

=== Regular season ===
2025–26 game log
Total: 62–20 (Home: 32–8; Road: 30–12)
October: 5–0 (home: 3–0; road: 2–0)

Game	Date	Team	Score	High points	High rebounds	High assists	Location Attendance	Record
1	October 22	@ Dallas	W 125–92	Victor Wembanyama (40)	Victor Wembanyama (15)	Stephon Castle (6)	American Airlines Center; 20,122	1–0
2	October 24	@ New Orleans	W 120–116 (OT)	Victor Wembanyama (29)	Luke Kornet (12)	Stephon Castle (6)	Smoothie King Center; 18,363	2–0
3	October 26	Brooklyn	W 118–107	Victor Wembanyama (31)	Victor Wembanyama (14)	Dylan Harper (8)	Frost Bank Center; 19,016	3–0
4	October 27	Toronto	W 121–103	Victor Wembanyama (24)	Victor Wembanyama (15)	Dylan Harper (6)	Frost Bank Center; 18,354	4–0
5	October 30	Miami	W 107–101	Victor Wembanyama (27)	Victor Wembanyama (18)	Stephon Castle (8)	Frost Bank Center; 18,702	5–0

November: 8–6 (home: 5–2; road: 3–4)

Game	Date	Team	Score	High points	High rebounds	High assists	Location Attendance	Record
6	November 2	@ Phoenix	L 118–130	Stephon Castle (26)	Victor Wembanyama (9)	Stephon Castle (5)	Mortgage Matchup Center; 17,071	5–1
7	November 5	@ L.A. Lakers	L 116–118	Victor Wembanyama (19)	Victor Wembanyama (8)	Stephon Castle (8)	Crypto.com Arena; 18,997	5–2
8	November 7	Houston	W 121–110	Harrison Barnes (24)	Victor Wembanyama (8)	Stephon Castle (13)	Frost Bank Center; 19,035	6–2
9	November 8	New Orleans	W 126–119	De'Aaron Fox (24)	Victor Wembanyama (18)	Stephon Castle (14)	Frost Bank Center; 18,611	7–2
10	November 10	@ Chicago	W 121–117	Victor Wembanyama (38)	Victor Wembanyama (12)	Stephon Castle (11)	United Center; 21,672	8–2
11	November 12	Golden State	L 120–125	Victor Wembanyama (31)	Victor Wembanyama (15)	Castle, Wembanyama (10)	Frost Bank Center; 18,578	8–3
12	November 14	Golden State	L 108–109	Victor Wembanyama (26)	Victor Wembanyama (12)	De'Aaron Fox (10)	Frost Bank Center; 19,059	8–4
13	November 16	Sacramento	W 123–110	De'Aaron Fox (28)	Keldon Johnson (12)	De'Aaron Fox (11)	Frost Bank Center; 18,354	9–4
14	November 18	Memphis	W 111–101	De'Aaron Fox (26)	Keldon Johnson (7)	Devin Vassell (5)	Frost Bank Center; 18,354	10–4
15	November 20	Atlanta	W 135–126	De'Aaron Fox (26)	Keldon Johnson (7)	De'Aaron Fox (9)	Frost Bank Center; 18,354	11–4
16	November 23	@ Phoenix	L 102–111	De'Aaron Fox (26)	Julian Champagnie (12)	Barnes, Fox, Kornet (3)	Mortgage Matchup Center; 18,186	11–5
17	November 26	@ Portland	W 115–102	De'Aaron Fox (37)	Julian Champagnie (11)	De'Aaron Fox (8)	Moda Center; 19,335	12–5
18	November 28	@ Denver	W 139–136	Devin Vassell (35)	Julian Champagnie (10)	De'Aaron Fox (12)	Ball Arena; 19,936	13–5
19	November 30	@ Minnesota	L 112–125	De'Aaron Fox (25)	Keldon Johnson (8)	De'Aaron Fox (4)	Target Center; 16,979	13–6

December: 11–3 (home: 4–2; road: 7–1)

Game	Date	Team	Score	High points	High rebounds	High assists	Location Attendance	Record
20	December 2	Memphis	W 126–119	Harrison Barnes (31)	Tied (6)	Dylan Harper (6)	Frost Bank Center; 18,354	14–6
21	December 3	@ Orlando	W 114–112	De'Aaron Fox (31)	Kornet, Sochan (7)	Fox, Harper (5)	Kia Center; 17,643	15–6
22	December 5	@ Cleveland	L 117–130	Devin Vassell (28)	Keldon Johnson (7)	De'Aaron Fox (9)	Rocket Arena; 19,432	15–7
23	December 8	@ New Orleans	W 135–132	Harrison Barnes (24)	Luke Kornet (9)	De'Aaron Fox (7)	Smoothie King Center; 15,783	16–7
24	December 10	@ L.A. Lakers	W 132–119	Stephon Castle (30)	Stephon Castle (10)	Stephon Castle (6)	Crypto.com Arena; 18,684	17–7
25	December 13	@ Oklahoma City (in Las Vegas)	W 111–109	Devin Vassell (23)	Victor Wembanyama (9)	Harrison Barnes (5)	T-Mobile Arena; 18,519	18–7
Cup	December 16	@ New York (in Las Vegas)	L 113–124	Dylan Harper (21)	Castle, Harper (7)	Stephon Castle (12)	T-Mobile Arena; 18,609	–
26	December 18	Washington	W 119–94	Dylan Harper (24)	Victor Wembanyama (8)	Stephon Castle (6)	Frost Bank Center; 18,754	19–7
27	December 19	@ Atlanta	W 126–98	Victor Wembanyama (26)	Victor Wembanyama (12)	De'Aaron Fox (8)	State Farm Arena; 15,505	20–7
28	December 21	@ Washington	W 124–113	De'Aaron Fox (27)	Kornet, Wembanyama (12)	Stephon Castle (11)	Capital One Arena; 20,028	21–7
29	December 23	Oklahoma City	W 130–110	Keldon Johnson (25)	Julian Champagnie (10)	Dylan Harper (10)	Frost Bank Center; 19,133	22–7
30	December 25	@ Oklahoma City	W 117–102	De'Aaron Fox (29)	Victor Wembanyama (11)	Stephon Castle (7)	Paycom Center; 18,203	23–7
31	December 27	Utah	L 114–127	Victor Wembanyama (32)	Keldon Johnson (10)	Dylan Harper (12)	Frost Bank Center; 19,060	23–8
32	December 29	Cleveland	L 101–113	Victor Wembanyama (26)	Victor Wembanyama (14)	Stephon Castle (8)	Frost Bank Center; 19,010	23–9
33	December 31	New York	W 134–132	Julian Champagnie (36)	Victor Wembanyama (13)	Castle, Fox (7)	Frost Bank Center; 18,602	24–9

January: 8–7 (home: 4–2; road: 4–5)

Game	Date	Team	Score	High points	High rebounds	High assists	Location Attendance	Record
34	January 2	@ Indiana	W 123–113	De'Aaron Fox (24)	Castle, Champagnie (8)	Stephon Castle (8)	Gainbridge Fieldhouse; 17,013	25–9
35	January 3	Portland	L 110–115	Luke Kornet (23)	Julian Champagnie (10)	Stephon Castle (9)	Frost Bank Center; 18,652	25–10
36	January 6	@ Memphis	L 105–106	Victor Wembanyama (30)	Castle, Champagnie (8)	De'Aaron Fox (8)	FedExForum; 14,551	25–11
37	January 7	L.A. Lakers	W 107–91	Keldon Johnson (27)	Victor Wembanyama (14)	Harrison Barnes (6)	Frost Bank Center; 19,329	26–11
38	January 10	@ Boston	W 100–95	Fox, Wembanyama (21)	Julian Champagnie (13)	De'Aaron Fox (6)	TD Garden; 19,156	27–11
39	January 11	@ Minnesota	L 103–104	Victor Wembanyama (29)	Luke Kornet (12)	Stephon Castle (5)	Target Center; 18,978	27–12
40	January 13	@ Oklahoma City	L 98–119	Stephon Castle (20)	Luke Kornet (8)	Stephon Castle (8)	Paycom Center; 18,203	27–13
41	January 15	Milwaukee	W 119–101	Victor Wembanyama (22)	Julian Champagnie (11)	Stephon Castle (10)	Frost Bank Center; 18,611	28–13
42	January 17	Minnesota	W 126–123	Victor Wembanyama (39)	Victor Wembanyama (9)	De'Aaron Fox (12)	Frost Bank Center; 18,527	29–13
43	January 19	Utah	W 123–110	Victor Wembanyama (33)	Victor Wembanyama (10)	Castle, Fox (8)	Frost Bank Center; 18,354	30–13
44	January 20	@ Houston	L 106–111	Julian Champagnie (27)	Victor Wembanyama (10)	Stephon Castle (8)	Toyota Center; 18,055	30–14
45	January 22	@ Utah	W 126–109	De'Aaron Fox (31)	Victor Wembanyama (14)	Stephon Castle (8)	Delta Center; 18,186	31–14
46	January 25	New Orleans	L 95–104	Victor Wembanyama (16)	Victor Wembanyama (16)	De'Aaron Fox (7)	Frost Bank Center; 18,363	31–15
47	January 28	@ Houston	W 111–99	Victor Wembanyama (28)	Victor Wembanyama (16)	De'Aaron Fox (8)	Toyota Center; 18,055	32–15
48	January 31	@ Charlotte	L 106–111	Dylan Harper (20)	Victor Wembanyama (8)	Stephon Castle (9)	Spectrum Center; 19,533	32–16

February: 11–0 (home: 5–0; road: 6–0)

Game	Date	Team	Score	High points	High rebounds	High assists	Location Attendance	Record
49	February 1	Orlando	W 112–103	Victor Wembanyama (25)	Keldon Johnson (10)	De'Aaron Fox (10)	Frost Bank Center; 18,354	33–16
50	February 4	Oklahoma City	W 116–106	Keldon Johnson (25)	Luke Kornet (15)	De'Aaron Fox (10)	Frost Bank Center; 18,354	34–16
51	February 5	@ Dallas	W 135–123	Victor Wembanyama (29)	Victor Wembanyama (11)	De'Aaron Fox (7)	American Airlines Center; 19,413	35–16
52	February 7	Dallas	W 138–125	Stephon Castle (40)	Stephon Castle (12)	Stephon Castle (12)	Frost Bank Center; 18,617	36–16
53	February 10	@ L.A. Lakers	W 136–108	Victor Wembanyama (40)	Victor Wembanyama (12)	Stephon Castle (7)	Crypto.com Arena; 18,668	37–16
54	February 11	@ Golden State	W 126–113	De'Aaron Fox (27)	Victor Wembanyama (9)	Fox, Harper (8)	Chase Center; 18,064	38–16
All-Star Game
55	February 19	Phoenix	W 121–94	Stephon Castle (20)	Victor Wembanyama (11)	De'Aaron Fox (8)	Moody Center; 16,258	39–16
56	February 21	Sacramento	W 139–122	Victor Wembanyama (28)	Victor Wembanyama (15)	Victor Wembanyama (6)	Moody Center; 16,168	40–16
57	February 23	@ Detroit	W 114–103	Devin Vassell (28)	Victor Wembanyama (17)	Stephon Castle (11)	Little Caesars Arena; 20,062	41–16
58	February 25	@ Toronto	W 110–107	Devin Vassell (21)	Victor Wembanyama (8)	Dylan Harper (7)	Scotiabank Arena; 19,800	42–16
59	February 26	@ Brooklyn	W 126–110	Julian Champagnie (26)	Victor Wembanyama (8)	Dylan Harper (7)	Barclays Center; 17,548	43–16

March: 14–2 (home: 8–1; road: 6–1)

Game	Date	Team	Score	High points	High rebounds	High assists	Location Attendance	Record
60	March 1	@ New York	L 89–114	Victor Wembanyama (25)	Victor Wembanyama (13)	De'Aaron Fox (6)	Madison Square Garden; 19,812	43–17
61	March 3	@ Philadelphia	W 131–91	Harper, Vassell (22)	Bryant, Johnson (9)	Stephon Castle (10)	Xfinity Mobile Arena; 19,746	44–17
62	March 5	Detroit	W 121–106	Victor Wembanyama (38)	Victor Wembanyama (16)	Stephon Castle (12)	Frost Bank Center; 18,748	45–17
63	March 6	L.A. Clippers	W 116–112	Victor Wembanyama (27)	Victor Wembanyama (10)	De'Aaron Fox (9)	Frost Bank Center; 18,711	46–17
64	March 8	Houston	W 145–120	Victor Wembanyama (29)	Victor Wembanyama (8)	De'Aaron Fox (10)	Frost Bank Center; 19,003	47–17
65	March 10	Boston	W 125–116	Victor Wembanyama (39)	Victor Wembanyama (11)	De'Aaron Fox (9)	Frost Bank Center; 19,080	48–17
66	March 12	Denver	L 131–136	Stephon Castle (30)	Stephon Castle (11)	Stephon Castle (10)	Frost Bank Center; 19,038	48–18
67	March 14	Charlotte	W 115–102	Victor Wembanyama (32)	Victor Wembanyama (12)	Stephon Castle (10)	Frost Bank Center; 18,861	49–18
68	March 16	@ L.A. Clippers	W 119–115	Stephon Castle (23)	Victor Wembanyama (13)	Stephon Castle (8)	Intuit Dome; 17,927	50–18
69	March 17	@ Sacramento	W 132–104	Johnson, Wembanyama (18)	Luke Kornet (10)	Stephon Castle (12)	Golden 1 Center; 16,475	51–18
70	March 19	Phoenix	W 101–100	Victor Wembanyama (34)	Victor Wembanyama (12)	Harper, McLaughlin (5)	Frost Bank Center; 18,648	52–18
71	March 21	Indiana	W 134–119	Harper, Johnson (24)	Carter Bryant (9)	De'Aaron Fox (7)	Frost Bank Center; 18,811	53–18
72	March 23	@ Miami	W 136–111	Victor Wembanyama (26)	Victor Wembanyama (15)	Tied (6)	Kaseya Center; 19,784	54–18
73	March 25	@ Memphis	W 123–98	Vassell, Wembanyama (19)	Victor Wembanyama (15)	Stephon Castle (9)	FedExForum; 15,688	55–18
74	March 28	@ Milwaukee	W 127–95	Victor Wembanyama (23)	Victor Wembanyama (15)	Stephon Castle (10)	Fiserv Forum; 17,341	56–18
75	March 30	Chicago	W 129–114	Victor Wembanyama (41)	Victor Wembanyama (16)	Stephon Castle (10)	Frost Bank Center; 18,904	57–18

April: 5–2 (home: 3–1; road: 2–1)

Game	Date	Team	Score	High points	High rebounds	High assists	Location Attendance	Record
76	April 1	@ Golden State	W 127–113	Victor Wembanyama (41)	Victor Wembanyama (18)	Stephon Castle (11)	Chase Center; 18,064	58–18
77	April 2	@ L.A. Clippers	W 118–99	De'Aaron Fox (22)	Devin Vassell (10)	Tied (5)	Intuit Dome; 17,927	59–18
78	April 4	@ Denver	L 134–136 (OT)	Victor Wembanyama (34)	Victor Wembanyama (18)	Stephon Castle (9)	Ball Arena; 20,039	59–19
79	April 6	Philadelphia	W 115–102	Stephon Castle (19)	Stephon Castle (10)	Stephon Castle (13)	Frost Bank Center; 18,354	60–19
80	April 8	Portland	W 112–101	De'Aaron Fox (25)	Johnson, Vassell (8)	De'Aaron Fox (7)	Frost Bank Center; 18,354	61–19
81	April 10	Dallas	W 139–120	Victor Wembanyama (40)	Victor Wembanyama (13)	De'Aaron Fox (10)	Frost Bank Center; 18,681	62–19
82	April 12	Denver	L 118–128	De'Aaron Fox (24)	Stephon Castle (11)	Stephon Castle (9)	Frost Bank Center; 19,019	62–20

2025–26 season schedule

=== Playoffs ===
2026 playoff game log
Total: 13–10 (home: 6–6; road: 7–4)
First round: 4–1 (home: 2–1; road: 2–0)

Game	Date	Team	Score	High points	High rebounds	High assists	Location Attendance	Series
1	April 19	Portland	W 111–98	Victor Wembanyama (35)	Castle, Johnson (7)	De'Aaron Fox (8)	Frost Bank Center; 19,372	1–0
2	April 21	Portland	L 103–106	Stephon Castle (18)	Devin Vassell (12)	Stephon Castle (5)	Frost Bank Center; 19,338	1–1
3	April 24	@ Portland	W 120–108	Stephon Castle (33)	Harper, Kornet (10)	De'Aaron Fox (6)	Moda Center; 20,438	2–1
4	April 26	@ Portland	W 114–93	De'Aaron Fox (28)	Victor Wembanyama (11)	Stephon Castle (8)	Moda Center; 19,717	3–1
5	April 28	Portland	W 114–95	De'Aaron Fox (21)	Victor Wembanyama (14)	De'Aaron Fox (9)	Frost Bank Center; 19,063	4–1

Conference semifinals: 4–2 (home: 2–1; road: 2–1)

Game	Date	Team	Score	High points	High rebounds	High assists	Location Attendance	Series
1	May 4	Minnesota	L 102–104	Dylan Harper (18)	Victor Wembanyama (15)	De'Aaron Fox (6)	Frost Bank Center; 18,827	0–1
2	May 6	Minnesota	W 133–95	Stephon Castle (21)	Victor Wembanyama (15)	Dylan Harper (5)	Frost Bank Center; 19,185	1–1
3	May 8	@ Minnesota	W 115–108	Victor Wembanyama (39)	Victor Wembanyama (15)	Stephon Castle (12)	Target Center; 18,978	2–1
4	May 10	@ Minnesota	L 109–114	Fox, Harper (24)	Luke Kornet (9)	Stephon Castle (4)	Target Center; 18,978	2–2
5	May 12	Minnesota	W 126–97	Victor Wembanyama (27)	Victor Wembanyama (17)	Stephon Castle (6)	Frost Bank Center; 19,345	3–2
6	May 15	@ Minnesota	W 139–109	Stephon Castle (32)	Stephon Castle (11)	De'Aaron Fox (9)	Target Center; 18,978	4–2

Conference finals: 4–3 (home: 2–1; road: 2–2)

Game	Date	Team	Score	High points	High rebounds	High assists	Location Attendance	Series
1	May 18	@ Oklahoma City	W 122–115 (2OT)	Victor Wembanyama (41)	Victor Wembanyama (24)	Stephon Castle (11)	Paycom Center; 18,203	1–0
2	May 20	@ Oklahoma City	L 113–122	Stephon Castle (25)	Victor Wembanyama (17)	Stephon Castle (8)	Paycom Center; 18,203	1–1
3	May 22	Oklahoma City	L 108–123	Victor Wembanyama (26)	Fox, Vassell (7)	Stephon Castle (7)	Frost Bank Center; 19,034	1–2
4	May 24	Oklahoma City	W 103–82	Victor Wembanyama (33)	De'Aaron Fox (10)	Stephon Castle (6)	Frost Bank Center; 19,405	2–2
5	May 26	@ Oklahoma City	L 114–127	Stephon Castle (24)	Julian Champagnie (8)	De'Aaron Fox (8)	Paycom Center; 18,203	2–3
6	May 28	Oklahoma City	W 118–91	Victor Wembanyama (28)	Victor Wembanyama (10)	Stephon Castle (9)	Frost Bank Center; 19,066	3–3
7	May 30	@ Oklahoma City	W 111–103	Victor Wembanyama (22)	Harper, Wembanyama (7)	Stephon Castle (6)	Paycom Center; 18,203	4–3

NBA Finals: 1–4 (home: 0–3; road: 1–1)

Game	Date	Team	Score	High points	High rebounds	High assists	Location Attendance	Series
1	June 3	New York	L 95–105	Victor Wembanyama (26)	Victor Wembanyama (12)	De'Aaron Fox (5)	Frost Bank Center; 18,835	0–1
2	June 5	New York	L 104–105	Victor Wembanyama (29)	Vassell, Wembanyama (9)	Fox, Vassell (5)	Frost Bank Center; 19,014	0–2
3	June 8	@ New York	W 115–111	Victor Wembanyama (32)	Dylan Harper (9)	De'Aaron Fox (8)	Madison Square Garden; 19,812	1–2
4	June 10	@ New York	L 106–107	Victor Wembanyama (24)	Victor Wembanyama (13)	De'Aaron Fox (7)	Madison Square Garden; 19,812	1–3
5	June 13	New York	L 90–94	Dylan Harper (25)	Victor Wembanyama (14)	De'Aaron Fox (5)	Frost Bank Center; 18,984	1–4

2026 playoff schedule

=== NBA Cup ===
==== West Group C ====
Pos	Team	Pld	W	L	PF	PA	PD	Qualification
1	San Antonio Spurs	4	3	1	483	457	+26	Advanced to knockout rounds
2	Denver Nuggets	4	2	2	484	461	+23	
3	Houston Rockets	4	2	2	463	449	+14	
4	Portland Trail Blazers	4	2	2	454	485	−31	
5	Golden State Warriors	4	1	3	436	468	−32	

Source: NBA

== Player statistics ==
Legend
GP	Games played	GS	Games started	MPG	Minutes per game
FG%	Field-goal percentage	3P%	3-point field-goal percentage	FT%	Free-throw percentage
RPG	Rebounds per game	APG	Assists per game	SPG	Steals per game
BPG	Blocks per game	PPG	Points per game

=== Regular season ===
San Antonio Spurs statistics
Player	GP	GS	MPG	FG%	3P%	FT%	RPG	APG	SPG	BPG	PPG
Harrison Barnes	77	52	25.8	.456	.388	.829	2.8	1.9	.6	.2	9.9
Bismack Biyombo	25	1	5.6	.600		.714	1.0	.2	.2	.1	.9
Carter Bryant	71	0	11.5	.408	.335	.714	2.5	.7	.2	.3	4.2
Stephon Castle	68	67	30.0	.471	.332	.734	5.3	7.4	1.1	.3	16.7
Julian Champagnie	82	68	23.6	.415	.371	.904	3.9	1.4	.7	.4	9.9
De'Aaron Fox	72	72	31.0	.486	.332	.760	3.8	6.2	1.2	.3	18.6
Dylan Harper	69	4	22.6	.505	.343	.756	3.4	3.9	.8	.3	11.8
Harrison Ingram	7	0	3.7	.833	1.000		.4	.1	.0	.0	1.6
Keldon Johnson	82	0	23.3	.519	.363	.794	5.4	1.4	.6	.1	13.2
David Jones García	11	0	6.2	.520	.600	.500	1.2	1.6	.5	.1	2.9
Luke Kornet	68	25	21.0	.643		.825	6.1	1.9	.5	1.0	6.5
Jordan McLaughlin	44	0	6.4	.418	.425	.857	.7	.9	.5	.0	2.0
Riley Minix^{†}	3	0	2.7	.667	.333		.7	.3	.3	.0	3.0
Kelly Olynyk	42	0	8.6	.490	.255	.711	1.8	1.2	.4	.1	3.2
Mason Plumlee^{†}	6	1	7.8	1.000		.500	2.2	.7	.7	.0	.8
Jeremy Sochan^{†}	28	0	12.8	.475	.257	.688	2.6	1.0	.4	.2	4.1
Stanley Umude	2	0	3.5	.500	.000		.0	.5	.5	.0	1.0
Devin Vassell	67	65	30.5	.437	.384	.815	4.0	2.5	.9	.4	13.9
Lindy Waters III	40	0	7.1	.375	.342	.667	.7	.5	.2	.0	2.4
Victor Wembanyama	64	55	29.2	.512	.349	.827	11.5	3.1	1.0	3.1	25.0

=== Playoffs ===
San Antonio Spurs statistics
Player	GP	GS	MPG	FG%	3P%	FT%	RPG	APG	SPG	BPG	PPG
Harrison Barnes	20	0	9.2	.333	.231	.824	1.3	.3	.1	.1	2.3
Bismack Biyombo	9	0	2.8	.429			.3	.0	.0	.2	.7
Carter Bryant	22	0	8.5	.500	.414	.333	1.7	.7	.1	.3	2.6
Stephon Castle	23	23	33.0	.459	.350	.816	5.0	6.1	.9	.3	18.2
Julian Champagnie	23	23	30.7	.444	.396	.767	5.7	1.6	1.3	.5	11.2
De'Aaron Fox	21	21	33.5	.414	.294	.758	3.8	6.0	1.3	.4	15.6
Dylan Harper	23	2	26.7	.515	.333	.827	5.6	2.7	1.0	.2	14.1
Keldon Johnson	23	0	17.9	.407	.362	.581	3.3	.9	.7	.1	7.7
Luke Kornet	23	1	12.9	.569	1.000	.773	3.9	.7	.6	.7	3.7
Jordan McLaughlin	10	0	4.6	.636	.600	1.000	.8	1.0	.2	.0	1.9
Kelly Olynyk	9	0	3.9	.533	.625	.572	.8	.3	.4	.0	2.8
Mason Plumlee	6	0	3.0	.667			.7	.3	.0	.5	.7
Devin Vassell	23	23	34.8	.432	.378	.821	5.3	2.7	1.3	.7	13.0
Lindy Waters III	9	0	3.8	.462	.375		.7	.4	.1	.0	1.7
Victor Wembanyama	22	22	34.1	.485	.342	.847	10.9	2.7	1.0	3.5	23.8

- ^{†} Denotes player spent time with another team in the season. Stats reflect time with the Spurs only.

== Transactions ==
=== Trades ===
Date	Trade		Ref.
July 6, 2025	To Indiana Pacers: Draft rights to Kam Jones (No. 38)	To San Antonio Spurs: 2030 second-round pick (from Sacramento); Cash considerations	
July 9, 2025	To San Antonio Spurs: Kelly Olynyk	To Washington Wizards: Malaki Branham; Blake Wesley; 2026 second-round pick (Note: The least favorable of the picks originally belonging to Dallas, Oklahoma City, and Philadelphia.)	

=== Free agency ===
==== Re-signed ====
Date	Player	Ref.
July 12, 2025	Jordan McLaughlin	
September 15, 2025	Bismack Biyombo	

==== Additions ====
Date	Player	Former Team	Ref.
July 7, 2025	Luke Kornet	Boston Celtics	
July 24, 2025	Lindy Waters III	Detroit Pistons	
August 6, 2025	Micah Potter	Utah Jazz	
August 8, 2025	Adam Flagler	Oklahoma City Thunder	
September 2, 2025	Stanley Umude	Milwaukee Bucks	
September 10, 2025	Osayi Osifo	Calgary Surge (Canada)	
September 13, 2025	Isaiah Miller	Austin Spurs (G League)	
February 17, 2026	Mason Plumlee	Oklahoma City Thunder	

==== Subtractions ====
Date	Player	Reason	New Team	Ref.
July 3, 2025	Sandro Mamukelashvili	Contract expired	Toronto Raptors	
July 21, 2025	Chris Paul	Contract expired	Los Angeles Clippers	
September 10, 2025	Charles Bassey	Contract expired	Atlanta Hawks	
September 23, 2025	David Duke Jr.	Contract expired	Phoenix Suns	
February 13, 2026	Jeremy Sochan	Waived	New York Knicks	
