= Julian Champagnie =

American basketball player (born 2001)

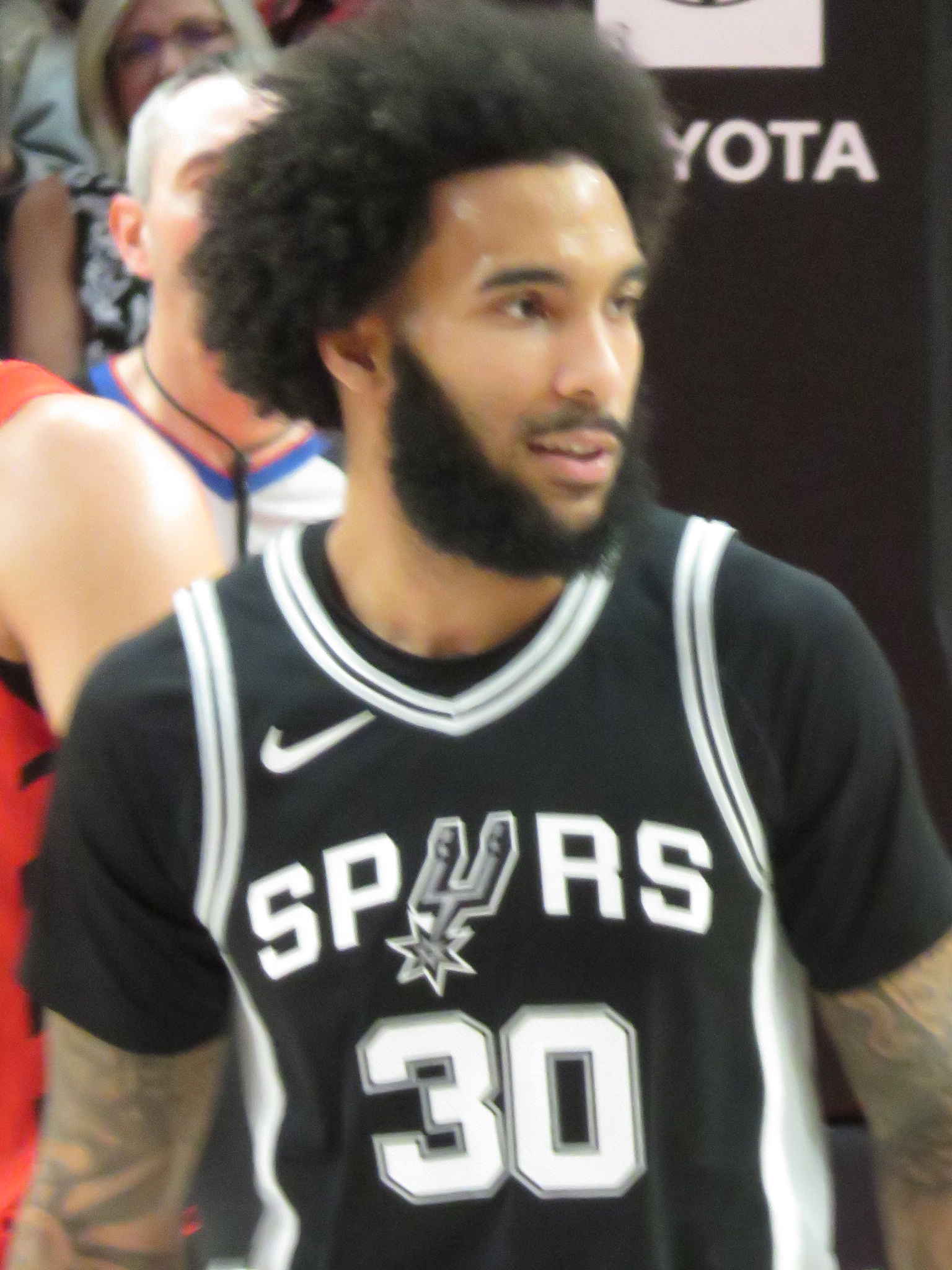
- Champagnie with the San Antonio Spurs in 2024

No. 30 – San Antonio Spurs
- Position: Power forward
- League: NBA

Personal information
- Born: June 29, 2001 (age 25) Brooklyn, New York, U.S.
- Listed height: 6 ft 7 in (2.01 m)
- Listed weight: 217 lb (98 kg)

Career information
- High school: Bishop Loughlin (Brooklyn, New York)
- College: St. John's (2019–2022)
- NBA draft: 2022: undrafted
- Playing career: 2022–present

Career history
- 2022–2023: Philadelphia 76ers
- 2022–2023: →Delaware Blue Coats
- 2023–present: San Antonio Spurs
- 2023: →Austin Spurs

Career highlights
- 2× First-team All-Big East (2021, 2022); Big East co-Most Improved Player (2021); Big East All-Freshman Team (2020)
- Stats at NBA.com
- Stats at Basketball Reference

Julian Kymani Champagnie (/ˌʃæmˈpɛni/ sham-PEH-nee; born June 29, 2001) is an American professional basketball player for the San Antonio Spurs of the National Basketball Association (NBA). He played college basketball for the St. John's Red Storm, where he was a two-time first-team All-Big East selection and led the conference in scoring in 2021.

After going undrafted in the 2022 NBA draft, Champagnie began his career on a two-way contract with the Philadelphia 76ers. He was claimed off waivers by the Spurs in February 2023 and subsequently signed a standard multi-year contract. He established himself as a core piece of the Spurs' rotation, setting the Spurs' single-season franchise record for made three-pointers during the 2025–26 regular season and helping San Antonio reach the 2026 NBA Finals.

== Early life ==
Champagnie was born in Staten Island, New York and grew up in Brooklyn, New York and attended Bishop Loughlin Memorial High School, where he played alongside his twin brother, Justin. He averaged 15 points as a junior, earning Third Team All-Catholic High School Athletic Association (CHSAA) AA honors. As a senior, Champagnie averaged 17.2 points and was named to the First Team All-CHSAA AA. He committed to playing college basketball for St. John's over offers from Pittsburgh, Washington State, Cincinnati and Seton Hall.

== College career ==
On March 4, 2020, Champagnie recorded a freshman season-high 23 points and six rebounds in a 77–55 loss to Butler. In his next game, three days later, he posted 21 points and 12 rebounds in an 88–86 win over Marquette. As a freshman, Champagnie averaged 9.9 points and 6.5 rebounds per game. He was a two-time Big East Freshman of the Week and an All-Freshman Team selection.

On November 30, 2020, Champagnie made his sophomore season debut, recording 29 points and 10 rebounds in a 97–93 win over Boston College. On January 9, 2021, he tallied 33 points and 10 rebounds in a 97–79 loss to seventh-ranked Creighton, the first 30-point double-double by a St. John's player since D'Angelo Harrison in 2015. As a sophomore, Champagnie averaged 19.8 points, 7.4 rebounds, 1.4 steals and one block per game.

Following the season, he declared for the 2021 NBA draft while maintaining his college eligibility. However, on July 4, 2021, he announced he was withdrawing from the draft and returning to St. John's for his junior year. On January 5, 2022, he scored a career-high 34 points in a 89–84 win over DePaul. As a junior, Champagnie averaged 19.2 points, 6.6 rebounds, two steals and 1.1 blocks per game. He was named to the First Team All-Big East as a junior for the second consecutive season. On April 2, 2022, Champagnie declared for the 2022 NBA draft, forgoing his remaining college eligibility. He ultimately went undrafted.

== Professional career ==
=== Philadelphia 76ers (2022–2023) ===
After going undrafted in the 2022 NBA draft, on June 24, 2022, Champagnie signed a two-way contract with the Philadelphia 76ers, splitting time with their NBA G League affiliate, the Delaware Blue Coats. He made two appearances for Philadelphia during his rookie campaign, recording one steal and no points. On February 14, 2023, Champagnie was waived by the 76ers.

=== San Antonio / Austin Spurs (2023–present) ===
On February 16, 2023, the San Antonio Spurs claimed Champagnie off waivers and signed him to a two-way contract.

On July 6, 2023, Champagnie re-signed with the Spurs.

On February 10, 2025, Julian played against his twin brother Justin for the first time in an NBA game, when the Spurs met the Washington Wizards. They are among a very small number of twins who have ever played against one another in an NBA game. Champagnie appeared in all 82 games for San Antonio during the 2024–25 NBA season, averaging 9.9 points, 3.9 rebounds, and 1.4 assists.

On December 31, 2025, Champagnie scored a career-high 36 points off of 11 made three-point field goals in a victory over the New York Knicks. His 11 three-pointers also set a Spurs franchise record for the most three-pointers made in a game. Champagnie went on to finish the 2025–26 regular season with 195 made three-pointers, the most in a single season in Spurs franchise history. He would end up playing in all 82 games for San Antonio (starting 68), averaging 11.1 points, 5.8 rebounds, and 1.5 assists (all career-highs).

On June 29, 2026, Champagnie re-signed with the Spurs on a three-year, $45 million contract.

== Career statistics ==
Legend
GP	Games played	GS	Games started	MPG	Minutes per game
FG%	Field goal percentage	3P%	3-point field goal percentage	FT%	Free throw percentage
RPG	Rebounds per game	APG	Assists per game	SPG	Steals per game
BPG	Blocks per game	PPG	Points per game	**Bold**	Career high
*	Led the league

=== NBA ===
==== Regular season ====
Year	Team	GP	GS	MPG	FG%	3P%	FT%	RPG	APG	SPG	BPG	PPG
2022–23	Philadelphia	2	0	3.3	.000	.000	—	.0	.0	.5	.0	.0
2022–23	San Antonio	15	3	20.9	**.461**	**.407**	.824	4.0	.7	.3	.3	11.0
2023–24	San Antonio	74	59	19.8	.408	.365	.815	2.8	1.4	.6	**.6**	6.8
2024–25	San Antonio	**82***	29	23.6	.415	.371	**.904**	3.9	1.4	.7	.4	9.9
2025–26	San Antonio	**82***	**68**	**27.6**	.437	.381	.844	**5.8**	**1.5**	**.8**	.5	**11.1**
Career		255	159	23.5	.424	.375	.852	4.1	1.4	.7	.5	9.4

==== Playoffs ====
Year	Team	GP	GS	MPG	FG%	3P%	FT%	RPG	APG	SPG	BPG	PPG
2026	San Antonio	23*	23*	30.7	.444	.396	.767	5.7	1.6	1.3	.5	11.2
Career		23	23	30.7	.444	.396	.767	5.7	1.6	1.3	.5	11.2

=== College ===
Year	Team	GP	GS	MPG	FG%	3P%	FT%	RPG	APG	SPG	BPG	PPG
2019–20	St. John's	**32**	26	25.6	**.453**	.312	.754	6.5	.8	1.2	.8	9.9
2020–21	St. John's	25	24	32.9	.433	**.380**	**.887**	**7.4**	1.3	1.4	1.0	**19.8**
2021–22	St. John's	31	**31**	**34.2**	.414	.337	.781	6.6	**2.0**	**2.0**	**1.1**	19.2
Career		88	81	30.7	.429	.348	.815	6.8	1.4	1.5	1.0	16.0

== Personal life ==
Champagnie was born in the United States and is of Jamaican descent. Champagnie's identical twin brother, Justin, plays professional basketball for the Washington Wizards.

Champagnie is a multi-generational New Yorker, raised in Kensington, Brooklyn. His mother's family is from Carroll Gardens, Brooklyn, and his father grew up in the Bronx after immigrating from Jamaica. His father, Ranford, played soccer for St. John's in the mid-1990s and was a member of the 1996 national championship team; Ranford is a professional soccer coach, and has coached the men's soccer teams of Baruch College and York College.
