= 2024–25 San Antonio Spurs season =

- Head coach: Gregg Popovich; Mitch Johnson (acting coach for the rest of the season, starting on November 2, 2024)
- President: Gregg Popovich
- General manager: Brian Wright
- Owner: Peter Holt
- Arena: Frost Bank Center

Results
- Record: 34–48 (.415)
- Place: Division: 4th (Southwest); Conference: 13th (Western)
- Playoff finish: Did not qualify
- Stats at Basketball Reference

Local media
- Television: FanDuel Sports Network Southwest, KENS, KMYS, KNIC-DT (Spanish)
- Radio: 1200 WOAI

The 2024–25 San Antonio Spurs season was the 58th season of the franchise, its 49th in the National Basketball Association (NBA), and its 52nd in the San Antonio area.

On November 2, 2024, five games into the season, longtime head coach Gregg Popovich reportedly experienced a "health issue", later revealed to be a minor stroke, necessitating a leave of absence. Two days later, it was announced that he would need to take an indefinite break from work, with assistant Mitch Johnson stepping in as acting head coach. Popovich's coaching break would later be confirmed to last for the entire season, and in turn, the rest of his coaching career with the Spurs, with Johnson replacing him as head coach following his retirement after 29 seasons. Popovich's unceremonious end to his head coaching career would also mark the last season where an NBA coach that stayed with the team that he coached throughout the 20th century would remain coaching that team for a season, if only briefly. On February 10, the Spurs officially improved on their record from the previous season. On April 6, the Spurs were eliminated from playoff contention for the sixth consecutive season after a loss to the Portland Trail Blazers.

The San Antonio Spurs drew an average home attendance of 17,837, the 17th-highest of all NBA teams.

== Draft ==
Round	Pick	Player	Position	Nationality	School/club team
1	4	Stephon Castle	PG	United States	UConn
1	8	Rob Dillingham	PG	United States	Kentucky
2	35	Johnny Furphy	SG	Australia	Kansas
2	48	Harrison Ingram	SF	United States	North Carolina

The Spurs had two first-round picks and two second-round picks entering the draft (which was two days long instead of one day like it previously had been since the NBA draft was shortened down to two rounds in 1989). The 8th and 48th pick originally belonged to the Toronto Raptors (conveyed to the Spurs after landing outside the top 6 following the draft lottery) and the Los Angeles Lakers, respectively.

== Roster ==
2024–25 San Antonio Spurs roster
Players

Pos.	No.	Player	Height	Weight	DOB	From
F	40	Harrison Barnes	6 ft 8 in (2.03 m)	225 lb (102 kg)	1992-05-30	North Carolina
F/C	28	Charles Bassey	6 ft 10 in (2.08 m)	230 lb (104 kg)	2000-10-28	Western Kentucky
C	18	Bismack Biyombo	6 ft 8 in (2.03 m)	255 lb (116 kg)	1992-08-28	DR Congo
F	22	Malaki Branham	6 ft 4 in (1.93 m)	180 lb (82 kg)	2003-05-12	Ohio State
G	5	Stephon Castle	6 ft 6 in (1.98 m)	215 lb (98 kg)	2004-11-01	Connecticut
F	30	Julian Champagnie	6 ft 7 in (2.01 m)	217 lb (98 kg)	2001-06-29	St. John's
G	7	David Duke Jr. (TW)	6 ft 4 in (1.93 m)	204 lb (93 kg)	1999-10-13	Providence
G	4	De'Aaron Fox	6 ft 3 in (1.91 m)	185 lb (84 kg)	1997-12-20	Kentucky
F	55	Harrison Ingram (TW)	6 ft 5 in (1.96 m)	230 lb (104 kg)	2002-11-27	North Carolina
G/F	0	Keldon Johnson	6 ft 5 in (1.96 m)	220 lb (100 kg)	1999-10-11	Kentucky
F/C	54	Sandro Mamukelashvili	6 ft 9 in (2.06 m)	240 lb (109 kg)	1999-05-23	Seton Hall
G	11	Jordan McLaughlin	6 ft 0 in (1.83 m)	185 lb (84 kg)	1996-04-09	USC
G/F	27	Riley Minix (injured) (TW)	6 ft 7 in (2.01 m)	230 lb (104 kg)	2000-09-22	Morehead State
G	3	Chris Paul	6 ft 0 in (1.83 m)	175 lb (79 kg)	1985-05-06	Wake Forest
F	10	Jeremy Sochan	6 ft 8 in (2.03 m)	230 lb (104 kg)	2003-05-20	Baylor
G/F	24	Devin Vassell	6 ft 5 in (1.96 m)	200 lb (91 kg)	2000-08-23	Florida State
F/C	1	Victor Wembanyama (injured)	7 ft 3 in (2.21 m)	235 lb (107 kg)	2004-01-04	France
G	14	Blake Wesley	6 ft 3 in (1.91 m)	185 lb (84 kg)	2003-03-16	Notre Dame

Coaches
Head coach
- Gregg Popovich
Assistant(s)
- Brett Brown
- Mitch Johnson (interim head coach)
- Matthew Nielsen
- Mike Noyes

Legend
- (DP) Unsigned draft pick
- (FA) Free agent
- (S) Suspended
- (GL) On assignment to G League affiliate
- (TW) Two-way affiliate player
- Injured

Roster
Updated: February 6, 2025

== Standings ==
=== Division ===
Southwest Division	W	L	PCT	GB	Home	Road	Div	GP
y – Houston Rockets	52	30	.634	–	29‍–‍12	23‍–‍18	13‍–‍3	82
x – Memphis Grizzlies	48	34	.585	4.0	26‍–‍15	22‍–‍19	11‍–‍5	82
pi – Dallas Mavericks	39	43	.476	13.0	22‍–‍18	17‍–‍25	8‍–‍8	82
San Antonio Spurs	34	48	.415	18.0	20‍–‍21	14‍–‍27	5‍–‍11	82
New Orleans Pelicans	21	61	.256	31.0	14‍–‍27	7‍–‍34	3‍–‍13	82

=== Conference ===
Western Conference
#	Team	W	L	PCT	GB	GP
1	z – Oklahoma City Thunder *	68	14	.829	–	82
2	y – Houston Rockets *	52	30	.634	16.0	82
3	y – Los Angeles Lakers *	50	32	.610	18.0	82
4	x – Denver Nuggets	50	32	.610	18.0	82
5	x – Los Angeles Clippers	50	32	.610	18.0	82
6	x – Minnesota Timberwolves	49	33	.598	19.0	82
7	x – Golden State Warriors	48	34	.585	20.0	82
8	x – Memphis Grizzlies	48	34	.585	20.0	82
9	pi – Sacramento Kings	40	42	.488	28.0	82
10	pi – Dallas Mavericks	39	43	.476	29.0	82
11	Phoenix Suns	36	46	.439	32.0	82
12	Portland Trail Blazers	36	46	.439	32.0	82
13	San Antonio Spurs	34	48	.415	34.0	82
14	New Orleans Pelicans	21	61	.256	47.0	82
15	Utah Jazz	17	65	.207	51.0	82

== Game log ==
=== Preseason ===
During the preseason, the Spurs would play their final games under what was previously named Bally Sports Southwest. Bally Sports would rebrand itself as the FanDuel Sports Network as of October 21, 2024 before the start of the regular season.

2024 preseason game log
Total: 2–3 (Home: 2–1; Road: 0–2)
Preseason: 2–3 (home: 2–1; road: 0–2)

Game	Date	Team	Score	High points	High rebounds	High assists	Location Attendance	Record
1	October 7	Oklahoma City	L 107–112	Julian Champagnie (22)	Julian Champagnie (7)	Blake Wesley (7)	Frost Bank Center; 15,393	0–1
2	October 9	Orlando	W 107–97	Stephon Castle (17)	Victor Wembanyama (9)	Blake Wesley (5)	Frost Bank Center; 16,952	1–1
3	October 12	Utah	W 126–120	Keldon Johnson (20)	Jeremy Sochan (8)	Chris Paul (8)	Frost Bank Center; 17,635	2–1
4	October 15	@ Miami	L 117–120	Jeremy Sochan (18)	Jeremy Sochan (11)	Castle, Paul (5)	Kaseya Center; 19,600	2–2
5	October 17	@ Houston	L 107–129	Stephon Castle (16)	Bassey, Champagnie (5)	Tre Jones (8)	Toyota Center; 16,424	2–3

2024–25 preseason schedule

=== Regular season ===
2024–25 game log
Total: 34–48 (Home: 20–21; Road: 14–27)
October: 2–3 (home: 1–1; road: 1–2)

Game	Date	Team	Score	High points	High rebounds	High assists	Location Attendance	Record
1	October 24	@ Dallas	L 109–120	Champagnie, Sochan (18)	Victor Wembanyama (9)	Chris Paul (8)	American Airlines Center; 20,373	0–1
2	October 26	Houston	W 109–106	Victor Wembanyama (29)	Jeremy Sochan (12)	Chris Paul (9)	Frost Bank Center; 18,715	1–1
3	October 28	Houston	L 101–106	Jeremy Sochan (22)	Victor Wembanyama (20)	Castle, Wembanyama (5)	Frost Bank Center; 17,519	1–2
4	October 30	@ Oklahoma City	L 93–105	Harrison Barnes (18)	Jeremy Sochan (9)	Chris Paul (9)	Paycom Center; 17,136	1–3
5	October 31	@ Utah	W 106–88	Victor Wembanyama (25)	Victor Wembanyama (9)	Chris Paul (10)	Delta Center; 18,175	2–3

November: 8–6 (home: 7–3; road: 1–3)

Game	Date	Team	Score	High points	High rebounds	High assists	Location Attendance	Record
6	November 2	Minnesota	W 113–103	Keldon Johnson (25)	Jeremy Sochan (10)	Chris Paul (13)	Frost Bank Center; 18,257	3–3
7	November 4	@ L.A. Clippers	L 104–113	Victor Wembanyama (24)	Victor Wembanyama (13)	Chris Paul (10)	Intuit Dome; 15,927	3–4
8	November 6	@ Houston	L 100–127	Victor Wembanyama (15)	Sandro Mamukelashvili (7)	Chris Paul (4)	Toyota Center; 16,208	3–5
9	November 7	Portland	W 118–105	Branham, Johnson (17)	Keldon Johnson (11)	Blake Wesley (8)	Frost Bank Center; 17,120	4–5
10	November 9	Utah	L 110–111	Victor Wembanyama (24)	Victor Wembanyama (16)	Chris Paul (9)	Frost Bank Center; 18,354	4–6
11	November 11	Sacramento	W 116–96	Victor Wembanyama (34)	Victor Wembanyama (14)	Chris Paul (11)	Frost Bank Center; 17,163	5–6
12	November 13	Washington	W 139–130	Victor Wembanyama (50)	Barnes, Collins (7)	Chris Paul (11)	Frost Bank Center; 16,602	6–6
13	November 15	L.A. Lakers	L 115–120	Victor Wembanyama (28)	Victor Wembanyama (14)	Chris Paul (11)	Frost Bank Center; 18,916	6–7
14	November 16	@ Dallas	L 93–110	Zach Collins (20)	Bassey, Collins, Mamukelashvili (6)	Tre Jones (4)	American Airlines Center; 20,311	6–8
15	November 19	Oklahoma City	W 110–104	Keldon Johnson (22)	Barnes, Bassey (8)	Chris Paul (11)	Frost Bank Center; 16,667	7–8
16	November 21	Utah	W 126–118	Harrison Barnes (25)	Harrison Barnes (10)	Chris Paul (10)	Frost Bank Center; 17,087	8–8
17	November 23	Golden State	W 104–94	Victor Wembanyama (25)	Barnes, Mamukelashvili (8)	Victor Wembanyama (9)	Frost Bank Center; 18,847	9–8
18	November 26	@ Utah	W 128–115	Victor Wembanyama (34)	Harrison Barnes (8)	Tre Jones (7)	Delta Center; 18,175	10–8
19	November 27	L.A. Lakers	L 101–119	Victor Wembanyama (20)	Victor Wembanyama (10)	Stephon Castle (7)	Frost Bank Center; 19,120	10–9

December: 7–7 (home: 4–3; road: 3–4)

Game	Date	Team	Score	High points	High rebounds	High assists	Location Attendance	Record
20	December 1	@ Sacramento	W 127–125	Victor Wembanyama (34)	Victor Wembanyama (14)	Victor Wembanyama (11)	Golden 1 Center; 16,014	11–9
21	December 3	@ Phoenix	L 93–104	Devin Vassell (25)	Victor Wembanyama (13)	Chris Paul (8)	Footprint Center; 17,071	11–10
22	December 5	Chicago	L 124–139	Keldon Johnson (28)	Jeremy Sochan (14)	Chris Paul (9)	Frost Bank Center; 17,720	11–11
23	December 6	Sacramento	L 113–140	Julian Champagnie (30)	Chris Paul (8)	Chris Paul (13)	Frost Bank Center; 16,796	11–12
24	December 8	New Orleans	W 121–116	Victor Wembanyama (25)	Charles Bassey (12)	Chris Paul (10)	Frost Bank Center; 16,840	12–12
25	December 13	@ Portland	W 118–116	Victor Wembanyama (28)	Victor Wembanyama (7)	Blake Wesley (8)	Moda Center; 17,025	13–12
26	December 15	Minnesota	L 92–106	Victor Wembanyama (20)	Jeremy Sochan (15)	Chris Paul (9)	Frost Bank Center; 16,816	13–13
27	December 19	Atlanta	W 133–126 (OT)	Victor Wembanyama (42)	Jeremy Sochan (8)	Chris Paul (8)	Frost Bank Center; 17,852	14–13
28	December 21	Portland	W 114–94	Victor Wembanyama (30)	Charles Bassey (12)	Chris Paul (9)	Frost Bank Center; 18,354	15–13
29	December 23	@ Philadelphia	L 106–111	Victor Wembanyama (26)	Victor Wembanyama (9)	Chris Paul (8)	Wells Fargo Center; 19,986	15–14
30	December 25	@ New York	L 114–117	Victor Wembanyama (42)	Victor Wembanyama (18)	Tre Jones (9)	Madison Square Garden; 19,812	15–15
31	December 27	@ Brooklyn	W 96–87	Victor Wembanyama (19)	Jeremy Sochan (14)	Tre Jones (6)	Barclays Center; 17,990	16–15
32	December 29	@ Minnesota	L 110–112	Victor Wembanyama (34)	Victor Wembanyama (8)	Chris Paul (14)	Target Center; 18,978	16–16
33	December 31	L.A. Clippers	W 122–86	Victor Wembanyama (27)	Paul, Wembanyama (9)	Victor Wembanyama (5)	Frost Bank Center; 18,690	17–16

January: 4–8 (home: 1–5; road: 3–3)

Game	Date	Team	Score	High points	High rebounds	High assists	Location Attendance	Record
34	January 3	@ Denver	W 113–110	Victor Wembanyama (35)	Victor Wembanyama (18)	Chris Paul (11)	Ball Arena; 19,922	18–16
35	January 4	Denver	L 111–122 (OT)	Harrison Barnes (22)	Victor Wembanyama (23)	Chris Paul (8)	Frost Bank Center; 19,038	18–17
36	January 6	@ Chicago	L 110–114	Victor Wembanyama (23)	Victor Wembanyama (14)	Chris Paul (9)	United Center; 18,886	18–18
37	January 8	@ Milwaukee	L 105–121	Keldon Johnson (24)	Keldon Johnson (11)	Chris Paul (7)	Fiserv Forum; 17,341	18–19
—	January 11	@ L.A. Lakers	Postponed due to the January 2025 Southern California wildfires. Makeup date March 17.					
38	January 13	@ L.A. Lakers	W 126–102	Castle, Vassell, Wembanyama (23)	Charles Bassey (9)	Chris Paul (10)	Crypto.com Arena; 18,737	19–19
39	January 15	Memphis	L 115–129	Stephon Castle (26)	Victor Wembanyama (12)	Chris Paul (5)	Frost Bank Center; 18,354	19–20
40	January 17	Memphis	L 112–140	Devin Vassell (21)	Victor Wembanyama (12)	Barnes, Paul (6)	Frost Bank Center; 18,354	19–21
41	January 19	@ Miami	L 107–128	Devin Vassell (23)	Victor Wembanyama (10)	Chris Paul (9)	Kaseya Center; 19,828	19–22
42	January 23	@ Indiana	W 140–110	Victor Wembanyama (30)	Victor Wembanyama (11)	Tre Jones (8)	(France) Accor Arena; 15,935	20–22
43	January 25	Indiana	L 98–136	Harrison Barnes (25)	Victor Wembanyama (12)	Chris Paul (8)	(France) Accor Arena; 15,979	20–23
44	January 29	L.A. Clippers	L 116–128	Victor Wembanyama (23)	Victor Wembanyama (12)	Barnes, Paul (7)	Frost Bank Center; 18,354	20–24
45	January 31	Milwaukee	W 144–118	Victor Wembanyama (30)	Victor Wembanyama (14)	Chris Paul (9)	Frost Bank Center; 17,804	21–24

February: 3–9 (home: 1–2; road: 2–7)

Game	Date	Team	Score	High points	High rebounds	High assists	Location Attendance	Record
46	February 1	Miami	L 103–105	Keldon Johnson (19)	Charles Bassey (15)	Chris Paul (7)	Frost Bank Center; 18,354	21–25
47	February 3	@ Memphis	L 109–128	Victor Wembanyama (27)	Victor Wembanyama (10)	Chris Paul (8)	FedExForum; 16,575	21–26
48	February 5	@ Atlanta	W 126–125	Fox, Wembanyama (24)	Victor Wembanyama (12)	De'Aaron Fox (13)	State Farm Arena; 17,191	22–26
49	February 7	@ Charlotte	L 116–117	Stephon Castle (33)	Jeremy Sochan (12)	Chris Paul (7)	Spectrum Center; 19,290	22–27
50	February 8	@ Orlando	L 111–112	Devin Vassell (25)	Victor Wembanyama (9)	De'Aaron Fox (9)	Kia Center; 19,354	22–28
51	February 10	@ Washington	W 131–121	Victor Wembanyama (31)	Victor Wembanyama (15)	Chris Paul (9)	Capital One Arena; 17,446	23–28
52	February 12	@ Boston	L 103–116	De'Aaron Fox (23)	Victor Wembanyama (13)	Chris Paul (8)	TD Garden; 19,156	23–29
All-Star Game
53	February 20	Phoenix	W 120–109	De'Aaron Fox (26)	Stephon Castle (10)	Chris Paul (10)	Moody Center; 16,246	24–29
54	February 21	Detroit	L 110–125	Keldon Johnson (28)	Sandro Mamukelashvili (7)	Fox, Johnson (5)	Moody Center; 16,143	24–30
55	February 23	@ New Orleans	L 96–114	Champagnie, Johnson (18)	Bismack Biyombo (10)	Chris Paul (7)	Smoothie King Center; 17,399	24–31
56	February 25	@ New Orleans	L 103–109	Devin Vassell (20)	Bismack Biyombo (12)	Chris Paul (10)	Smoothie King Center; 16,767	24–32
57	February 26	@ Houston	L 106–118	Castle, Johnson (22)	Stephon Castle (7)	Castle, Wesley (5)	Toyota Center; 18,055	24–33

March: 7–10 (home: 5–5; road: 2–5)

Game	Date	Team	Score	High points	High rebounds	High assists	Location Attendance	Record
58	March 1	@ Memphis	W 130–128	Stephon Castle (24)	Jeremy Sochan (11)	Chris Paul (8)	FedExForum; 16,822	25–33
59	March 2	Oklahoma City	L 132–146	Stephon Castle (32)	Stephon Castle (8)	Chris Paul (6)	Frost Bank Center; 17,745	25–34
60	March 4	Brooklyn	W 127–113	Devin Vassell (37)	Bismack Biyombo (14)	Fox, Paul (7)	Frost Bank Center; 16,703	26–34
61	March 7	@ Sacramento	L 109–127	Stephon Castle (25)	Jeremy Sochan (8)	De'Aaron Fox (8)	Golden 1 Center; 18,332	26–35
62	March 9	@ Minnesota	L 124–141	De'Aaron Fox (22)	Stephon Castle (7)	Chris Paul (7)	Target Center; 17,875	26–36
63	March 10	Dallas	L 129–133	Harrison Barnes (29)	Harrison Barnes (8)	Chris Paul (9)	Frost Bank Center; 17,735	26–37
64	March 12	Dallas	W 126–116	De'Aaron Fox (32)	Devin Vassell (10)	De'Aaron Fox (11)	Frost Bank Center; 18,354	27–37
65	March 14	Charlotte	L 134–145	Stephon Castle (26)	Champagnie, Johnson (5)	Bismack Biyombo (4)	Spectrum Center; 18,510	27–38
66	March 15	New Orleans	W 119–115	Devin Vassell (22)	Sandro Mamukelashvili (7)	Stephon Castle (7)	Frost Bank Center; 18,549	28–38
67	March 17	@ L.A. Lakers	L 109–125	Stephon Castle (23)	Castle, Vassell (8)	Chris Paul (8)	Crypto.com Arena; 17,723	28–39
68	March 19	New York	W 120–105	Sandro Mamukelashvili (34)	Keldon Johnson (10)	Chris Paul (9)	Frost Bank Center; 18,521	29–39
69	March 21	Philadelphia	W 128–120	Jeremy Sochan (23)	Jeremy Sochan (9)	Stephon Castle (14)	Frost Bank Center; 17,803	30–39
70	March 23	@ Toronto	W 123–89	Devin Vassell (25)	Bismack Biyombo (9)	Chris Paul (6)	Scotiabank Arena; 18,276	31–39
71	March 25	@ Detroit	L 96–122	Devin Vassell (26)	Bismack Biyombo (7)	Stephon Castle (4)	Little Caesars Arena; 19,511	31–40
72	March 27	@ Cleveland	L 116–124	Castle, Vassell (22)	Stephon Castle (11)	Stephon Castle (8)	Rocket Arena; 19,432	31–41
73	March 29	Boston	L 111–121	Keldon Johnson (23)	Jeremy Sochan (8)	Stephon Castle (8)	Frost Bank Center; 18,674	31–42
74	March 30	Golden State	L 106–148	Keldon Johnson (19)	Sandro Mamukelashvili (11)	Mamukelashvili, McLaughlin, Paul (4)	Frost Bank Center; 18,558	31–43

April: 3–5 (home: 1–2; road: 2–3)

Game	Date	Team	Score	High points	High rebounds	High assists	Location Attendance	Record
75	April 1	Orlando	L 105–116	Harrison Barnes (24)	Stephon Castle (8)	Chris Paul (7)	Frost Bank Center; 17,770	31–44
76	April 2	@ Denver	W 113–106	Harrison Barnes (20)	Stephon Castle (15)	Stephon Castle (9)	Ball Arena; 19,524	32–44
77	April 4	Cleveland	L 113–114	Devin Vassell (24)	Bismack Biyombo (10)	Stephon Castle (11)	Frost Bank Center; 17,819	32–45
78	April 6	@ Portland	L 109–120	Stephon Castle (22)	Barnes, Castle, Vassell (7)	Chris Paul (9)	Moda Center; 17,928	32–46
79	April 8	@ L.A. Clippers	L 117–122	Harrison Barnes (24)	Bismack Biyombo (8)	Stephon Castle (8)	Intuit Dome; 17,927	32–47
80	April 9	@ Golden State	W 114–111	Castle, Johnson (21)	Johnson, Mamukelashvili (8)	Stephon Castle (5)	Chase Center; 18,064	33–47
81	April 11	@ Phoenix	L 98–117	Julian Champagnie (23)	Sandro Mamukelashvili (9)	Stephon Castle (10)	PHX Arena; 17,071	33–48
82	April 13	Toronto	W 125–118	Keldon Johnson (23)	Keldon Johnson (9)	Castle, Paul (6)	Frost Bank Center; 18,672	34–48

2024–25 season schedule

=== NBA Cup ===
The groups were revealed during the tournament announcement on July 12, 2024.

==== West Group B ====
Pos	Team	Pld	W	L	PF	PA	PD	Qualification
1	Oklahoma City Thunder	4	3	1	437	392	+45	Advance to knockout stage
2	Phoenix Suns	4	3	1	434	404	+30	
3	Los Angeles Lakers	4	2	2	437	461	−24	
4	San Antonio Spurs	4	2	2	446	443	+3	
5	Utah Jazz	4	0	4	451	505	−54	

Source: NBA
Rules for classification: Tiebreakers

2023–24 game log
Total: 2-2 (Home: 1-1; Road: 1-1)
In-Season Tournament: 2–2 (home: 1–1; road: 1–1)

Game	Date	Team	Score	High points	High rebounds	High assists	Location Attendance	Record
1	November 15	L.A. Lakers	L 115–120	Victor Wembanyama (28)	Victor Wembanyama (14)	Chris Paul (11)	Frost Bank Center; 18,916	0–1
2	November 19	Oklahoma City	W 110–104	Keldon Johnson (22)	Barnes, Bassey (8)	Chris Paul (11)	Frost Bank Center; 16,667	1–1
3	November 26	@ Utah	W 128–115	Victor Wembanyama (34)	Harrison Barnes (8)	Tre Jones (7)	Delta Center; 18,175	2–1
21	December 3	@ Phoenix	L 93–104	Devin Vassell (25)	Victor Wembanyama (13)	Chris Paul (8)	Footprint Center; 17,071	2–2

2023–24 season schedule

== Player statistics ==
Legend
GP	Games played	GS	Games started	MPG	Minutes per game
FG%	Field-goal percentage	3P%	3-point field-goal percentage	FT%	Free-throw percentage
RPG	Rebounds per game	APG	Assists per game	SPG	Steals per game
BPG	Blocks per game	PPG	Points per game

=== Regular season ===
San Antonio Spurs statistics
Player	GP	GS	MPG	FG%	3P%	FT%	RPG	APG	SPG	BPG	PPG
Harrison Barnes	82	82	27.2	.508	.433	.809	3.8	1.7	.5	.2	12.3
Charles Bassey	36	1	10.4	.581		.636	4.2	.5	.4	.8	4.4
Bismack Biyombo	28	26	18.9	.588		.400	5.6	1.1	.6	.8	5.1
Malaki Branham	47	0	9.1	.458	.405	.818	1.1	.8	.2	.0	5.0
Stephon Castle	81	47	26.7	.428	.285	.724	3.7	4.1	.9	.3	14.7
Julian Champagnie	82	29	23.6	.415	.371	.904	3.9	1.4	.7	.4	9.9
Sidy Cissoko^{†}	17	0	3.2	.500	.429	.167	.6	.4	.1	.0	1.3
Zach Collins^{†}	36	4	11.8	.462	.304	.886	2.8	1.4	.4	.4	4.6
David Duke Jr.	6	0	5.7	.429	.500	.500	.8	.7	.2	.0	2.7
De'Aaron Fox^{†}	17	17	34.0	.446	.274	.819	4.3	6.8	1.5	.3	19.7
Harrison Ingram	5	0	7.0	.500	.000		1.8	.6	.6	.0	.8
Keldon Johnson	77	0	23.9	.482	.318	.773	4.8	1.6	.6	.3	12.7
Tre Jones^{†}	28	0	16.1	.484	.308	.758	2.1	3.7	.6	.2	4.4
Sandro Mamukelashvili	61	0	11.2	.502	.373	.741	3.1	.8	.4	.3	6.3
Jordan McLaughlin^{†}	18	0	6.9	.536	.450	1.000	.5	1.5	.3	.1	2.5
Riley Minix	1	0	7.0	.000	.000		2.0	.0	.0	.0	.0
Chris Paul	82	82	28.0	.427	.377	.924	3.6	7.4	1.3	.3	8.8
Jeremy Sochan	54	23	25.3	.535	.308	.696	6.5	2.4	.8	.5	11.4
Devin Vassell	64	53	31.0	.443	.368	.792	4.0	2.9	1.3	.5	16.3
Victor Wembanyama	46	46	33.2	.476	.352	.836	11.0	3.7	1.1	3.8	24.3
Blake Wesley	58	0	11.8	.435	.293	.623	1.1	2.0	.6	.1	3.7

- ^{†} Denotes player spent time with another team in the season. Stats reflect time with the Spurs only.

== Transactions ==
=== Trades ===
June 26, 2024	To San Antonio Spurs 2030 MIN protected first-round pick swap right 2031 MIN first-round pick	To Minnesota Timberwolves Draft rights to Rob Dillingham (No. 8)
July 6, 2024	To San Antonio Spurs Cash considerations	To Charlotte Hornets Devonte' Graham; 2025 NOP second-round pick
July 6, 2024	To San Antonio Spurs Draft rights to Juan Núñez (No. 36); Cash considerations	To Indiana Pacers Draft rights to Johnny Furphy (No. 35)
July 8, 2024	Three-team trade
July 8, 2024	To San Antonio Spurs Harrison Barnes (from Sacramento); 2031 first-round pick swap right (from Sacramento)	To Chicago Bulls Chris Duarte (from Sacramento); RaiQuan Gray (two-way contract) (from San Antonio); Two future second-round picks (from Sacramento); Cash considerations (from Sacramento)
July 8, 2024	To Sacramento Kings DeMar DeRozan (sign-and-trade) (from Chicago)
February 3, 2025	Three-team trade
February 3, 2025	To San Antonio Spurs De'Aaron Fox (from Sacramento); Jordan McLaughlin (from Sacramento)	To Chicago Bulls Zach Collins (from San Antonio); Kevin Huerter (from Sacramento); Tre Jones (from San Antonio); 2025 CHI first-round pick (from San Antonio)
February 3, 2025	To Sacramento Kings Sidy Cissoko (from San Antonio); Zach LaVine (from Chicago); 2025 CHA protected first-round pick (from San Antonio); 2025 CHI second-round pick (from San Antonio); 2027 SAS first-round pick (from San Antonio); 2028 DEN protected second-round pick (from San Antonio); 2028 SAC second-round pick (from Chicago); 2031 MIN first-round pick (from San Antonio)

=== Free agency ===
==== Additions ====
Player	Signed	Former Team	Ref.
Chris Paul	July 7, 2024	Golden State Warriors	
