= Carter Bryant (basketball) =

American professional basketball player (born 2005)

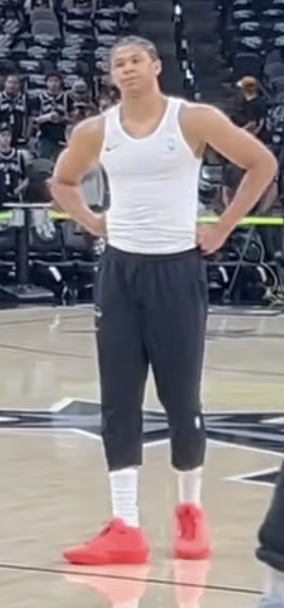
- Bryant in 2026

No. 11 – San Antonio Spurs
- Position: Small forward
- League: NBA

Personal information
- Born: November 26, 2005 (age 20) Riverside, California, U.S.
- Listed height: 6 ft 6 in (1.98 m)
- Listed weight: 220 lb (100 kg)

Career information
- High school: Fountain Valley (Fountain Valley, California); Sage Hill School (Newport Beach, California); Centennial (Corona, California)
- College: Arizona (2024–2025)
- NBA draft: 2025: 1st round, 14th overall pick
- Drafted by: San Antonio Spurs
- Playing career: 2025–present

Career history
- 2025–present: San Antonio Spurs
- 2026: →Austin Spurs

Career highlights
- McDonald's All-American (2024); Jordan Brand Classic (2024); Rising Stars Challenge Champion (2026)
- Stats at NBA.com
- Stats at Basketball Reference

Carter Dayne Bryant (born November 26, 2005) is an American professional basketball player for the San Antonio Spurs of the National Basketball Association (NBA). He played college basketball for the Arizona Wildcats and was selected by the Spurs 14th overall in the 2025 NBA draft.

== Early life and high school career ==
Bryant grew up in Riverside, California and initially attended Fountain Valley High School, where he was coached by his father D'Cean. He transferred to the Sage Hill School in Newport Beach, California after his father was hired to coach at the school. Bryant was named the Pacific Coast Conference MVP after averaging 22.1 points, 13.7 rebounds, four assists, 2.9 blocks, and 1.6 steals per game as a junior. He transferred a second time to Centennial High School in Corona, California before the start of his senior year. Bryant was selected to play in the 2024 McDonald's All-American Boys Game during his senior year.

=== Recruiting ===
Bryant was a consensus four-star recruit and one of the top players in the 2024 class, according to major recruiting services. On April 26, 2023, he committed to playing college basketball for Arizona after considering an offer from Louisville.

College recruiting
Name	Hometown	School	Height	Weight	Commit date
Carter Bryant; SF / PF	Riverside, CA	Centennial (CA)	6 ft 8 in (2.03 m)	220 lb (100 kg)	Apr 26, 2023
Carter Bryant; SF / PF	Recruit ratings: Rivals: 247Sports: On3: ESPN: (89)				
Overall recruit ranking: Rivals: 30 247Sports: 28 On3: 14 ESPN: 20
Note: In many cases, Scout, Rivals, 247Sports, On3, and ESPN may conflict in their listings of height and weight.; In these cases, the average was taken. ESPN grades are on a 100-point scale.; Sources: "Arizona 2024 Basketball Commitments". Rivals.; "2024 Arizona Wildcats Recruiting Class". ESPN.; "2024 Team Ranking". Rivals.

== College career ==
Bryant started five games as a freshman and averaged 6.5 points per game.

In a more limited role on a talented and veteran-led Arizona team, Bryant showed consistent signs of NBA potential. Following the season, he declared for the 2025 NBA draft.

== Professional career ==
On June 25, 2025, Bryant was selected with the 14th overall pick by the San Antonio Spurs in the 2025 NBA draft. Bryant was later included in the 2025 NBA Summer League roster of the Spurs. On July 3, 2025, the Spurs announced that they signed Bryant. On January 8, 2026, Bryant received his first assignment to the Austin Spurs.

Bryant took part in the 2026 NBA Slam Dunk Contest, where he finished in second place with 93 points, including the contest's only 50-point dunk.

== Career statistics ==
Legend
GP	Games played	GS	Games started	MPG	Minutes per game
FG%	Field goal percentage	3P%	3-point field goal percentage	FT%	Free throw percentage
RPG	Rebounds per game	APG	Assists per game	SPG	Steals per game
BPG	Blocks per game	PPG	Points per game	**Bold**	Career high

=== NBA ===
==== Regular season ====
Year	Team	GP	GS	MPG	FG%	3P%	FT%	RPG	APG	SPG	BPG	PPG
2025–26	San Antonio	71	0	11.5	.408	.335	.714	2.5	.7	.2	.3	4.2
Career		71	0	11.5	.408	.335	.714	2.5	.7	.2	.3	4.2

==== Playoffs ====
Year	Team	GP	GS	MPG	FG%	3P%	FT%	RPG	APG	SPG	BPG	PPG
2026	San Antonio	22	0	8.5	.500	.414	.333	1.7	.7	.1	.3	2.6
Career		22	0	8.5	.500	.414	.333	1.7	.7	.1	.3	2.6

=== College ===
Year	Team	GP	GS	MPG	FG%	3P%	FT%	RPG	APG	SPG	BPG	PPG
2024–25	Arizona	37	5	19.3	.460	.371	.695	4.1	1.0	0.9	1.0	6.5

== Personal life ==
Bryant is a grandchild of deaf adults. His maternal grandparents graduated from Gallaudet University, the first school for the advanced education of the deaf and hard of hearing in the world. His grandfather, Mike “Doc” Torres, played for Gallaudet's basketball team and later became a member of the USA Deaf Basketball Hall of Fame. His grandmother, Shelly Freed, is a longtime educator and administrator at the California School for the Deaf, Riverside. His father, D’Cean Bryant, was a coach for the girls' basketball team at the school, after playing four seasons of college basketball at Long Beach State. His mother, Sabrina Torres, is a sign language interpreter.

Fluent in American Sign Language, Bryant became an ambassador for Gallaudet University in the lead-up to the 2025 NBA draft.
