= R. C. Buford =

American basketball executive (born 1960)

San Antonio Spurs
- Position: Chief executive officer
- League: NBA

Personal information
- Born: May 16, 1960 (age 66) Wichita, Kansas, U.S.

Career information
- College: Texas A&M (1979–1980)
- Coaching career: 1983–1994

Career history

Coaching
- 1983–1988: Kansas (assistant)
- 1988–1992: San Antonio Spurs (assistant)
- 1992–1993: Los Angeles Clippers (assistant)
- 1993–1994: Florida (assistant)

Career highlights
- As assistant coach: NCAA champion (1988); As executive: 5× NBA champion (1999, 2003, 2005, 2007, 2014); 2× NBA Executive of the Year (2014, 2016)

Robert Canterbury Buford (born May 16, 1960) is an American basketball executive who is the CEO of the San Antonio Spurs of the National Basketball Association (NBA). He was named general manager in 2002 after five seasons serving as team president. Buford is also the president of sports franchises for Spurs Sports & Entertainment. Buford has won the NBA Executive of the Year award twice, for the 2013‍–‍14 and 2015‍–‍16 seasons, before his promotion to CEO prior to the start of the 2019‍–‍20 season.

== Early life ==
Buford's father, Bob, was a successful oilman and rancher in Wichita, Kansas.

Buford spent two seasons as a walk-on for the Texas A&M Aggies. He transferred to the Oklahoma State Cowboys in 1980. Buford sat out the 1980‍–‍81 season and then suffered eight broken ribs in a car crash, ending his playing career.

Buford graduated from Friends University with a Bachelor of Science in management.

== Coaching career ==
Buford started his coaching career in 1983 as an assistant with the Kansas Jayhawks. He spent five seasons with the team and was a member of the coaching staff when the Jayhawks won the 1988 NCAA championship.

Buford first joined the Spurs in the summer of 1988 as an assistant coach on Larry Brown's staff. He spent four seasons as an assistant with the Spurs, including the 1989‍–‍90 and 1990‍–‍91 seasons when the team captured back-to-back Midwest Division titles. In the summer of 1992, he became the number-one assistant for Brown with the Los Angeles Clippers. He spent one season with the Clippers before moving to the University of Florida for the 1993‍–‍94 season.

== NBA executive career ==
Spurs general manager Gregg Popovich then hired Buford as the Spurs' head scout in the summer of 1994 and he has been with the team since that time. In the summer of 1997 he was named the Spurs' director of scouting, and then two years later in 1999 was promoted to the position of assistant general manager. He was named general manager in 2002.

Buford has won five NBA championships with the Spurs (1999, 2003, 2005, 2007, 2014), four as general manager (2003, 2005, 2007, 2014).

Buford won the 2013–14 NBA Basketball Executive of the Year award on May 7, 2014, and later won the same honor for the 2015‍–‍16 season.

On July 23, 2019, the Spurs announced Buford will be promoted from general manager to CEO for the Spurs, effective September 3. His previous role will be filled by assistant general manager Brian Wright.

== Personal life ==
His son, Chase, played basketball for the Kansas Jayhawks and was the head coach of the NBL team, the Sydney Kings. He is currently an assistant coach for the Denver Nuggets. His daughter C.C., who played golf for the College of Charleston, now coaches at East Carolina University.

Buford met Bill Self when he served as Self's host during a recruiting visit at Oklahoma State University in 1981. Buford has called Self his best friend.
