= Dylan Harper =

Filipino-American basketball player (born 2006)

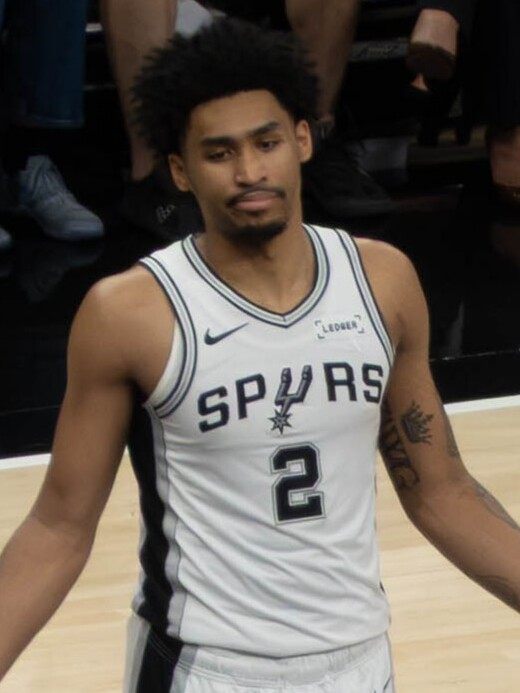
- Harper with the San Antonio Spurs in 2026

No. 2 – San Antonio Spurs
- Position: Point guard / shooting guard
- League: NBA

Personal information
- Born: March 2, 2006 (age 20) Englewood, New Jersey, U.S.
- Listed height: 6 ft 5 in (1.96 m)
- Listed weight: 215 lb (98 kg)

Career information
- High school: Don Bosco Prep (Ramsey, New Jersey)
- College: Rutgers (2024–2025)
- NBA draft: 2025: 1st round, 2nd overall pick
- Drafted by: San Antonio Spurs
- Playing career: 2025–present

Career history
- 2025–present: San Antonio Spurs

Career highlights
- NBA All-Rookie First Team (2026); Third-team All-Big Ten (2025); Big Ten All-Freshman Team (2025); Morgan Wootten National Player of the Year (2024); MaxPreps National Basketball Player of the Year (2024); McDonald's All-American Co-MVP (2024); Jordan Brand Classic MVP (2024)
- Stats at NBA.com
- Stats at Basketball Reference

Dylan Robert Harper (born March 2, 2006) is an American professional basketball player for the San Antonio Spurs of the National Basketball Association (NBA). He played college basketball for the Rutgers Scarlet Knights, and was drafted second overall in the 2025 NBA draft by the Spurs. He was a consensus five-star recruit and one of the top players in the 2024 class. He is the son of former NBA player Ron Harper and the younger brother of Boston Celtics player Ron Harper Jr.

== Early life and high school career ==
Dylan Robert Harper was born on March 2, 2006 in Englewood, New Jersey, at the Englewood Hospital. Harper grew up in Franklin Lakes, New Jersey and attended Don Bosco Preparatory High School. He averaged 15.2 points per game during his sophomore season. Harper was named the Boys Basketball Player of the Year by NJ.com as a junior after averaging 24.9 points, 6.0 rebounds, 3.0 assists, and 2.0 steals per game. Harper averaged 22.4 points, 5.7 rebounds, and 2.7 assists per game while leading the Ironmen to a 29–3 record and a NJSIAA Non-Public A state championship during his senior season. Harper played Amateur Athletic Union (AAU) basketball for the New York Renaissance. He also played in the 2023 USA Basketball Men’s Junior National Team minicamp in Colorado Springs.

=== Recruiting ===
Harper was a consensus five-star recruit and one of the top players in the 2024 class, according to major recruiting services. He was rated the number one overall recruit for the class of 2024 by ESPN during the summer before the start of his senior year. On December 6, 2023, Harper committed to playing college basketball for Rutgers, his brother‘s alma mater, over offers from Duke, Kansas, Indiana, and Auburn. He was the highest-rated recruit in the program's history.

College recruiting
Name	Hometown	School	Height	Weight	Commit date
Dylan Harper; PG / SG	Franklin Lakes, NJ	Don Bosco Prep (NJ)	6 ft 6 in (1.98 m)	210 lb (95 kg)	Dec 6, 2023
Dylan Harper; PG / SG	Recruit ratings: Rivals: 247Sports: On3: ESPN: (96)				
Overall recruit ranking: Rivals: 3 247Sports: 3 On3: 3 ESPN: 4
Note: In many cases, Scout, Rivals, 247Sports, On3, and ESPN may conflict in their listings of height and weight.; In these cases, the average was taken. ESPN grades are on a 100-point scale.; Sources: "Rutgers 2024 Basketball Commitments". Rivals.; "2024 Rutgers Scarlet Knights Recruiting Class". ESPN.; "2024 Team Ranking". Rivals.

== College career ==
As a freshman, Harper averaged 19.4 points, 4.6 rebounds, 4.0 assists and 1.4 steals per game. He was named third-team All-Big Ten and to the all-freshman team. On March 31, 2025, Harper declared for the 2025 NBA draft.

== Professional career ==
=== San Antonio Spurs (2025–present) ===
==== All-Rookie honors and First Finals Appearance (2025–26) ====
Harper was selected with the second overall pick by the San Antonio Spurs in the 2025 NBA draft. Harper was later included in the 2025 NBA Summer League roster of the Spurs. On July 3, 2025, the Spurs announced that they signed Harper. On October 22, Harper made his NBA debut, coming off the bench with fifteen points plus four rebounds and two assists in a 125–92 win over the Dallas Mavericks. On March 21, 2026, Harper scored a then career-high 24 points in a 134–119 win over the Indiana Pacers. After the regular season, Harper was selected to the NBA All-Rookie First Team.

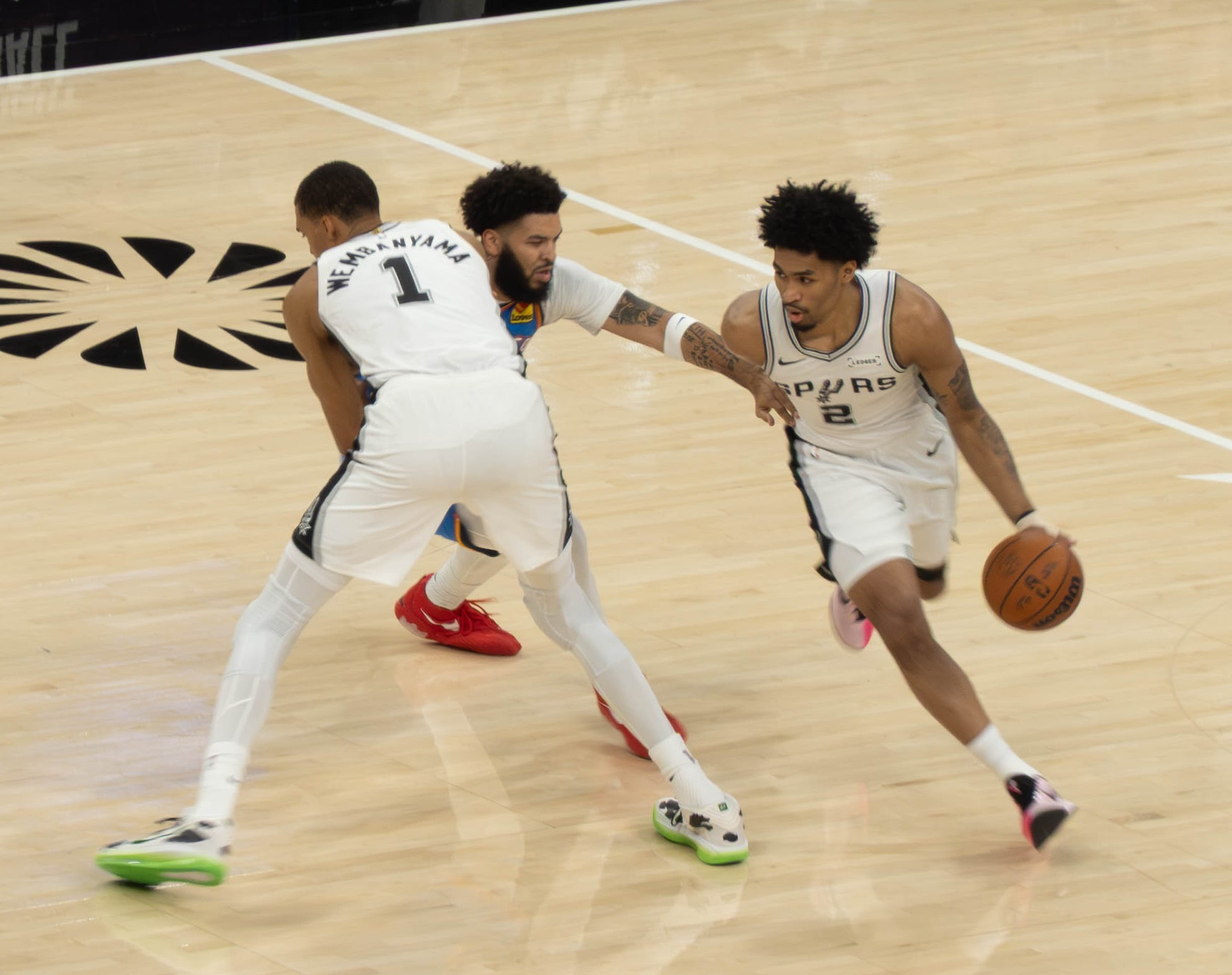
Harper during the 2026 NBA Conference Finals

On April 24, in Game 3 of the Western Conference First Round against the Portland Trail Blazers, Harper put up 27 points and 10 rebounds in a 120–108 win. His teammate Stephon Castle put up 33 points, as they joined Kevin Durant and Russell Westbrook as the only duos to each put up 25 points in the same playoff game at 21 years old or younger in NBA history. He also became the youngest player in NBA history to record at least 20 points and 10 rebounds in a conference finals game. On May 18, in Game 1 of the Western Conference Finals against the Oklahoma City Thunder, Harper recorded 24 points, 11 rebounds, six assists and a franchise playoff-record seven steals in a 122–115 double-overtime victory. In the process, he became only the second rookie in NBA history to record at least 20 points, 10 rebounds, five assists and five steals in a playoff game, joining Magic Johnson.

In Game 5 of the NBA Finals, Harper recorded a team-high 25 points along with five rebounds and four assists without committing a turnover in a 94–90 loss to the Knicks, as the Spurs lost the series 4–1. In his first NBA Finals appearance, Harper averaged 18 points, 6.4 rebounds, and 3 assists per game. Despite appearing in all five games off the bench, he finished as the Spurs' second-leading scorer in the series behind Victor Wembanyama.

==== 2026–27 ====
On November 15, 2026, Harper put up a career-high 31 points, along with nine rebounds, four assists, and one steal in a 110–102 win over the Utah Jazz.

== National team career ==
Harper was named to the United States under-19 basketball team to play in the 2023 FIBA Under-19 Basketball World Cup. He averaged 9.3 points and 4.6 rebounds per game as Team USA finished fourth in the tournament.

== Career statistics ==
Legend
GP	Games played	GS	Games started	MPG	Minutes per game
FG%	Field goal percentage	3P%	3-point field goal percentage	FT%	Free throw percentage
RPG	Rebounds per game	APG	Assists per game	SPG	Steals per game
BPG	Blocks per game	PPG	Points per game	**Bold**	Career high
*	Led the league

=== NBA ===
Year	Team	GP	GS	MPG	FG%	3P%	FT%	RPG	APG	SPG	BPG	PPG
2025–26	San Antonio	69	4	22.6	.505	.343	.756	3.4	3.9	.8	.3	11.8
Career		69	4	22.6	.505	.343	.756	3.4	3.9	.8	.3	11.8

==== Playoffs ====
Year	Team	GP	GS	MPG	FG%	3P%	FT%	RPG	APG	SPG	BPG	PPG
2026	San Antonio	23*	2	26.7	.515	.333	.827	5.6	2.7	1.0	.2	14.1
Career		23	2	26.7	.515	.333	.827	5.6	2.7	1.0	.2	14.1

=== College ===
Year	Team	GP	GS	MPG	FG%	3P%	FT%	RPG	APG	SPG	BPG	PPG
2024–25	Rutgers	29	28	32.6	.484	.333	.750	4.6	4.0	1.4	.6	19.4

== Family ==
Harper's father, Ron Harper, played 15 seasons in the NBA and won five NBA championships. His mother, Maria (née Pizarro), is from Bataan, Philippines, and played college basketball for the University of New Orleans as a freshman in the 1993–94 season. She is a former head coach of the DePaul Catholic High School girls’ varsity team in New Jersey and an assistant coach for the boys' team at Don Bosco High, where she coached Dylan and his brother, Ron Harper Jr. Harper's maternal grandfather represented the Philippines in basque pelota at the 1968 Summer Olympics. Ron Harper Jr. played college basketball at Rutgers and now plays for the Boston Celtics.
