= Stephon Castle =

American basketball player (born 2004)

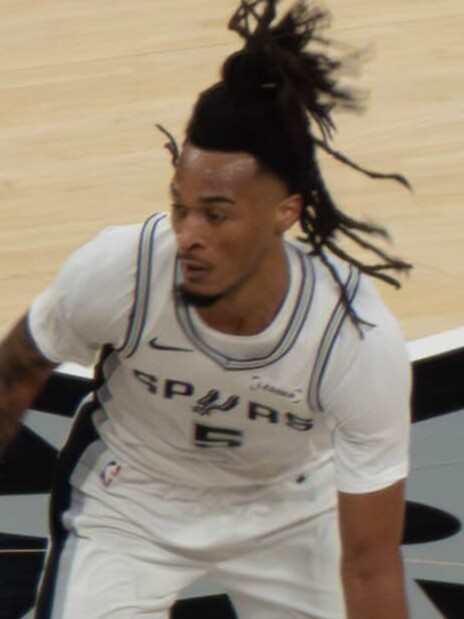
- Castle with the San Antonio Spurs in 2026

No. 5 – San Antonio Spurs
- Position: Point guard / shooting guard
- League: NBA

Personal information
- Born: November 1, 2004 (age 22) Covington, Georgia, U.S.
- Listed height: 6 ft 6 in (1.98 m)
- Listed weight: 215 lb (98 kg)

Career information
- High school: Newton (Covington, Georgia)
- College: UConn (2023–2024)
- NBA draft: 2024: 1st round, 4th overall pick
- Drafted by: San Antonio Spurs
- Playing career: 2024–present

Career history
- 2024–present: San Antonio Spurs

Career highlights
- NBA Rookie of the Year (2025); NBA All-Rookie First Team (2025); NBA Rising Stars Challenge Champion (2026); NCAA champion (2024); Big East Freshman of the Year (2024); Big East All-Freshman team (2024); McDonald's All-American (2023)
- Stats at NBA.com
- Stats at Basketball Reference
Medals
Men's basketball
Representing the United States
FIBA Americas Under-18 Championship
| Gold medal – first place | 2022 Mexico | Team |

Stephon Javonte Castle (/ˈstɛfɒn/ STEF-ahn; born November 1, 2004) is an American professional basketball player for the San Antonio Spurs of the National Basketball Association (NBA). He played college basketball for the UConn Huskies, winning a national championship in 2024. He was a consensus five-star recruit and one of the top players in the 2023 class. Selected fourth overall by the Spurs in the 2024 NBA draft, Castle was named the NBA Rookie of the Year for the 2024–25 season. In 2026, he reached the NBA Finals with the team.

== Early life and high school career ==
Castle grew up in Covington, Georgia, and attended Newton High School. As a sophomore, he helped the Rams reach the 7A state quarterfinals, averaging 13.8 points, 5.2 rebounds, 3.8 assists, and 2.3 steals per game while shooting 41% from 3. He averaged 16.6 points, 6.5 rebounds, and 3.2 assists per game as a junior. He finished his senior year averaging 20.1 points, 9.5 rebounds, 4.8 assists, three steals, and two blocks per game to carry the Rams to the Class 7A state quarterfinals. Castle was selected to play in the 2023 McDonald's All-American Boys Game during his senior year.

=== Recruiting ===
Castle was initially rated a four-star recruit by most recruiting services. On November 19, 2021, he committed to playing college basketball for UConn during his junior year over offers from Auburn, Arkansas, Georgia, Georgia Tech, and Ohio State. By the end of his senior year Castle had been re-rated as a five-star recruit.

== College career ==
Castle enrolled at UConn in June 2023. He helped lead the UConn Huskies to win the 2024 NCAA national championship. He declared for the 2024 NBA draft on April 19, 2024.

== Professional career ==
=== San Antonio Spurs (2024–present) ===
==== Rookie of the Year (2024–2025) ====
On June 26, 2024, Castle was selected with the fourth overall pick by the San Antonio Spurs in the 2024 NBA draft and on July 2, he signed with the Spurs. He made his NBA Summer League debut on July 6, putting up 12 points, six rebounds, and three assists in a 97–65 loss to the Charlotte Hornets.

On February 4, 2025, Castle was named Western Conference Rookie of the Month for January 2025. On February 7, he put up a career-high 33 points in a 117–116 loss to the Charlotte Hornets. At the 2025 NBA All-Star Weekend, Castle was named the most valuable player of the Rising Stars Challenge after leading Team C to the competition's championship. He also participated in the Slam Dunk Contest but lost in the final round to Mac McClung. At the beginning of April, Castle was named Western Conference Rookie of the Month for March 2025. On April 29, he was announced the winner for the NBA Rookie of the Year award. On May 20, Castle was selected to the NBA All-Rookie First Team.

==== First Finals appearance (2025–2026) ====
On November 12, 2025, Castle recorded his first career triple-double with 23 points, 10 rebounds, and 10 assists in the Spurs’ 125–120 loss to the Golden State Warriors. He and Victor Wembanyama became the first pair of teammates in Spurs history to record triple-doubles in the same game. They also became the fifth duo in NBA history to each produce a 20-point triple-double in a game. On February 7, 2026, Castle put up his second career triple-double with a career-high 40 points, alongside 12 rebounds and 12 assists, on 15-of-19 shooting from the field, in a 138–125 win over the Dallas Mavericks. With the performance, he became only the second player in Spurs franchise history after David Robinson to record a 40-point triple-double. On March 12, Castle put up his third career triple-double with 30 points, 11 rebounds, and 10 assists in a 136–131 loss to the Denver Nuggets. On March 28, Castle recorded his fourth career triple-double with 22 points, 10 rebounds, and 10 assists in a 127–95 win over the Milwaukee Bucks.

On April 24, in Game 3 of the Western Conference First Round against the Portland Trail Blazers, Castle put up 33 points and five assists in a 120–108 win. His teammate Dylan Harper put up 27 points, as they joined Kevin Durant and Russell Westbrook as the only duos to each put up 25 points in the same playoff game at 21 years old or younger in NBA history. On June 8, in Game 3 of the NBA Finals, Castle helped the Spurs cut the series deficit to 2–1 by recording 23 points, five rebounds, five assists, one steal, and one block in a 115–111 victory over the New York Knicks, snapping the Knicks’ 13-game winning streak. The Spurs ultimately lost the series 4–1 to the Knicks.

== National team career ==
Castle played for the United States under-18 basketball team at the 2022 FIBA Under-18 Americas Championship. He averaged 5.5 points and 2.2 rebounds per game as the United States won the gold medal.

== Personal life ==
Castle is the son of Quannette and Stacey Castle. He has a younger sister, Staci, and an older brother, Quenton. Castle's father, Stacey, was a teammate of NBA Hall of Famer Tim Duncan at Wake Forest University during the 1993–94 season.

== Career statistics ==
Legend
| GP | Games played | GS | Games started | MPG | Minutes per game |
| FG% | Field goal percentage | 3P% | 3-point field goal percentage | FT% | Free throw percentage |
| RPG | Rebounds per game | APG | Assists per game | SPG | Steals per game |
| BPG | Blocks per game | PPG | Points per game | **Bold** | Career high |
| * | Led the league |

=== NBA ===
==== Regular season ====
| Year | Team | GP | GS | MPG | FG% | 3P% | FT% | RPG | APG | SPG | BPG | PPG |
|---|---|---|---|---|---|---|---|---|---|---|---|---|
| 2024–25 | San Antonio | 81 | 47 | 26.7 | .428 | .285 | .724 | 3.7 | 4.1 | .9 | **.3** | 14.7 |
| 2025–26 | San Antonio | 68 | **67** | **30.0** | **.471** | **.332** | **.734** | **5.3** | **7.4** | **1.1** | **.3** | **16.7** |
| Career | | 149 | 114 | 28.2 | .448 | .305 | .729 | 4.4 | 5.6 | 1.0 | .3 | 15.6 |

==== Playoffs ====
| Year | Team | GP | GS | MPG | FG% | 3P% | FT% | RPG | APG | SPG | BPG | PPG |
|---|---|---|---|---|---|---|---|---|---|---|---|---|
| 2026 | San Antonio | 23* | 23* | 33.0 | .459 | .350 | .816 | 5.0 | 6.1 | .9 | .3 | 18.2 |
| Career | | 23 | 23 | 33.0 | .459 | .350 | .816 | 5.0 | 6.1 | .9 | .3 | 18.2 |

=== College ===
| Year | Team | GP | GS | MPG | FG% | 3P% | FT% | RPG | APG | SPG | BPG | PPG |
|---|---|---|---|---|---|---|---|---|---|---|---|---|
| 2023–24 | UConn | 34 | 30 | 27.0 | .472 | .267 | .755 | 4.7 | 2.9 | .8 | .5 | 11.1 |
