= Harrison Ingram =

American basketball player (born 2002)

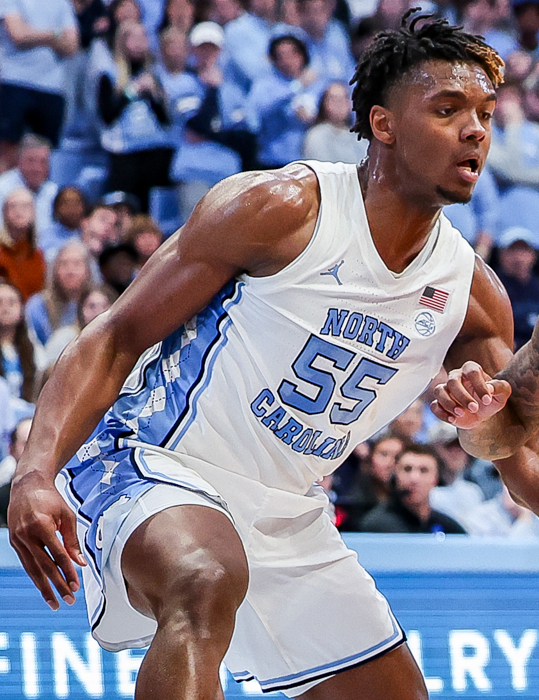
- Ingram with North Carolina in 2024

No. 00 – Utah Jazz
- Position: Small forward / power forward
- League: NBA

Personal information
- Born: November 27, 2002 (age 23) Dallas, Texas, U.S.
- Listed height: 6 ft 5 in (1.96 m)
- Listed weight: 230 lb (104 kg)

Career information
- High school: St. Mark's School (Dallas, Texas)
- College: Stanford (2021–2023); North Carolina (2023–2024)
- NBA draft: 2024: 2nd round, 48th overall pick
- Drafted by: San Antonio Spurs
- Playing career: 2024–present

Career history
- 2024–2026: San Antonio Spurs
- 2024–2026: →Austin Spurs
- 2026–present: Utah Jazz
- 2026–present: →Salt Lake City Stars

Career highlights
- Third-team All-ACC (2024); Pac-12 Freshman of the Year (2022); Pac-12 All-Freshman Team (2022); McDonald's All-American (2021)
- Stats at NBA.com
- Stats at Basketball Reference
Medals
Men's basketball
Representing United States
FIBA Under-19 World Cup
Gold medal – first place	2021 Latvia	Team

Harrison Claiborne Ingram (born November 27, 2002) is an American professional basketball player for the Utah Jazz of the National Basketball Association (NBA), on a two-way contract with the Salt Lake City Stars of the NBA G League. He played college basketball for the Stanford Cardinal and North Carolina Tar Heels. He attended St. Mark's School of Texas in Dallas, Texas and was a consensus five-star recruit coming out of high school.

== High school career ==
Ingram attended St. Mark's School of Texas in Dallas. As a junior, he averaged 19.5 points, 10.9 rebounds and seven assists per game, leading his team to a Southwest Preparatory Conference title. As a senior, Ingram only played seven games, with his team facing multiple COVID-19 pauses, and averaged 22 points, 13 rebounds and 8.4 assists per game. He was named a McDonald's All-American.

Ingram held scholarship offers from several NCAA Division I programs, including Baylor and Kansas, by the time he was a sophomore. A consensus five-star recruit, he committed to playing college basketball for Stanford over offers from Purdue, North Carolina, Michigan, Harvard and Howard.

College recruiting
Name	Hometown	School	Height	Weight	Commit date
Harrison Ingram; SF	Dallas, TX	St. Mark's School (TX)	6 ft 7 in (2.01 m)	210 lb (95 kg)	Sep 18, 2020
Harrison Ingram; SF	Recruit ratings: Rivals: 247Sports: ESPN: (90)				
Overall recruit ranking: Rivals: 15 247Sports: 18 ESPN: 22
Note: In many cases, Scout, Rivals, 247Sports, On3, and ESPN may conflict in their listings of height and weight.; In these cases, the average was taken. ESPN grades are on a 100-point scale.; Sources: "Stanford 2021 Basketball Commitments". Rivals.; "2021 Stanford Cardinal Recruiting Class". ESPN.; "2021 Team Ranking". Rivals.

== College career ==
In his college debut, Ingram scored 16 points and grabbed seven rebounds in a 62–50 win against Tarleton State. On January 11, 2022, he scored 21 points in a 75–69 upset of USC. As a freshman, Ingram averaged 10.5 points, 6.7 rebounds and three assists per game. He was named Pac-12 Freshman of the Year. On March 30, 2022, Ingram declared for the 2022 NBA draft while maintaining his college eligibility. He returned for his sophomore season and started all but one game, averaging 10.5 points and 5.8 rebounds on the campaign.

Following the season, Ingram decided to leave Stanford and put his name into the transfer portal.

Ingram's transfer recruitment came down to North Carolina and Kansas. After an official visit to Chapel Hill, Ingram decided to transfer to the Tar Heels, committing in late April 2023. Before the start of the season, Ingram was named to the Julius Erving Award preseason watchlist. On November 29, 2023, Ingram scored 20 points and 6 rebounds in a 100–92 win over Tennessee in the ACC-SEC Challenge. On January 27, 2024, Ingram scored a double-double of 13 points and 17 rebounds in a 75–68 victory against Florida State. On February 3, 2024, Ingram scored another double-double with 21 points and 13 rebounds in a 93–84 win over rival Duke. On February 5, 2024, Ingram earned Atlantic Coast Conference (ACC) Co-Player of the week honors. At the close of the season, Ingram was named third-team All-ACC. His last collegiate game was in the Sweet 16 versus The University of Alabama. He would lose 89-87 scoring twelve points on 5-12 shooting from the field with 9 rebounds, 5 assists, 2 steals, and a block.

After the conclusion of the season, Ingram declared for the 2024 NBA draft, forgoing his remaining college eligibility.

== Professional career ==
=== San Antonio Spurs (2024–2026) ===
On June 27, 2024, Ingram was selected with the 48th overall pick by the San Antonio Spurs in the 2024 NBA draft and on July 29, he signed a two-way contract with the team. Ingram made his NBA debut on November 6. In his debut, Ingram was substituted in for Sandro Mamukelashvili right under seven minutes left in the 4th quarter and went on to grab one rebound and no other stats as the Spurs fell to the Houston Rockets 100–127. He made five appearances for San Antonio during the 2024–25 NBA season, averaging 0.8 points, 1.8 rebounds, and 0.6 assists.

On August 6, 2025, Ingram re-signed with the Spurs on a two-way contract. He made seven appearances for San Antonio during the regular season, recording averages of 1.6 points, 0.4 rebounds, and 0.1 assists. On July 14, 2026, the Spurs withdrew their qualifying offer to Ingram, making him an unrestricted free agent.

=== Utah Jazz (2026–present) ===
On July 25, 2026, Ingram signed with the Utah Jazz.

== National team career ==
Ingram represented the United States at the 2021 FIBA Under-19 World Cup in Latvia. He averaged 4.6 points and 4.1 rebounds per game, helping his team win the gold medal.

== Career statistics ==
Legend
GP	Games played	GS	Games started	MPG	Minutes per game
FG%	Field goal percentage	3P%	3-point field goal percentage	FT%	Free throw percentage
RPG	Rebounds per game	APG	Assists per game	SPG	Steals per game
BPG	Blocks per game	PPG	Points per game	**Bold**	Career high

=== NBA ===
Year	Team	GP	GS	MPG	FG%	3P%	FT%	RPG	APG	SPG	BPG	PPG
2024–25	San Antonio	5	0	**7.0**	.500	.000	–	**1.8**	**.6**	**.6**	.0	.8
2025–26	San Antonio	**7**	0	3.7	**.833**	**1.000**	–	.4	.1	.0	.0	**1.6**
Career		12	0	5.1	.700	.500	–	1.0	.3	.3	.0	1.3

=== College ===
Year	Team	GP	GS	MPG	FG%	3P%	FT%	RPG	APG	SPG	BPG	PPG
2021–22	Stanford	32	30	31.1	.388	.313	**.663**	6.7	3.0	.9	.3	10.5
2022–23	Stanford	33	32	27.9	.408	.319	.598	5.8	**3.7**	.8	**.5**	10.5
2023–24	North Carolina	**37**	**36**	**32.8**	**.430**	**.385**	.612	**8.8**	2.2	**1.4**	.4	**12.2**
Career		102	98	30.7	.410	.345	.624	7.2	2.9	1.0	.4	11.1

== Personal life ==
Ingram is the son of Vera and Tyrous Ingram. His older brother, Will, played basketball for Middlebury at the NCAA Division III level. His younger sister, Lauren plays volleyball for Duke University. His parents own 17 McDonald's franchise locations in Dallas–Fort Worth. Ingram is also good friends with Ryan Agarwal.

== See also ==
- List of All-Atlantic Coast Conference men's basketball teams
