= Bismack Biyombo =

Congolese basketball player (born 1992)

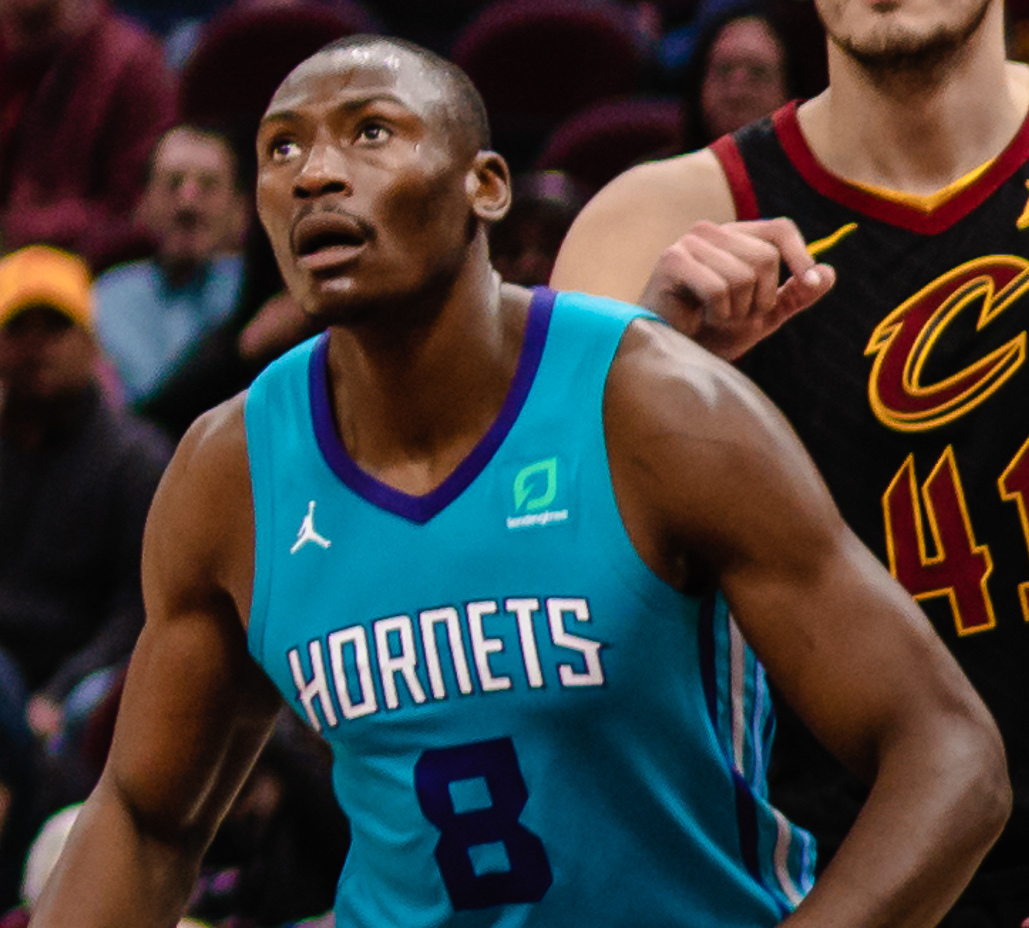
- Biyombo with the Charlotte Hornets in 2019

Free agent
- Position: Center

Personal information
- Born: August 28, 1992 (age 34) Lubumbashi, Zaire (now the Democratic Republic of the Congo)
- Listed height: 6 ft 8 in (2.03 m)
- Listed weight: 255 lb (116 kg)

Career information
- NBA draft: 2011: 1st round, 7th overall pick
- Drafted by: Sacramento Kings
- Playing career: 2009–present

Career history
- 2009: Fuenlabrada-Getafe Madrid
- 2009–2011: CB Illescas
- 2011: Baloncesto Fuenlabrada
- 2011–2015: Charlotte Bobcats / Hornets
- 2015–2016: Toronto Raptors
- 2016–2018: Orlando Magic
- 2018–2021: Charlotte Hornets
- 2022–2023: Phoenix Suns
- 2023–2024: Memphis Grizzlies
- 2024: Oklahoma City Thunder
- 2025–2026: San Antonio Spurs
- Stats at NBA.com
- Stats at Basketball Reference

Bismack Biyombo Sumba (born August 28, 1992) is a Congolese professional basketball player who last played for the San Antonio Spurs of the National Basketball Association (NBA). He was selected seventh overall in the 2011 NBA draft by the Sacramento Kings and subsequently traded to the Charlotte Bobcats.

Biyombo played four seasons for the Bobcats (rebranded to the Hornets in 2014) before signing with the Toronto Raptors in the 2015 off-season, with whom he reached the Eastern Conference Finals in 2016. He then signed with the Orlando Magic in the 2016 off-season and played two seasons with the team before being traded back to the Hornets in the 2018 off-season.

After three seasons during his second stint in Charlotte, Biyombo signed with the Phoenix Suns in January 2022 and spent two seasons with the team. He then played for the Memphis Grizzlies and Oklahoma City Thunder during the 2023–24 season before joining the Spurs in February 2025. With San Antonio, he reached the 2026 NBA Finals.

== Early life and career ==
Biyombo was born in Lubumbashi, Zaire (now the Democratic Republic of Congo), to parents François and Françoise Biyombo. He has three brothers named Billy, Biska and Bikim, and three sisters named Bimeline, Bikelene and Bimela.

At age 16, he played for Lupopo in the 2008 FIBA Africa Clubs Champions Cup, Africa's premier senior league at the time. That year he was discovered by coach Mário Palma at a youth tournament in Yemen. His play impressed Palma and earned him an opportunity to train in Spain.

Biyombo started the 2009–10 season with Fuenlabrada-Getafe in the Spanish fourth-tier Liga EBA before moving to CB Illescas in the Spanish third-tier LEB Plata. He started the 2010–11 season with CB Illescas before moving to Baloncesto Fuenlabrada of the first-tier Liga ACB in January 2011.

== Professional career ==
=== Fuenlabrada (2011) ===
Biyombo made his debut at age 18 in the Spanish ACB League with Fuenlabrada against DKV Joventut on January 9, 2011, recording 5 points and 7 rebounds in just over 13 minutes of play. In Fuenlabrada's narrow defeat to Real Madrid, he recorded 6 points and 3 blocks, one of them against former Spanish League MVP and Spanish national team player, Felipe Reyes.

At the 2011 Nike Hoops Summit, Biyombo participated for the World Select Team (against the USA Select Team), and recorded a triple double, with 12 points, 11 rebounds, and 10 blocks. It was the first recorded triple-double in the Summit's history.

=== Charlotte Bobcats / Hornets (2011–2015) ===
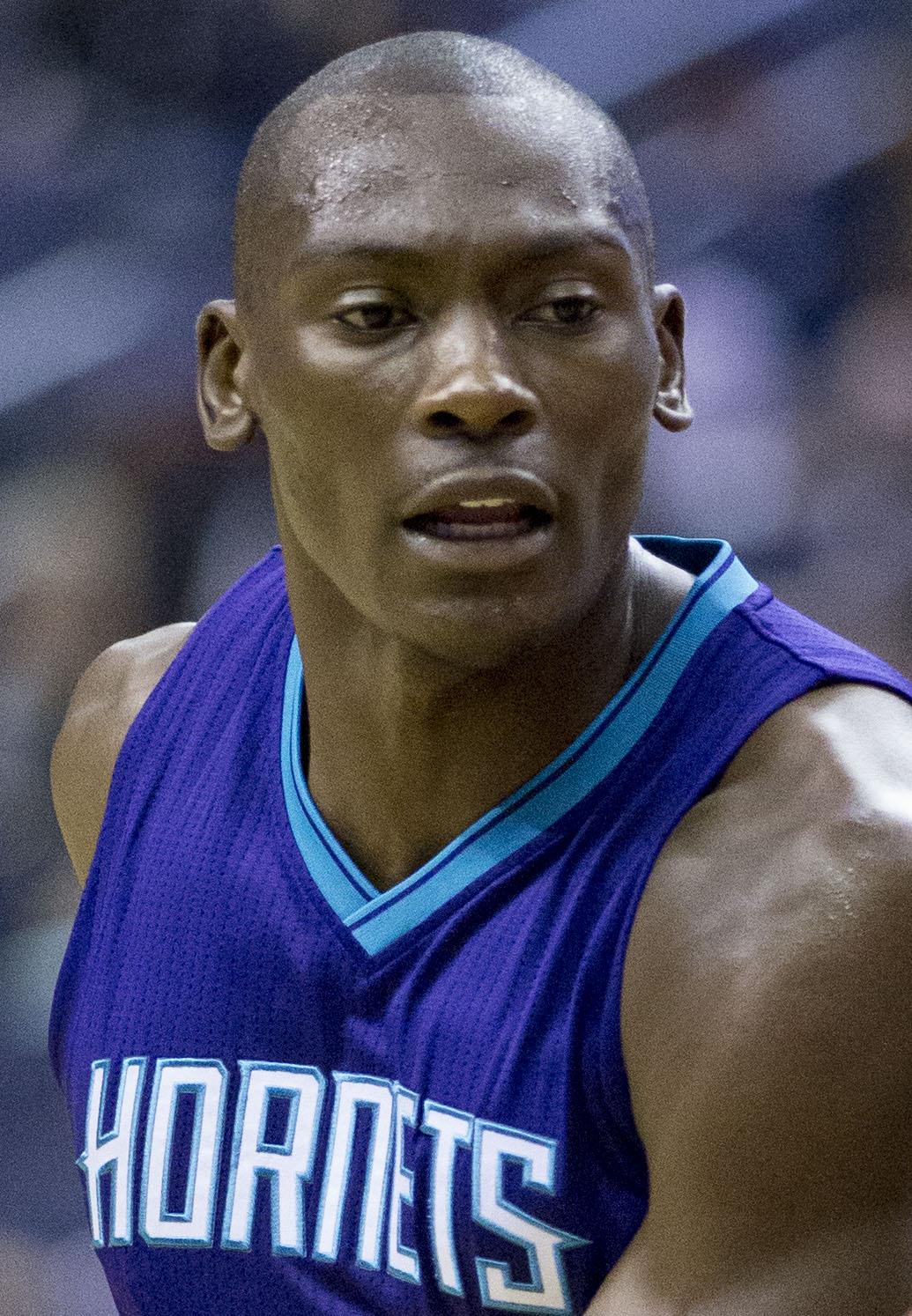
Biyombo with the Charlotte Hornets in 2014

Biyombo was drafted seventh overall by the Sacramento Kings in the 2011 NBA draft, but his rights were later traded to the Charlotte Bobcats in a draft night trade. On December 19, 2011, Biyombo signed a multi-year deal with the Bobcats. After averaging five points per game over his first two seasons with Charlotte, Biyombo's minutes and subsequent production dropped dramatically in 2013–14 as he fell out of favor with coach Steve Clifford, as he averaged just 2.9 points in 13.9 minutes per game.

The Bobcats changed their name to the Hornets ahead of the 2014-15 season. While his forte in defense and rebounding did drop in 2013–14, Biyombo began the 2014–15 season in much better form despite missing seven out of the first eight games of the season largely due to the acquisition of Jason Maxiell in the 2014 off-season. With the late-December injury to center Al Jefferson, Biyombo was placed into the starting line-up. On June 30, 2015, the Hornets decided not to extend a qualifying offer to Biyombo, making him an unrestricted free agent.

=== Toronto Raptors (2015–2016) ===
On July 18, 2015, Biyombo signed a two-year, $5.7 million contract with the Toronto Raptors. On August 1, 2015, he played for Team Africa at the 2015 NBA Africa exhibition game. He made his debut for the Raptors in the team's season opener against the Indiana Pacers on October 28, recording 7 points and 5 rebounds in a 106–99 win. Biyombo started in 18 straight games between mid-November and late December while Jonas Valančiūnas was recovering from a fractured hand. On December 17, he recorded 8 points, a then career-high 18 rebounds, and a career-high tying 7 blocks in a loss to the Charlotte Hornets. Five days later, he recorded 9 points and a then career-high 20 rebounds in a 103–99 win over the Dallas Mavericks. Biyombo returned to a bench role on December 30. He returned to the starting line-up in mid-March with Valančiūnas out injured again. On March 17, 2016, Biyombo scored a career-high 16 points and set a franchise record with 25 rebounds in guiding the Raptors to a 101–94 overtime win over the Indiana Pacers. On March 30, he recorded seven points and six rebounds in a 105–97 win over the Atlanta Hawks, helping the Raptors record a 50-win season for the first time in franchise history.

The Raptors finished the regular season as the second seed in the Eastern Conference with a 56–26 record. In the first round of the playoffs, the Raptors faced the seventh-seeded Indiana Pacers, and in a Game 5 win on April 26, Biyombo recorded 10 points and 16 rebounds off the bench to help the Raptors take a 3–2 series lead. The Raptors went on to win the series 4–3, moving on to the second round where they faced the Miami Heat. In Game 7 of the Raptors' series with the Heat, Biyombo recorded 17 points and 16 rebounds as a starter in a 116–89 win, helping the Raptors advance to the conference finals for the first time in franchise history. In Game 3 of the conference finals against the Cleveland Cavaliers, Biyombo set a Toronto playoff record with 26 rebounds, helping the Raptors cut the Cavaliers' advantage in the series to 2–1. The Raptors went on to lose the series in six games.

After declining his $2.9 million player option for the 2016–17 season, Biyombo became an unrestricted free agent on June 7, 2016. Biyombo later revealed that he wished to re-sign with the Raptors, but with the re-signing of DeMar DeRozan, the Raptors did not have the salary cap space to make it possible.

=== Orlando Magic (2016–2018) ===
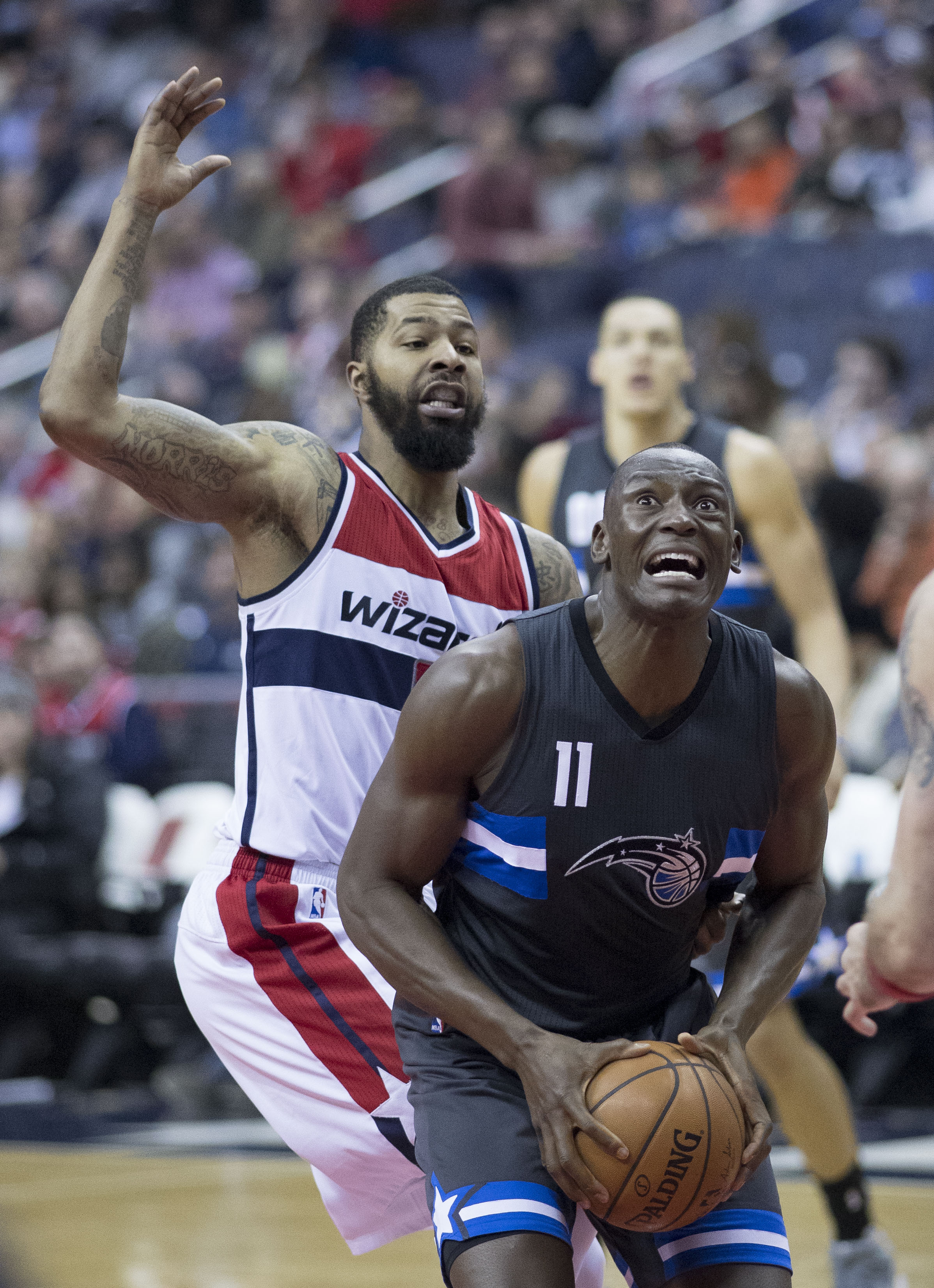
Biyombo (right) with the Orlando Magic in 2017, defended by Markieff Morris

On July 7, 2016, Biyombo signed a four-year, $72 million contract with the Orlando Magic. After exceeding the flagrant foul limit during the 2016 playoffs, Biyombo was forced to serve an NBA-mandated one-game suspension to begin the 2016–17 season. He made his debut for the Magic in the team's second game of the season on October 28, scoring two points in just under 23 minutes in a 108–82 loss to the Detroit Pistons. On January 16, 2017, he scored a season-high 15 points against the Denver Nuggets. He tied that mark on February 11, scoring 15 points against the Dallas Mavericks. On March 5, he grabbed a season-high 15 rebounds against the Washington Wizards.

On January 1, 2018, Biyombo recorded 13 points and a season-high 17 rebounds in a 98–95 loss to the Brooklyn Nets. On January 12, he scored a career-high 21 points in a 125–119 loss to the Washington Wizards. On April 4, he had 12 points, 12 rebounds and a career-high five assists in a 105–100 win over the Dallas Mavericks.

=== Return to Charlotte (2018–2021) ===
On July 7, 2018, Biyombo was traded back to the Charlotte Hornets in a three-team deal. On January 5, 2019, he scored a season-high 16 points in a 123–110 loss to the Denver Nuggets.

On November 27, 2019, Biyombo recorded a season-high 19 points along with 9 rebounds and two blocks in a 102–101 win against the Detroit Pistons. On December 16, 2019, he logged a season-high 17 rebounds along with 11 points and a block against the Indiana Pacers.

Biyombo re-signed with the Hornets on November 30, 2020. On February 5, 2021, he scored a season-high 13 points, along with four rebounds and one assist in 19 minutes against the Utah Jazz. On April 13, he recorded a double-double of 10 points and 12 rebounds against the Los Angeles Lakers. On May 1, he had a season-high five blocks off the bench against the Detroit Pistons. Biyombo again scored 13 points on May 13, where he also recorded seven rebounds and one assist against the Los Angeles Clippers.

=== Phoenix Suns (2022–2023) ===
Biyombo became an unrestricted free agent after the 2020–21 season. He did not sign with any team throughout 2021 in part due to him grieving for the passing of his father, François. On January 1, 2022, he signed a 10-day contract with the Phoenix Suns via the COVID-19 hardship exemption. On January 11, Biyombo signed for the rest of the season after showing off some very positive production during his 10-day contract. On January 17, Biyombo had 17 points and 14 rebounds. Five days later, on January 22, Biyombo recorded 21 points, 13 rebounds, and 5 assists coming off the bench. From January 26–30, Biyombo became a starter once again due to injuries to Deandre Ayton and JaVale McGee. In the 17 games Biyombo played from January to February 12, the Suns were undefeated.

On July 5, 2022, the Suns re-signed Biyombo.

=== Memphis Grizzlies (2023–2024) ===
On November 1, 2023, Biyombo signed with the Memphis Grizzlies, but was waived on January 10, 2024.

=== Oklahoma City Thunder (2024) ===
On February 10, 2024, Biyombo signed with the Oklahoma City Thunder. On March 6, Biyombo unexpectedly collapsed to the floor on his team's sideline during a game against the Portland Trail Blazers. He was eventually able to leave the court under his own power and was cleared of any serious medical condition.

=== San Antonio Spurs (2025–2026) ===
On February 9, 2025, Biyombo signed a 10-day contract with the San Antonio Spurs. On February 21, Biyombo and the Spurs agreed to another 10-day contract. On March 3, the Spurs signed him to a contract for the remainder of the season. In 28 appearances (26 starts) for San Antonio, Biyombo averaged 5.1 points, 5.6 rebounds, and 1.1 assists.

On September 15, 2025, Biyombo re-signed with the Spurs on a one-year contract.

== Personal life ==
Biyombo is Catholic. He enjoys reading in his spare time and speaks five languages: English, French, Lingala, Spanish and Swahili. Biyombo is eligible to play for the DR Congo men's national basketball team, but never played for the team, despite his intentions to do so in November 2018.

After fainting during an NBA game in 2024 due to dehydration, Biyombo revealed that he has been fasting regularly for 13 seasons as a personal devotion to his Catholic faith.

Biyombo started the Bismack Biyombo Foundation in 2016. During the COVID-19 pandemic in 2020, the foundation donated around $1 million worth of medical supplies to people in the Democratic Republic of the Congo. In March 2022, Biyombo announced that he had pledged his salary from the entire 2021–22 season towards the construction of a hospital in Congo, in honor of his father.

== Career statistics ==
Legend
GP	Games played	GS	Games started	MPG	Minutes per game
FG%	Field goal percentage	3P%	3-point field goal percentage	FT%	Free throw percentage
RPG	Rebounds per game	APG	Assists per game	SPG	Steals per game
BPG	Blocks per game	PPG	Points per game	**Bold**	Career high
*	Led the league

=== NBA ===
==== Regular season ====
Year	Team	GP	GS	MPG	FG%	3P%	FT%	RPG	APG	SPG	BPG	PPG
2011–12	Charlotte	63	41	23.1	.464	—	.483	5.8	.4	.3	**1.8**	5.2
2012–13	Charlotte	80	**65**	**27.3**	.451	—	.521	7.3	.4	.4	**1.8**	4.8
2013–14	Charlotte	77	9	13.9	**.611**	—	.517	4.8	.1	.1	1.1	2.9
2014–15	Charlotte	64	21	19.4	.543	—	.583	6.4	.3	.3	1.5	4.8
2015–16	Toronto	**82***	22	22.0	.542	.000	.628	**8.0**	.4	.2	1.6	5.5
2016–17	Orlando	81	27	22.1	.526	—	.534	7.0	.9	.3	1.1	6.0
2017–18	Orlando	**82***	25	18.2	.520	.000	.534	5.7	.8	.3	1.2	5.7
2018–19	Charlotte	54	32	14.5	.571	—	.637	4.6	.6	.2	.8	4.4
2019–20	Charlotte	53	29	19.4	.543	—	.603	5.8	.9	.2	.9	**7.4**
2020–21	Charlotte	66	36	20.4	.587	.000	.448	5.3	1.2	.3	1.1	5.0
2021–22	Phoenix	36	3	14.1	.593	—	.535	4.6	.6	.3	.7	5.8
2022–23	Phoenix	61	14	14.3	.578	—	.357	4.3	.9	.3	1.4	4.3
2023–24	Memphis	30	27	23.9	.563	—	.478	6.4	**1.7**	.3	1.1	5.2
2023–24	Oklahoma City	10	0	7.3	.583	—	.500	1.8	.2	.1	.3	1.8
2024–25	San Antonio	28	26	18.9	.588	—	.570	5.6	1.1	.6	.8	5.1
2025–26	San Antonio	25	1	5.6	.600	—	**.714**	1.0	.2	.2	.1	.9
Career		892	378	19.1	.537	.000	.552	5.8	.7	.3	1.2	5.0

==== Playoffs ====
Year	Team	GP	GS	MPG	FG%	3P%	FT%	RPG	APG	SPG	BPG	PPG
2014	Charlotte	3	1	16.0	.600	—	.333	3.7	.3	.0	.7	2.7
2016	Toronto	**20**	**10**	**25.3**	.580	—	**.597**	**9.4**	.4	**.4**	**1.4**	**6.2**
2022	Phoenix	9	0	9.5	**.647**	—	.500	2.1	.6	.1	.2	2.8
2023	Phoenix	8	0	9.8	.563	—	.500	3.4	**.8**	.0	1.3	3.4
2026	San Antonio	9	0	2.8	.429	—	—	.3	.0	.0	.2	.7
Career		49	11	15.2	.579	—	.559	5.0	.4	.2	.9	3.9
