= Devin Vassell =

American basketball player (born 2000)

- Vassell with the San Antonio Spurs in 2026

No. 24 – San Antonio Spurs
- Position: Shooting guard / small forward
- League: NBA

Personal information
- Born: August 23, 2000 (age 26) Lawrenceville, Georgia, U.S.
- Listed height: 6 ft 5 in (1.96 m)
- Listed weight: 200 lb (91 kg)

Career information
- High school: Peachtree Ridge (Suwanee, Georgia)
- College: Florida State (2018–2020)
- NBA draft: 2020: 1st round, 11th overall pick
- Drafted by: San Antonio Spurs
- Playing career: 2020–present

Career history
- 2020–present: San Antonio Spurs

Career highlights
- Second-team All-ACC (2020)
- Stats at NBA.com
- Stats at Basketball Reference

Devin Anthony Vassell (/vəˈsɛl/ və-SEL; born August 23, 2000) is an American professional basketball player for the San Antonio Spurs of the National Basketball Association (NBA). He played college basketball for the Florida State Seminoles.

== Early life ==
Vassell grew up in Suwanee, Georgia and attended Peachtree Ridge High School. As a senior, Vassell averaged 21.6 points and 8.9 rebounds per game and was named the regional Player of the Year by the Gwinnett Daily Post. Vassell committed to play college basketball at Florida State over offers from Texas Tech, North Florida and Stetson.

== College career ==
As a true freshman, Vassell averaged 4.5 points and 1.5 rebounds per game and led all ACC freshman with a .419 three-point shooting percentage. He scored a season-high 16 points on December 17, 2018, in a win over Southeast Missouri State. Vassell made a three-pointer with 4.5 seconds left in regulation to force overtime in the Seminoles' 65–63 win over Virginia Tech in the quarterfinals of the 2019 ACC men's basketball tournament.

He was named a starter for the Seminoles' going into his sophomore season. Vassell was named the Most Outstanding Player of the 2019 Emerald Coast Classic after scoring 16 points against Chicago State, 13 against 17th-ranked Tennessee and 13 points against Purdue in the final. Midway through the season Vassell's play lead him to be considered as a potential first round pick in the 2020 NBA draft. He scored a career-high 18 points against Virginia in a 54–50 victory and set a new career high the next game with 23 points and 11 rebounds against Miami and was named the ACC co-Player of the Week. Vassell surpassed his previous career high with 27 points while going 7-for-7 on three-point shots against Virginia Tech on February 1, 2020. Vassell missed a game against Syracuse for undisclosed reasons on February 15. At the conclusion of the regular season, Vassell was selected to the Second Team All-ACC. He led the team in scoring with 12.7 points per game and in rebounding with 5.1 per game and was second on the team in blocks (29), assists (49) and steals (42). Following the end of the season, Vassell announced that he would enter the 2020 NBA draft.

== Professional career ==
Vassell was selected by the San Antonio Spurs with the 11th overall pick in the 2020 NBA draft. On November 27, he signed with the Spurs. Vassell made his NBA debut on December 23, recording three points and three rebounds in a 131–119 win over the Memphis Grizzlies. On April 17, 2021, Vassell scored a season-high 18 points, alongside three rebounds, two assists and two blocks, in a 111–85 win over the Phoenix Suns.

On February 26, 2022, Vassell scored a regular season-high 22 points, alongside five rebounds and four assists, in a 129–133 loss to the Miami Heat. On April 1, Vassell again scored 22 points, alongside four rebounds and three assists, in a 130–111 win over the Portland Trail Blazers. Despite a season-high 23 points, alongside two rebounds and three assists, from Vassell, the Spurs were defeated by the New Orleans Pelicans in the play-in tournament with a 103–113 loss. The loss eliminated the Spurs from a chance to get a spot in the playoffs.

On November 4, 2022, Vassell scored a then career-high 29 points, alongside two rebounds and two assists, in a 106–113 loss to the Los Angeles Clippers. On November 17, he again scored 29 points, alongside three rebounds and three assists, in a 112–130 loss to the Sacramento Kings. Vassell underwent an arthroscopic procedure on his left knee on January 11, 2023 and made his return on March 2, 2023, in a victory against the Indiana Pacers. On March 19, 2023, he yet again scored 29 points.

On October 2, 2023, Vassell and the Spurs agreed to a five–year, $146 million contract extension. The contract signed by Vassell was the largest contract in Spurs franchise history. On December 15, 2023, Vassell scored a then career-high 36 points, alongside six rebounds and three assists, in a 129–115 win against the Los Angeles Lakers. On November 27, 2024, in a 119–101 loss to the Lakers, he became the first Spurs player to make 450 3-pointers in their first 250 career games. Vassell recorded a career-high 37 points in a win against the Nets on March 4, 2025.

== Career statistics ==
Legend
GP	Games played	GS	Games started	MPG	Minutes per game
FG%	Field goal percentage	3P%	3-point field goal percentage	FT%	Free throw percentage
RPG	Rebounds per game	APG	Assists per game	SPG	Steals per game
BPG	Blocks per game	PPG	Points per game	**Bold**	Career high
*	Led the league

=== NBA ===
==== Regular season ====
Year	Team	GP	GS	MPG	FG%	3P%	FT%	RPG	APG	SPG	BPG	PPG
2020–21	San Antonio	62	7	17.0	.406	.347	**.843**	2.8	.9	.7	.3	5.5
2021–22	San Antonio	**71**	32	27.3	.427	.361	.838	**4.3**	1.9	1.1	**.6**	12.3
2022–23	San Antonio	38	32	31.0	.439	**.387**	.780	3.9	3.6	1.1	.4	18.5
2023–24	San Antonio	68	62	**33.1**	**.472**	.372	.801	3.8	**4.1**	1.1	.3	**19.5**
2024–25	San Antonio	64	53	31.0	.443	.368	.792	4.0	2.9	**1.3**	.5	16.3
2025–26	San Antonio	67	**65**	30.5	.437	.384	.815	4.0	2.5	.9	.4	13.9
Career		370	251	28.2	.443	.372	.807	3.8	2.6	1.0	.4	14.1

==== Playoffs ====
Year	Team	GP	GS	MPG	FG%	3P%	FT%	RPG	APG	SPG	BPG	PPG
2026	San Antonio	23*	23*	34.8	.432	.378	.821	5.3	2.7	1.7	.7	13.0
Career		23	23	34.8	.432	.378	.821	5.3	2.7	1.7	.7	13.0

=== College ===
Year	Team	GP	GS	MPG	FG%	3P%	FT%	RPG	APG	SPG	BPG	PPG
2018–19	Florida State	**33**	0	10.7	.437	**.419**	.679	1.5	.6	.5	.3	4.5
2019–20	Florida State	30	**30**	**28.8**	**.490**	.415	**.738**	**5.1**	**1.6**	**1.4**	**1.0**	**12.7**
Career		63	30	19.3	.475	.417	.720	3.2	1.1	1.0	.6	8.4

== Personal life ==
Vassell's father, Andrew Vassell, played college basketball at Stony Brook and is of Jamaican descent, hailing from Runaway Bay.

== See also ==
- List of All-Atlantic Coast Conference men's basketball teams
