= Brian Wright (basketball) =

American basketball executive and sports agent

San Antonio Spurs
- Position: General manager
- League: NBA

Personal information
- Born: Silver Spring, Maryland, U.S.

Career history
- 2019–present: San Antonio Spurs

Brian Wright (born 1983) has been the general manager of the San Antonio Spurs since August 2019.

Wright is a contributor to two books: '100 Heroes: People in Sports Who Make This a Better World' and '150 Heroes'.

He and his wife, Cara, have two children.

== Early life and career ==
Wright, born to Jamaican parents, is the youngest of three siblings. He was raised in Silver Spring, Maryland.

A 5-foot-9 guard, he played Division III basketball at La Sierra University in Riverside, California for which he was inducted into the Riverside Sports Hall of Fame for his exceptional play during the 2003 and 2004 seasons.

Wright attended graduate school at UCF College of Business to earn a master's degree in sport business management (MSBM) from the DeVos Sport Business Management program in 2007.

Wright worked for the National Consortium for Academics and Sports (2006–07) under Richard Lapchick, the Orlando Magic (2006–14) for eight years, moving up the ranks from summer intern to player development and college scouting manager, and then to the Detroit Pistons (2014–16) for two years as an assistant general manager.

== San Antonio Spurs ==
In August 2016, Wright became the assistant general manager of San Antonio Spurs, stepping into the position previously held by current GM Brooklyn Nets GM Sean Marks and long-time GM Scott Layden. In the summer of 2019, Wright was the key player in the re-signing of Rudy Gay, and arranging the trade that steered DeMarre Carroll to San Antonio.

R.C. Buford, long-time GM, was promoted to CEO in 2019. In July 2019, San Antonio Spurs announced the promotion of Wright to general manager.

Wright and the Spurs organization selected Devin Vassell with the 11th pick in the 2020 NBA draft, their highest draft pick since Tim Duncan in 1997. They then drafted Tre Jones with the 41st pick. Following the draft picks, Wright said “The league has really changed, where you really looked at guys as one-position players, and you’re either a one, a two, a three, a four, or a five. What you see now is you’ve got guards, you’ve got wings and you’ve got bigs...You want guys that are versatile and can play multiple positions, and I think with Devin for sure he can play across multiple positions, and as he gets stronger, he’ll be able to do that even more...He’ll be able to play one through four in a few years”

On March 29, 2021, Wright spearheaded the signing of Gorgui Dieng and waived Marquese Chriss.

== See also ==
- List of NBA general managers

Sporting positions
Preceded by R. C. Buford	San Antonio Spurs General Manager; 2019–present	Incumbent
