= 2023–24 San Antonio Spurs season =

- Head coach: Gregg Popovich
- President: Gregg Popovich; Brent Barry (vice)
- General manager: Brian Wright
- Owner: Peter Holt
- Arena: Frost Bank Center (Note: Formerly known as the AT&T Center until September 22, 2023.)

Results
- Record: 22–60 (.268)
- Place: Division: 5th (Southwest); Conference: 14th (Western)
- Playoff finish: Did not qualify
- Stats at Basketball Reference

Local media
- Television: Bally Sports Southwest, KENS, KMYS; KNIC (Spanish)
- Radio: 1200 WOAI

The 2023–24 San Antonio Spurs season was the 57th season of the franchise, its 48th in the National Basketball Association (NBA), and its 51st in the San Antonio area. After finishing with the third-worst record in 2022–23, the Spurs won the 2023 NBA Draft Lottery, selecting French center Victor Wembanyama as their third #1 pick in franchise history after previously selecting Tim Duncan in 1997 and David Robinson in 1987.

After starting the season 3–2, the Spurs lost 18 consecutive games between November 5 and December 15, the longest losing streak in franchise history. Despite Wembanyama's best efforts, not only did they fail to improve upon their record from the previous year, but were eliminated from playoff contention for the fifth consecutive season after a loss to the Sacramento Kings on March 7.

The San Antonio Spurs drew an average home attendance of 18,110 in 41 home games in the 2023–24 NBA season.

== Draft ==
Round	Pick	Player	Position	Nationality	School/club team
1	1	Victor Wembanyama	C	France	Metropolitans 92 (France)
2	33	Leonard Miller	SF	Canada	NBA G League Ignite (NBA G League)
2	44	Sidy Cissoko	SG/SF	France	NBA G League Ignite (NBA G League)

The Spurs held a first-round pick and two second-round picks entering the draft. As expected by many draft experts and pundits, the Spurs would select 7'4" French center Victor Wembanyama of the Metropolitans 92 as their third ever #1 pick in franchise history. In the second round, however, the Spurs would select two NBA G League Ignite players by taking Canadian small forward Leonard Miller at #33 and French guard/forward Sidy Cissoko at #44.

== Roster ==
2023–24 San Antonio Spurs roster
Players

Pos.	No.	Player	Height	Weight	DOB	From
F	26	Dominick Barlow	6 ft 9 in (2.06 m)	215 lb (98 kg)	2003-05-26	Dumont HS (NJ)
F/C	28	Charles Bassey (injured)	6 ft 10 in (2.08 m)	230 lb (104 kg)	2000-10-28	Western Kentucky
G	15	Jamaree Bouyea (TW)	6 ft 2 in (1.88 m)	180 lb (82 kg)	1999-06-27	San Francisco
F	22	Malaki Branham	6 ft 4 in (1.93 m)	180 lb (82 kg)	2003-05-12	Ohio State
F	30	Julian Champagnie	6 ft 7 in (2.01 m)	217 lb (98 kg)	2001-06-29	St. John's
G/F	25	Sidy Cissoko	6 ft 6 in (1.98 m)	219 lb (99 kg)	2004-04-02	France
F/C	23	Zach Collins	6 ft 11 in (2.11 m)	250 lb (113 kg)	1997-11-19	Gonzaga
G	7	David Jr. Duke (TW)	6 ft 4 in (1.93 m)	204 lb (93 kg)	1999-10-13	Providence
G	4	Devonte' Graham	6 ft 1 in (1.85 m)	195 lb (88 kg)	1995-02-22	Kansas
F	41	RaiQuan Gray (TW)	6 ft 7 in (2.01 m)	269 lb (122 kg)	1999-07-07	Florida State
G/F	3	Keldon Johnson	6 ft 5 in (1.96 m)	220 lb (100 kg)	1999-10-11	Kentucky
G	33	Tre Jones	6 ft 1 in (1.85 m)	185 lb (84 kg)	2000-01-08	Duke
F/C	54	Sandro Mamukelashvili	6 ft 10 in (2.08 m)	240 lb (109 kg)	1999-05-23	Seton Hall
F	16	Cedi Osman	6 ft 7 in (2.01 m)	230 lb (104 kg)	1995-04-08	Turkey
F	10	Jeremy Sochan	6 ft 8 in (2.03 m)	230 lb (104 kg)	2003-05-20	Baylor
G/F	24	Devin Vassell	6 ft 5 in (1.96 m)	200 lb (91 kg)	2000-08-23	Florida State
F/C	1	Victor Wembanyama	7 ft 4 in (2.24 m)	210 lb (95 kg)	2004-01-04	France
G	14	Blake Wesley	6 ft 4 in (1.93 m)	185 lb (84 kg)	2003-03-16	Notre Dame

Coaches
Head coach
- Gregg Popovich
Assistant(s)
- Brett Brown
- Mitch Johnson
- Matthew Nielsen
- Darius Songaila

Legend
- (DP) Unsigned draft pick
- (FA) Free agent
- (S) Suspended
- (GL) On assignment to G League affiliate
- (TW) Two-way affiliate player
- Injured

Roster
Updated: December 5, 2024

== Standings ==
=== Division ===
Southwest Division	W	L	PCT	GB	Home	Road	Div	GP
y – Dallas Mavericks	50	32	.610	–	25‍–‍16	25‍–‍16	11‍–‍5	82
x – New Orleans Pelicans	49	33	.598	1.0	21‍–‍19	28‍–‍14	9‍–‍7	82
Houston Rockets	41	41	.500	9.0	27‍–‍14	14‍–‍27	9‍–‍7	82
Memphis Grizzlies	27	55	.329	23.0	9‍–‍32	18‍–‍23	8‍–‍8	82
San Antonio Spurs	22	60	.268	28.0	12‍–‍29	10‍–‍31	3‍–‍13	82

=== Conference ===
Western Conference
#	Team	W	L	PCT	GB	GP
1	c – Oklahoma City Thunder *	57	25	.695	–	82
2	x – Denver Nuggets	57	25	.695	–	82
3	x – Minnesota Timberwolves	56	26	.683	1.0	82
4	y – Los Angeles Clippers *	51	31	.622	6.0	82
5	y – Dallas Mavericks *	50	32	.610	7.0	82
6	x – Phoenix Suns	49	33	.598	8.0	82
7	x – New Orleans Pelicans	49	33	.598	8.0	82
8	x – Los Angeles Lakers	47	35	.573	10.0	82
9	pi – Sacramento Kings	46	36	.561	11.0	82
10	pi – Golden State Warriors	46	36	.561	11.0	82
11	Houston Rockets	41	41	.500	16.0	82
12	Utah Jazz	31	51	.378	26.0	82
13	Memphis Grizzlies	27	55	.329	30.0	82
14	San Antonio Spurs	22	60	.268	35.0	82
15	Portland Trail Blazers	21	61	.256	36.0	82

== Game log ==
=== Preseason ===
2023 preseason game log
Total: 3–2 (Home: 2–1; Road: 1–1)
Preseason: 3–2 (home: 2–1; road: 1–1)

Game	Date	Team	Score	High points	High rebounds	High assists	Location Attendance	Record
1	October 9	@ Oklahoma City	L 121–122	Victor Wembanyama (20)	Charles Bassey (12)	Tre Jones (6)	Paycom Center	0–1
2	October 13	Miami	W 120–104	Victor Wembanyama (23)	Bassey, Sochan (6)	Jones, Osman (5)	Frost Bank Center; 17,412	1–1
3	October 16	Houston	L 89–99	Zach Collins (18)	Zach Collins (8)	Zach Collins (5)	Frost Bank Center; 16,030	1–2
4	October 18	Houston	W 117–103	Devin Vassell (25)	Zach Collins (9)	Zach Collins (5)	Frost Bank Center; 17,236	2–2
5	October 20	@ Golden State	W 122–117	Victor Wembanyama (19)	Jeremy Sochan (11)	Tre Jones (8)	Chase Center	3–2

2023–24 preseason schedule

=== Regular season ===
2023–24 game log
Total: 22–60 (Home: 12–29; Road: 10–31)
October: 2–2 (home: 1–1; road: 1–1)

Game	Date	Team	Score	High points	High rebounds	High assists	Location Attendance	Record
1	October 25	Dallas	L 119–126	Devin Vassell (23)	Keldon Johnson (9)	Keldon Johnson (7)	Frost Bank Center; 18,947	0–1
2	October 27	Houston	W 126–122 (OT)	Devin Vassell (25)	Victor Wembanyama (12)	Collins, Jones (8)	Frost Bank Center; 18,354	1–1
3	October 29	@ L.A. Clippers	L 83–123	Devin Vassell (14)	Zach Collins (6)	Collins, Jones (4)	Crypto.com Arena; 19,370	1–2
4	October 31	@ Phoenix	W 115–114	Keldon Johnson (27)	Victor Wembanyama (8)	Sochan, Vassell (5)	Footprint Center; 17,071	2–2

November: 1–13 (home: 0–8; road: 1–5)

Game	Date	Team	Score	High points	High rebounds	High assists	Location Attendance	Record
5	November 2	@ Phoenix	W 132–121	Victor Wembanyama (38)	Victor Wembanyama (10)	Tre Jones (10)	Footprint Center; 17,071	3–2
6	November 5	Toronto	L 116–123	Keldon Johnson (26)	Zach Collins (11)	Tre Jones (6)	Frost Bank Center; 18,354	3–3
7	November 6	@ Indiana	L 111–152	Doug McDermott (17)	Victor Wembanyama (10)	Tre Jones (8)	Gainbridge Fieldhouse; 15,129	3–4
8	November 8	@ New York	L 105–126	Jeremy Sochan (16)	Victor Wembanyama (9)	Keldon Johnson (8)	Madison Square Garden; 19,812	3–5
9	November 10	Minnesota	L 110–117	Vassell, Wembanyama (29)	Victor Wembanyama (9)	Collins, Sochan (5)	Frost Bank Center; 18,354	3–6
10	November 12	Miami	L 113–118	Keldon Johnson (20)	Keldon Johnson (12)	Branham, Wembanyama (7)	Frost Bank Center; 18,036	3–7
11	November 14	@ Oklahoma City	L 87–123	Champagnie, Collins (13)	Victor Wembanyama (14)	Devonte' Graham (7)	Paycom Center; 18,203	3–8
12	November 17	Sacramento	L 120–129	Zach Collins (28)	Johnson, Wembanyama (9)	Keldon Johnson (7)	Frost Bank Center; 18,354	3–9
13	November 18	Memphis	L 108–120	Keldon Johnson (22)	Victor Wembanyama (13)	Zach Collins (6)	Frost Bank Center; 18,354	3–10
14	November 20	L.A. Clippers	L 99–124	Keldon Johnson (22)	Charles Bassey (12)	Johnson, Jones (5)	Frost Bank Center; 18,354	3–11
15	November 22	L.A. Clippers	L 102–109	Victor Wembanyama (22)	Victor Wembanyama (15)	Jeremy Sochan (7)	Frost Bank Center; 18,354	3–12
16	November 24	@ Golden State	L 112–118	Devin Vassell (24)	Keldon Johnson (12)	Zach Collins (6)	Chase Center; 18,064	3–13
17	November 26	@ Denver	L 120–132	Victor Wembanyama (22)	Victor Wembanyama (11)	Tre Jones (6)	Ball Arena; 19,665	3–14
18	November 30	Atlanta	L 135–137	Jeremy Sochan (33)	Victor Wembanyama (12)	Jones, Collins (7)	Frost Bank Center; 17,646	3–15

December: 2–12 (home: 1–5; road: 1–7)

Game	Date	Team	Score	High points	High rebounds	High assists	Location Attendance	Record
19	December 1	@ New Orleans	L 106–121	Devin Vassell (14)	Charles Bassey (11)	Cedi Osman (5)	Smoothie King Center; 17,028	3–16
20	December 6	@ Minnesota	L 94–102	Devin Vassell (22)	Johnson, Wembanyama (10)	Cedi Osman (6)	Target Center; 18,024	3–17
21	December 8	Chicago	L 112–121	Victor Wembanyama (21)	Victor Wembanyama (20)	Tre Jones (8)	Frost Bank Center; 18,074	3–18
22	December 11	@ Houston	L 82–93	Victor Wembanyama (15)	Victor Wembanyama (18)	Malaki Branham (7)	Toyota Center; 16,481	3–19
23	December 13	L.A. Lakers	L 119–122	Victor Wembanyama (30)	Victor Wembanyama (13)	Keldon Johnson (8)	Frost Bank Center; 18,354	3–20
24	December 15	L.A. Lakers	W 129–115	Devin Vassell (36)	Victor Wembanyama (15)	Malaki Branham (8)	Frost Bank Center; 18,354	4–20
25	December 17	New Orleans	L 110–146	Victor Wembanyama (17)	Victor Wembanyama (13)	Tre Jones (5)	Frost Bank Center; 18,354	4–21
26	December 19	@ Milwaukee	L 119–132	Keldon Johnson (28)	Keldon Johnson (12)	Jeremy Sochan (8)	Fiserv Forum; 17,729	4–22
27	December 21	@ Chicago	L 95–114	Devin Vassell (21)	Zach Collins (9)	Victor Wembanyama (5)	United Center; 20,697	4–23
28	December 23	@ Dallas	L 119–144	Jeremy Sochan (23)	Jeremy Sochan (9)	Devin Vassell (5)	American Airlines Center; 20,409	4–24
29	December 26	Utah	L 118–130	Keldon Johnson (26)	Victor Wembanyama (7)	Tre Jones (7)	Frost Bank Center; 18,579	4–25
30	December 28	@ Portland	W 118–105	Victor Wembanyama (30)	Sochan, Collins (7)	Devin Vassell (7)	Moda Center; 19,335	5–25
31	December 29	@ Portland	L 128–134	Keldon Johnson (29)	Tre Jones (8)	Keldon Johnson (7)	Moda Center; 18,861	5–26
32	December 31	Boston	L 101–134	Devin Vassell (22)	Mamukelashvili, Wembanyama (7)	Blake Wesley (6)	Frost Bank Center; 18,886	5–27

January: 5–11 (home: 3–5; road: 2–6)

Game	Date	Team	Score	High points	High rebounds	High assists	Location Attendance	Record
33	January 2	@ Memphis	L 98–106	Victor Wembanyama (20)	Barlow, Wembanyama (7)	Johnson, Jones (4)	FedExForum; 17,794	5–28
34	January 4	Milwaukee	L 121–125	Devin Vassell (34)	Keldon Johnson (10)	Tre Jones (6)	Frost Bank Center; 19,082	5–29
35	January 7	@ Cleveland	L 115–117	Victor Wembanyama (24)	Victor Wembanyama (10)	Tre Jones (5)	Rocket Mortgage FieldHouse; 19,432	5–30
36	January 10	@ Detroit	W 130–108	Keldon Johnson (17)	Victor Wembanyama (12)	Victor Wembanyama (10)	Little Caesars Arena; 17,833	6–30
37	January 12	Charlotte	W 135–99	Victor Wembanyama (26)	Victor Wembanyama (11)	Tre Jones (7)	Frost Bank Center; 18,073	7–30
38	January 13	Chicago	L 116–125	Tre Jones (30)	Tre Jones (9)	Keldon Johnson (5)	Frost Bank Center; 18,354	7–31
39	January 15	@ Atlanta	L 99–109	Victor Wembanyama (26)	Victor Wembanyama (13)	Tre Jones (12)	State Farm Arena; 17,447	7–32
40	January 17	@ Boston	L 98–117	Victor Wembanyama (27)	Jeremy Sochan (7)	Tre Jones (11)	TD Garden; 19,156	7–33
41	January 19	@ Charlotte	L 120–124	Keldon Johnson (25)	Jeremy Sochan (8)	Jeremy Sochan (8)	Spectrum Center; 19,093	7–34
42	January 20	@ Washington	W 131–127	Victor Wembanyama (24)	Keldon Johnson (9)	Tre Jones (12)	Capital One Arena; 17,922	8–34
43	January 22	@ Philadelphia	L 123–133	Victor Wembanyama (33)	Jeremy Sochan (8)	Devin Vassell (9)	Wells Fargo Center; 20,511	8–35
44	January 24	Oklahoma City	L 114–140	Victor Wembanyama (24)	Victor Wembanyama (12)	Devin Vassell (7)	Frost Bank Center; 18,130	8–36
45	January 26	Portland	W 116–100	Jeremy Sochan (31)	Keldon Johnson (16)	Blake Wesley (8)	Frost Bank Center; 17,274	9–36
46	January 27	Minnesota	W 113–112	Devin Vassell (25)	Victor Wembanyama (10)	Tre Jones (11)	Frost Bank Center; 17,726	10–36
47	January 29	Washington	L 113–118	Devin Vassell (24)	Victor Wembanyama (11)	Tre Jones (8)	Frost Bank Center; 17,020	10–37
48	January 31	Orlando	L 98–108	Devin Vassell (26)	Jeremy Sochan (12)	Tre Jones (8)	Frost Bank Center; 17,081	10–38

February: 2–10 (home: 1–2; road: 1–8)

Game	Date	Team	Score	High points	High rebounds	High assists	Location Attendance	Record
49	February 2	New Orleans	L 113–114	Devin Vassell (28)	Jeremy Sochan (16)	Jones, Wembanyama (7)	Frost Bank Center; 17,207	10–39
50	February 3	Cleveland	L 101–117	Devin Vassell (22)	Victor Wembanyama (14)	Tre Jones (8)	Frost Bank Center; 18,354	10–40
51	February 7	@ Miami	L 104–116	Jones, Vassell (19)	Victor Wembanyama (13)	Jones, Wesley (6)	Kaseya Center; 19,652	10–41
52	February 8	@ Orlando	L 111–127	Devin Vassell (30)	Champagnie, Vassell (5)	Blake Wesley (7)	Kia Center; 19,074	10–42
53	February 10	@ Brooklyn	L 103–123	Victor Wembanyama (21)	Dominick Barlow (9)	Devin Vassell (4)	Barclays Center; 18,005	10–43
54	February 12	@ Toronto	W 122–99	Victor Wembanyama (27)	Victor Wembanyama (14)	Tre Jones (10)	Scotiabank Arena; 19,800	11–43
55	February 14	@ Dallas	L 93–116	Victor Wembanyama (26)	Zach Collins (12)	Vassell, Wesley (6)	American Airlines Center; 20,311	11–44
All-Star Game
56	February 22	@ Sacramento	L 122–127	Devin Vassell (32)	Victor Wembanyama (13)	Tre Jones (9)	Golden 1 Center; 18,153	11–45
57	February 23	@ L.A. Lakers	L 118–123	Victor Wembanyama (27)	Jeremy Sochan (13)	Victor Wembanyama (8)	Crypto.com Arena; 18,997	11–46
58	February 25	@ Utah	L 109–128	Devin Vassell (27)	Victor Wembanyama (10)	Tre Jones (9)	Delta Center; 18,206	11–47
59	February 27	@ Minnesota	L 105–114	Devin Vassell (21)	Victor Wembanyama (13)	Jones, Vassell (6)	Target Center; 18,024	11–48
60	February 29	Oklahoma City	W 133–118	Wembanyama, Vassell (28)	Victor Wembanyama (13)	Devin Vassell (9)	Frost Bank Center; 18,392	12–48

March: 6–9 (home: 4–7; road: 2–2)

Game	Date	Team	Score	High points	High rebounds	High assists	Location Attendance	Record
61	March 3	Indiana	W 117–105	Victor Wembanyama (31)	Victor Wembanyama (12)	Wembanyama, Branham (6)	Frost Bank Center; 18,027	13–48
62	March 5	@ Houston	L 101–114	Devin Vassell (22)	Victor Wembanyama (11)	Jones, Wesley (5)	Toyota Center; 16,734	13–49
63	March 7	@ Sacramento	L 129–131	Devin Vassell (30)	Jeremy Sochan (8)	Tre Jones (12)	Golden 1 Center; 17,968	13–50
64	March 9	@ Golden State	W 126–113	Keldon Johnson (22)	Keldon Johnson (11)	Tre Jones (11)	Chase Center; 18,064	14–50
65	March 11	Golden State	L 102–112	Victor Wembanyama (27)	Victor Wembanyama (14)	Sochan, Jones (7)	Frost Bank Center; 18,354	14–51
66	March 12	Houston	L 101–103	Tre Jones (24)	Victor Wembanyama (10)	Vassell, Wembanyama (6)	Frost Bank Center; 18,751	14–52
67	March 15	Denver	L 106–117	Jeremy Sochan (19)	Victor Wembanyama (9)	Tre Jones (9)	Moody Center; 16,223	14–53
68	March 17	Brooklyn	W 122–115 (OT)	Victor Wembanyama (33)	Victor Wembanyama (15)	Devin Vassell (8)	Moody Center; 16,057	15–53
69	March 19	Dallas	L 107–113	Tre Jones (22)	Victor Wembanyama (11)	Tre Jones (9)	Frost Bank Center; 18,354	15–54
70	March 22	Memphis	L 97–99	Victor Wembanyama (31)	Victor Wembanyama (16)	Jones, Wembanyama (5)	Frost Bank Center; 17,408	15–55
71	March 23	Phoenix	L 106–131	Keldon Johnson (14)	Victor Wembanyama (5)	Tre Jones (5)	Frost Bank Center; 18,354	15–56
72	March 25	Phoenix	W 104–102	Sochan, Vassell (26)	Jeremy Sochan (18)	Devin Vassell (7)	Frost Bank Center; 18,044	16–56
73	March 27	@ Utah	W 118–111	Devin Vassell (31)	Jeremy Sochan (9)	Tre Jones (9)	Delta Center; 18,206	17–56
74	March 29	New York	W 130–126 (OT)	Victor Wembanyama (40)	Victor Wembanyama (20)	Wembanyama, Vassell (7)	Frost Bank Center; 18,604	18–56
75	March 31	Golden State	L 113–117	Victor Wembanyama (32)	Sandro Mamukelashvili (11)	Tre Jones (6)	Frost Bank Center; 18,718	18–57

April: 4–3 (home: 2–1; road: 2–2)

Game	Date	Team	Score	High points	High rebounds	High assists	Location Attendance	Record
76	April 2	@ Denver	L 105–110	Malaki Branham (24)	Victor Wembanyama (15)	Tre Jones (11)	Ball Arena; 19,741	18–58
77	April 5	@ New Orleans	W 111–109	Devonte' Graham (20)	Victor Wembanyama (12)	Victor Wembanyama (9)	Smoothie King Center; 17,422	19–58
78	April 7	Philadelphia	L 126–133 (2OT)	Victor Wembanyama (33)	Victor Wembanyama (18)	Tre Jones (9)	Frost Bank Center; 18,718	19–59
79	April 9	@ Memphis	W 102–87	Victor Wembanyama (18)	Sandro Mamukelashvili (16)	Victor Wembanyama (6)	FedExForum; 16,108	20–59
80	April 10	@ Oklahoma City	L 89–127	Zach Collins (20)	Sandro Mamukelashvili (11)	Tre Jones (7)	Paycom Center; 17,229	20–60
81	April 12	Denver	W 121–120	Victor Wembanyama (34)	Mamukelashvili, Wembanyama (12)	Tre Jones (10)	Frost Bank Center; 18,665	21–60
82	April 14	Detroit	W 123–95	Sandro Mamukelashvili (18)	Zach Collins (9)	Champagnie, Jones (6)	Frost Bank Center; 18,516	22–60

2023–24 season schedule

=== In-Season Tournament ===
This was the first regular season where all the NBA teams competed in a mid-season tournament setting due to the implementation of the 2023 NBA In-Season Tournament. During the in-season tournament period, the Spurs competed in Group C of the Western Conference, which included the Sacramento Kings, Golden State Warriors, Minnesota Timberwolves, and Oklahoma City Thunder.

==== West group C ====
Pos	Team	Pld	W	L	PF	PA	PD	Qualification	SAC	MIN	GSW	OKC	SAS
1	Sacramento Kings	4	4	0	482	452	+30	Advance to knockout stage	—	124–111	124–123	105–98	129–120
2	Minnesota Timberwolves	4	3	1	438	438	0		111–124	—	104–101	106–103	117–110
3	Golden State Warriors	4	2	2	483	479	+4		123–124	101–104	—	141–139	118–112
4	Oklahoma City Thunder	4	1	3	463	439	+24		98–105	103–106	139–141	—	123–87
5	San Antonio Spurs	4	0	4	429	487	−58		120–129	110–117	112–118	87–123	—

Source: NBA
Rules for classification: Tiebreakers

== Player statistics ==
Legend
GP	Games played	GS	Games started	MPG	Minutes per game
FG%	Field-goal percentage	3P%	3-point field-goal percentage	FT%	Free-throw percentage
RPG	Rebounds per game	APG	Assists per game	SPG	Steals per game
BPG	Blocks per game	PPG	Points per game

=== Regular season ===
San Antonio Spurs statistics
Player	GP	GS	MPG	FG%	3P%	FT%	RPG	APG	SPG	BPG	PPG
Dominick Barlow	33	1	12.7	.496	.333	.690	3.4	1.1	.4	.4	4.4
Charles Bassey	19	0	10.8	.725	.000	.833	4.0	1.1	.4	.9	3.3
Jamaree Bouyea^{†}	3	0	12.7	.714	1.000		3.0	1.0	.3	.0	3.7
Malaki Branham	75	29	21.3	.432	.347	.873	2.0	2.1	.4	.1	9.2
Julian Champagnie	74	59	19.8	.408	.365	.815	2.8	1.4	.6	.6	6.8
Sidy Cissoko	12	0	11.8	.485	.083	.800	1.8	.8	.6	.3	3.8
Zach Collins	69	29	22.1	.484	.320	.753	5.4	2.8	.5	.8	11.2
Mamadi Diakite^{†}	3	0	5.3	.800		.667	1.0	.7	.0	.3	4.0
David Duke Jr.	4	0	12.8	.556	.500	1.000	2.5	1.3	.5	.0	6.5
Devonte' Graham	23	0	13.6	.352	.301	.813	1.6	2.1	.4	.1	5.0
RaiQuan Gray	3	0	13.0	.588	.429		2.3	2.0	.3	.3	7.7
Keldon Johnson	69	27	29.5	.454	.346	.792	5.5	2.8	.7	.3	15.7
Tre Jones	77	48	27.8	.505	.335	.856	3.8	6.2	1.0	.1	10.0
Sandro Mamukelashvili	46	5	9.8	.471	.297	.735	3.2	1.1	.2	.3	4.1
Doug McDermott^{†}	46	0	15.2	.442	.439	.588	1.0	1.2	.2	.0	6.0
Cedi Osman	72	3	17.6	.479	.389	.673	2.5	1.7	.5	.2	6.8
Jeremy Sochan	74	73	29.6	.438	.308	.771	6.4	3.4	.8	.5	11.6
Devin Vassell	68	62	33.1	.472	.372	.801	3.8	4.1	1.1	.3	19.5
Victor Wembanyama	71	71	29.7	.465	.325	.796	10.6	3.9	1.2	3.6	21.4
Blake Wesley	61	3	14.4	.474	.218	.667	1.5	2.7	.5	.1	4.4

- ^{†} Denotes player spent time with another team in the season. Stats reflect time with the Spurs only.

== Transactions ==
=== Trades ===
June 23, 2023	To San Antonio Spurs 2026 UTA second-round pick 2028 MIN second-round pick	To Minnesota Timberwolves Draft rights to Leonard Miller (No. 33)
July 6, 2023	Three-team trade	
July 6, 2023	To San Antonio Spurs Cedi Osman (from Cleveland); Lamar Stevens (from Cleveland); 2026 second-round pick (from Miami) (Note: Least favorable of OKC, DAL, or PHI); 2030 CLE second-round pick Cash considerations (from Cleveland)	To Cleveland Cavaliers Max Strus (from Miami)
July 6, 2023	To Miami Heat 2026 LAL second-round pick (from Cleveland); 2027 second-round pick (from San Antonio) (Note: Least favorable of SAS, HOU, IND, MIA, or OKC)	
July 12, 2023	Three-team trade	
July 12, 2023	To San Antonio Spurs Reggie Bullock (from Dallas); 2030 DAL unprotected first-round pick swap	To Boston Celtics 2024 second-round pick (from San Antonio) (Note: More favorable of NOP or CHI); 2025 DAL second-round pick swap 2030 DAL second-round pick
July 12, 2023	To Dallas Mavericks Grant Williams (from Boston); 2025 TOR second-round pick (from San Antonio); 2028 MIA second-round pick (from San Antonio)	
July 17, 2023	To San Antonio Spurs Cameron Payne; 2025 NOP second-round pick Cash considerations	To Phoenix Suns 2024 SAS second-round pick (Note: Protected 31-49 and 55-59)

=== Free agency ===
==== Re-signed ====
Player	Signed	Ref.
Julian Champagnie	July 6, 2023	
Tre Jones	July 18, 2023	
Dominick Barlow	July 27, 2023 (Two-way contract)	
Sandro Mamukelashvili	July 27, 2023	

==== Additions ====
Player	Signed	Former Team	Ref.
Sir'Jabari Rice	July 5, 2023 (Two-way contract)	Texas Longhorns	
Setric Millner Jr.	September 15, 2023 (Two-way contract)	Toledo Rockets	

==== Subtractions ====
Player	Reason	New Team	Ref.
Keita Bates-Diop	Free agency	Phoenix Suns	
Lamar Stevens	Waived	Boston Celtics	
Cameron Payne	Waived	Milwaukee Bucks	
