= 2022 NBA draft =

76th edition of the draft

General information
- Sport: Basketball
- Date: June 23, 2022
- Location: Barclays Center (Brooklyn, New York)
- Networks: ESPN; ABC (first round only)

Overview
- 58 total selections in 2 rounds
- League: NBA
- First selection: Paolo Banchero (Orlando Magic)

The 2022 NBA draft (branded as the 2022 NBA Draft presented by State Farm for sponsorship reasons), the 76th edition of the National Basketball Association's annual draft, was held on June 23, 2022, at Barclays Center in Brooklyn, New York. The 2022 edition marked a return to the draft's normal June date after postponements were made in 2020 and 2021 due to the COVID-19 pandemic. This draft was the first of at least three straight NBA drafts that consisted of only 58 picks instead of the typical 60 due to the loss of a second-round pick for both the Milwaukee Bucks and the Miami Heat for violating the NBA's tampering rules during free agency. The first pick was made by the Orlando Magic, who selected Paolo Banchero from Duke. Banchero went on to win Rookie of the Year.

== Draft selections ==
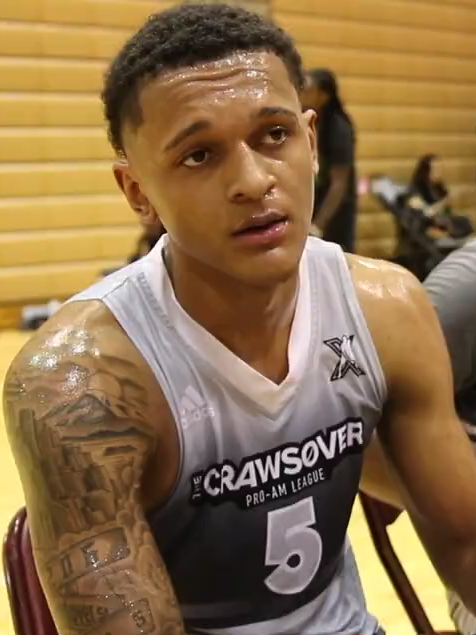
Paolo Banchero was selected 1st overall by the Orlando Magic and voted the Rookie of the Year.

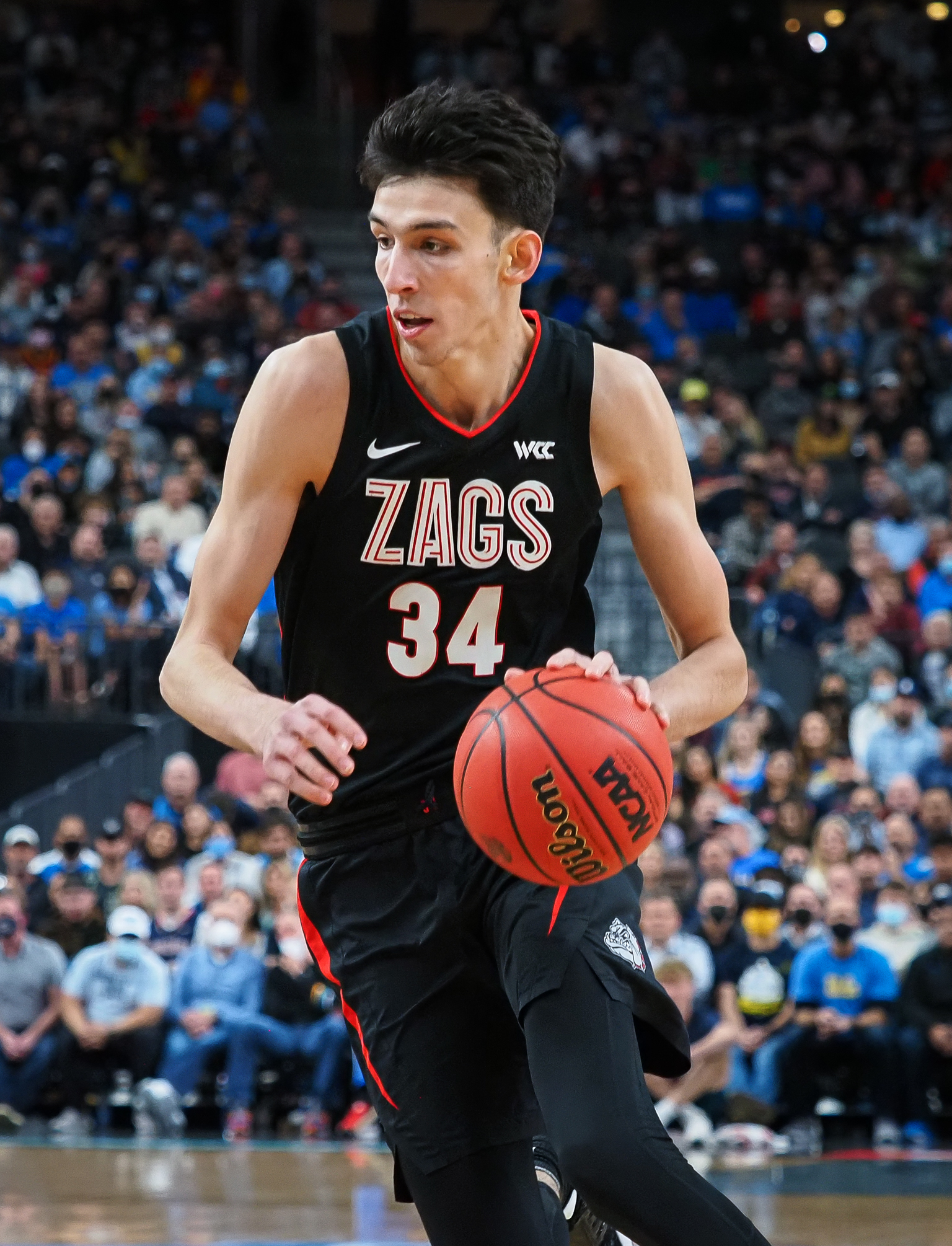
Chet Holmgren was selected 2nd overall by the Oklahoma City Thunder.

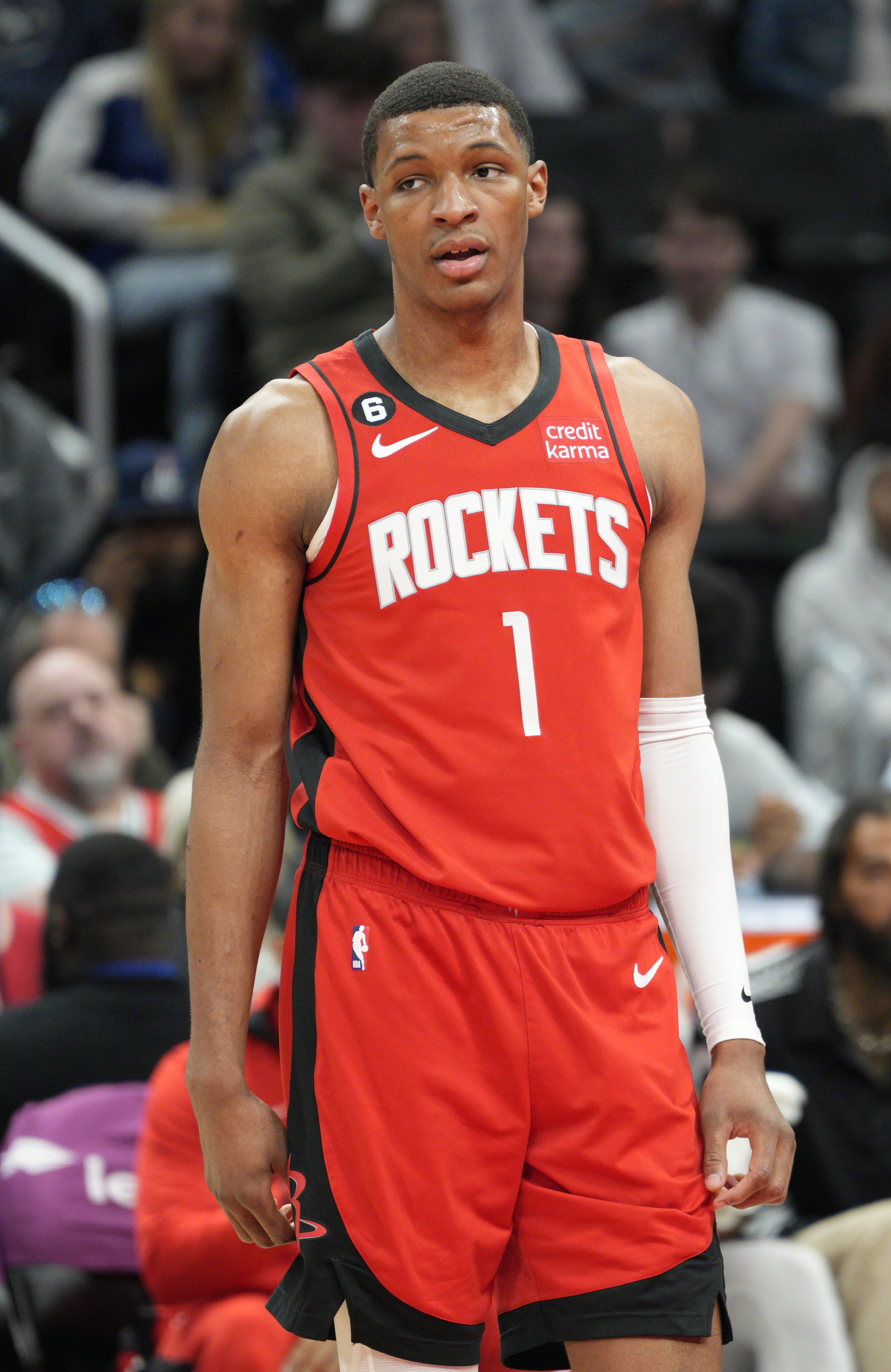
Jabari Smith Jr. was selected 3rd overall by the Houston Rockets.

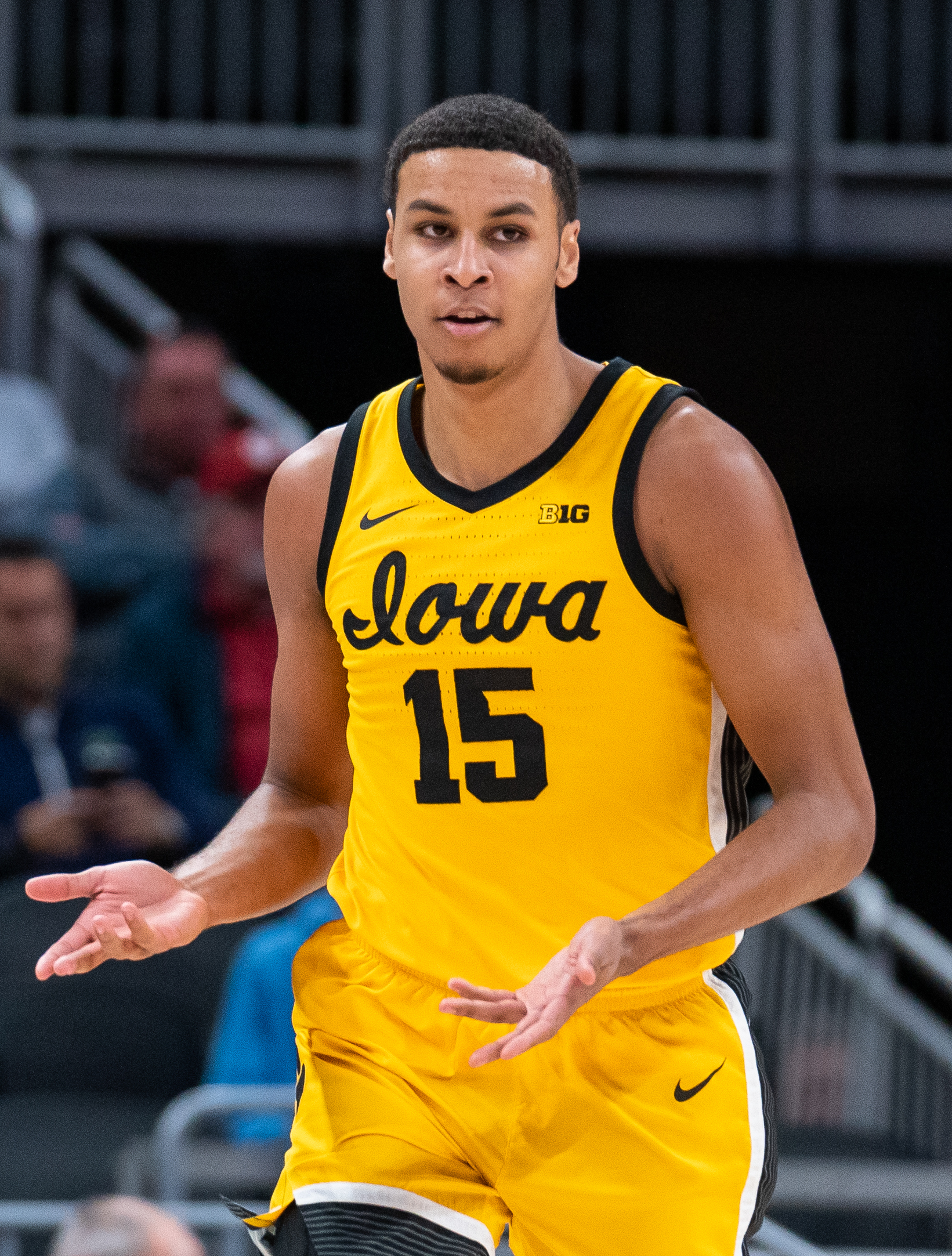
Keegan Murray was selected 4th overall by the Sacramento Kings.

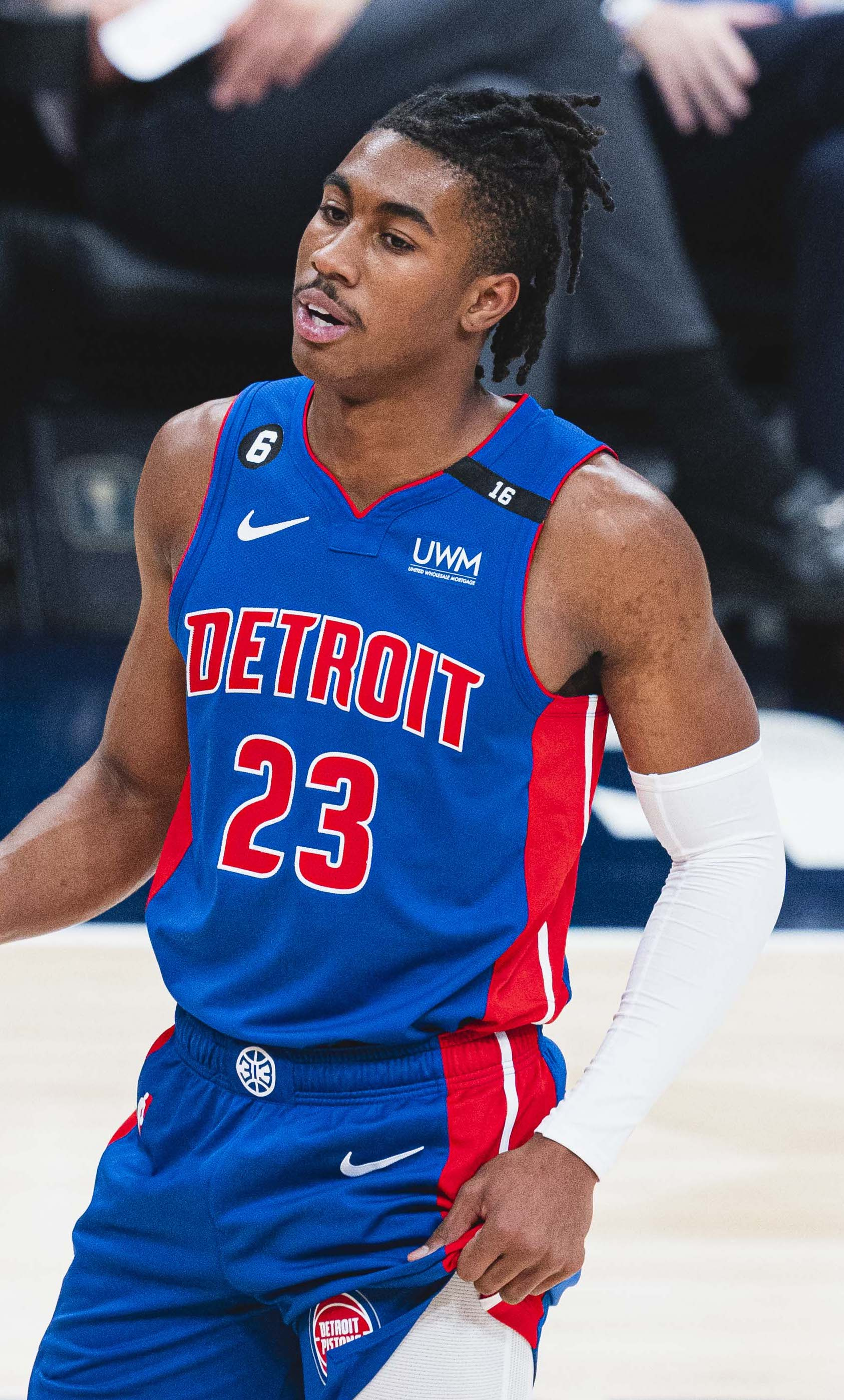
Jaden Ivey was selected 5th overall by the Detroit Pistons.

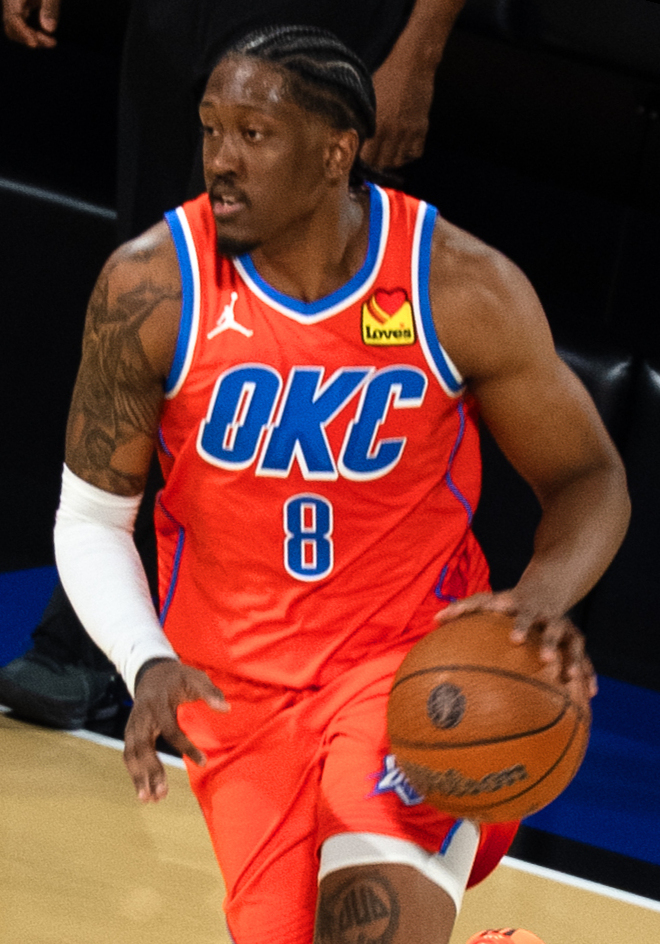
Jalen Williams was selected 12th by the Oklahoma City Thunder.

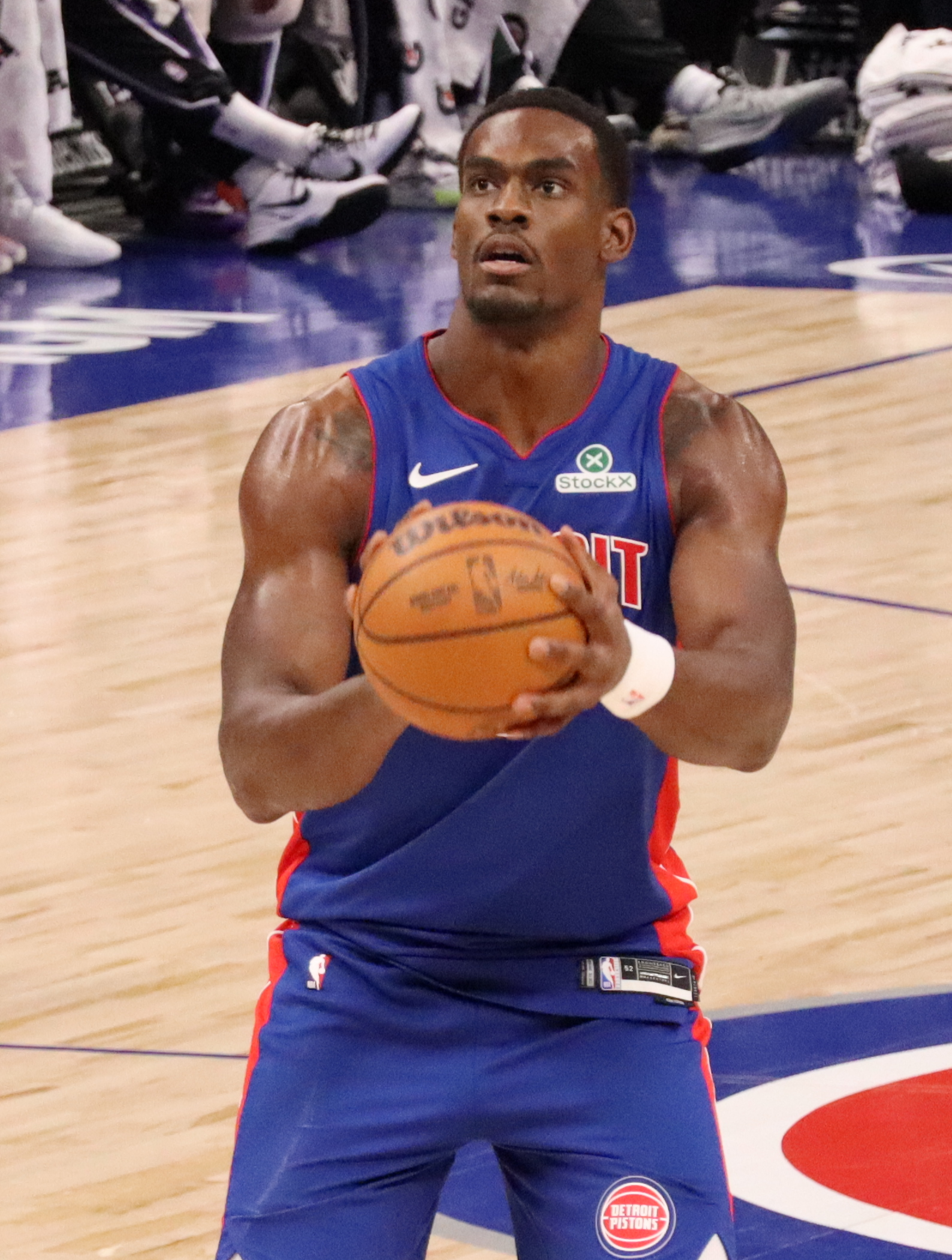
Jalen Duren was selected 13th overall by the Charlotte Hornets (traded to the Detroit Pistons via the New York Knicks).

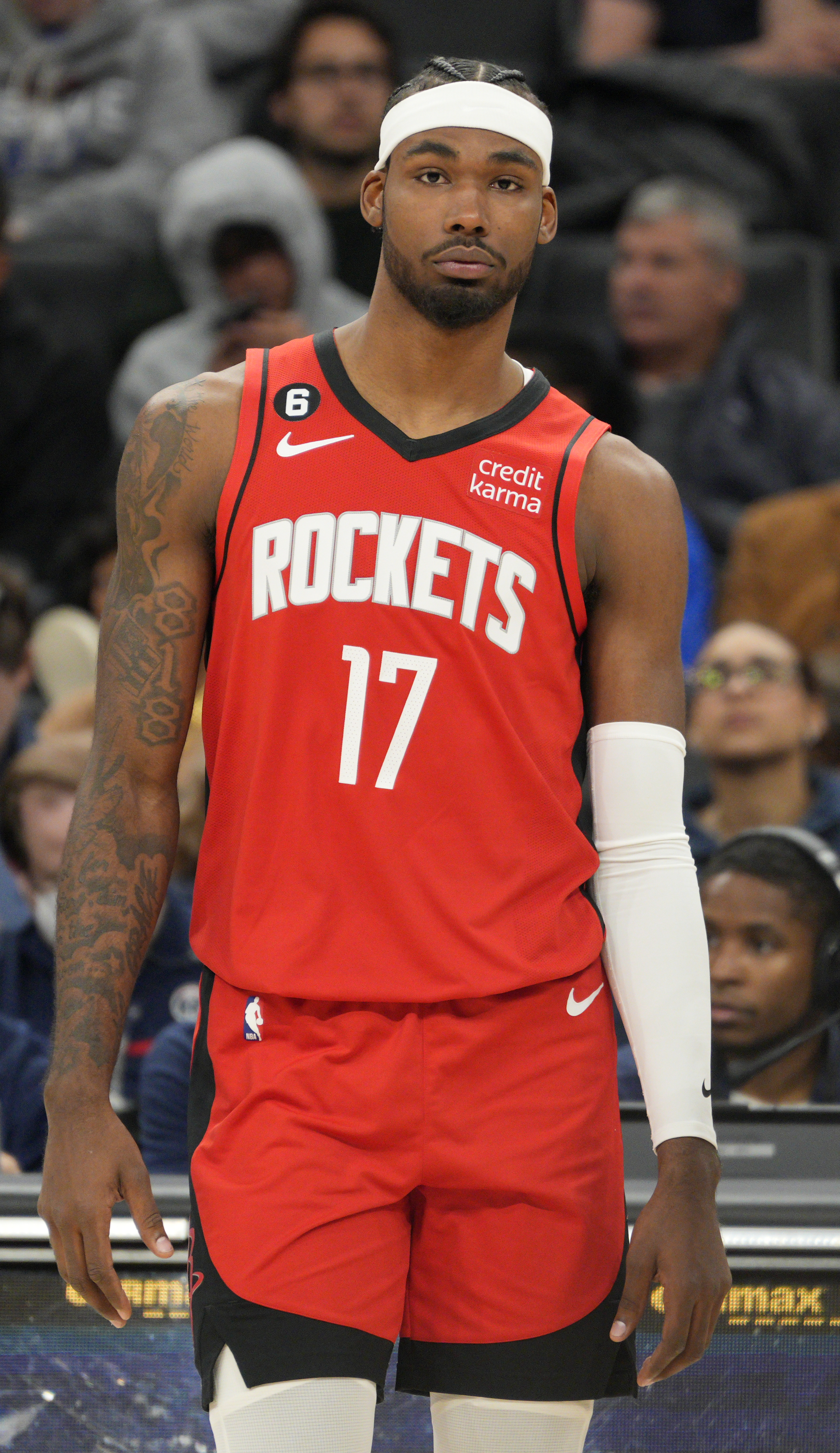
Tari Eason was selected 17th overall by the Houston Rockets.

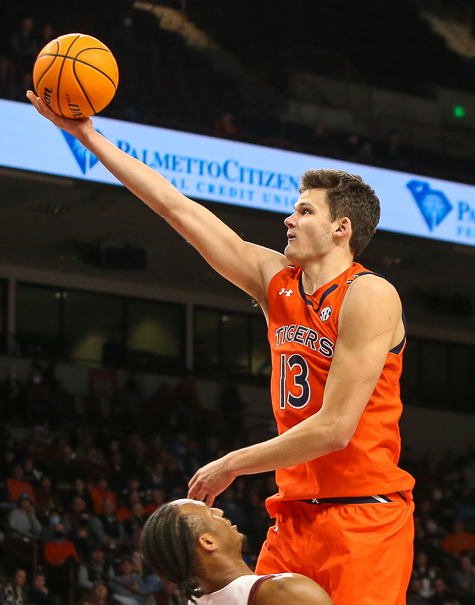
Walker Kessler was selected 22nd overall by the Memphis Grizzlies (traded to the Utah Jazz via the Minnesota Timberwolves).

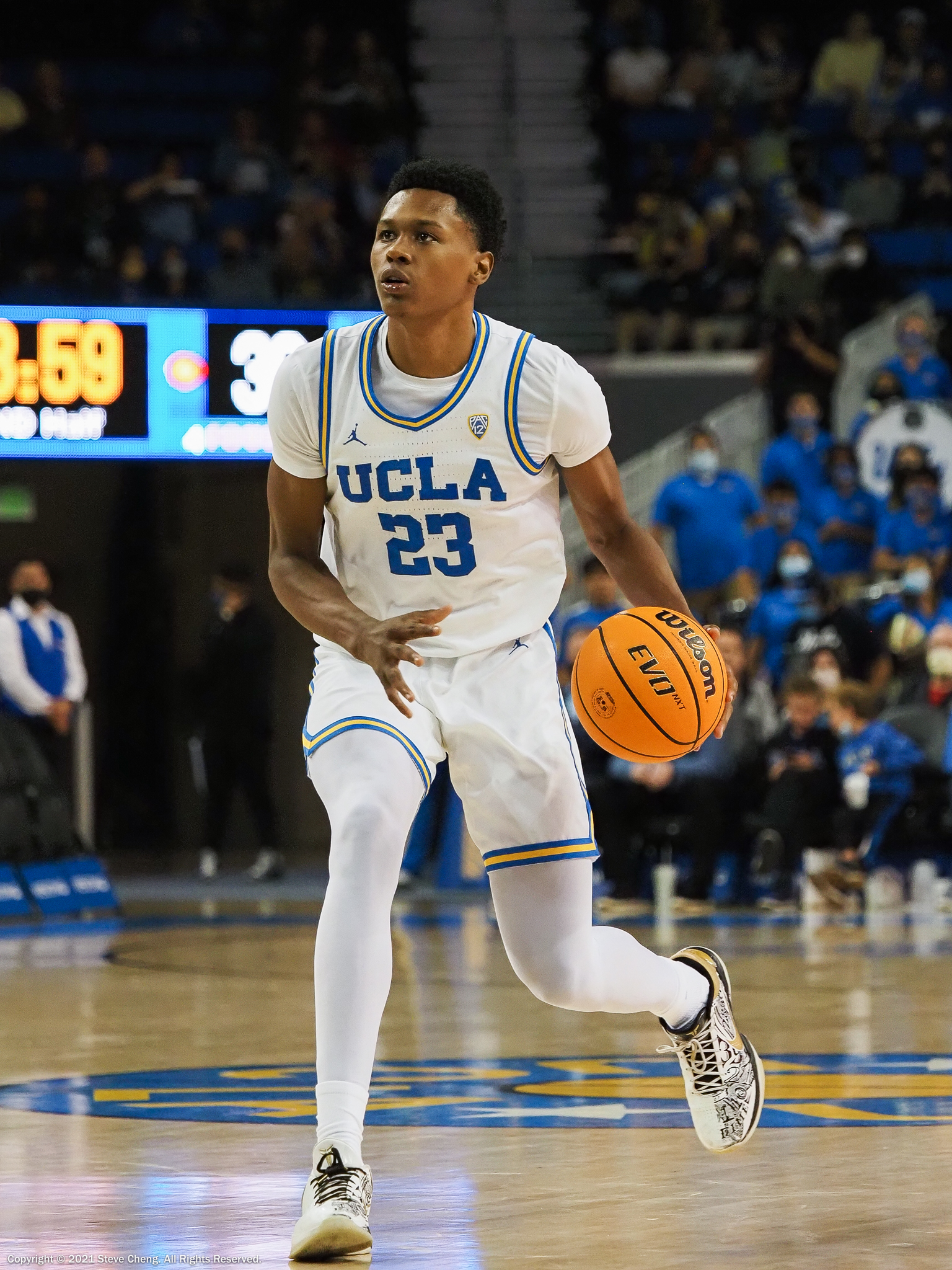
Peyton Watson was selected 30th overall by the Oklahoma City Thunder (traded to the Denver Nuggets).

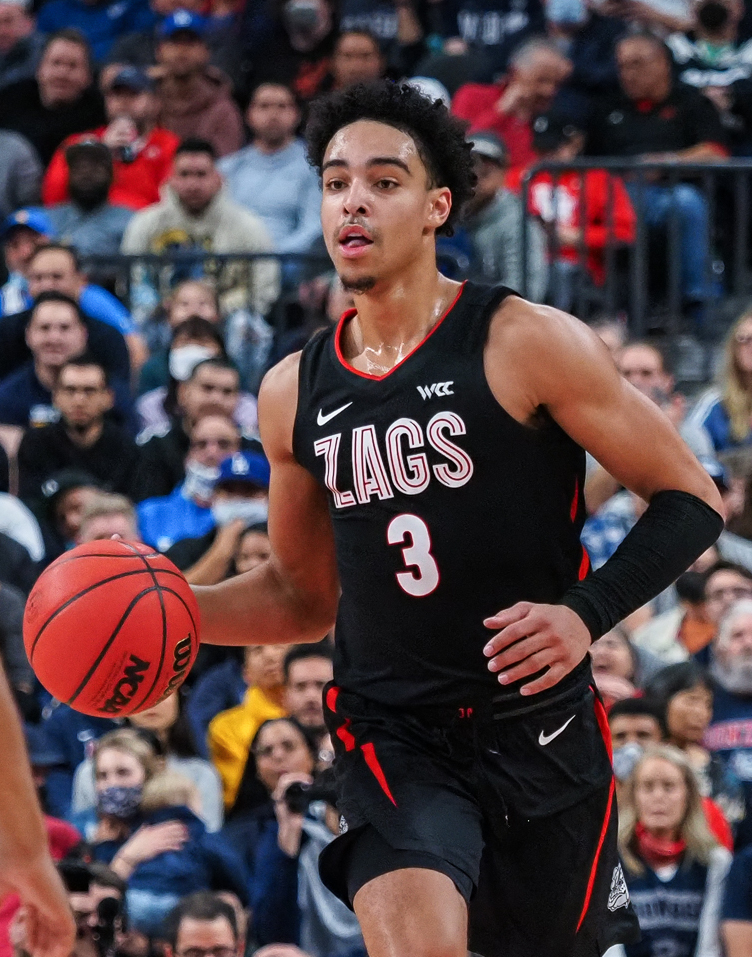
Andrew Nembhard was selected 31st overall by the Indiana Pacers.

PG	Point guard	SG	Shooting guard	SF	Small forward	PF	Power forward	C	Center

*	Denotes player who has been selected for at least one All-Star Game and All-NBA Team
^{+}	Denotes player who has been selected for at least one All-Star Game
^{x}	Denotes player who has been selected for at least one All-NBA Team
^{#}	Denotes player who has never appeared in an NBA regular-season or playoff game
^{~}	Denotes player who has been selected as Rookie of the Year

Rnd.	Pick	Player	Pos.	Nationality (Note: Nationality indicates the player's national team or representative nationality. If a player has not competed at the international level, then the nationality indicates the national team which the player is eligible to represent according to FIBA rules.)	Team	School / club team
1	1	Paolo Banchero^{~+}	PF	United States	Orlando Magic	Duke (Fr.)
1	2	Chet Holmgren^{*}	PF/C	United States	Oklahoma City Thunder	Gonzaga (Fr.)
1	3	Jabari Smith Jr.	PF	United States	Houston Rockets	Auburn (Fr.)
1	4	Keegan Murray	PF	United States	Sacramento Kings	Iowa (So.)
1	5	Jaden Ivey	PG/SG	United States	Detroit Pistons	Purdue (So.)
1	6	Bennedict Mathurin	SG/SF	Canada	Indiana Pacers	Arizona (So.)
1	7	Shaedon Sharpe	SG	Canada	Portland Trail Blazers	Kentucky (Fr.)
1	8	Dyson Daniels	PG/SG	Australia	New Orleans Pelicans (from L.A. Lakers) (Note: July 6, 2019: Los Angeles Lakers to New Orleans Pelicans (three-team trade with Washington Wizards): New Orleans acquired Lonzo Ball, Josh Hart, Brandon Ingram, the draft rights to De'Andre Hunter, a 2022 first-round pick, a 2024 first-round draft pick, the option to swap 2023 first-round picks with L.A. Lakers, and cash considerations (from Los Angeles and Washington); L.A. Lakers acquired Anthony Davis; Washington acquired Isaac Bonga, Jemerrio Jones, Moritz Wagner and a 2022 second-round draft pick)	NBA G League Ignite (NBA G League)
1	9	Jeremy Sochan	PF	Poland (Note: Sochan was born in the United States to a Polish mother and raised in England; he holds citizenship for all three countries. He represented Poland and England at a junior level but has spent his senior career with the Poland national team.)	San Antonio Spurs	Baylor (Fr.)
1	10	Johnny Davis	SG	United States	Washington Wizards	Wisconsin (So.)
1	11	Ousmane Dieng	SF	France	New York Knicks (traded to Oklahoma City) (Note: June 23, 2022: New York Knicks to Oklahoma City Thunder: Oklahoma City acquired the draft rights to Ousmane Dieng; New York acquired three protected 2023 first-round selections)	New Zealand Breakers (New Zealand)
1	12	Jalen Williams^{*}	SG/SF	United States	Oklahoma City Thunder (from L.A. Clippers) (Note: July 10, 2019: Los Angeles Clippers to Oklahoma City Thunder: Oklahoma City acquired Danilo Gallinari, Shai Gilgeous-Alexander, a 2021 first-round pick (No. 18 – Tre Mann), a 2022 first-round pick, Miami's 2023 first-round pick, a 2024 first-round pick, a 2026 first-round pick, and Thunder options to swap 2023 and 2025 first-round picks with Clippers; L.A. Clippers acquired Paul George)	Santa Clara (Jr.)
1	13	Jalen Duren^{*}	C	United States	Charlotte Hornets (traded to Detroit via New York) (Note: June 23, 2022: Charlotte Hornets to New York Knicks: Charlotte acquired a protected 2023 first-round draft selection and four future second-round draft selections; New York acquired the draft rights to Jalen Duren; July 6, 2022: Detroit Pistons to New York Knicks: Detroit acquired Kemba Walker and the draft rights to Jalen Duren; New York acquired a protected 2025 first-round selection)	Memphis (Fr.)
1	14	Ochai Agbaji	SG	United States	Cleveland Cavaliers	Kansas (Sr.)
1	15	Mark Williams	C	United States	Charlotte Hornets (from New Orleans) (Note: August 7, 2021: New Orleans Pelicans to Charlotte Hornets (three-team trade with Memphis Grizzlies): Charlotte acquired Wes Iwundu, the draft rights to Tyler Harvey, and a protected 2022 first-round pick; New Orleans acquired Jonas Valančiūnas, Devonte' Graham, the draft rights to Trey Murphy III and the draft rights to Brandon Boston Jr.; Memphis acquired Steven Adams, Eric Bledsoe, a 2022 second-round draft pick and 2025 second-round pick, the draft rights to Ziaire Williams, and the draft rights to Jared Butler)	Duke (So.)
1	16	AJ Griffin	SF	United States	Atlanta Hawks	Duke (Fr.)
1	17	Tari Eason	PF	United States	Houston Rockets (from Brooklyn) (Note: January 16, 2021: Brooklyn Nets to Houston Rockets (four-team trade with Cleveland Cavaliers and Indiana Pacers): Houston acquired Victor Oladipo, Dante Exum, Rodions Kurucs, a 2022 first-round draft selection, 2024 first-round draft selection, 2026 first-round draft selection, rights to swap first-round draft selections in 2021, 2023, 2025, and 2027, and a 2022 first-round draft selection (from Milwaukee); Brooklyn acquired James Harden and a 2024 second-round draft selection; Cleveland acquired Jarrett Allen and Taurean Prince; Indiana acquired Caris LeVert and two future second-round draft selections)	LSU (So.)
1	18	Dalen Terry	SG	United States	Chicago Bulls	Arizona (So.)
1	19	Jake LaRavia	SF	United States	Minnesota Timberwolves (traded to Memphis) (Note: June 23, 2022: Minnesota Timberwolves to Memphis Grizzlies: Memphis acquired the draft rights to Jake LaRavia and a future second-round pick; Minnesota acquired the draft rights to Walker Kessler and the draft rights to TyTy Washington)	Wake Forest (Jr.)
1	20	Malaki Branham	SG	United States	San Antonio Spurs (from Toronto) (Note: February 10, 2022: Toronto Raptors to San Antonio Spurs: San Antonio acquired Goran Dragić and a 2022 first-round draft pick; Toronto acquired Thaddeus Young and Drew Eubanks and a 2022 second-round draft pick)	Ohio State (Fr.)
1	21	Christian Braun	SG	United States	Denver Nuggets	Kansas (Jr.)
1	22	Walker Kessler	C	United States	Memphis Grizzlies (from Utah, (Note: February 10, 2022: Utah Jazz to Memphis Grizzlies: Memphis acquired Grayson Allen, Jae Crowder, Kyle Korver, the draft rights to Darius Bazley and a 2022 first-round draft pick; Utah acquired Mike Conley Jr.) traded to Utah via Minnesota (Note: July 6, 2022: Minnesota Timberwolves to Utah Jazz: Utah acquired Jarred Vanderbilt, Malik Beasley, Patrick Beverley, Leandro Bolmaro, the draft rights to Walker Kessler, 2023, 2025, 2027, and 2029 first-round picks, and 2026 right to swap first-round picks; Minnesota acquired Rudy Gobert))	Auburn (So.)
1	23	David Roddy	SF	United States	Philadelphia 76ers (traded to Memphis) (Note: June 23, 2022: Philadelphia 76ers to Memphis Grizzlies: Memphis acquired Danny Green and the draft rights to David Roddy; Philadelphia acquired De'Anthony Melton)	Colorado State (Jr.)
1	24	MarJon Beauchamp	SG/SF	United States	Milwaukee Bucks (from Milwaukee via Cleveland to Houston) (Note: December 7, 2018: Milwaukee Bucks to Cleveland Cavaliers (three-team trade with the Washington Wizards): Cleveland acquired Matthew Dellavedova, John Henson, 2021 and 2022 second-round picks, and a conditional first-round pick; Milwaukee acquired George Hill, Jason Smith, a 2020 second-round pick, Washington's 2021 second-round pick, and cash considerations; Washington acquired Sam Dekker and a conditional 2020 second-round pick) (Note: March 19, 2021: Houston Rockets to Milwaukee Bucks: Milwaukee acquired P. J. Tucker, Rodions Kurucs, and a 2022 first-round pick; Houston acquired D. J. Augustin, D. J. Wilson, a 2023 first-round pick, and option to swap a 2021 second-round pick with Milwaukee's 2021 first-round pick)	NBA G League Ignite (NBA G League)
1	25	Blake Wesley	PG/SG	United States	San Antonio Spurs (from Boston) (Note: February 10, 2022: Boston Celtics to San Antonio Spurs: San Antonio acquired Josh Richardson, Romeo Langford, a 2022 first-round pick, and the option to swap 2028 first-round draft picks; Boston acquired Derrick White)	Notre Dame (Fr.)
1	26	Wendell Moore Jr.	SF	United States	Dallas Mavericks (traded to Minnesota via Houston) (Note: June 24, 2022: Dallas Mavericks to Houston Rockets: Houston acquired the draft rights to Wendell Moore Jr., Boban Marjanovic, Trey Burke, Marquese Chriss and Sterling Brown; Dallas acquired Christian Wood) (Note: June 23, 2022: Minnesota Timberwolves to Houston Rockets: Houston acquired the draft rights to TyTy Washington, 2025 and 2027 second-round picks; Minnesota acquired the draft rights to Wendell Moore)	Duke (Jr.)
1	27	Nikola Jović	SF	Serbia	Miami Heat	Mega Mozzart (Serbia)
1	28	Patrick Baldwin Jr.	PF	United States	Golden State Warriors	Milwaukee (Fr.)
1	29	TyTy Washington Jr.	PG	United States	Memphis Grizzlies (traded to Houston via Minnesota)	Kentucky (Fr.)
1	30	Peyton Watson	SF	United States	Oklahoma City Thunder (from Phoenix, (Note: November 16, 2020: Phoenix Suns to Oklahoma City Thunder: Oklahoma City acquired Ricky Rubio, Kelly Oubre Jr., Ty Jerome, Jalen Lecque, and a 2022 first-round pick; Phoenix acquired Chris Paul and Abdel Nader) traded to Denver (Note: June 23, 2022: Oklahoma City Thunder to Denver Nuggets: Denver acquired the draft rights to Peyton Watson and two future second-round picks.; Oklahoma City acquired JaMychal Green and a 2027 protected first-round draft pick.))	UCLA (Fr.)
2	31	Andrew Nembhard	PG	Canada	Indiana Pacers (from Houston via Cleveland) (Note: February 7, 2019: Houston Rockets to Cleveland Cavaliers (three-team trade with the Sacramento Kings): Cleveland acquired Marquese Chriss, Brandon Knight, a conditional 2019 first-round pick, and a 2022 second-round pick; Houston acquired Wade Baldwin IV, Iman Shumpert, Nik Stauskas, a 2020 second-round pick swap (with Cleveland), and a 2021 second-round pick; Sacramento acquired Alec Burks) (Note: February 7, 2022: Cleveland Cavaliers to Indiana Pacers: Indiana acquired Ricky Rubio, a conditional first-round draft selection, a 2022 second-round pick, and a 2027 second-round pick; Cleveland acquired Caris LeVert and a 2022 second-round pick)	Gonzaga (Sr.)
2	32	Caleb Houstan	SF	Canada	Orlando Magic	Michigan (Fr.)
2	33	Christian Koloko	C	Cameroon	Toronto Raptors (from Detroit via Chicago to Washington to San Antonio) (Note: February 8, 2018: Detroit Pistons to Chicago Bulls: Chicago acquired Willie Reed and the option to swap 2022 second-round picks; Detroit acquired Jameer Nelson) (Note: July 6, 2019: Chicago Bulls to Washington Wizards: Washington acquired a 2020 second-round selection and the option to swap 2022 second-round picks; Chicago acquired Tomáš Satoranský) (Note: August 6, 2021: Washington Wizards to San Antonio Spurs (five-team trade with Indiana, L.A. Lakers, and Brooklyn): San Antonio acquired a 2022 second-round draft pick and Chandler Hutchison; Washington acquired Spencer Dinwiddie, Aaron Holiday, Kentavious Caldwell-Pope, Kyle Kuzma, Montrezl Harrell, the draft rights to forward Isaiah Todd, and cash considerations from Indiana; L.A. Lakers acquired Russell Westbrook and 2023, 2024, and 2028 second-round picks; Indiana acquired the draft rights to Isaiah Jackson; Brooklyn acquired the draft rights to Nikola Milutinov, a 2024 second-round pick, and the option to swap a 2025 second-round pick with Washington)	Arizona (Jr.)
2	34	Jaylin Williams	PF	United States	Oklahoma City Thunder	Arkansas (So.)
2	35	Max Christie	SG	United States	Los Angeles Lakers (from Indiana via Milwaukee to Orlando (Note: July 6, 2019: Indiana Pacers to Milwaukee Bucks: Milwaukee acquired a lottery-protected 2020 first-round pick, a future protected second-round pick, and a 2025 second-round pick; Indiana acquired Malcolm Brogdon via sign and trade; November 18, 2020: Milwaukee Bucks to Orlando Magic: Orlando acquired 2022 and 2026 second-round picks; Milwaukee acquired a 2020 second-round selection; June 23, 2022: Orlando Magic to Los Angeles Lakers: L.A. Lakers acquired 35th pick in 2022 draft; Orlando acquired a 2028 second-round pick and cash considerations))	Michigan State (Fr.)
2	36	Gabriele Procida#	SG/SF	Italy	Portland Trail Blazers (traded to Detroit) (Note: July 6, 2022: Portland Trail Blazers to Detroit Pistons: Portland acquired Jerami Grant and the draft rights to Ismaël Kamagate; Detroit acquired the draft rights to Gabriele Procida, a 2025 protected first-round pick (from Milwaukee), 2025 and 2026 second-round picks)	Fortitudo Bologna (Italy)
2	37	Jaden Hardy	SG	United States	Sacramento Kings (traded to Dallas) (Note: June 23, 2022: Dallas Mavericks to Sacramento Kings: Dallas acquired the draft rights to Jaden Hardy; Sacramento acquired 2024 and 2028 second-round picks)	NBA G League Ignite (NBA G League)
2	38	Kennedy Chandler	PG	United States	San Antonio Spurs (from L.A. Lakers via Washington to Chicago (Note: August 11, 2021: Chicago Bulls to San Antonio Spurs: San Antonio acquired Thaddeus Young, Al-Farouq Aminu, a conditional first-round pick, a 2022 second-round pick, and a 2025 second-round pick; Chicago acquired DeMar DeRozan via sign and trade), traded to Memphis (Note: June 23, 2022: Memphis Grizzlies to San Antonio Spurs: Memphis acquired the draft rights to Kennedy Chandler; San Antonio acquired a 2024 second-round draft pick (from L.A. Lakers)))	Tennessee (Fr.)
2	39	Khalifa Diop#	C	Senegal	Cleveland Cavaliers (from San Antonio via Utah) (Note: July 7, 2016: San Antonio Spurs to Utah Jazz: Utah acquired Boris Diaw, and a 2022 second-round pick; San Antonio acquired the draft rights to Olivier Hanlan; December 23, 2019: Utah Jazz to Cleveland Cavaliers: Cleveland acquired Dante Exum and 2022 and 2023 second-round picks; Utah acquired Jordan Clarkson)	Herbalife Gran Canaria (Spain)
2	40	Bryce McGowens	SG	United States	Minnesota Timberwolves (from Washington via Cleveland (Note: August 2, 2021: Cleveland Cavaliers to Minnesota Timberwolves: Minnesota acquired Taurean Prince, and a 2022 second-round pick; Cleveland acquired Ricky Rubio), traded to Charlotte (Note: June 23, 2022: Charlotte Hornets to Minnesota Timberwolves: Charlotte acquired the draft rights to Bryce McGowens; Minnesota acquired the draft rights to Josh Minott and a 2023 second-round draft pick (from New York)))	Nebraska (Fr.)
2	41	E. J. Liddell	PF	United States	New Orleans Pelicans	Ohio State (Jr.)
2	42	Trevor Keels	SG	United States	New York Knicks	Duke (Fr.)
2	43	Moussa Diabaté	PF	France	Los Angeles Clippers	Michigan (Fr.)
2	44	Ryan Rollins	SG	United States	Atlanta Hawks (traded to Golden State) (Note: June 23, 2022: Atlanta Hawks to Golden State Warriors: Atlanta acquired the draft rights to Tyrese Martin and cash considerations; Golden State acquired the draft rights to Ryan Rollins)	Toledo (So.)
2	45	Josh Minott	SF	Jamaica (Note: Minott was born in the United States but plays for the Jamaican national team.)	Charlotte Hornets (traded to Minnesota)	Memphis (Fr.)
2	46	Ismaël Kamagate#	C	France	Detroit Pistons (from Brooklyn (Note: September 4, 2021: Brooklyn Nets to Detroit Pistons: Detroit acquired DeAndre Jordan, 2022, 2024, 2025, and 2027 second-round picks; Brooklyn acquired Jahlil Okafor and Sekou Doumbouya), traded to Denver via Portland (Note: July 6, 2022: Denver Nuggets to Portland Trail Blazers: Denver acquired the draft rights to Ismaël Kamagate; Portland acquired a 2024 second-round pick))	Paris Basketball (France)
2	47	Vince Williams Jr.	SG/SF	United States	Memphis Grizzlies (from Cleveland via Atlanta to New Orleans) (Note: January 7, 2017: Cleveland Cavaliers to Atlanta Hawks: Atlanta acquired Mike Dunleavy Jr., Mo Williams, a 2021 second-round pick, a 2022 second-round pick, and cash considerations; Cleveland acquired Kyle Korver; July 6, 2019: Atlanta Hawks to New Orleans Pelicans: New Orleans Pelicans acquired the draft rights to Jaxson Hayes, Nickeil Alexander-Walker and Marcos Louzada Silva, 2021 and 2022 second-round picks; Atlanta acquired Solomon Hill, the draft rights to De'Andre Hunter and Jordan Bone, and a 2023 second-round pick)	VCU (Sr.)
2	48	Kendall Brown	SF	United States	Minnesota Timberwolves (traded to Indiana) (Note: June 23, 2022: Indiana Pacers to Minnesota Timberwolves: Minnesota acquired a 2026 second-round pick and cash considerations; Indiana acquired the draft rights to Kendall Brown)	Baylor (Fr.)
2	49	Isaiah Mobley	PF	United States	Cleveland Cavaliers (from Chicago via Detroit to Memphis to Sacramento) (Note: February 8, 2018: Detroit Pistons to Memphis Grizzlies: Memphis acquired Brice Johnson and a 2022 second-round pick; Detroit acquired James Ennis III; November 19, 2020: Memphis Grizzlies to Sacramento Kings: Sacramento acquired the draft rights to Robert Woodard II and a 2022 second-round pick; Memphis acquired the draft rights to Xavier Tillman; June 23, 2022: Sacramento Kings to Cleveland Cavaliers: Cleveland acquired 49th pick in 2022 draft; Sacramento acquired the draft rights to Sasha Vezenkov and cash considerations)	USC (Jr.)
2	50	Matteo Spagnolo#	SG	Italy	Minnesota Timberwolves (from Denver via Philadelphia) (Note: July 6, 2018: Denver Nuggets to Philadelphia 76ers: Philadelphia acquired Wilson Chandler, a 2021 second-round pick, and the option to swap 2022 second-round picks; Denver acquired cash considerations; November 12, 2018: Philadelphia 76ers to Minnesota Timberwolves: Minnesota acquired Robert Covington, Dario Šarić, Jerryd Bayless and a 2022 second-round pick; Philadelphia acquired Jimmy Butler and Justin Patton)	Vanoli Cremona (Italy)
2	51	Tyrese Martin	SG	United States	Golden State Warriors (from Toronto via Philadelphia, (Note: February 6, 2019: Toronto Raptors to Philadelphia 76ers: Philadelphia acquired Malachi Richardson, the draft rights to Emir Preldžić and a 2022 second-round pick; Toronto acquired cash considerations; February 6, 2020: Philadelphia 76ers to Golden State Warriors: Golden State acquired 2020, 2021, and 2022 second-round picks; Philadelphia acquired Alec Burks and Glenn Robinson III) traded to Atlanta)	UConn (Sr.)
2	52	Karlo Matković	C	Croatia	New Orleans Pelicans (from Utah) (Note: November 18, 2020: Utah Jazz to New Orleans Pelicans: New Orleans acquired cash considerations and a 2022 second-round pick; Utah acquired the draft rights to Elijah Hughes)	Mega Mozzart (Serbia)
2	53	JD Davison	PG	United States	Boston Celtics	Alabama (Fr.)
2	Milwaukee Bucks (forfeited due to tampering violation)					
2	Miami Heat (from Philadelphia via Denver; forfeited due to tampering violation)					
2	54	Yannick Nzosa#	C	DR Congo	Washington Wizards (from Dallas) (Note: February 10, 2022: Dallas Mavericks to Washington Wizards: Washington acquired Kristaps Porziņģis and a 2022 second-round pick; Dallas acquired Spencer Dinwiddie and Dāvis Bertāns)	Unicaja (Spain)
2	55	Gui Santos	SF	Brazil	Golden State Warriors	Minas (Brazil)
2	56	Luke Travers	SG	Australia	Cleveland Cavaliers (from Miami via Indiana) (Note: July 6, 2019: Miami Heat to Indiana Pacers (three-team trade with Phoenix Suns): Indiana acquired T. J. Warren, a 2022, a 2025, and a 2026 second-round picks; Miami acquired a 2019 second-round pick; Phoenix acquired cash considerations)	Perth Wildcats (Australia)
2	57	Jabari Walker	PF	United States	Portland Trail Blazers (from Memphis via Utah) (Note: August 7, 2021: Memphis Grizzlies to Utah Jazz: Utah acquired the draft rights to Jared Butler, a 2022 second-round pick and a 2026 second-round pick; Memphis acquired the draft rights to Santi Aldama; February 9, 2022: Utah Jazz to Portland Trail Blazers (three-team trade with San Antonio Spurs): Portland acquired Joe Ingles, Elijah Hughes and a 2022 second-round pick; Utah acquired Nickeil Alexander-Walker and Juancho Hernangómez; San Antonio acquired Tomáš Satoranský and a 2027 second-round selection)	Colorado (So.)
2	58	Hugo Besson#	PG	France	Indiana Pacers (from Phoenix, (Note: August 7, 2021: Phoenix Suns to Indiana Pacers: Indiana acquired Jalen Smith and a 2022 second-round pick; Phoenix acquired Torrey Craig and cash considerations) traded to Milwaukee) (Note: June 23, 2022: Indiana Pacers to Milwaukee Bucks: Milwaukee acquired the draft rights to Hugo Besson; Indiana acquired cash considerations)	New Zealand Breakers (Australia)

== Notable undrafted players ==
These players were not selected in the 2022 NBA draft, but have played at least one regular-season or playoff game in the NBA.

Player	Pos.	Nationality	School/club team
Ibou Badji	C	Senegal	Força Lleida CE (Spain)
Dominick Barlow	SF	United States	Team Overtime (Overtime Elite)
Jules Bernard	PG	United States	UCLA (Sr.)
Buddy Boeheim	SG	United States	Syracuse (Sr.)
Jamaree Bouyea	PG	United States	San Francisco (Sr.)
Izaiah Brockington	SG	United States	Iowa State (Sr.)
John Butler Jr.	PF	United States	Florida State (Fr.)
Jamal Cain	SF	United States	Oakland (Sr.)
Julian Champagnie	SG	United States	St. John's (Jr.)
Darius Days	PF	United States	LSU (Sr.)
Henri Drell	SG/SF	Estonia	Victoria Libertas Pesaro (Italy)
Keon Ellis	SG	United States	Alabama (Sr.)
Tyson Etienne	PG	United States	Wichita State (Jr.)
Michael Foster Jr.	PF	United States	NBA G League Ignite (NBA G League)
Javon Freeman-Liberty	SG	United States	DePaul (Sr.)
Collin Gillespie	PG	United States	Villanova (Sr.)
Jacob Gilyard	PG	United States	Richmond (Sr.)
A. J. Green	SG	United States	Northern Iowa (Sr.)
Mouhamadou Gueye	PF	United States	Pittsburgh (Sr.)
Jordan Hall	SF	United States	St. Joseph's (So.)
Ron Harper Jr.	SF	United States	Rutgers (Sr.)
Trevor Hudgins	PG	United States	Northwest Missouri State (Sr.)
Quenton Jackson	PG	United States	Texas A&M (Sr.)
Johnny Juzang	SG	United States	UCLA (Jr.)
Kenneth Lofton Jr.	PF	United States	Louisiana Tech (So.)
Justin Minaya	SF	Dominican Republic (Note: Minaya was born in the United States to a Dominican father. He has played for the Dominican Republic national basketball team.)	Providence (Sr.)
Tazé Moore	SG	United States	Houston (Sr.)
Alex Morales	SG	Puerto Rico	Wagner (Sr.)
Mãozinha Pereira	PF	Brazil	Basquete Cearense (Brazil)
Scotty Pippen Jr.	PG	United States	Vanderbilt (Jr.)
Daeqwon Plowden	SG	United States	Bowling Green (Sr.)
Lester Quiñones	SG	Dominican Republic (Note: Quiñones was born in the United States and is of Dominican descent. He has played for the Dominican Republic national basketball team.)	Memphis (Jr.)
Jared Rhoden	SF	United States	Seton Hall (Sr.)
Orlando Robinson	PF	United States	Fresno State (Jr.)
Jermaine Samuels	SF	United States	Villanova (Sr.)
Dereon Seabron	SG	United States	NC State (So.)
Jaylen Sims	SG	United States	UNC Wilmington (Sr.)
Cole Swider	PF	United States	Syracuse (Sr.)
Stanley Umude	SG	United States	Arkansas (Sr.)
Alondes Williams	PG	United States	Wake Forest (Sr.)
Donovan Williams	SG	United States	UNLV (Jr.)
Malik Williams	PF/C	United States	Louisville (Sr.)
Nate Williams	SG	United States	Buffalo (Sr.)
Lucas Williamson	PG	United States	Loyola-Chicago (Sr.)

== Trades involving draft picks ==
=== Pre-draft trades ===
Prior to the draft, the following trades were made and resulted in exchanges of draft picks between teams.

=== Draft-night trades ===
Draft-night trades are made after the draft begins. These trades are usually not confirmed until the next day or after free agency officially begins.

== Combine ==
The 8th G League Elite Camp took place May 16–17, from which certain participants will be selected to join the main draft combine. Of this year's 44 participants in the Elite Camp, seven players were chosen to continue on to the main draft combine: Jared Rhoden, Tyrese Martin, Kenneth Lofton Jr., Bryson Williams, Darius Days, Jalen Wilson, and Marcus Sasser.

The primary portion of the 2022 NBA Draft Combine was held from May 18–20 in Chicago, Illinois.

== Draft lottery ==
External videos
- 2022 NBA Draft Lottery Drawing, NBA's official YouTube channel. May 17, 2022.

The NBA draft lottery was held on May 17.

Denotes the actual lottery result

Team	2021–22 record	Lottery chances	Lottery probabilities													
Team	2021–22 record	Lottery chances	1st	2nd	3rd	4th	5th	6th	7th	8th	9th	10th	11th	12th	13th	14th
Houston Rockets	20–62	140	14.0%	13.4%	12.7%	11.9%	47.9%	–	–	–	–	–	–	–	–	–
Orlando Magic	22–60	140	14.0%	13.4%	12.7%	11.9%	27.8%	20.0%	–	–	–	–	–	–	–	–
Detroit Pistons	23–59	140	14.0%	13.4%	12.7%	12.0%	14.8%	26.0%	7.0%	–	–	–	–	–	–	–
Oklahoma City Thunder	24–58	125	12.5%	12.2%	11.9%	11.5%	7.2%	25.7%	16.7%	2.2%	–	–	–	–	–	–
Indiana Pacers	25–57	105	10.5%	10.5%	10.6%	10.5%	2.2%	19.6%	26.7%	8.7%	0.6%	–	–	–	–	–
Portland Trail Blazers	27–55	90	9.0%	9.2%	9.4%	9.6%	–	8.6%	29.8%	20.6%	3.7%	0.1%	–	–	–	–
Sacramento Kings	30–52	75	7.5%	7.8%	8.1%	8.5%	–	–	19.7%	34.1%	12.9%	1.3%	<0.1%	–	–	–
Los Angeles Lakers (to New Orleans)	33–49	60	6.0%	6.3%	6.7%	7.2%	–	–	–	34.5%	32.1%	6.7%	0.4%	<0.1%	–	–
San Antonio Spurs	34–48	45	4.5%	4.8%	5.2%	5.7%	–	–	–	–	50.7%	26.9%	3.0%	0.1%	<0.1%	–
Washington Wizards	35–47	30	3.0%	3.3%	3.6%	4.0%	–	–	–	–	–	65.9%	19.0%	1.2%	<0.1%	<0.1%
New York Knicks	37–45	20	2.0%	2.2%	2.4%	2.8%	–	–	–	–	–	–	77.6%	12.6%	0.4%	<0.1%
Los Angeles Clippers (to Oklahoma City)	42–40	15	1.5%	1.7%	1.9%	2.1%	–	–	–	–	–	–	–	86.1%	6.7%	0.1%
Charlotte Hornets	43–39	10	1.0%	1.1%	1.2%	1.4%	–	–	–	–	–	–	–	–	92.9%	2.3%
Cleveland Cavaliers	44–38	5	0.5%	0.6%	0.6%	0.7%	–	–	–	–	–	–	–	–	–	97.6%

== Eligibility and entrants ==
The draft is conducted under the eligibility rules established in the league's 2017 collective bargaining agreement (CBA) with its players' union, with special modifications agreed to by both parties due to disruptions caused by the COVID-19 pandemic. The previous CBA that ended the 2011 lockout instituted no immediate changes to the draft, but it called for a committee of owners and players to discuss further charges.

- All drafted players must be at least 19 years old during the calendar year of the draft. In term of dates, players who were eligible for the 2022 NBA draft must have been born on or before December 31, 2003.
  - This draft could have possibly been the first in which high school players of any nationality would have been eligible for selection after their graduation as the two associations sought at first to lower the minimum age back to 18 and end the need to wait one year after their high school class graduated, also called the "one and done" requirement, as discussed in 2019. If approved, the current CBA might have to be amended and the amendment ratified. However, the ineligibility for the draft shortly after high school remained in place, as reported in 2020, unless there were further discussions about its repeal.
- Since the 2016 draft, the following rules are, as implemented by the NCAA Division I council for that division:
  - Declaration for the draft no longer results in automatic loss of college eligibility. As long as a player does not sign a contract with a professional team outside the NBA or sign with an agent, he retains college eligibility as long as he makes a timely withdrawal from the draft.
  - NCAA players now have 10 days after the end of the NBA draft combine to withdraw from the draft. Since the combine is normally held in mid-May, the current deadline is about five weeks after the previous mid-April deadline.
  - NCAA players may participate in the draft combine and are allowed to attend one tryout per year with each NBA team without losing college eligibility.
  - NCAA players may now enter and withdraw from the draft up to two times without loss of eligibility. Previously, the NCAA treated a second declaration of draft eligibility as a permanent loss of college eligibility.

=== Early entrants ===
Players who were not automatically eligible had to declare their eligibility for the draft by notifying the NBA offices in writing no later than at least 60 days before the event. For the 2022 draft, the date fell on April 24. Under the CBA a player may withdraw his name from consideration from the draft at any time before the final declaration deadline, which usually falls 10 days before the draft at 5:00 p.m. EDT (2100 UTC). Under current NCAA rules, players usually have until 10 days after the draft combine to withdraw from the draft and retain college eligibility. They must have withdrawn on or before June 1, 22 days prior to this draft.

A player who has hired an agent retains his remaining college eligibility regardless of whether he is drafted after an evaluation from the NBA Undergraduate Advisory Committee. Players who declare for the NBA draft and are not selected have the opportunity to return to their school for at least another year only after terminating all agreements with their agents, who must have been certified.

==== College underclassmen ====
- (United States) Patrick Baldwin Jr. – F, Milwaukee (freshman)
- (United States) Paolo Banchero – F, Duke (freshman)
- (United States) Malaki Branham – G/F, Ohio State (freshman)
- (United States) Christian Braun – G, Kansas (junior)
- (United States) Kendall Brown – G/F, Baylor (freshman)
- (United States) John Butler Jr. – F, Florida State (freshman)
- (United States) Julian Champagnie – G/F, St. John's (junior)
- (United States) Kennedy Chandler – G, Tennessee (freshman)
- (United States) Max Christie – G, Michigan State (freshman)
- (Jamaica) Kofi Cockburn – C, Illinois (junior)
- (United States) Johnny Davis – G/F, Wisconsin (sophomore)
- (United States) JD Davison – G, Alabama (freshman)
- (France) Moussa Diabaté – F, Michigan (freshman)
- (United States) Jalen Duren – C, Memphis (freshman)
- (United States) Tari Eason – F, LSU (sophomore)
- (United States) Tyson Etienne – G, Wichita State (junior)
- (United States) A. J. Green – G, Northern Iowa (redshirt junior)
- (United States) Adrian Griffin Jr. – F, Duke (freshman)
- (United States) Jordan Hall – G/F, Saint Joseph's (sophomore)
- (United States) Chet Holmgren – C/F, Gonzaga (freshman)
- (Canada) Caleb Houstan – G/F, Michigan (freshman)
- (United States) Jaden Ivey – G, Purdue (sophomore)
- (United States) Jaden Jones – G/F, Rutgers (redshirt freshman)
- (United States) Johnny Juzang – G, UCLA (junior)
- (United States) Trevor Keels – G, Duke (freshman)
- (United States) Walker Kessler – C, Auburn (sophomore)
- (Cameroon) Christian Koloko – C, Arizona (junior)
- (United States) Jake LaRavia – F, Wake Forest (junior)
- (South Korea) Hyunjung Lee – G/F, Davidson (junior)
- (United States) Justin Lewis – F, Marquette (sophomore)
- (United States) E. J. Liddell – F, Ohio State (junior)
- (United States) Kenneth Lofton Jr. – F, Louisiana Tech (sophomore)
- (Canada) Bennedict Mathurin – G, Arizona (sophomore)
- (United States) Bryce McGowens – G, Nebraska (freshman)
- (United States) / (Jamaica) Josh Minott – F, Memphis (freshman)
- (United States) Isaiah Mobley – F, USC (junior)
- (Nigeria) Aminu Mohammed – G, Georgetown (freshman)
- (Panama) Iverson Molinar – G, Mississippi State (junior)
- (United States) Wendell Moore Jr. – F, Duke (junior)
- (United States) Keegan Murray – F, Iowa (sophomore)
- (United States) Shareef O'Neal – F, LSU (junior)
- (United States) Scotty Pippen Jr. – G, Vanderbilt (junior)
- (United States) / (Dominican Republic) Lester Quiñones – G, Memphis (junior)
- (United States) Orlando Robinson – F, Fresno State (junior)
- (United States) David Roddy – F, Colorado State (junior)
- (United States) Ryan Rollins – G, Toledo (sophomore)
- (United States) Dereon Seabron – G, NC State (redshirt sophomore)
- (United States) Jaden Shackelford – G, Alabama (junior)
- (Canada) Shaedon Sharpe – G, Kentucky (freshman)
- (United States) Jabari Smith Jr. – F, Auburn (freshman)
- (Poland) / (United States) Jeremy Sochan – F, Baylor (freshman)
- (United States) AJ Taylor – F, Grambling State (redshirt junior)
- (United States) Dalen Terry – G, Arizona (sophomore)
- (United States) Jabari Walker – F, Colorado (sophomore)
- (United States) TyTy Washington – G, Kentucky (freshman)
- (United States) Peyton Watson – G/F, UCLA (freshman)
- (United States) Blake Wesley – G, Notre Dame (freshman)
- (United States) Donovan Williams – G/F, UNLV (junior)
- (United States) Jalen Williams – G, Santa Clara (junior)
- (United States) Jaylin Williams – F, Arkansas (sophomore)
- (United States) Mark Williams – C, Duke (sophomore)

==== College seniors ====
"Redshirt" refers to players who were redshirt seniors in the 2021–22 season. "Graduate" refers to players who were graduate transfers in 2021–22.

- (United States) Jalen Adaway – G, St. Bonaventure (redshirt)
- (United States) Ochai Agbaji – G, Kansas
- (United States) James Akinjo – G, Baylor
- (United States) Teddy Allen – G/F, New Mexico State (redshirt)
- (United States) Keve Aluma – F, Virginia Tech (redshirt)
- (Puerto Rico) Eric Ayala – G, Maryland
- (United States) Marcus Azor – G, UMass Dartmouth
- (United States) David Azore – G, UT Arlington (graduate)
- (United States) Evan Battey – F, Colorado (redshirt)
- (United States) Justin Bean – F, Utah State (redshirt)
- (United States) Jules Bernard – G, UCLA
- (United States) Jamal Bieniemy – G, UTEP
- (United States) Marcus Bingham Jr. – F, Michigan State
- (United States) Buddy Boeheim – G, Syracuse
- (United States) Jamaree Bouyea – G, San Francisco
- (Austria) Luka Brajkovic – F, Davidson
- (United States) Izaiah Brockington – G, Iowa State (redshirt)
- (United States) Gabe Brown – F, Michigan State
- (United States) Tevin Brown – G, Murray State (redshirt)
- (Canada) Maurice Calloo – F, Oregon State
- (United States) R. J. Cole – G, UConn (graduate)
- (United States) Vince Cole – G/F, Coastal Carolina
- (Puerto Rico) George Conditt IV – F, Iowa State
- (United States) Darius Days – F, LSU
- (United States) Adrian Delph – G, Appalachian State
- (United States) Michael Devoe – G, Georgia Tech
- (United States) Anthony Duruji – F, Florida (redshirt)
- (United States) Kyler Edwards – G, Houston
- (United States) Keon Ellis – G, Alabama
- (United States) Javon Freeman-Liberty – G, DePaul
- (United States) Both Gach – G, Utah
- (United States) Bryce Hamilton – G, UNLV
- (United States) Ron Harper Jr. – G/F, Rutgers
- (United States) DJ Harvey – G/F, Detroit Mercy (graduate)
- (United States) Jericole Hellems – F, NC State
- (United States) Cedric Henderson Jr. – G/F, Campbell
- (United States) Trevor Hudgins – G, Northwest Missouri State (redshirt)
- (United States) Bodie Hume – G, Northern Colorado
- (United States) Austin Hutcherson – G, Illinois (graduate)
- (United States) Drake Jeffries – G, Wyoming (redshirt)
- (United States) Andrew Jones – G, Texas
- (United States) DeVante' Jones – G, Michigan (graduate)
- (Canada) Noah Kirkwood – G, Harvard
- (United States) Peter Kiss – G, Bryant (graduate)
- (United States) Tyrese Martin – G/F, UConn
- (United States) David McCormack – F, Kansas
- (United States) Trey McGowens – G, Nebraska
- (United States) / (Dominican Republic) Justin Minaya – F, Providence (graduate)
- (United States) Isaiah Mucius – F, Wake Forest
- (United States) Grayson Murphy – G, Belmont (graduate)
- (United States) Nick Muszynski – C, Belmont (graduate)
- (Canada) Andrew Nembhard – G, Gonzaga
- (United States) JD Notae – G, Arkansas (redshirt)
- (Nigeria) Ike Obiagu – C, Seton Hall (graduate)
- (United States) Edward Oliver-Hampton – F, South Carolina State (graduate)
- (United States) Malik Osborne – F, Florida State (graduate)
- (Switzerland) Anthony Polite – G/F, Florida State (graduate)
- (United States) M. J. Randolph – G, Florida A&M
- (United States) A. J. Reeves – G, Providence
- (United States) Jared Rhoden – G/F, Seton Hall
- (United States) Ronaldo Segu – G, Buffalo
- (United States) Jaylen Sims – G, UNC Wilmington
- (Mali) Amadou Sow – F, UC Santa Barbara
- (United States) Seth Stanley – F, Hendrix
- (Italy) Gabe Stefanini – G, San Francisco
- (United States) / (Serbia) Sasha Stefanovic – G, Purdue (redshirt)
- (United States) Au'Diese Toney – G, Arkansas
- (United States) Ryan Turell – F, Yeshiva
- (United States) Dallas Walton – F/C, Wake Forest (graduate)
- (United States) Collin Welp – F, UC Irvine (redshirt)
- (United States) Aaron Wheeler – F, St. John's (graduate)
- (United States) Khristien White – G, Southwestern Christian
- (United States) Nate Williams – G/F, Buffalo
- (United States) Trevion Williams – F/C, Purdue
- (United States) Vince Williams Jr. – G/F, VCU

==== International players ====
International players that declared for this draft and did not previously declare in another prior draft could drop out 10 days before the event, on June 13.

- (Senegal) Ibou Badji – C, Força Lleida (Spain)
- (France) Hugo Besson – G, New Zealand Breakers (Australia)
- (France) Ousmane Dieng – F, New Zealand Breakers (Australia)
- (Senegal) Khalifa Diop – C, Herbalife Gran Canaria (Spain)
- Nikola Jović – F, Mega Mozzart (Serbia)
- Ismaël Kamagate – C, Paris Basketball (France)
- (Croatia) / (Bosnia and Herzegovina) Karlo Matković – C, Mega Mozzart (Serbia)
- (Democratic Republic of the Congo) Yannick Nzosa – C, Unicaja (Spain)
- Gabriele Procida – G, Fortitudo Bologna (Italy)
- (Slovenia) Žiga Samar – G, Urbas Fuenlabrada (Spain)
- Gui Santos – F, Minas (Brazil)
- (Russia) Pavel Savkov – F, Saski Baskonia (Spain)
- (Philippines) Kai Sotto – C, Adelaide 36ers (Australia)
- Matteo Spagnolo – G, Vanoli Cremona (Italy)

=== Automatically eligible entrants ===
Players who do not meet the criteria for "international" players are automatically eligible if they meet any of the following criteria:

- They have no remaining college eligibility.
- If they graduated from high school in the U.S., but did not enroll in a U.S. college or university, four years have passed since their high school class graduated.
- They have signed a contract with a professional basketball team not in the NBA, anywhere in the world, and have played under the contract.

Players who meet the criteria for "international" players are automatically eligible if they meet any of the following criteria:

- They are at least 22 years old during the calendar year of the draft. In term of dates players born on or before December 31, 2000, were automatically eligible for the 2022 draft.
- They have signed a contract with a professional basketball team not in the NBA within the United States, and have played under that contract.

Other automatically eligible players
Player	Team	Note	Ref.
(Australia) Biwali Bayles	Sydney Kings (Australia)	Left Hawaii in 2021; playing professionally since the 2021–22 season	
(United States) MarJon Beauchamp	NBA G League Ignite (NBA G League)	Left Yakima Valley in 2021; playing professionally since the 2021–22 season	
(Australia) Oliver Hayes-Brown	Perth Wildcats (Australia)	Left UC Riverside in 2021; playing professionally since the 2021–22 season	
(South Sudan) / (Australia) Bul Kuol	Cairns Taipans (Australia)	Left Detroit Mercy in 2021; playing professionally since the 2021–22 season	
(South Sudan) / (Australia) Makur Maker	Sydney Kings (Australia)	Left Howard in 2021; playing professionally since the 2021–22 season	
(Australia) Zac Triplett	Melbourne United (Australia)	Left Portland in 2021; playing professionally since the 2021–22 season	

== Invited attendees ==
The NBA annually invites players to sit in the so-called "green room", a special room set aside at the draft site for the invited players plus their families and agents. This season, the following 20 players were invited (listed alphabetically).

- (United States) Ochai Agbaji, Kansas
- (United States) Paolo Banchero, Duke
- (United States) MarJon Beauchamp, NBA G League Ignite (NBA G League)
- (United States) Malaki Branham, Ohio State
- (Australia) Dyson Daniels, NBA G League Ignite (NBA G League)
- (United States) Johnny Davis, Wisconsin
- (France) Ousmane Dieng, New Zealand Breakers (Australia/New Zealand)
- (United States) Jalen Duren, Memphis
- (United States) Tari Eason, LSU
- (United States) AJ Griffin, Duke
- (United States) Chet Holmgren, Gonzaga
- (United States) Jaden Ivey, Purdue
- (Canada) Bennedict Mathurin, Arizona
- (United States) Keegan Murray, Iowa
- (Canada) Shaedon Sharpe, Kentucky
- (United States) Jabari Smith Jr., Auburn
- (Poland) / (United States) Jeremy Sochan, Baylor
- (United States) TyTy Washington Jr., Kentucky
- (United States) Jalen Williams, Santa Clara
- (United States) Mark Williams, Duke

== See also ==
- List of first overall NBA draft picks
