= Blake Wesley (basketball) =

American basketball player (born 2003)

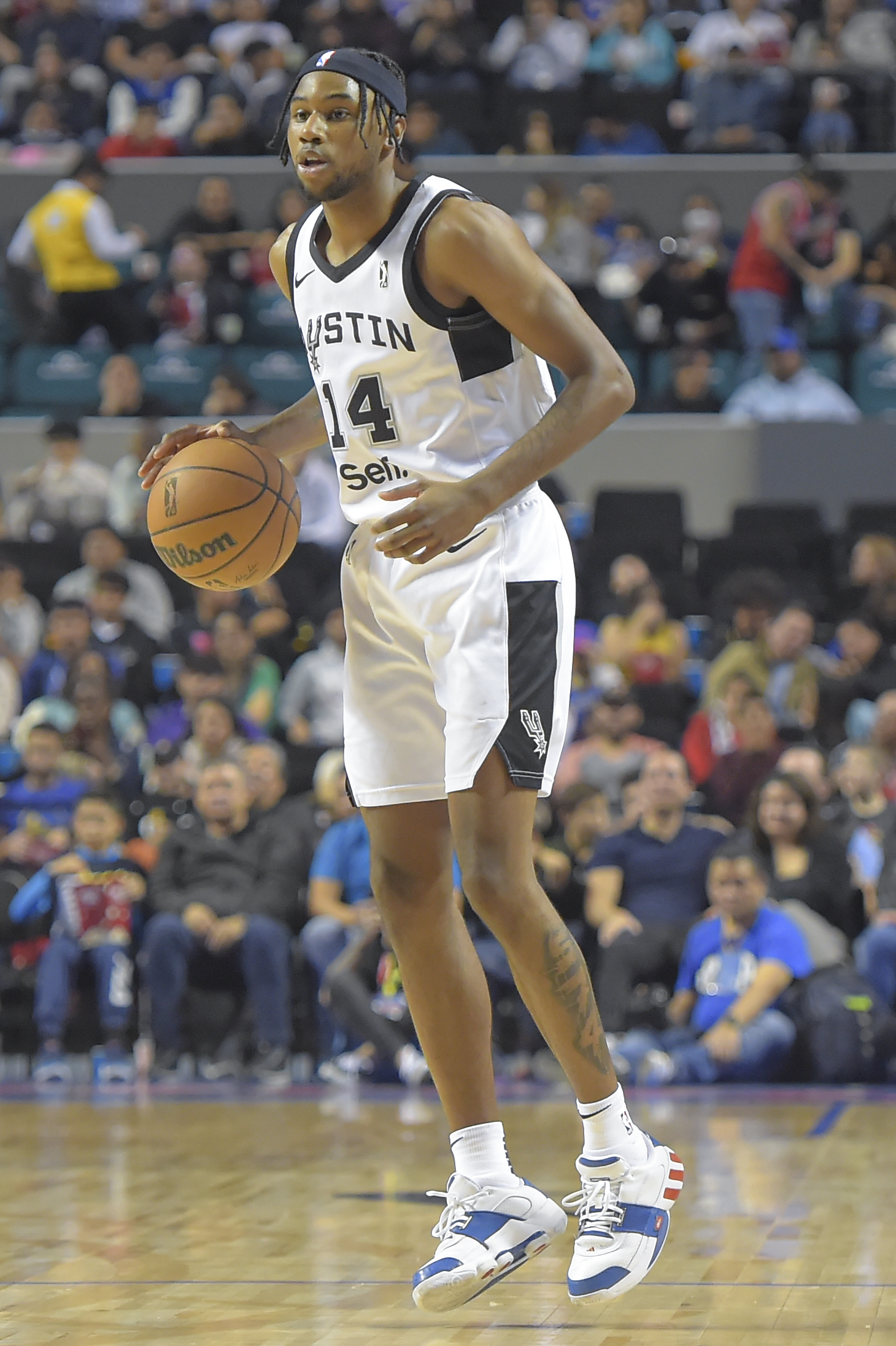
- Wesley with the Austin Spurs in 2022

No. 20 – San Diego Clippers
- Position: Point guard / shooting guard
- League: NBA G League

Personal information
- Born: March 16, 2003 (age 23) South Bend, Indiana, U.S.
- Listed height: 6 ft 4 in (1.93 m)
- Listed weight: 190 lb (86 kg)

Career information
- High school: Riley (South Bend, Indiana)
- College: Notre Dame (2021–2022)
- NBA draft: 2022: 1st round, 25th overall pick
- Drafted by: San Antonio Spurs
- Playing career: 2022–present

Career history
- 2022–2025: San Antonio Spurs
- 2022–2023: →Austin Spurs
- 2025–2026: Portland Trail Blazers
- 2026: Los Angeles Clippers
- 2026–present: San Diego Clippers

Career highlights
- Second-team All-ACC (2022); ACC All-Rookie Team (2022)
- Stats at NBA.com
- Stats at Basketball Reference

Blake Carrington Wesley (born March 16, 2003) is an American professional basketball player for the San Diego Clippers of the NBA G League. He played college basketball for the Notre Dame Fighting Irish.

== Early life ==
Wesley played for James Whitcomb Riley High School in South Bend, Indiana. As a junior, he averaged 26 points and 6.3 rebounds per game. In his senior season, Wesley averaged 27.1 points, 6.1 rebounds and 2.5 steals per game, leading Riley to the Class 4A sectional title. He was named to the Indiana All-Star team.

Wesley was a consensus four-star recruit. On November 20, 2020, he committed to playing college basketball for Notre Dame, choosing the Fighting Irish over offers from Creighton, Kansas State, Louisville, Maryland, Purdue and Xavier.

College recruiting
Name	Hometown	School	Height	Weight	Commit date
Blake Wesley; PG / SG	South Bend, IN	Riley (IN)	6 ft 4 in (1.93 m)	170 lb (77 kg)	Nov 20, 2020
Blake Wesley; PG / SG	Recruit ratings: Rivals: 247Sports: ESPN: (82)				
Overall recruit ranking: Rivals: 104 247Sports: 116 ESPN: —
Note: In many cases, Scout, Rivals, 247Sports, On3, and ESPN may conflict in their listings of height and weight.; In these cases, the average was taken. ESPN grades are on a 100-point scale.; Sources: "Notre Dame 2021 Basketball Commitments". Rivals.; "2021 Notre Dame Fighting Irish Recruiting Class". ESPN.; "2021 Team Ranking". Rivals.

== College career ==
Wesley had an immediate impact during his freshman season at Notre Dame, and analysts began to consider him a first-round 2022 NBA draft prospect. In his college debut on November 13, 2021, he scored 21 points in a 68–52 win over Cal State Northridge. On November 29, 2021, Wesley scored a career-high 24 points in an 82–72 loss to Illinois. He was named to the Second Team All-ACC as well as the All-Rookie Team. As a freshman, Wesley averaged 14.4 points, 3.7 rebounds and 2.4 assists per game. On March 30, 2022, he declared for the 2022 NBA draft, forgoing his remaining college eligibility.

== Professional career ==
=== San Antonio Spurs (2022–2025) ===
On June 23, 2022, Wesley was selected with the 25th pick in the 2022 NBA draft by the San Antonio Spurs. Wesley joined the Spurs' 2022 NBA Summer League roster. In his Summer League debut, Wesley scored twenty points and five assists in a 90–99 loss against the Cleveland Cavaliers. On July 5, Wesley signed a rookie-scale contract with the Spurs. Wesley made his NBA debut on October 28, scoring 10 points and 4 assists in a 129–124 win against the Chicago Bulls. Two days later, in his second career game, Wesley tore his left MCL when he collided with Jaden McDaniels during the second quarter. Wesley was assigned to the Austin Spurs on December 16, and returned to game action less than 7 weeks after his injury, scoring 12 points in a 112–102 loss to the Capitanes de la Ciudad de México on December 16.

=== Portland Trail Blazers (2025–2026) ===
On July 9, 2025, Wesley and Malaki Branham were traded to the Washington Wizards in exchange for Kelly Olynyk. On July 19, Wesley was waived by the Wizards after agreeing to a buyout. On July 22, Wesley signed with the Portland Trail Blazers. On November 3, Wesley suffered a fracture to the fifth metatarsal of his right foot during a game against the Denver Nuggets. After undergoing surgery, he was ruled out for 8-to-12 weeks.

=== Los Angeles / San Diego Clippers (2026–present) ===
On September 27, 2026, Wesley signed a one-year contract with the Los Angeles Clippers. On October 17, the Clippers waived Wesley. He played with the team throughout the preseason, averaging 6 points, 2 assists and 1.3 rebounds playing at average of 15 minutes over the course of 3 games.

On October 29, Wesley signed a 10-day hardship contract with the Clippers.

== Career statistics ==
Legend
GP	Games played	GS	Games started	MPG	Minutes per game
FG%	Field goal percentage	3P%	3-point field goal percentage	FT%	Free throw percentage
RPG	Rebounds per game	APG	Assists per game	SPG	Steals per game
BPG	Blocks per game	PPG	Points per game	**Bold**	Career high

=== NBA ===
==== Regular season ====
Year	Team	GP	GS	MPG	FG%	3P%	FT%	RPG	APG	SPG	BPG	PPG
2022–23	San Antonio	37	1	**18.1**	.321	**.385**	.591	**2.2**	2.6	**0.7**	0.1	**5.0**
2023–24	San Antonio	**61**	**3**	14.4	**.474**	.218	**.667**	1.5	**2.7**	0.5	0.1	4.4
2024–25	San Antonio	58	0	11.8	.435	.293	.623	1.1	2.0	0.6	0.1	3.7
2025–26	Portland	31	0	11.6	.452	.278	.553	1.3	2.0	0.5	**0.2**	4.8
2026–27	L.A. Clippers	2	0	4.7	.000	.000	100.0	**2.0**	.0	.0	.0	1.0
Career		158	4	14.0	.416	.294	.620	2.0	2.4	0.6	0.1	4.4

==== Playoffs ====
Year	Team	GP	GS	MPG	FG%	3P%	FT%	RPG	APG	SPG	BPG	PPG
2026	Portland	4	0	1.3	–	–	.500	.0	.0	.0	.0	.3
Career		4	0	1.3	–	–	.500	.0	.0	.0	.0	.3

=== College ===
Year	Team	GP	GS	MPG	FG%	3P%	FT%	RPG	APG	SPG	BPG	PPG
2021–22	Notre Dame	35	28	29.3	.404	.303	.657	3.7	2.4	1.3	.1	14.4
