= Malaki Branham =

American basketball player (born 2003)

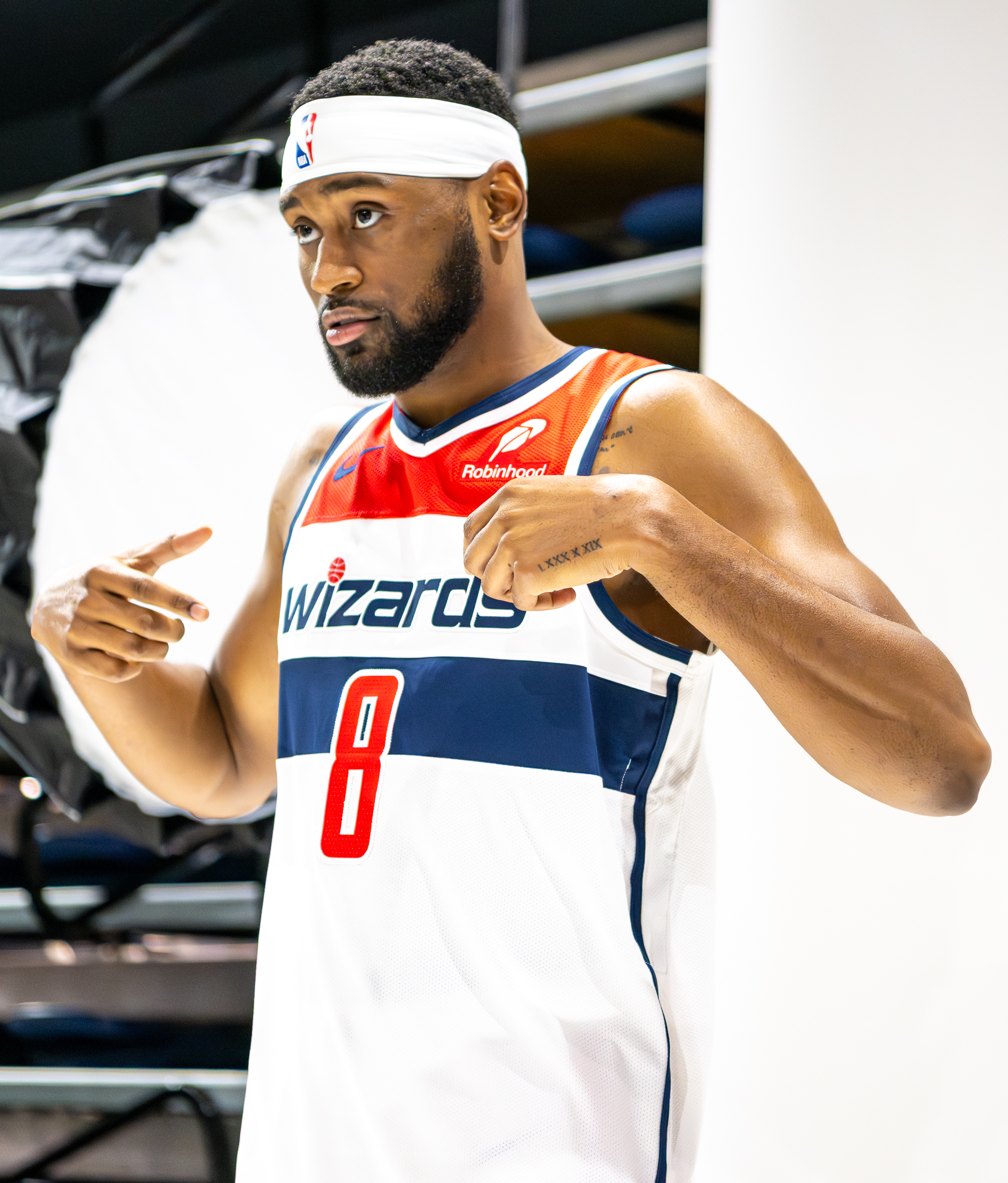
- Branham with the Washington Wizards in 2025

No. 22 – Osceola Magic
- Position: Shooting guard
- League: NBA G League

Personal information
- Born: May 12, 2003 (age 23) Columbus, Ohio, U.S.
- Listed height: 6 ft 5 in (1.96 m)
- Listed weight: 180 lb (82 kg)

Career information
- High school: St. Vincent–St. Mary (Akron, Ohio)
- College: Ohio State (2021–2022)
- NBA draft: 2022: 1st round, 20th overall pick
- Drafted by: San Antonio Spurs
- Playing career: 2022–present

Career history
- 2022–2025: San Antonio Spurs
- 2022: →Austin Spurs
- 2025–2026: Washington Wizards
- 2026: Cleveland Charge
- 2026–present: Osceola Magic

Career highlights
- Third-team All-Big Ten (2022); Big Ten Freshman of the Year (2022); Big Ten All-Freshman Team (2022); Ohio Mr. Basketball (2021)
- Stats at NBA.com
- Stats at Basketball Reference

Malaki Lamar Branham (born May 12, 2003) is an American professional basketball player for the Osceola Magic of the NBA G League. He played college basketball for the Ohio State Buckeyes.

== Early life ==
Branham was raised in Columbus, Ohio. Starting in fifth grade, he trained under Jason Dawson in Columbus. He moved to Akron, Ohio where he attended high school at St. Vincent–St. Mary High School. At St. Vincent–St. Mary, he won two state championships in 2018 and 2021. He was named first team All-Ohio in his junior and senior seasons. As a senior, Branham averaged 21.3 points, 5.1 rebounds, 2.7 assists and 1.8 steals per game. In his senior season, he was named Ohio Mr. Basketball and made the Jordan Brand Classic, which was not played due to the COVID-19 pandemic.

Branham was a consensus four-star recruit and ranked as the best player in Ohio. On July 22, 2020, Branham committed to playing college basketball for Ohio State over offers from teams such as Alabama, Baylor and Iowa.

College recruiting
Name	Hometown	School	Height	Weight	Commit date
Malaki Branham; SG / SF	Columbus, OH	St. Vincent–St. Mary	6 ft 5 in (1.96 m)	180 lb (82 kg)	Jul 22, 2020
Malaki Branham; SG / SF	Recruit ratings: Rivals: 247Sports: ESPN: (88)				
Overall recruit ranking: Rivals: 44 247Sports: 35 ESPN: 34
Note: In many cases, Scout, Rivals, 247Sports, On3, and ESPN may conflict in their listings of height and weight.; In these cases, the average was taken. ESPN grades are on a 100-point scale.; Sources: "Ohio State 2021 Basketball Commitments". Rivals.; "2021 Ohio State Buckeyes Recruiting Class". ESPN.; "2021 Team Ranking". Rivals.

== College career ==
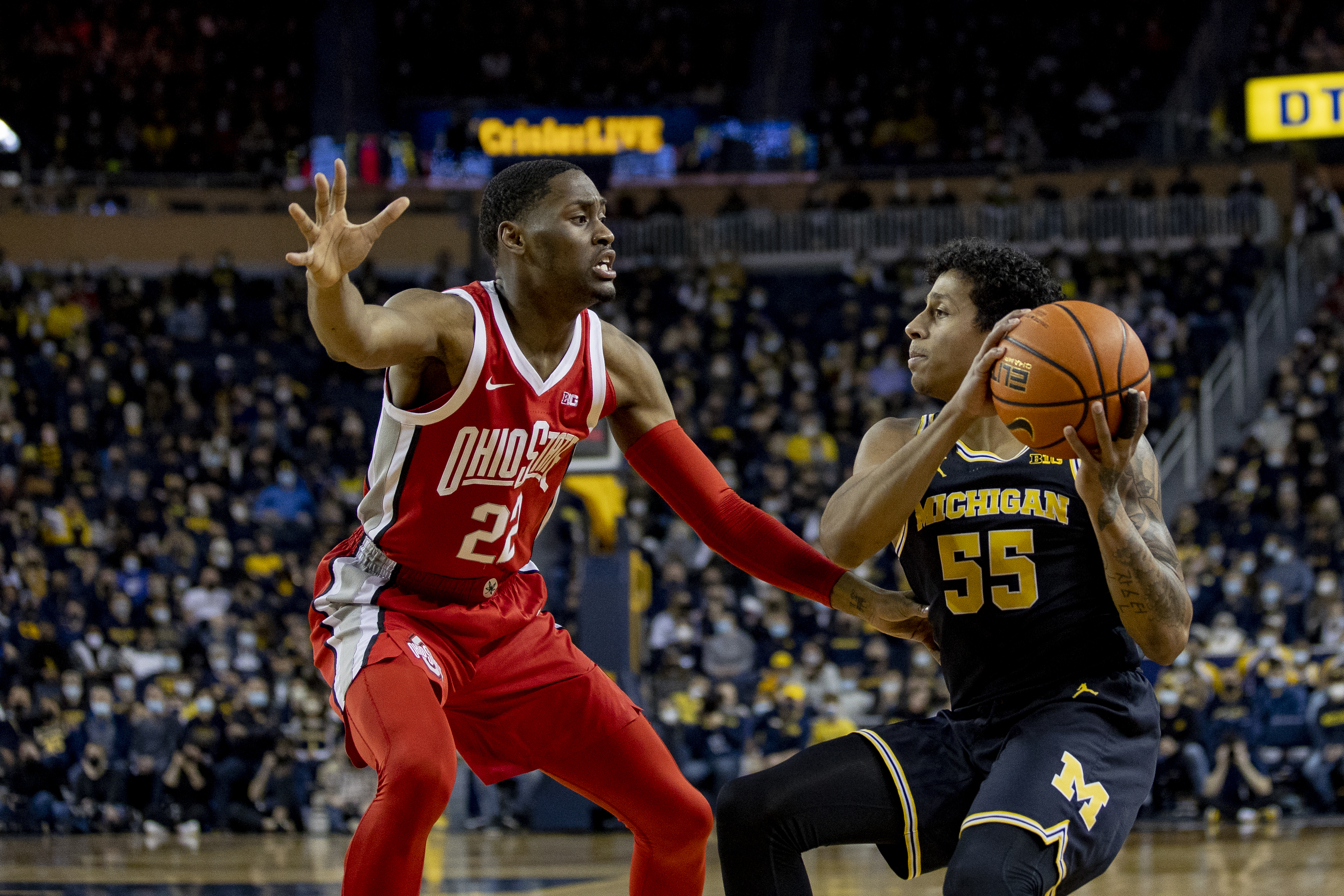
Branham guards Eli Brooks in 2022

Branham started his college career off the bench, but quickly became a regular starter. He scored a career-high 35 points in a 87–79 overtime win against Nebraska after a nearly month-long COVID pause. In a three-game stretch in February, he scored 22, 27 and 31 points. As a freshman, he averaged 13.7 points, 3.6 rebounds and two assists per game. Branham was named Big Ten Freshman of the Year as well as third-team All-Big Ten. On April 1, 2022, Branham declared for the 2022 NBA draft while maintaining his college eligibility. He later signed with an agent, forgoing his remaining eligibility. He was projected as a potential lottery pick in the draft.

== Professional career ==
=== San Antonio Spurs (2022–2025) ===
Branham was selected with the 20th overall pick by the San Antonio Spurs in the 2022 NBA draft. Branham joined the Spurs' 2022 NBA Summer League team. In his Summer League debut, Branham scored fifteen points in a 99–90 loss to the Cleveland Cavaliers. On July 8, 2022, Branham signed a rookie-scale contract with the Spurs. He made 66 total appearances (including 32 starts) for San Antonio during his rookie campaign, averaging 10.2 points, 2.7 rebounds, and 1.9 assists.

Branham played in 75 games (including 29 starts) for the Spurs during the 2023–24 NBA season, averaging 9.2 points, 2.0 rebounds, and 2.1 assists. He made 47 appearances off of the bench for San Antonio in the 2024–25 season, posting averages of 5.0 points, 1.1 rebounds, and 0.8 assists.

=== Washington Wizards (2025–2026) ===
On July 9, 2025, Branham and Blake Wesley were traded to the Washington Wizards in exchange for Kelly Olynyk. Branham made 28 appearances for Washington during the 2025–26 season, averaging 4.6 points, 1.6 rebounds, and 0.8 assists.

On February 5, 2026, Branham was traded to the Charlotte Hornets in a three-team trade involving the Dallas Mavericks. On February 9, Branham was waived by the Hornets.

=== Cleveland Charge (2026) ===
On March 9, 2026, Branham signed with the Cleveland Charge of the NBA G League.

=== Orlando Magic (2026) ===
On September 3, 2026, Branham signed an Exhibit 10 contract with the Orlando Magic.

== Career statistics ==
Legend
GP	Games played	GS	Games started	MPG	Minutes per game
FG%	Field goal percentage	3P%	3-point field goal percentage	FT%	Free throw percentage
RPG	Rebounds per game	APG	Assists per game	SPG	Steals per game
BPG	Blocks per game	PPG	Points per game	**Bold**	Career high

=== NBA ===
Year	Team	GP	GS	MPG	FG%	3P%	FT%	RPG	APG	SPG	BPG	PPG
2022–23	San Antonio	66	**32**	**23.5**	.440	.302	.829	**2.7**	1.9	**.5**	**.1**	**10.2**
2023–24	San Antonio	**75**	29	21.3	.432	.347	**.873**	2.0	**2.1**	.4	**.1**	9.2
2024–25	San Antonio	47	0	9.1	.458	**.405**	.818	1.1	.8	.2	.0	5.0
2025–26	Washington	28	0	9.8	**.473**	.378	.824	1.6	.8	.4	.1	4.6
Career		216	61	17.8	.441	.339	.840	2.0	1.6	.4	.1	8.0

=== College ===
Year	Team	GP	GS	MPG	FG%	3P%	FT%	RPG	APG	SPG	BPG	PPG
2021–22	Ohio State	32	31	29.6	.498	.416	.833	3.6	2.0	.7	.3	13.7
