= Zach Collins =

American basketball player (born 1997)

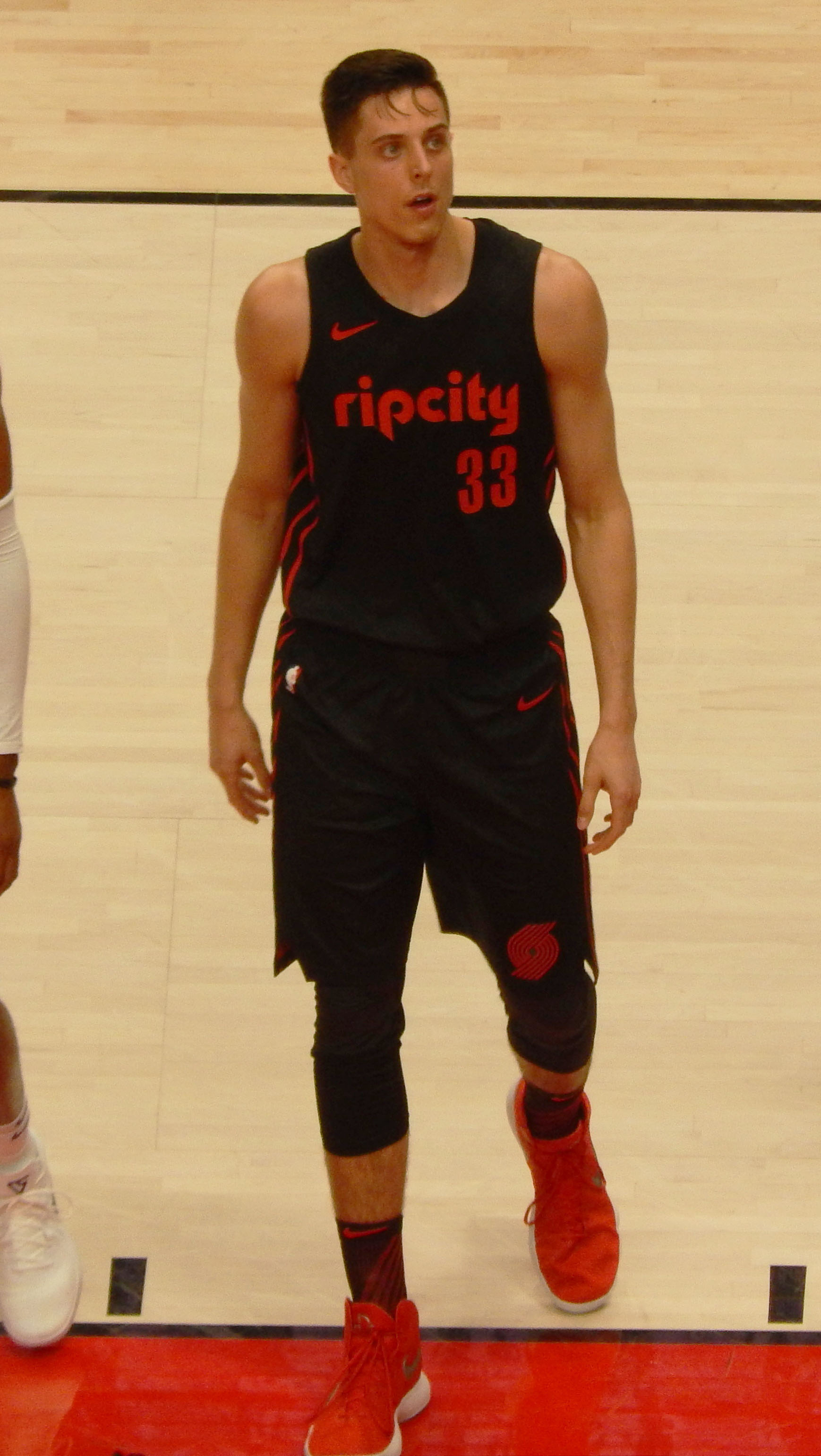
- Collins with the Portland Trail Blazers in 2018

No. 12 – Chicago Bulls
- Position: Center / power forward
- League: NBA

Personal information
- Born: November 19, 1997 (age 28) Las Vegas, Nevada, U.S.
- Listed height: 6 ft 9 in (2.06 m)
- Listed weight: 240 lb (109 kg)

Career information
- High school: Bishop Gorman (Summerlin, Nevada)
- College: Gonzaga (2016–2017)
- NBA draft: 2017: 1st round, 10th overall pick
- Drafted by: Sacramento Kings
- Playing career: 2017–present

Career history
- 2017–2021: Portland Trail Blazers
- 2021–2025: San Antonio Spurs
- 2022: →Austin Spurs
- 2025–present: Chicago Bulls

Career highlights
- Second-team All-WCC (2017); WCC All-Freshman Team (2017); McDonald's All-American (2016)
- Stats at NBA.com
- Stats at Basketball Reference

Zach Collins (born November 19, 1997) is an American professional basketball player for the Chicago Bulls of the National Basketball Association (NBA). He played college basketball for the Gonzaga Bulldogs. He was drafted by the Sacramento Kings with the 10th overall pick in the 2017 NBA draft and was traded to the Portland Trail Blazers on draft night. During his earlier career with the team he battled many injuries causing him to only play in 154 games in his first four seasons. He joined the San Antonio Spurs as a free agent in August 2021, where he played for four seasons before being traded to the Bulls in 2025.

== High school career ==
Collins played high school basketball at Bishop Gorman High School in Summerlin, Nevada, where he helped to lead his school to four consecutive state championships. For his first three seasons at Bishop Gorman, Collins came off the bench and played alongside fellow seven-footers and McDonald's All-Americans Stephen Zimmerman and Chase Jeter.

Collins had a productive senior year, averaging 17.3 points, 14 rebounds, 3.1 assists and 6.4 blocked shots on his way to the most valuable player of Nevada's Southwest League and the Nevada Gatorade Player of the Year award. Collins also broke Nevada's single-season record for most rebounds and blocked shots during his senior season.

In the summer of 2015, Collins competed in the FIBA 3x3 Under-18 World Championships, where he teamed up with Jalek Felton, Payton Pritchard and P. J. Washington and won the USA tournament. His team moved on to represent the US at the 2015 World Championship in Debrecen, Hungary, where they finished in eighth place. His team advanced to the final 16 where they defeated Poland, but then lost a close game to France, featuring fellow Gonzaga commit Killian Tillie, in the quarterfinals.

Despite being rated as a four-star prospect, Collins was named to the 2016 McDonald's All-American Game. Collins was the first McDonald's All-American to commit to Gonzaga out of high school, but three other McDonald's All-American transferred to Gonzaga after attending other colleges: Micah Downs, Kyle Wiltjer and Nigel Williams-Goss. Collins helped to lead the West squad to a 114–107 win in the while scoring nine points, along with six rebounds, three assists and two steals on 3-for-5 field goals and 1-for-2 three-pointers in 12 minutes of play.

=== Recruiting ===
In the winter of 2015, during Collins' junior year in high school, he took official visits to California, San Diego State, Utah, New Mexico and Gonzaga, as well as unofficial visits to UNLV. After his junior year, in March 2015, Collins committed to Gonzaga. He signed with the Zags in the early signing period as a key member of Gonzaga's highest-ranked recruiting class in school history.

College recruiting
Name	Hometown	School	Height	Weight	Commit date
Zach Collins; C	Las Vegas, NV	Bishop Gorman	7 ft 0 in (2.13 m)	230 lb (100 kg)	Mar 16, 2015
Zach Collins; C	Recruit ratings: Scout: Rivals: 247Sports: ESPN: (88)				
Overall recruit ranking: Scout: #38 Rivals: #21 247Sports: #20 ESPN: #37
Note: In many cases, Scout, Rivals, 247Sports, On3, and ESPN may conflict in their listings of height and weight.; In these cases, the average was taken. ESPN grades are on a 100-point scale.; Sources: "2016 Gonzaga Rivals Commits". Rivals.; "2016 Gonzaga Scout Commits". Scout.; "2016 Gonzaga ESPN Commits". ESPN.; "Scout.com Team Recruiting Rankings". Scout.; "2016 Team Ranking". Rivals.; "2016 Gonzaga 24/7 Sports Commits". 247Sports.

== College career ==
As a freshman at Gonzaga, Collins usually played off the bench as a center, working in rotation—and occasionally in tandem—with fifth-year senior center Przemek Karnowski. During the 2016–17 season, he averaged 10 points, 5.9 rebounds and 1.7 blocks over 17.3 minutes of playing time per game. In the national semifinal game of the 2017 NCAA Division I men's basketball tournament, Collins registered 14 points, 13 rebounds and six blocks, as the Bulldogs defeated South Carolina, 77–73, sending them to their first national championship game.

== Professional career ==
=== Portland Trail Blazers (2017–2021) ===
At the conclusion of his freshman season, Collins announced his intention to forgo his final three years of college eligibility and enter the 2017 NBA draft. He was drafted 10th overall by the Sacramento Kings and subsequently traded to the Portland Trail Blazers. On July 3, 2017, Collins signed with the Trail Blazers.

On November 5, 2019, the Trail Blazers announced that Collins had undergone successful surgery in repairing his left labrum and was expected to be sidelined for about four months. On December 30, 2020, the Trail Blazers announced that Collins had undergone successful surgery in repairing his left medial malleolus stress fracture, and as result he missed the entire season.

As he was recovering from his previous injury, Collins refractured his foot, and on June 29, 2021, the Trail Blazers announced that he underwent a second revision surgery to repair his left medial malleolus stress fracture. He did not appear in the playoffs as a result of the injury.

=== San Antonio / Austin Spurs (2021–2025) ===
On August 11, 2021, Collins signed a three-year, $22 million contract with the San Antonio Spurs. On January 16, 2022, he was assigned to the Austin Spurs of the NBA G League, while recovering from his ankle injury. On January 31, he was recalled. He made his Spurs debut February 4 against the Houston Rockets, scoring 10 points and grabbing seven rebounds.

On February 10, 2023, Collins scored 29 points and grabbed 11 rebounds during a 138–131 double-overtime loss against the Detroit Pistons. During the 2022–23 season, Collins improved his statistical averages, in total averaging nearly 12 points per game, three assists per game and shooting 52% from the field and 37% from three.

On October 22, 2023, Collins signed a two-year $35 million contract extension with the Spurs. He played in 69 games (starting 29) during the 2023–24 season for the Spurs, averaging 11.2 points, 5.4 rebounds and 2.8 assists. In the team's season finale on April 14, 2024, against the Detroit Pistons, Collins suffered a dislocated right shoulder. After an MRI revealed a torn labrum, he underwent surgery to repair to injury.

=== Chicago Bulls (2025–present) ===
On February 3, 2025, Collins, alongside Tre Jones and a 2025 first-round pick, was traded to the Chicago Bulls in a three team deal, in which they sent Sidy Cissoko, three first-round picks and two second-round picks to the Sacramento Kings. In 28 appearances (eight starts) for Chicago, he averaged 8.6 points, 6.7 rebounds, and 2.1 assists.

On October 18, 2025, it was announced that Collins would miss at least one month after suffering a non-displaced fracture in his left wrist. In 10 appearances prior to the injury, he averaged 9.7 points, 5.6 rebounds, and 1.5 assists. On February 21, 2026, the Bulls announced that Collins would require season-ending right toe surgery.

On June 30, 2026, Collins signed a two–year, $17 million contract to return to Chicago with a team option for the second year.

== Career statistics ==
Legend
GP	Games played	GS	Games started	MPG	Minutes per game
FG%	Field goal percentage	3P%	3-point field goal percentage	FT%	Free throw percentage
RPG	Rebounds per game	APG	Assists per game	SPG	Steals per game
BPG	Blocks per game	PPG	Points per game	**Bold**	Career high

=== NBA ===
==== Regular season ====
Year	Team	GP	GS	MPG	FG%	3P%	FT%	RPG	APG	SPG	BPG	PPG
2017–18	Portland	66	1	15.8	.398	.310	.643	3.3	.8	.3	.5	4.4
2018–19	Portland	**77**	0	17.6	.473	.331	.746	4.2	.9	.3	**.9**	6.6
2019–20	Portland	11	11	**26.4**	.471	.368	.750	6.3	1.5	.5	.5	7.0
2021–22	San Antonio	28	4	17.9	.490	.341	.800	5.5	2.2	.5	.8	7.8
2022–23	San Antonio	63	26	22.9	.518	.374	.761	6.4	**2.9**	**.6**	.8	**11.6**
2023–24	San Antonio	69	**29**	22.1	.484	.320	.753	5.4	2.8	.5	.8	11.2
2024–25	San Antonio	36	4	11.8	.462	.304	**.886**	2.8	1.4	.4	.4	4.6
2024–25	Chicago	28	8	19.7	.541	.300	.884	**6.7**	2.1	.5	.5	8.6
2025–26	Chicago	10	0	18.4	**.578**	**.429**	.700	5.6	1.5	.2	.4	9.7
Career		388	83	18.9	.485	.334	.765	4.9	1.8	.4	.7	8.0

==== Playoffs ====
Year	Team	GP	GS	MPG	FG%	3P%	FT%	RPG	APG	SPG	BPG	PPG
2018	Portland	4	0	**17.5**	.367	.214	.750	3.0	**1.5**	**.8**	.5	**7.0**
2019	Portland	**16**	0	17.2	**.506**	**.333**	**.800**	**3.6**	.9	.4	**1.4**	6.8
Career		20	0	17.3	.468	.286	.793	3.5	1.0	.5	1.2	6.9

=== College ===
Year	Team	GP	GS	MPG	FG%	3P%	FT%	RPG	APG	SPG	BPG	PPG
2016–17	Gonzaga	39	0	17.3	.652	.476	.743	5.9	.4	.5	1.8	10.0

== Honors and awards ==
- McDonald's All-American (2016)
- Nevada All-Southwest League MVP (2016)
- Nevada first-team All-Southwest League (2016)
- 4× Nevada Division I state championship titles (2013, 2014, 2015, 2016)
- NCAA All-Tournament Team (2017)
