= Karl-Anthony Towns =

American basketball player (born 1995)

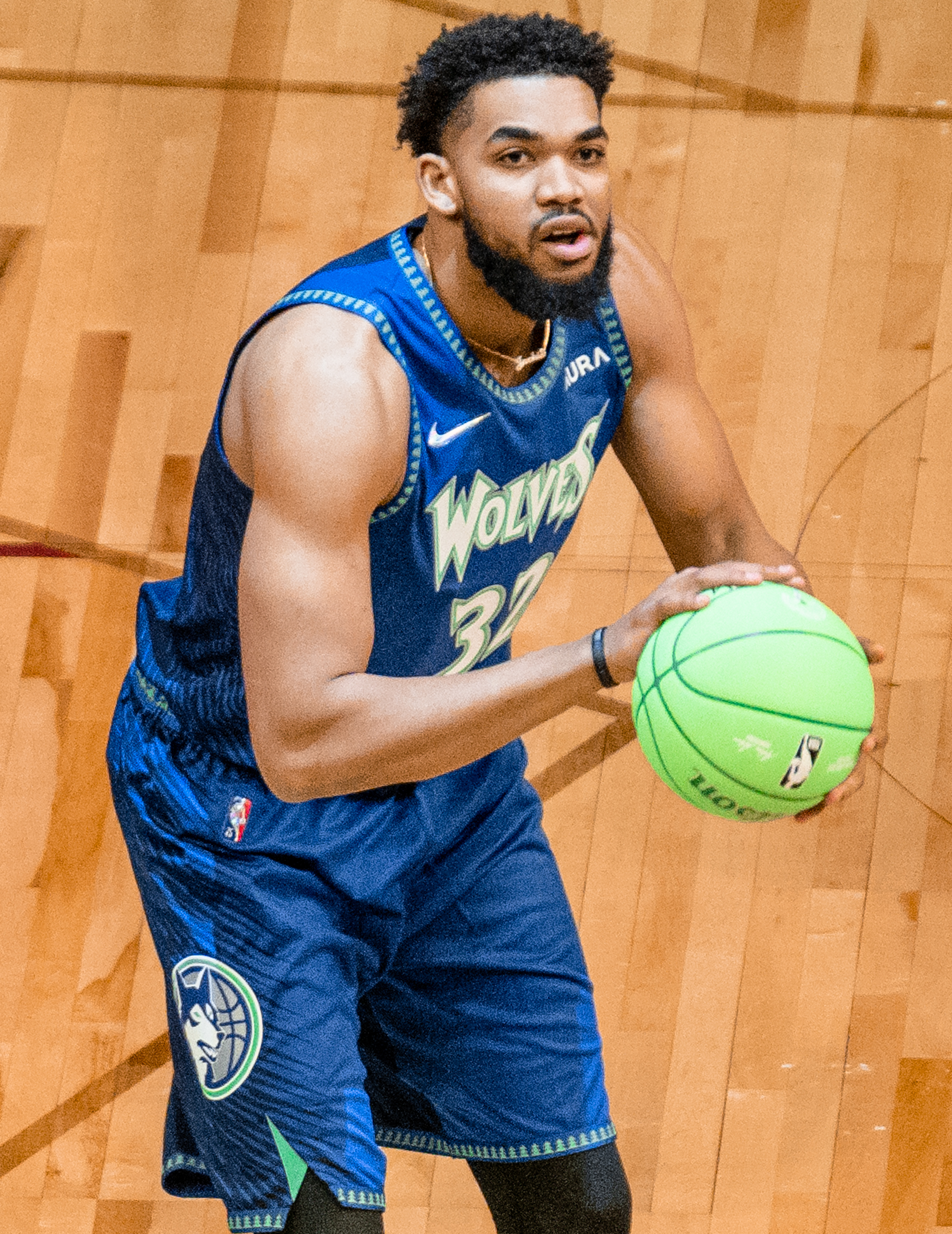
- Towns at the 2022 NBA All-Star Game

No. 32 – New York Knicks
- Position: Center / power forward
- League: NBA

Personal information
- Born: November 15, 1995 (age 31) Edison, New Jersey, U.S.
- Listed height: 7 ft 0 in (2.13 m)
- Listed weight: 248 lb (112 kg)

Career information
- High school: St. Joseph (Metuchen, New Jersey)
- College: Kentucky (2014–2015)
- NBA draft: 2015: 1st round, 1st overall pick
- Drafted by: Minnesota Timberwolves
- Playing career: 2015–present

Career history
- 2015–2024: Minnesota Timberwolves
- 2024–present: New York Knicks

Career highlights
- NBA champion (2026); 6× NBA All-Star (2018, 2019, 2022, 2024–2026); 3× All-NBA Third Team (2018, 2022, 2025); NBA Rookie of the Year (2016); NBA All-Rookie First Team (2016); NBA Three-Point Contest champion (2022); NBA Cup champion (2025); Consensus second-team All-American (2015); SEC Freshman of the Year (2015); First-team All-SEC (2015); Gatorade National Player of the Year (2014); McDonald's All-American (2014); First-team Parade All-American (2014)
- Stats at NBA.com
- Stats at Basketball Reference
Medals
Men's basketball
Representing Dominican Republic
Centrobasket
Gold medal – first place	2012 Puerto Rico	National Team

Karl-Anthony Towns Jr. (born November 15, 1995), also known by his initials KAT, is a Dominican American professional basketball player for the New York Knicks of the National Basketball Association (NBA). He was named to the Dominican Republic national team as a 16-year-old and played college basketball for the Kentucky Wildcats. He was selected with the first overall pick in the 2015 NBA draft by the Minnesota Timberwolves.

Towns was named the Rookie of the Year for the 2015–16 season. He is second on the Timberwolves' all-time scoring list. He led the team to the Western Conference finals in 2024, their first appearance in 20 years. After spending nine seasons with the Timberwolves, Towns was traded to the Knicks before the 2024–25 season. He was instrumental in helping the Knicks win the 2026 NBA Finals, their first championship win in 53 years. He is a six-time NBA All-Star, a three-time All-NBA Team member, and became the first center to win the NBA Three-Point Contest in 2022.

== Early life ==
Towns was born in Edison, New Jersey to an African-American father, Karl Towns Sr., and a Dominican mother, Jacqueline Cruz. He grew up in Piscataway, New Jersey, and attended Lake Nelson Seventh-Day Adventist School, before transferring to Theodore Schor Middle School from Our Lady of Fatima School in 2009. At Theodore Schor, he reclassified and repeated seventh grade in order to gain an extra year of development. Towns's father played basketball for Monmouth University and holds the University's record for total rebounds in a season with 319. He also coached basketball at Piscataway Technical High School, where the precocious Towns practiced with the junior varsity team as a fifth grader.

== High school career ==
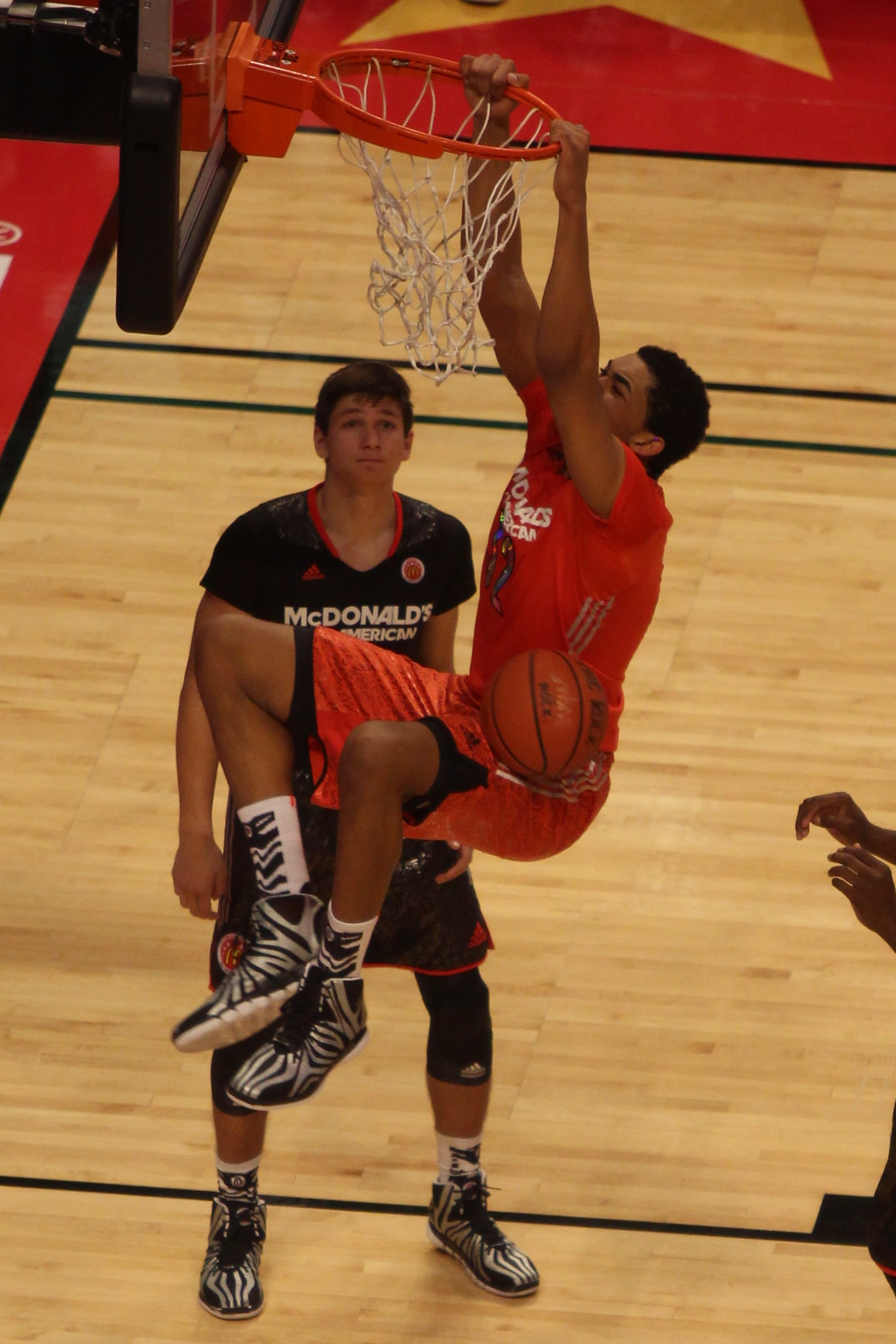
Towns dunking in the 2014 McDonald's All-American Boys Game

As a freshman at St. Joseph High School, Towns led the basketball team to a state championship in 2012, earning himself the top position in the ESPN 25 national ranking of high school players. He also led his team to state titles in 2013 and 2014. Towns was selected at the age of 16 to play on the Dominican Republic national basketball team, eligible due to his mother being from the Dominican Republic. John Calipari, head coach at the University of Kentucky and former NBA head coach, coached the team in the 2011 and 2012 competitions. They finished in third at the 2011 FIBA Americas Championship and fourth at the 2012 FIBA World Olympic Qualifying Tournament for Men, falling one position short of qualifying for the 2012 Olympics basketball tournament.

As a sophomore in December 2012, Towns announced that he was going to reclassify to the class of 2014, foregoing his fourth year of high school eligibility, and commit to play for the Kentucky Wildcats men's basketball team under Coach Calipari. ESPN, which had ranked him as the top prospect in the 2015 recruiting class, listed him as third-ranked in its 2014 class. Towns graduated from high school with a 3.96 GPA on a 4.5 scale. He was named the 2014 Gatorade Player of the Year.

On January 6, 2013, Towns recorded a quadruple-double with 16 points, 17 rebounds, 11 blocks and 11 assists. He recorded a second quadruple-double on January 5, 2014, with 20 points, 14 rebounds, 12 blocks and 10 assists. Towns averaged 20.9 points, 13.4 rebounds and 6.2 blocks per game as a senior.

College recruiting
Name	Hometown	School	Height	Weight	Commit date
Karl-Anthony Towns; C	Metuchen, New Jersey	St. Joseph	6 ft 11 in (2.11 m)	235 lb (107 kg)	Dec 4, 2012
Karl-Anthony Towns; C	Recruit ratings: Scout: Rivals: 247Sports: ESPN:				
Overall recruit ranking: Scout: 4, 2 (C) Rivals: 5 ESPN: 9, 1 (NJ), 3 (C)
Note: In many cases, Scout, Rivals, 247Sports, On3, and ESPN may conflict in their listings of height and weight.; In these cases, the average was taken. ESPN grades are on a 100-point scale.; Sources: "Kentucky 2014 Basketball Commitments". Rivals.; "2014 Kentucky Basketball Commits". Scout.; "ESPN". ESPN.; "Scout.com Team Recruiting Rankings". Scout.; "2014 Team Ranking". Rivals.

== College career ==
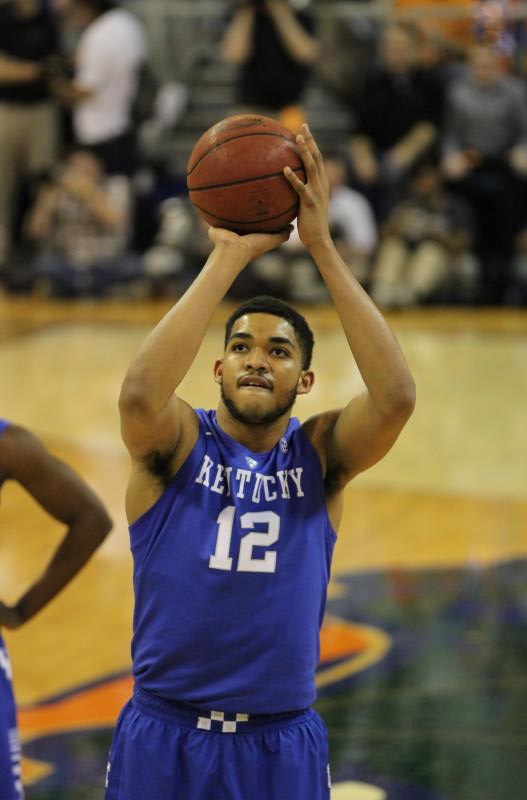
Towns shooting a free throw against the Florida Gators in 2015

In his freshman year, Kentucky used a unique "platoon system" that limited the minutes of each player, and he subsequently averaged 10.3 points and 6.7 rebounds in 21.1 minutes per game. He studied kinesiology in his one year at Kentucky, and hopes to become a doctor after his basketball career. Though he left Kentucky for the NBA, Towns enrolled in online courses, and hopes to earn his degree. He was named a second-team All-American by the Associated Press and NABC, and a third-team All-American by The Sporting News. Throughout the 2014–15 season, Towns was often ranked behind Duke center Jahlil Okafor as a draft prospect. However, due to strong play in the NCAA Tournament, and a growing consensus that Towns was a better defensive player and had an opportunity to become a better offensive player as well, Towns overtook Okafor in most draft rankings.

On April 9, 2015, Towns and fellow Kentucky teammates Andrew Harrison, Aaron Harrison, Dakari Johnson, Devin Booker, Trey Lyles and Willie Cauley-Stein, all declared for the 2015 NBA draft.

== Professional career ==
=== Minnesota Timberwolves (2015–2024) ===
==== Rookie of the Year (2015–2016) ====
On June 25, 2015, Towns was selected by the Minnesota Timberwolves with the first overall pick in the 2015 NBA draft. He signed his rookie scale contract with the Timberwolves on July 7, and made his NBA debut in the Timberwolves' season opener against the Los Angeles Lakers on October 28, recording 14 points and 12 rebounds as a starter in a 112–111 win. In the following game on October 30 against the Denver Nuggets, his 28 points and 14 rebounds propelled the Timberwolves to their first 2–0 start with two wins on the road in team history. Over his first 13 games of the season, Towns averaged 16.0 points and 10.4 rebounds per game. Those numbers dropped, however, to 8.4 points and 6.0 rebounds over the next five games. Despite this, on December 3, he was named Western Conference Rookie of the Month for November, becoming just the seventh Timberwolves player to win NBA Rookie of the Month honors.

On January 20, 2016, Towns had a season-best game with 27 points and career highs of 17 rebounds and six blocks in a 106–94 loss to the Dallas Mavericks. On January 29, he recorded 32 points and 12 rebounds in a loss to the Utah Jazz, becoming the youngest player to have 30 points and 10 rebounds in a game since Kevin Durant did so in 2008. On February 2, he was named Western Conference Rookie of the Month for January—his third consecutive rookie of the month honor. On February 10, he scored a then career-high 35 points in a 117–112 win over the Toronto Raptors. Three days later, he won the 2016 NBA All-Star Weekend Skills Challenge over point guard Isaiah Thomas, becoming the tallest, heaviest, and youngest winner of the event. On March 3, named Western Conference Rookie of the Month for February, joining teammate Andrew Wiggins (November, December 2014, January, February 2015) as the second player in Wolves history to earn NBA Rookie of the Month honors in four consecutive months.

On March 25, Towns grabbed 10 rebounds against the Washington Wizards, setting a Minnesota rookie rebounding record, pushing his season total to 741 and passing Kevin Love's record of 734. On April 7, he recorded his 50th double-double of the season with 17 points and 10 rebounds in a 105–97 win over the Sacramento Kings. Four days later, in a loss to the Houston Rockets, Towns passed Christian Laettner for the franchise's rookie scoring record with 1,475 points. Earlier that day, he was named Western Conference Player of the Week for games played Monday, April 4 through Sunday, April 10. Towns played and started in all 82 games for the Timberwolves in 2015–16, averaging 18.3 points and 10.5 rebounds per game; he subsequently earned unanimous NBA Rookie of the Year honors. Towns earned Western Conference Rookie of the Month honors in each of the season's six months, becoming the first Timberwolves player to do so. In addition, he became just the fifth unanimous NBA Rookie of the Year, and with teammate Andrew Wiggins winning the award in 2014–15, Minnesota became the first team with back-to-back Rookie of the Year winners since the Buffalo Braves in 1972–73 (Bob McAdoo) and 1973–74 (Ernie DiGregorio), as well as the first team with back-to-back No. 1 draft picks earning Rookie of the Year honors. He also earned NBA All-Rookie First Team honors.

==== Improving as a sophomore (2016–2017) ====
On November 30, 2016, Towns recorded a then career-high 47 points and 18 rebounds in a 106–104 loss to the New York Knicks. At 21 years old, Towns became the third-youngest player in the last three decades to have at least 45 points and 15 rebounds in a game. In addition, his 22 first-quarter points were two off of Chauncey Billups' franchise record of 24. With two blocks against the Charlotte Hornets on December 3, Towns established a new Timberwolves record with his 27th straight game with at least one blocked shot. On December 28, he recorded his first career triple-double with 15 points, 11 rebounds and 10 assists in a 105–103 loss to the Denver Nuggets. On March 8, 2017, he had 29 points and 14 rebounds in a 107–91 win over the Los Angeles Clippers. Towns had his 100th career double-double in the win, becoming the second-youngest player in league history to reach that mark, behind only Dwight Howard. Five days later, he was named Western Conference Player of the Week for games played Monday, March 6 through Sunday, March 12. On April 11, 2017, he had 26 points and 12 rebounds in a 100–98 loss to the Oklahoma City Thunder. Towns surpassed Kevin Love during the game to set a franchise record for points in a season. Towns made NBA history in 2016–17 by becoming the only player to have at least 2,000 points (2,061), 1,000 rebounds (1,007) and 100 3-pointers (101) in a season.

==== First All-Star and All-NBA appearances (2017–2018) ====
On November 15, 2017, Towns had 26 points and 16 rebounds for Minnesota on the night he turned 22, helping the Timberwolves end a 12-game losing streak to the San Antonio Spurs with a 98–86 victory. Towns finished in the top 10 in almost every statistical category in NBA history compiled prior to the player's 22nd birthday. He ranked eighth in points, third in rebounds and second in double-doubles (124), trailing only Dwight Howard (169). Towns subsequently earned Western Conference Player of the Week honors for games played from Monday, November 13 through Sunday, November 19. On December 14, 2017, against the Sacramento Kings, Towns had 30 points, 14 rebounds, five assists and five blocks, joining Kevin Garnett as the only Wolves players to collect 30+ points, 10+ rebounds, 5+ assists and 5+ blocks in a single game. On December 31, 2017, he had 18 points, 14 rebounds and a career high-tying six blocks in a 107–90 win over the Indiana Pacers. On January 5, 2018, he recorded 25 points and a then career-high 23 rebounds in a 91–84 loss to the Boston Celtics. On January 23, 2018, Towns was named a Western Conference All-Star reserve. On March 20, 2018, he recorded his NBA-best 60th double-double with 30 points and 10 rebounds in a 123–109 win over the Los Angeles Clippers. On March 28, 2018, he scored a franchise-record 56 points and added 15 rebounds for his league-leading 63rd double-double, as the Timberwolves beat the Atlanta Hawks 126–114. The 56 points surpassed Mo Williams' franchise record of 52 points set on January 13, 2015, against the Indiana Pacers. He also became the youngest player (22 years, 133 days) with 50 points and 15 rebounds in a game since Shaquille O'Neal (22 years, 45 days) on April 20, 1994, against the Timberwolves. In the Timberwolves' regular season finale on April 11, 2018, Towns had 26 points and 14 rebounds in a 112–106 overtime win over the Denver Nuggets. The win clinched Minnesota a spot in the playoffs for the first time since 2004—no team in the league had gone longer without a postseason appearance than the Timberwolves. It was the first final-day play-in game in the NBA in 21 years, with Denver also vying for a spot in the playoffs. Towns finished the season with 68 double-doubles, the most in the NBA. In Game 3 of the Timberwolves' first-round playoff series against the Houston Rockets, Towns recorded 18 points and 16 rebounds in a 121–105 win. The Timberwolves went on to lose the series in five games, despite Towns recording 23 points and 14 rebounds in a 122–104 loss in Game 5.

==== Franchise player (2018–2019) ====
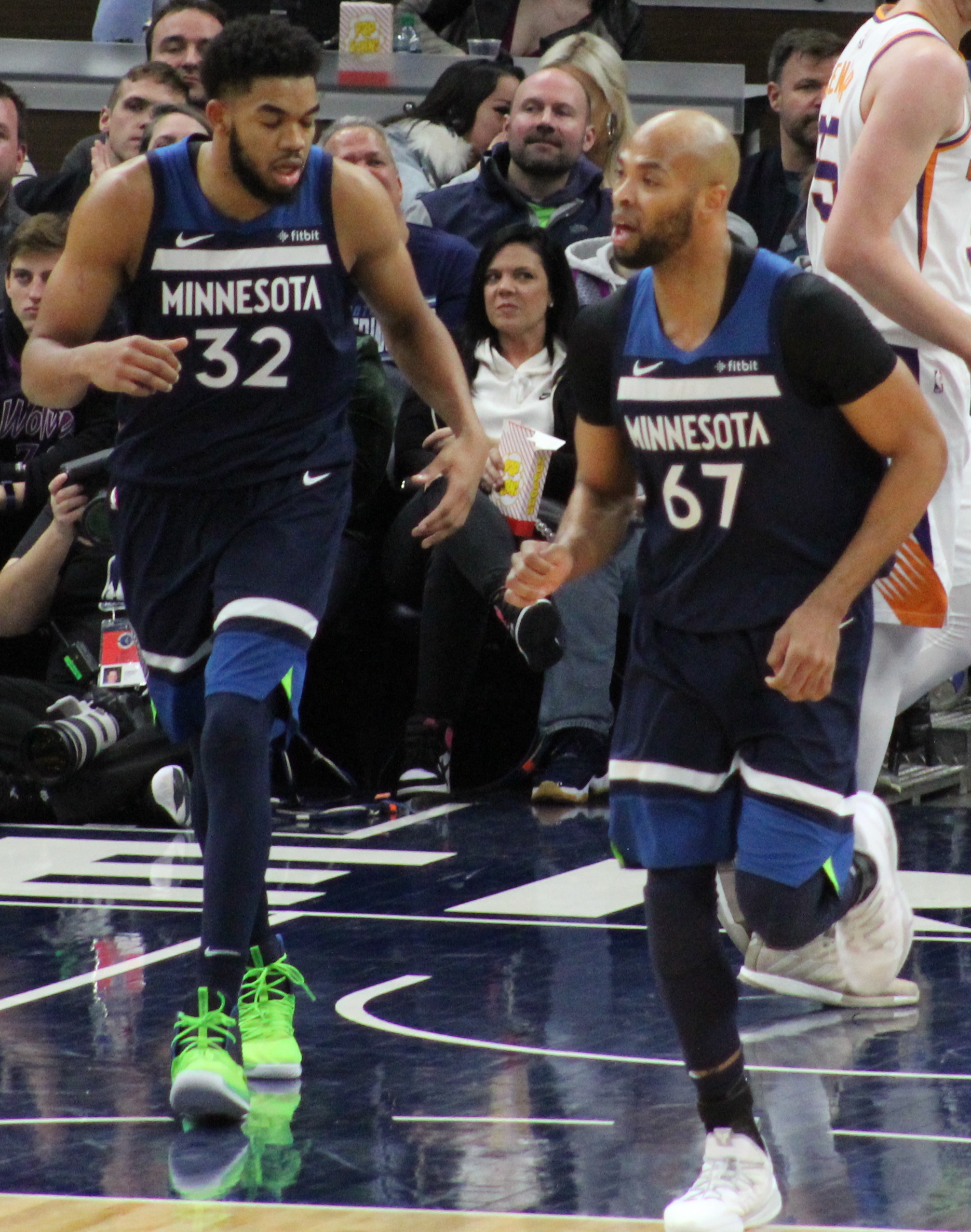
Towns (left) and Taj Gibson in 2019

On September 23, 2018, Towns signed a five-year, $158 million super-maximum extension with the Timberwolves. On November 9, he had a season-high 39 points and 19 rebounds in a 121–110 loss to the Sacramento Kings. On November 12, he had 25 points and a then season-high 21 rebounds in a 120–113 win over the Brooklyn Nets. On December 5, Towns recorded 35 points, 12 rebounds and tied a career high with six blocks in a 121–104 win over the Charlotte Hornets. On January 12, 2019, he recorded 27 points and a career-high 27 rebounds in a 110–106 win over the New Orleans Pelicans. On January 30, he scored all 16 of his points after halftime, including a buzzer-beating desperation shot in overtime to lift the Timberwolves over the Memphis Grizzlies 99–97. Towns missed the first game of his career on February 22 against the New York Knicks after being placed in the concussion protocol following a car accident in Minnesota. He had registered 303 consecutive starts, the longest to begin a career since 1970–71. The concussion protocol forced him to miss a second game, with his return on February 25 seeing him record 34 points and 21 rebounds in a 112–105 win over the Kings. On March 5, Towns had 41 points and 14 rebounds in a 131–120 win over the Oklahoma City Thunder, thus moving into fifth place on Minnesota's career scoring list, passing Wally Szczerbiak (6,777 points). Towns finished the season with the highest rebounding average of his career to date, at 12.4 rebounds per game.

==== Injuries and health problems (2019–2021) ====
On October 23, 2019, in the first game of Minnesota's season, Towns scored 36 points, grabbed 14 rebounds, blocked 3 shots, and recorded 3 steals in a 127–126 win over the Brooklyn Nets. On October 31, Towns was suspended for two games without pay due to an altercation with Joel Embiid during a game against the Philadelphia 76ers. Towns finished the season with the highest scoring average of his career to date, at 26.5 points per game.

On December 27, 2020, Towns joined Hall-of-Famers Kareem Abdul-Jabbar, Tim Duncan, Elgin Baylor and David Robinson as the only players in NBA history to accumulate over 8,000 points, 4,000 rebounds and 1,000 assists in 360 games or less. In mid-January 2021, Towns contracted COVID-19 and missed 13 games. He returned to the court on February 10, recording 18 points and ten rebounds in a loss to the Los Angeles Clippers. On February 23, Towns had a career-high 11 assists along with 26 points and 8 rebounds in a 139–112 loss against the Milwaukee Bucks. On March 17, Towns scored a season-high 41 points, along with 10 rebounds and 8 assists in a 123–119 victory over the Phoenix Suns. In the same game his teammate Anthony Edwards scored a career-high 42 points and it was just the second time in Timberwolves franchise history that two players scored 40 points in the same game.

==== Three-Point contest champion (2021–2022) ====
On January 9, 2022, Towns scored a then season-high 40 points, along with nine rebounds and seven assists, in a 141–123 victory over the Houston Rockets. On February 3, Towns was named a reserve for the 2022 NBA All-Star Game. On February 19, Towns won the Mountain Dew NBA Three-Point contest in Cleveland, defeating Luke Kennard and Trae Young in the final round; in doing so, he became the first center to win the contest. On March 5, a 138–101 win over the Oklahoma City Thunder, Towns recorded 36 points, 15 rebounds, five assists, three blocks, and zero turnovers. he became the first player in NBA history to record such a stat line while shooting at least 75 percent from the field in the same game, joined Tim Duncan as the only players to record these numbers in a game since 1980 (the start of the three-point era), with the exception of turnovers. On March 7, Towns was named Western Conference player of the week after leading Minnesota to a perfect 4–0 record.

On March 14, Towns recorded a then career-high and then Timberwolves franchise-record 60 points, 32 of which in the third quarter and grabbed 17 rebounds in a 149–139 win over the San Antonio Spurs. He was also efficient in doing so, shooting 19-of-31 from the field, including 7-of-11 from beyond the arc. Towns became the first player in Timberwolves franchise history with multiple 50-plus point, 10-plus rebound games. He also joined Shaquille O'Neal and Wilt Chamberlain as the only centers in NBA history to have a 60-point, 15-rebound outing. Towns entered the fourth quarter with 56 points and 14 boards to join Carmelo Anthony as the only two players in the last 20 seasons with 50 or more points and 10 or more rebounds through three quarters. On April 16, in Game 1 of the first round of the playoffs, Towns logged 29 points and 13 rebounds in a 130–117 win over the Memphis Grizzlies. On April 23, Towns recorded a career playoff-best 33 points and 14 rebounds in a 119–118 Game 4 win. Minnesota would go on to lose to Memphis in six games.

==== Injury and comeback (2022–2024) ====
On July 7, 2022, Towns signed a four-year, $224 million contract extension.

On November 28, 2022, during Minnesota's 142–127 loss to the Washington Wizards, Towns exited in the third quarter with a non-contact calf injury. The next day, the Timberwolves announced that he would be sidelined indefinitely with a right calf strain. Although sources reported the injury as a Grade 2 strain and stated that Towns would miss around four-to-six weeks of action, he later stated in January 2023 that he had suffered a Grade 3 strain, which take around two months to heal. On April 9, in the final game of the 2022–23 season, Towns recorded 30 points and 8 rebounds to help lead the Timberwolves to a 113–108 win over the New Orleans Pelicans, earning the eight seed in the Western Conference play-in tournament. In the First Round, Timberwolves were eliminated from the playoffs by the eventual NBA champion Nuggets despite a 26-point and 11-rebound performance by Towns in the close-out Game 5 defeat.

On November 18, 2023, Towns put up 29 points on 10-of-11 shooting from the field along with six rebounds, nine assists, two blocks, and a game-winning lay-up in a 121–120 win over the New Orleans Pelicans. On December 16, Towns scored a season-high 40 points and grabbed 12 rebounds in a 127–109 win over the Indiana Pacers. On January 22, 2024, Towns put up a career-high and Timberwolves franchise-record 62 points, with 44 of those coming in the first half, in a 128–125 loss to the Charlotte Hornets. His 44 points set a record for the most points scored in a half in Timberwolves franchise history. On February 1, he was named to his fourth All-Star Game as a Western Conference reserve. During the 2024 All-Star Game, Towns became the fourth player in NBA history to record 50 or more points in the All-Star Game and the first player to record 30 or more points in one quarter in an All-Star Game, recording a statline of 50 points, 8 rebounds, and 3 assists in a loss to the East. On March 7, Towns was diagnosed with a torn left meniscus, leaving him out indefinitely.

In game 4 of the first round of the playoffs, Towns scored 28 points and grabbed 10 rebounds in a 122–116 win over the Phoenix Suns to close out the series. It was the franchise's first playoff series win in 20 years. In Game 7 of the Western Conference Semifinals, Towns recorded 23 points and 12 rebounds to help lead the Timberwolves to a 98–90 victory over the Denver Nuggets. They advanced to the Western Conference Finals for the first time in exactly 20 years. Minnesota would go on to lose in the Western Conference Finals to the Dallas Mavericks in five games despite Towns 28-point and 12-rebound outing in a 124–103 close-out loss in Game 5.

=== New York Knicks (2024–present) ===
==== 2024–25 season: Eastern Conference Finals appearance ====
On October 2, 2024, Towns was traded to the New York Knicks as part of a three-team trade with the Charlotte Hornets. Along with Towns, the Knicks acquired the draft rights to James Nnaji from the Charlotte Hornets. The price was steep: The Knicks sent Julius Randle, Donte DiVincenzo, Keita Bates-Diop and a future first-round pick to Minnesota, and Charlie Brown, DaQuan Jeffries, Duane Washington Jr. and two future second-round picks to Charlotte.

On October 29, Towns posted 44 points and 13 rebounds in a 116–107 win over the Miami Heat. He was 17-of-25 from the field, 4-for-5 from 3-point range, and 6-for-6 from the free-throw line. The 44 points also were the most in a game by a Knicks center since Patrick Ewing in 1995. Towns also became the first player in Knicks franchise history with 40 points, 10 rebounds and 65% shooting in a game since Carmelo Anthony in 2014. On November 13, Towns scored a season-high 46 points on 60% shooting from the field and grabbed 10 rebounds in a 124–123 loss against the Chicago Bulls. On December 19, In his first game back at Target Center after a nine-year tenure with the Timberwolves, Towns recorded 32 points, 20 rebounds and six assists in a 133–107 victory. With the performance, he joined Kareem Abdul-Jabbar (1975 vs. Milwaukee Bucks) as the only players to record 30+ points and 20+ boards in their first game back against their former team. Towns also joined Willis Reed as the only Knicks with a 30/20 game on 80% shooting. For his play in December, Towns was named Eastern Conference Player of the Month for the first time in his career. He helped lead the Knicks to a 12–2 record in December, averaging 23.2 points, 14.6 rebounds, and 1.8 blocks per game.

On January 25, 2025, Towns was named as an Eastern Conference starter for the 2025 NBA All-Star Game. On February 12, Towns scored 44 points and grabbed 10 rebounds in a 149–148 overtime win over the Atlanta Hawks. He recorded 40 points in consecutive games for the first time in his career. Towns also joined Patrick Ewing, Bernard King, Carmelo Anthony and Jalen Brunson as the only Knicks players with at least 40 points in consecutive games. On March 25, Towns put up his first triple-double as a Knick with 26 points, 12 rebounds, and 11 assists in a 128–113 win over the Dallas Mavericks.

In Game 1 of the Eastern Conference finals, Towns delivered a playoff career-high 35 points along with 12 rebounds, though the Knicks fell short in a 138–135 overtime loss to the Indiana Pacers. In Game 3 of the Eastern Conference finals, Towns scored 20 of his 24 points in the fourth quarter, grabbed 15 rebounds, and helped lead the Knicks to a 106–100 comeback win over the Pacers, after trailing by as many as 20 points. He also became just the second Knick in the play-by-play era to score 20 or more points in the fourth quarter of a postseason game, the first being Jalen Brunson. The Knicks would go on to lose to the Pacers in six games, despite Towns's 22-point and 14-rebound outing in a 125–108 close-out loss in Game 6.

==== 2025–26 season: NBA Cup champion and NBA champion ====
On June 4, 2025, it was announced that Towns had undergone treatment for a bruised left knee, and surgery to repair ligament damage in his left finger.

On November 3, 2025, Towns recorded 33 points, 13 rebounds and five assists in a 119–102 win over the Washington Wizards. He became only the 6th player in NBA history to reach 15,000 points, 7,000 rebounds, and 2,000 assists before the age of 30, joining Kareem Abdul-Jabbar, Charles Barkley, Kevin Garnett, Giannis Antetokounmpo, and Nikola Jokić. Towns also became the youngest player in NBA history to record 15,000+ points, 7,000+ rebounds, and 1,000+ three-pointers, reaching the milestone almost a year younger than the previous record holder, Dirk Nowitzki. On December 16, 2025, Towns posted 16 points and 11 rebounds to help the Knicks secure a 124–113 victory over the San Antonio Spurs in the NBA Cup Final, earning selection to the All-Tournament Team. On December 23, Towns scored a season-high 40 points and grabbed 13 rebounds in the Knicks’ 115–104 loss to his former team, the Minnesota Timberwolves. On February 1, 2026, Towns was named to his sixth All-Star Game as an Eastern Conference reserve. On April 1, Towns recorded his fourth career triple-double, and second as a Knick, finishing with 20 points, 11 rebounds, and 11 assists in a 130–119 win over the Memphis Grizzlies.

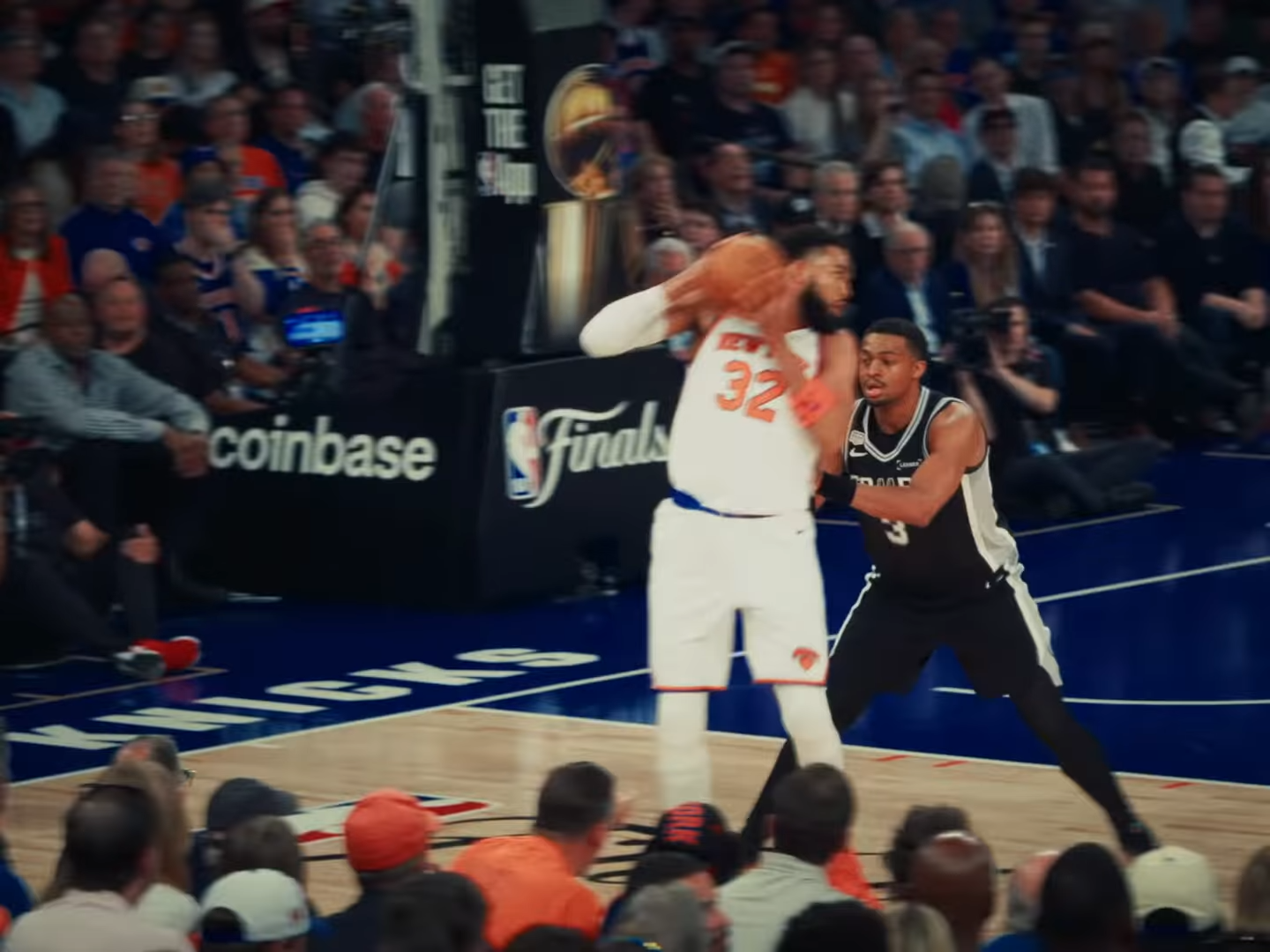
Towns being guarded by Keldon Johnson during Game 3 of the 2026 NBA Finals

In Game 4 of the Eastern Conference First Round against the Atlanta Hawks, Towns recorded his first playoff triple-double with 20 points, 10 rebounds, and 10 assists in a 114–98 win. He became the fourth Knicks player to record a postseason triple-double, joining Walt Frazier, Dick McGuire, and Josh Hart. In Game 6, Towns had his second playoff triple-double with 12 points, 11 rebounds, and 10 assists, helping lead the Knicks to a 142–91 win and a spot in the Eastern Conference semifinals. He became just the second player in franchise history, joining Walt Frazier, to post two triple-doubles in a single playoff series. In the Eastern Conference semifinals, the Knicks swept the Philadelphia 76ers as Towns emerged as a primary facilitator in New York's offense, leading the team with 7.5 assists per game during the series. In Game 4 of the Eastern Conference Finals, Towns put up 19 points and 14 rebounds as the Knicks swept the Cleveland Cavaliers and advanced to the 2026 NBA Finals and their first finals appearance since 1999.

On June 3, in Game 1 of the NBA Finals, Towns recorded 18 points, 12 rebounds, and four assists in the Knicks' 105–95 victory over the San Antonio Spurs. He also played a significant defensive role, helping limit Victor Wembanyama to 6-of-21 shooting from the field, including a 2-of-12 mark with Towns as the primary defender, as New York overcame a 14-point second-half deficit to take a 1–0 lead in the series. In Game 2, Towns posted 21 points, 13 rebounds, and four assists in the Knicks' 105–104 win over Spurs. He became the first Knick with a 20-point double-double in an NBA Finals road game since Dave DeBusschere in 1973 His performance helped New York secure a 2–0 series lead. The victory made the Knicks just the third team in NBA Finals history to win the first two games of a Finals series on the road, joining the 1993 Chicago Bulls and 1995 Houston Rockets. The Knicks also achieved their 13th straight postseason victory in a single playoff run, the second-longest streak in NBA history behind the 2017 Golden State Warriors. In Game 5, Towns helped the Knicks achieve a 94–90 win and close out the NBA Finals against the Spurs, 4–1, securing the Knicks' first NBA championship in 53 years. During the 2026 NBA playoffs, Towns established the NBA single-postseason record for total plus–minus with a +258, surpassing Steph Curry (+245, 2017) for a Knicks team that averaged an NBA playoff record +14.9 margin of victory.

== National team ==
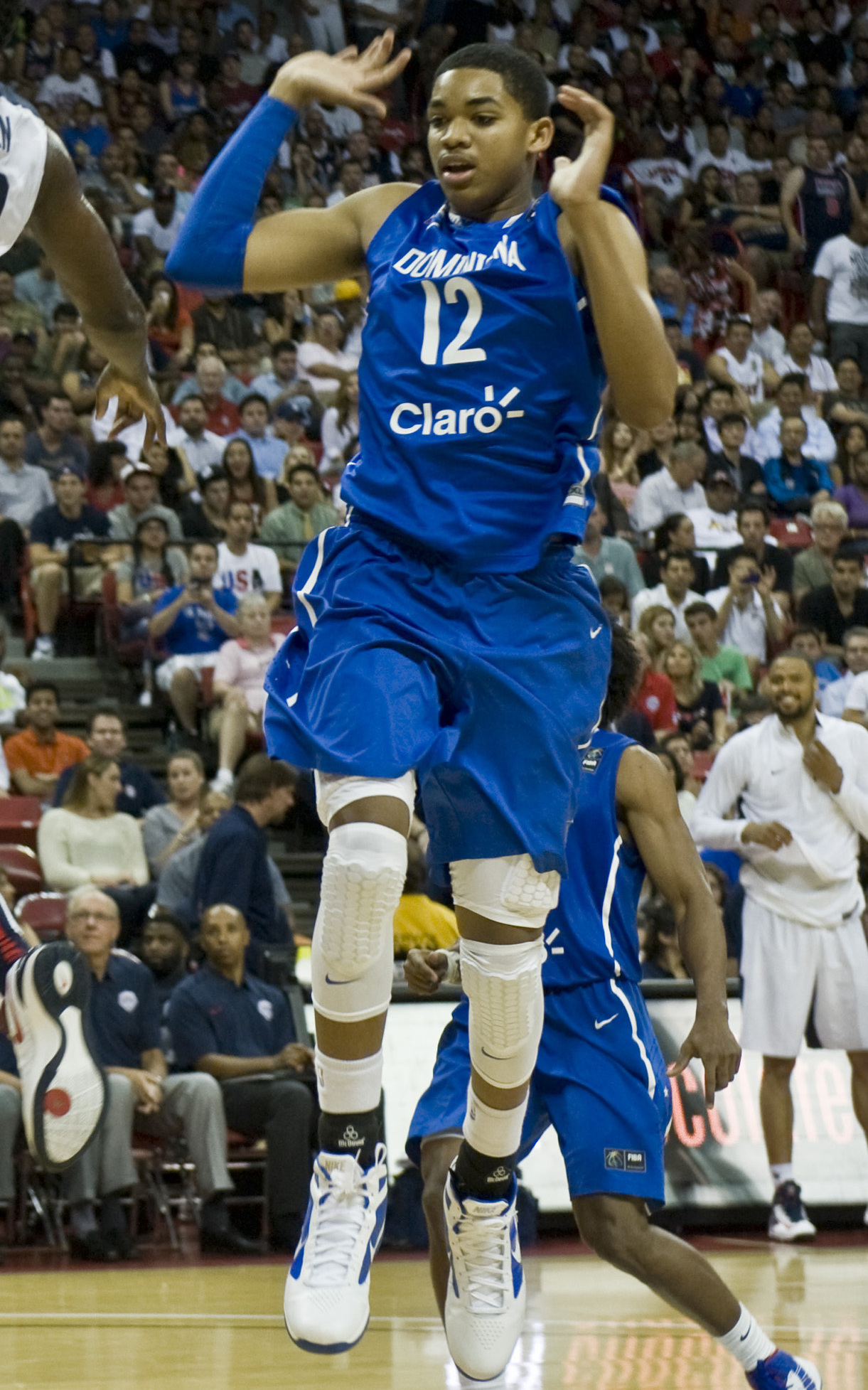
Towns representing the Dominican Republic in a 2012 exhibition at 16 years old

Towns has represented the Dominican Republic national team internationally since 2012. He debuted for them at the 2012 Centrobasket, when he was age 16. He would not play for the Dominican national team in the following years, until he joined them for the 2023 FIBA Basketball World Cup, confirming his presence in July 2023. He averaged 24.4 points, fifth-most in the tournament, as well as 8 rebounds over five games.

== Player profile ==
Despite playing most of his career at center, Towns is known for being an exceptional 3-point shooter, averaging nearly 40% from the arc over his career. His career three point field goal percentage is the highest among all players listed at 7 ft 0 in (2.13 m) or higher. He and Dirk Nowitzki are the only 7-footers to ever win the NBA Three-Point Contest. The two are often cited as among the best big men shooters in NBA history.

The Ringer has called him "a singular presence… Bigs who can shoot like Towns (to the extent they can) are almost never as physical and competitive on the glass as he is." His flexibility and shooting have allowed him to slot in at power forward alongside more traditional bigs like Rudy Gobert in Minnesota.

A three-level scorer, Towns ranked 7th in the NBA with 1.21 points per direct drive during the 2024–25 season. He also excels working in pick-and-pop sets, daring defenders to leave him isolated on the 3-point line.

While his offensive versatility makes him a unique weapon in the modern NBA, his defensive limitations have been noted throughout his career. Despite being a consistently elite rebounder (11.1 per game in his career), Towns is often derided for his post defense. Some, like Jim Souhan of the Star Tribune, have speculated that his lack of rim protection spurred the Timberwolves to trade for 4x DPOY Gobert in 2022. According to The Athletic, New York Knicks coaches and players were frustrated by Towns's defensive habits throughout the 2024–25 NBA season. The frustration was caused by Towns's defensive process and execution of incorrect coverages without communicating his reasoning.

== Other media ==
=== WWE ===
On July 18, 2026, at Saturday Night's Main Event XLV, Towns came out of Danhausen's cloning machine to help him defeat JD McDonagh (who was accompanied by Dominik Mysterio) by pinfall in a No Disqualification match.

== Awards and honors ==
NBA

- NBA champion: 2026
- 6× NBA All-Star: 2018, 2019, 2022, 2024–2026
- 3× All-NBA Third Team: 2018, 2022, 2025
- NBA Cup champion: 2025
- NBA Cup All-Tournament Team: 2025
- NBA Rookie of the Year: 2016
- NBA All-Rookie First Team: 2016
- NBA Three-Point Contest champion: 2022

NCAA

- Consensus second-team All-American: 2015
- SEC Freshman of the Year: 2015
- First-team All-SEC: 2015

High school

- Gatorade National Player of the Year: 2014
- McDonald's All-American: 2014
- First-team Parade All-American: 2014

== Career statistics ==
Legend
GP	Games played	GS	Games started	MPG	Minutes per game
FG%	Field goal percentage	3P%	3-point field goal percentage	FT%	Free throw percentage
RPG	Rebounds per game	APG	Assists per game	SPG	Steals per game
BPG	Blocks per game	PPG	Points per game	**Bold**	Career high
†	Won an NBA championship	*	Led the league

=== NBA ===
==== Regular season ====
Year	Team	GP	GS	MPG	FG%	3P%	FT%	RPG	APG	SPG	BPG	PPG
2015–16	Minnesota	**82***	**82***	32.0	.542	.341	.811	10.5	2.0	.7	**1.7**	18.3
2016–17	Minnesota	**82***	**82***	**37.0**	.542	.367	.832	12.3	2.7	.7	1.3	25.1
2017–18	Minnesota	**82***	**82***	35.6	**.545**	**.421**	.858	12.3	2.4	.8	1.4	21.3
2018–19	Minnesota	77	77	33.0	.518	.400	.836	12.4	3.4	.9	1.6	24.4
2019–20	Minnesota	35	35	33.9	.508	.412	.796	10.8	4.4	.9	1.2	**26.5**
2020–21	Minnesota	50	50	33.8	.486	.387	.859	10.6	4.5	.8	1.1	24.8
2021–22	Minnesota	74	74	33.5	.529	.410	.822	9.8	3.6	**1.0**	1.1	24.6
2022–23	Minnesota	29	29	33.0	.495	.366	**.874**	8.1	**4.8**	.7	.6	20.8
2023–24	Minnesota	62	62	32.7	.504	.416	.873	8.3	3.0	.7	.7	21.8
2024–25	New York	72	72	35.0	.526	.420	.829	**12.8**	3.1	**1.0**	.7	24.4
2025–26†	New York	75	75	31.0	.501	.368	.858	11.9	3.0	.9	.5	20.1
Career		720	720	33.7	.522	.397	.840	11.1	3.1	.8	1.1	22.8
All-Star		6	1	17.7	.649	.382	1.000	6.2	1.3	.2	.0	19.5

==== Playoffs ====
Year	Team	GP	GS	MPG	FG%	3P%	FT%	RPG	APG	SPG	BPG	PPG
2018	Minnesota	5	5	33.9	.467	.273	.739	**13.4**	2.2	.4	1.0	15.2
2022	Minnesota	6	6	**36.9**	.488	.455	.860	10.8	2.2	.7	**2.0**	**21.8**
2023	Minnesota	5	5	36.0	.457	.250	.750	10.2	2.0	.6	.8	18.2
2024	Minnesota	16	16	32.6	.466	.361	.855	9.0	2.6	.8	.2	19.1
2025	New York	18	18	35.5	.488	.351	.845	11.6	1.3	.7	.7	21.4
2026†	New York	**19**	**19**	30.4	**.551**	**.456**	**.909**	10.6	**4.9**	**1.3**	1.3	15.9
Career		69	69	33.5	.491	.373	.849	10.7	2.8	.8	.9	18.7

=== College ===
Year	Team	GP	GS	MPG	FG%	3P%	FT%	RPG	APG	SPG	BPG	PPG
2014–15	Kentucky	39	39	21.1	.566	.250	.813	6.7	1.1	.5	2.3	10.3

== Personal life ==
Towns began dating socialite Jordyn Woods in March 2020. The following month, his mother died from complications of COVID-19. Towns has stated that six other family members have died after contracting COVID-19. For the first anniversary of Towns's mother's death, Woods commissioned her brother, John Woods Jr., to create a portrait of Towns's mother, which was then gifted to him. On December 25, 2025, Towns and Woods announced their engagement. They were married on August 15, 2026, in Malibu, California.

In 2024, Towns received the Kareem Abdul-Jabbar Social Justice Champion Award from the NBA for his social justice work. The award announcement highlighted his work advocating for voting rights and specifically in support of Minnesota's state legislation that restored the right to vote to people who had formerly been incarcerated. The award also noted his work as the producer for a short documentary about the justice system, Forgiving Johnny.

Towns is a fan of the Philadelphia Eagles. Growing up in New Jersey, he was a Knicks fan. He made a cameo as himself in the film The Devil Wears Prada 2 (2026).

== See also ==
- List of NBA single-game scoring leaders
- List of people from the Dominican Republic
