= 2026 NBA Finals =

North America basketball championship

Team	Coach	Wins
New York Knicks	Mike Brown	4
San Antonio Spurs	Mitch Johnson	1
- Dates: June 3–13
- MVP: Jalen Brunson (New York Knicks)
- Eastern finals: Knicks defeated Cavaliers, 4–0
- Western finals: Spurs defeated Thunder, 4–3

The 2026 NBA Finals was the championship series of the National Basketball Association's (NBA) 2025–26 season and conclusion to the season's playoffs. The best-of-seven series ended when the Eastern Conference champion New York Knicks beat the Western Conference champion San Antonio Spurs, four games to one. It was the Knicks' third NBA championship, and their first since 1973. The series ran from June 3 to June 13, 2026. New York's Jalen Brunson was named NBA Finals Most Valuable Player (MVP) for his performance, where in game 5 he recorded 45 points, tying an NBA Finals record with Michael Jordan for the most points scored on the road in a series-clinching game.

The series was a rematch of the 1999 NBA Finals, which the Spurs won in five games, and of the 2025 NBA Cup championship game, which the Knicks won 124–113. It was the first NBA Finals to feature the finalist teams of the three-year-old NBA Cup. It was the NBA's eighth consecutive year with a unique champion, the longest such stretch in league history.

New York won the first two games, a first in the Finals for the team. San Antonio won game 3 after the Knicks missed their final three-point attempt. In game 4, the Knicks rallied from 29 points down in the third quarter, and OG Anunoby won the game with a tip-in with 1.2 seconds remaining. The Knicks won game 5 by four points to clinch their first title since 1973.

This was the first NBA Finals since 1995 in which a team won two straight road games to open the series; it was the first since 1993 in which the road team won the first three games. Game 4 saw the Spurs obtain the largest halftime lead of any visiting team in Finals history, then saw the Knicks overcome the largest deficit in Finals history to win. It was the first Finals series since 1975 in which multiple games were won by a single point. It was the first Finals ever in which the teams were within five points of each other in the final five minutes of each game. The average margin of victory was just four points. The Spurs built double-digit leads in all of these games, but lost four of them. Several media outlets called the series the best of the decade and the best five-game series of all time. It was the most-watched NBA Finals since 1998, with an average of 20.6 million viewers per game.

This was also the first championship won by a New York City-based team in one of the four major sports leagues since the New York Giants won Super Bowl XLVI in February 2012.

== Background ==
This was the second Finals meeting between the San Antonio Spurs and the New York Knicks. In their previous Finals meeting, during the lockout-shortened season of 1999, the Spurs defeated the eighth-seeded Knicks in five games to win their first NBA championship. The teams had met in the championship of the 2025 NBA Cup, which New York won, 124–113. It was the first time both NBA Cup finalists had appeared in the Finals, and the first time the winner had made the NBA Finals. The two teams split their two regular-season games. (Note: The 2025 NBA Cup championship, which New York won 124–113, does not count in the regular season standings.)

For the first time since the 2009 NBA Finals, a logo version of the Larry O'Brien Championship Trophy was prominently featured on center court; it was painted on instead of being a decal to prevent players from slipping. The NBA Finals wordmarks returned to the court for the first time since 2014. The NBA had been criticized for omitting the logos during the previous season's Finals while including those during that season's NBA Cup. The jerseys of the teams had a USA 250 patch in recognition of the United States Semiquincentennial.

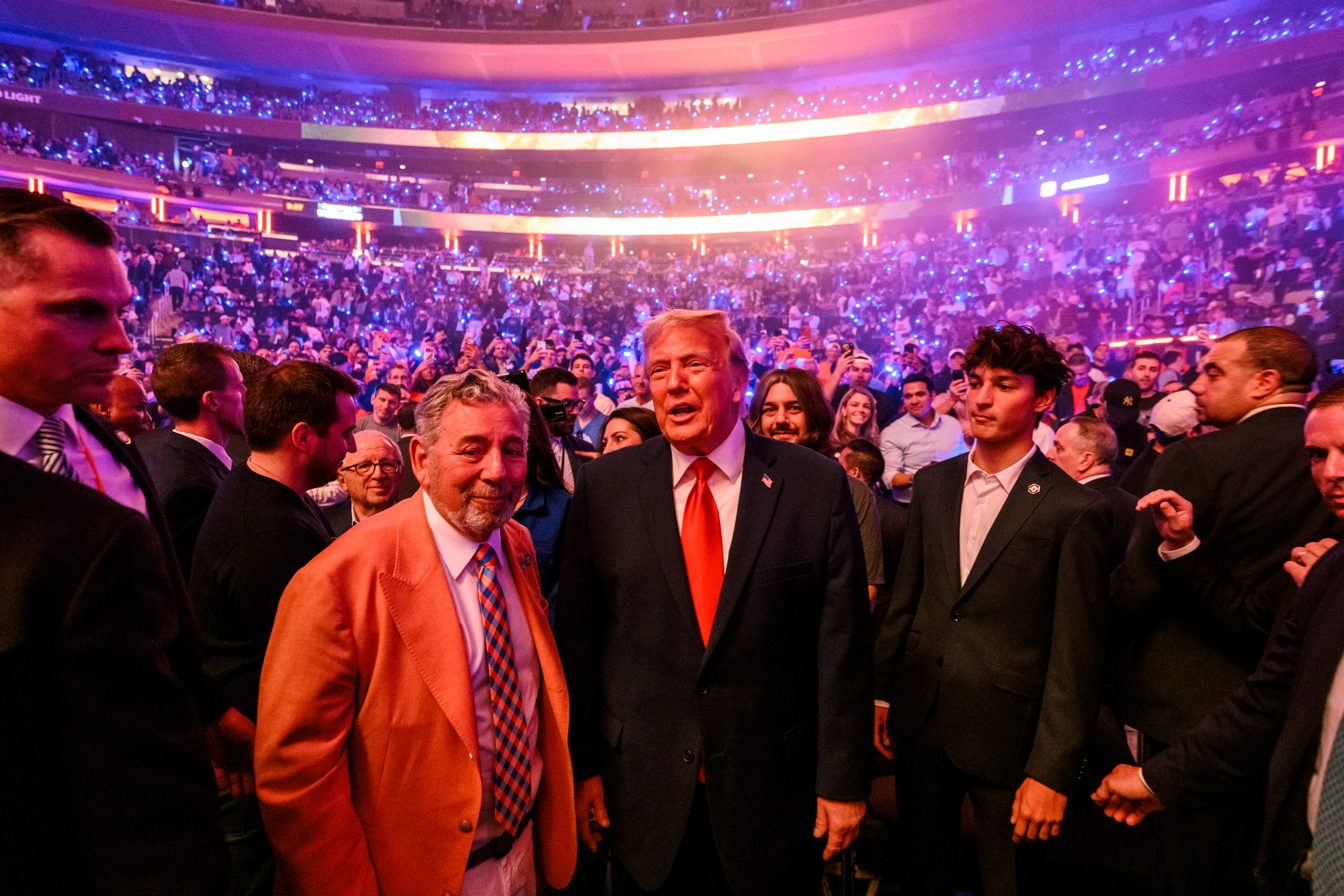
President Donald Trump and Knicks owner James Dolan (left) at game 3 of the Finals

President Donald Trump attended game 3 at the invitation of Knicks owner James Dolan, becoming the first sitting president to attend an NBA Finals game. Fans who attended the games waited in long lines to pass through Transportation Security Administration-style security, and 5 blocks in all directions outside of Madison Square Garden were closed off hours before tip-off. His appearance was widely discussed by the media and panned by Knicks fans, especially after watch parties for game 3 were canceled, reportedly due to his attendance.

=== New York Knicks ===
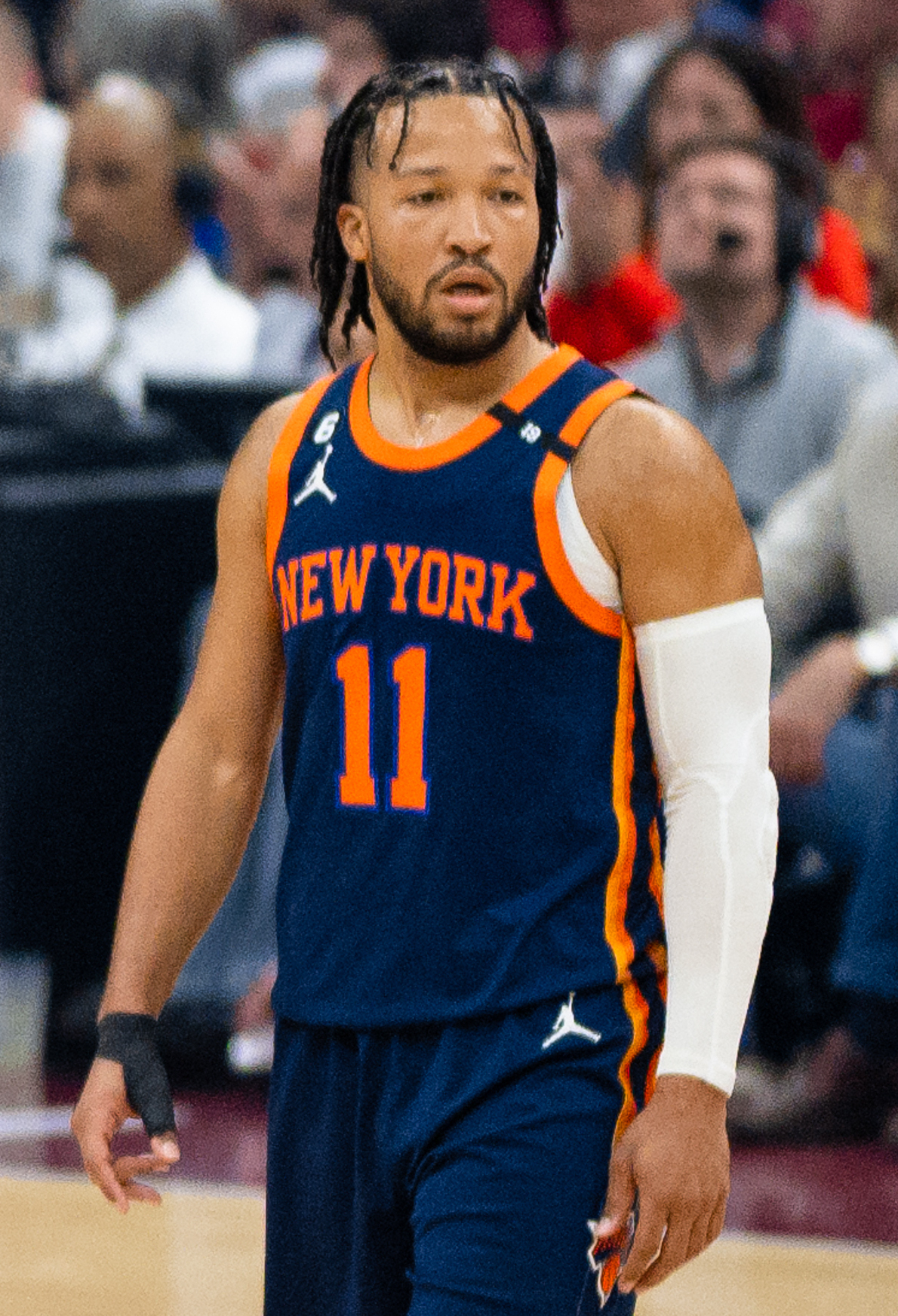
Jalen Brunson led the Knicks to their first NBA Finals appearance since 1999, which was when Brunson's father and current Knicks assistant, Rick, was on the team.

Since their last Finals appearance in 1999, the Knicks experienced 27 years of dysfunction and frustration, making the playoffs only five times from 2001 to 2022. Their fortunes started to turn when the team hired former Creative Artists Agency (CAA) agents Leon Rose and William Wesley as executives to run their basketball operation in 2020. Their first major transaction was bringing in their former client and longtime coach Tom Thibodeau as head coach, who was an assistant on the 1999 team, a few weeks later. They signed point guard Jalen Brunson in free agency in 2022, who broke out in New York as an elite player. Brunson led the Knicks to the second round in 2023 and 2024, and to the Eastern Conference Finals in 2025, where they lost to the Indiana Pacers. Despite the team's renewed success, the defense-minded Thibodeau was fired after the loss to the Pacers and replaced by Mike Brown, although Brown was not the team's first choice.

Under the first season with head coach Brown, the New York Knicks finished with a 53–29 record, their highest win total since 2012–13. Their regular season was highlighted by a 124–113 win over the San Antonio Spurs in the NBA Cup Final in Las Vegas on December 16. They were led by All-Star and Second Team All-NBA point guard Jalen Brunson, All-Star center Karl-Anthony Towns in his second season after a blockbuster trade from the Minnesota Timberwolves, Second Team All-NBA Defensive forward OG Anunoby, 3-and-D wing Mikal Bridges and the versatile Josh Hart, the latter two who were Brunson's teammates in college at Villanova. Under Brown, the Knicks utilized their bench more than under former coach Tom Thibodeau, which featured big man Mitchell Robinson (the longest tenured Knick, at that point), guards Miles McBride and Landry Shamet, microwave scorer Jordan Clarkson, and midseason trade acquisition Jose Alvarado.

Although the Knicks finished with an impressive record and a third-seed, they did not peak as a team until the playoffs. In the first round, the Knicks defeated the Atlanta Hawks in six games, winning the final three games after being down 2–1. They then swept the Philadelphia 76ers in the Eastern Conference semifinals and the Cleveland Cavaliers in the Eastern Conference finals to reach the NBA Finals. The Knicks' playoff run has been labeled one of the most dominant in NBA history due to their 11-game postseason winning streak and a record playoff victory margin of 19.4 points per game. Noted for their playoff surge was the team's effort to play through Towns midway through the Hawks series, as the team had been previously too reliant on Brunson for offense.

Overall, this was New York's ninth Finals appearance. The only Knicks players with prior Finals experience are Mikal Bridges, who lost with the Phoenix Suns in 2021, and Jordan Clarkson, who lost with the Cleveland Cavaliers in 2018; OG Anunoby won a championship with the Toronto Raptors in 2019 but did not play in the playoffs due to an appendectomy. Mike Brown lost his first Finals appearance in 2007, coincidentally against the San Antonio Spurs, as head coach for the Cavaliers, but has won multiple championships as an assistant with the Spurs and Golden State Warriors. The Knicks' 53-year championship drought was the fifth longest in the NBA.

=== San Antonio Spurs ===
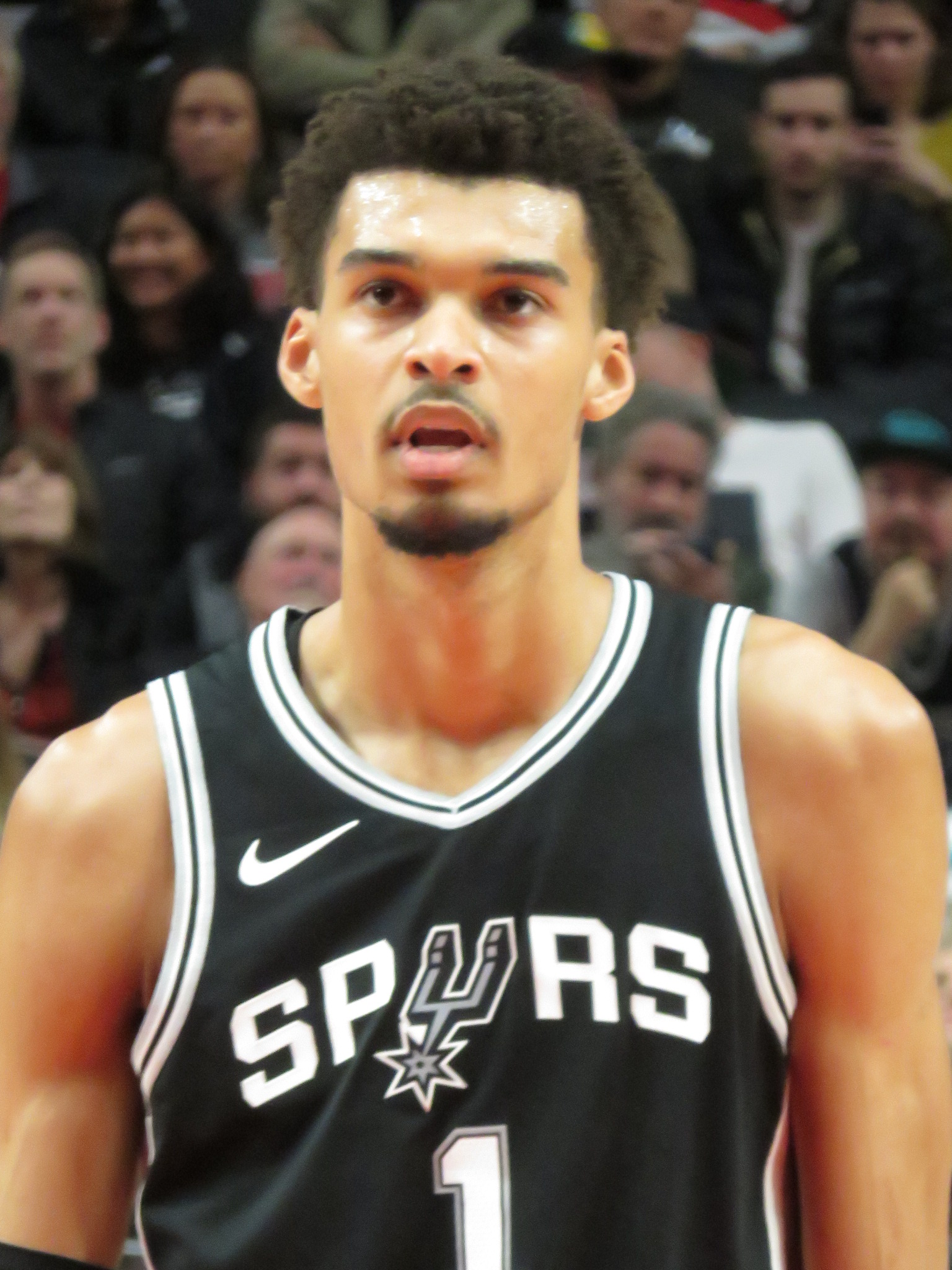
Victor Wembanyama was the first No. 1 overall pick to make the NBA Finals with the team that drafted him since Deandre Ayton did so in 2021 with the Phoenix Suns.

During the 2023 draft lottery, the San Antonio Spurs were awarded the top pick and took French phenom Victor Wembanyama, who was touted as the best draft prospect since LeBron James. They were then awarded the #4 and #2 picks in the 2024 and 2025 lotteries and took Stephon Castle and Dylan Harper, respectively. Hall of Fame coach Gregg Popovich stepped down early in the season in 2024–25 due to health concerns and his assistant Mitch Johnson took over. With Johnson at the helm in his first full-season as coach, the Spurs ended their six-year playoff drought with a 62–20 record. In his third season, Wembanyama averaged 25 points per game, 11.5 rebounds per game, and 3.1 blocks per game. In terms of accolades received, he was an All-Star, was named the Defensive Player of the Year (the award's first unanimous and youngest winner), earned First Team nods in All-NBA and All-NBA Defensive, and finished third in the Most Valuable Player voting. Veteran point guard De'Aaron Fox, who came over at last season's trade deadline from the Sacramento Kings, joined Wembanyama as an All-Star. Second overall pick Dylan Harper made the NBA's All-Rookie First Team, while Keldon Johnson won the Sixth Man of the Year. The Spurs had a 40-game turnaround from their 22–60 record in 2023–24.

As the two-seed in the Western Conference playoffs, they defeated the Portland Trail Blazers in five games in the first round and the Minnesota Timberwolves in the Western Conference semifinals in six games. The Western Conference finals saw them take on the defending champion Oklahoma City Thunder in a highly anticipated match-up between the two best teams record-wise in the NBA. The Spurs prevailed in the hard-fought series, defeating the Thunder on their own homecourt in the decisive seventh game. The Spurs were the second-youngest team to ever reach the NBA Finals (25.06 years old), trailing only the 1976–77 Trail Blazers (25.03).

This was San Antonio's seventh NBA Finals appearance. The Spurs were 5–1 in their previous Finals appearances, with their only loss in 2013 to the Miami Heat (a year later, they defeated the Heat, which was their last appearance). Harrison Barnes, Luke Kornet, and Kelly Olynyk are the only Spurs players with Finals experience. Barnes won a championship with the Golden State Warriors in 2015 and made another appearance in 2016, Kornet won a championship with the Boston Celtics in 2024, and Olynyk reached the 2020 Finals with the Miami Heat.

=== Road to the Finals ===
Eastern Conference
#	Team	W	L	PCT	GB	GP
1	c – Detroit Pistons *	60	22	.732	–	82
2	y – Boston Celtics *	56	26	.683	4.0	82
3	x – New York Knicks	53	29	.646	7.0	82
4	x – Cleveland Cavaliers	52	30	.634	8.0	82
5	x – Toronto Raptors	46	36	.561	14.0	82
6	y – Atlanta Hawks *	46	36	.561	14.0	82
7	x – Philadelphia 76ers	45	37	.549	15.0	82
8	x – Orlando Magic	45	37	.549	15.0	82
9	pi – Charlotte Hornets	44	38	.537	16.0	82
10	pi – Miami Heat	43	39	.524	17.0	82
11	Milwaukee Bucks	32	50	.390	28.0	82
12	Chicago Bulls	31	51	.378	29.0	82
13	Brooklyn Nets	20	62	.244	40.0	82
14	Indiana Pacers	19	63	.232	41.0	82
15	Washington Wizards	17	65	.207	43.0	82

Western Conference
#	Team	W	L	PCT	GB	GP
1	z – Oklahoma City Thunder *	64	18	.780	–	82
2	y – San Antonio Spurs *	62	20	.756	2.0	82
3	x – Denver Nuggets	54	28	.659	10.0	82
4	y – Los Angeles Lakers *	53	29	.646	11.0	82
5	x – Houston Rockets	52	30	.634	12.0	82
6	x – Minnesota Timberwolves	49	33	.598	15.0	82
7	x – Phoenix Suns	45	37	.549	19.0	82
8	x – Portland Trail Blazers	42	40	.512	22.0	82
9	pi – Los Angeles Clippers	42	40	.512	22.0	82
10	pi – Golden State Warriors	37	45	.451	27.0	82
11	New Orleans Pelicans	26	56	.317	38.0	82
12	Dallas Mavericks	26	56	.317	38.0	82
13	Memphis Grizzlies	25	57	.305	39.0	82
14	Sacramento Kings	22	60	.268	42.0	82
15	Utah Jazz	22	60	.268	42.0	82

Notes

- z – Clinched home court advantage for the entire playoffs
- c – Clinched home court advantage for the conference playoffs
- y – Clinched division title
- pi – Clinched play-in tournament spot (locked into a play-in spot but not able to clinch a playoff spot directly)
- ps – Clinched postseason (at least a play-in spot but can still clinch a playoff spot directly)
- x – Clinched playoff spot
- * – Division leader

Playoff results
New York Knicks (Eastern Conference champion)		San Antonio Spurs (Western Conference champion)
Defeated the 6th-seeded Atlanta Hawks, 4–2	First round	Defeated the 7th-seeded Portland Trail Blazers, 4–1
Defeated the 7th-seeded Philadelphia 76ers, 4–0	Conference semifinals	Defeated the 6th-seeded Minnesota Timberwolves, 4–2
Defeated the 4th-seeded Cleveland Cavaliers, 4–0	Conference finals	Defeated the 1st-seeded Oklahoma City Thunder, 4–3

=== Regular season series ===
The Spurs and Knicks tied the regular season series 1–1, with the home team winning each game.

December 31, 2025

Recap

New York Knicks 132, San Antonio Spurs 134

Frost Bank Center, San Antonio, TX

March 1, 2026

Recap

San Antonio Spurs 89, New York Knicks 114

Madison Square Garden, New York, NY

While the Knicks also defeated the Spurs 124–113 in the 2025 NBA Cup championship game on December 16, 2025, that game did not count toward the official regular season standings or head-to-head tiebreakers.

== Series summary ==
The NBA announced the Finals schedule on January 20, 2026. The league rearranged the series so that it avoided conflicting with the 2026 FIFA World Cup night game between the United States and Paraguay on June 12. No Sunday game was scheduled for the first time since the Knicks' first championship season of 1970, meaning that all games began at 8:30 pm ET instead of 8 pm ET as they would on Sundays. (Note: The 1999 NBA Finals had no Sunday games played, as the series ended in five games, before a potential Game 6 on a Sunday night would have been played.) Game 5 was played on a Saturday night for the second time since 1981 (with the COVID-altered edition of the Finals in 2021 being the only time since then).

Game	Date	Road team	Result	Home team
Game 1	June 3	New York Knicks	105–95 (1–0)	San Antonio Spurs
Game 2	June 5	New York Knicks	105–104 (2–0)	San Antonio Spurs
Game 3	June 8	San Antonio Spurs	115–111 (1–2)	New York Knicks
Game 4	June 10	San Antonio Spurs	106–107 (1–3)	New York Knicks
Game 5	June 13	New York Knicks	94–90 (4–1)	San Antonio Spurs

== Game summaries ==
Note: Times are EDT (UTC−4) as listed by NBA. For games played in San Antonio, the local time is also given (CDT, UTC−5).

=== Game 1 ===
ABC

June 3
8:30 p.m. (7:30 p.m. CDT)

Recap

New York Knicks 105, San Antonio Spurs 95
Scoring by quarter: 19–27, 29–28, 28–21, 29–19
Pts: Jalen Brunson 30; Rebs: Josh Hart 15; Asts: Josh Hart 6	Pts: Victor Wembanyama 26; Rebs: Victor Wembanyama 12; Asts: De'Aaron Fox 5
New York leads series, 1–0

Frost Bank Center, San Antonio, Texas
Attendance: 18,835
Referees:
- No. 48 Scott Foster
- No. 19 James Capers
- No. 4 Sean Wright

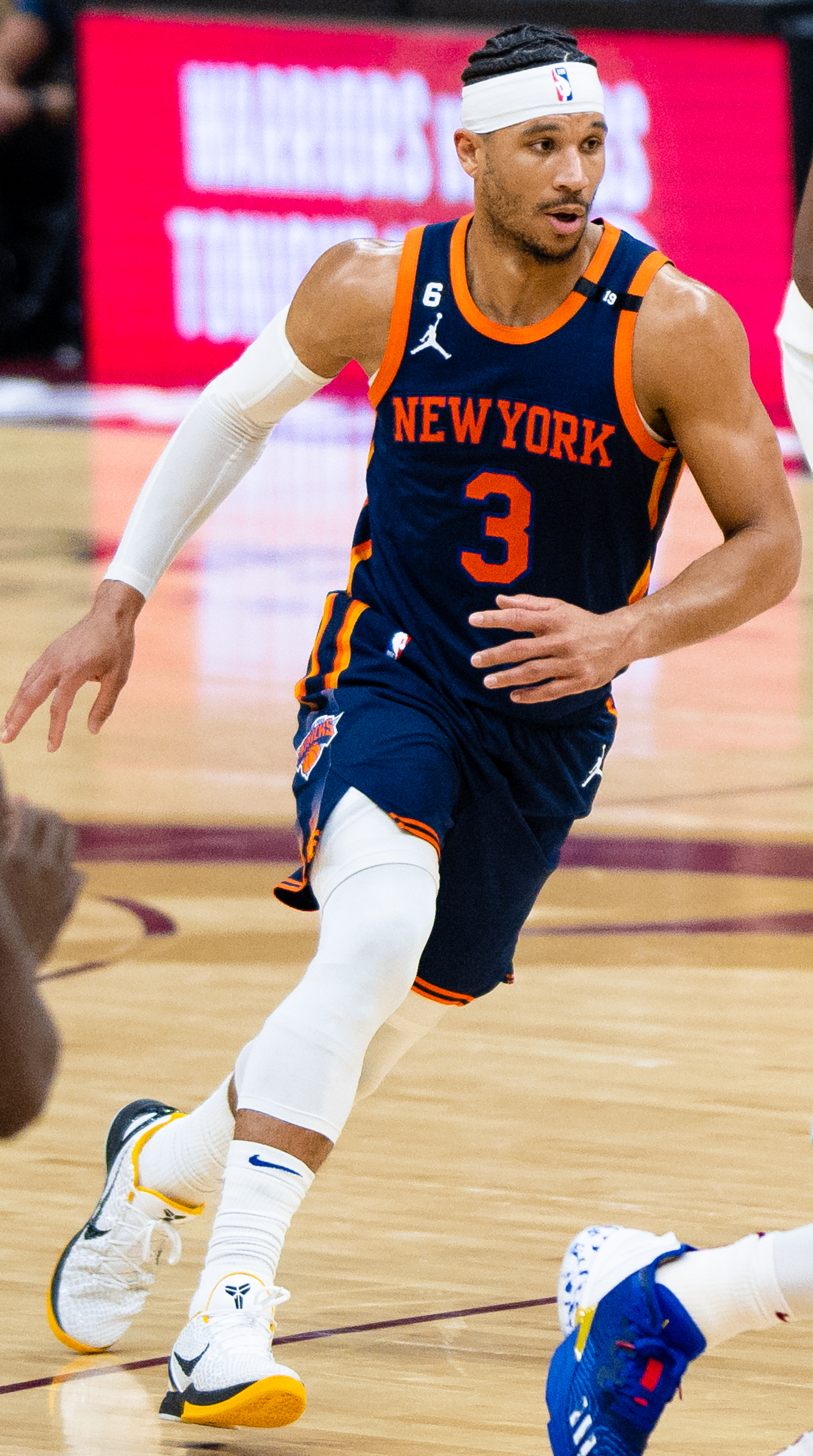
Josh Hart's 15 rebounds were the most by a player 6 feet 5 inches (1.96 m) or under since Elgin Baylor in 1970.

The Knicks overcame a 14-point deficit to win 105–95, marking the first time the Spurs ever faced a series deficit in the Finals. Jalen Brunson led them with 30 points, including 13 in the fourth quarter, on relatively inefficient 12 of 31 shooting, the most attempted shots in a Finals debut since Allen Iverson in 2001. Karl-Anthony Towns finished with 18 points and 12 rebounds, OG Anunoby scored 17 points (12 in the fourth quarter), Landry Shamet scored 13 off the bench, and Josh Hart had six assists, four steals and 15 rebounds. San Antonio's Victor Wembanyama had 12 rebounds and 26 points on poor 6 of 21 shooting. Julian Champagnie scored 16 points and went 5 of 10 on his three-pointers, but the rest of the Spurs shot 6 of 33 (18.2 percent) from the three-point line. Dylan Harper had 16 points, becoming the youngest player to score 10 or more points in a Finals game.

The Knicks started the first quarter going up 14–7, but the Spurs responded with a run led by Dylan Harper, who scored 10 points in the quarter, to go up 27–17 with 1:27 left. At that point, the Knicks called a timeout and Brunson was escorted to the locker room after injuring his right knee. The Knicks closed the gap to three points within the second quarter as Brunson returned with around eight minutes left. Despite another injury to his ankle, Brunson continued to play and scored eight straight points before returning to the bench with the Knicks up 38–37. The lead changed six times during the quarter before the Spurs settled into a 55–48 lead by halftime.

The Knicks only scored two points five minutes into the third quarter, as the Spurs built a 14-point lead by the midway point. Wembanyama was then benched, resulting in Towns leading the Knicks back to within three points with two minutes left, ending it tied at 76–76. Both teams went back-and-forth to start the fourth quarter before Anunoby made two three-pointers to give the Knicks an 86–81 lead by 8:50. The Spurs later evened it, followed by Brunson scoring eight straight points for a 94–86 Knicks lead with 6:34 left, and then San Antonio scoring nine straight for a 95–94 lead with 2:16 left. The Knicks ended the game with an 11–0 run: Brunson made a three-pointer, Bridges scored two free throws, and then Brunson made an off-balance shot with 37.8 seconds left to put his team up by six.

The Knicks were just the third team in NBA history to have a 12-game winning streak in a single-postseason, joining the 1998–99 Spurs, whose streak of wins was coincidentally halted at 12 by the Knicks in game 3 of the 1999 NBA Finals, and the 2016–17 Warriors, who finished with a record 15 consecutive wins. Additionally, with a 10-point win, the Knicks had won 11 of those 12 games by double-digits.

=== Game 2 ===
ABC

June 5
8:30 p.m. (7:30 p.m. CDT)

Recap

New York Knicks 105, San Antonio Spurs 104
Scoring by quarter: 25–34, 31–18, 28–23, 21–29
Pts: Karl-Anthony Towns 21; Rebs: Karl-Anthony Towns 13; Asts: Bridges, Brunson 6 each	Pts: Victor Wembanyama 29; Rebs: Vassell, Wembanyama 9 each Asts: Fox, Vassell 5 each
New York leads series, 2–0

Frost Bank Center, San Antonio, Texas
Attendance: 19,014
Referees:
- No. 25 Tony Brothers
- No. 58 Josh Tiven
- No. 39 Tyler Ford

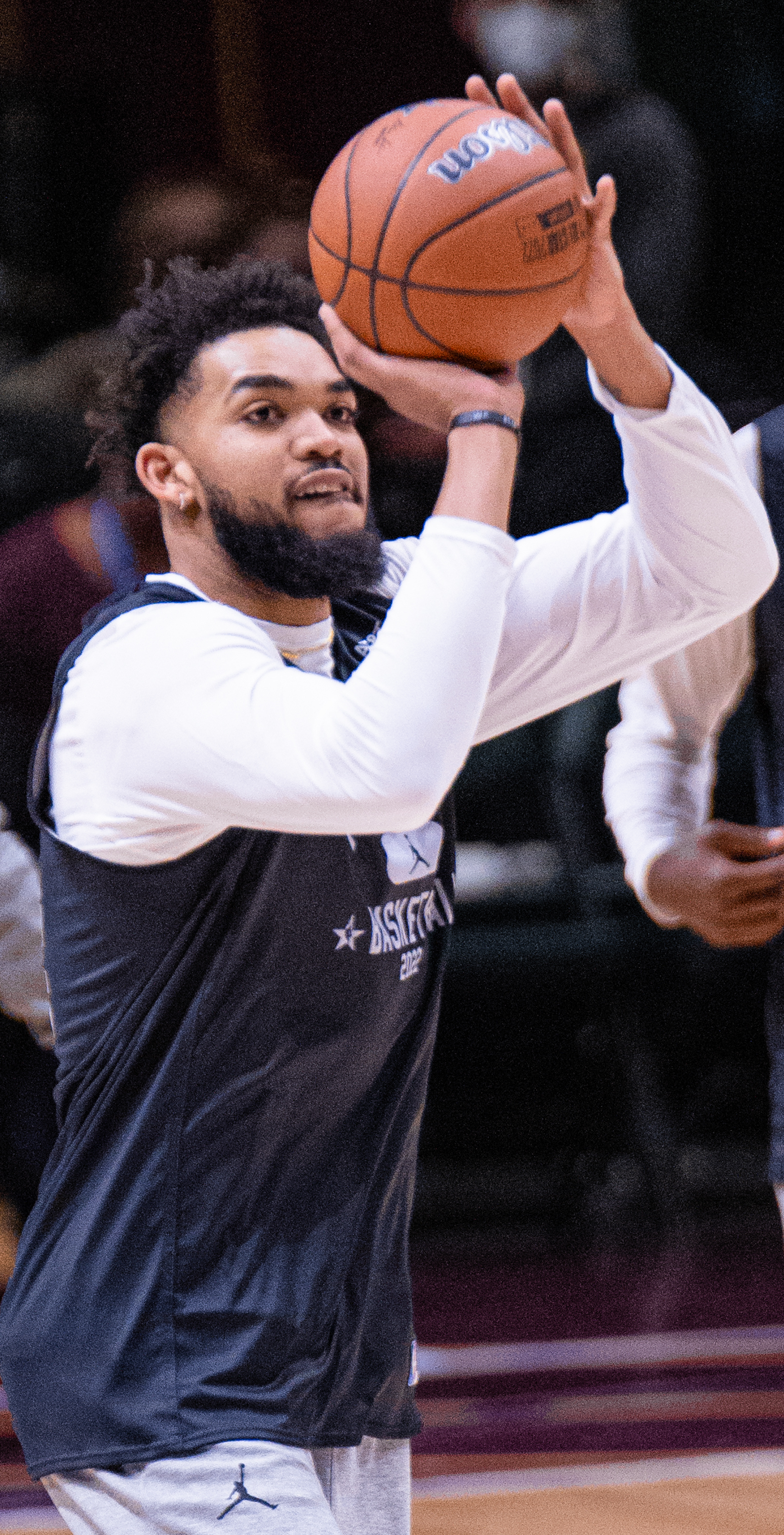
Karl-Anthony Towns followed up his game 1 double-double with another one in game 2, finishing with 21 points and 13 rebounds.

External videos
- Game 2 highlights on the NBA's official YouTube channel

Victor Wembanyama's crucial turnover, foul, and missed shot in the final seconds of game 2 was the difference in the Knicks' 105–104 win. The Knicks became the third team in NBA Finals history to win the first two games on the road, after the 1993 Chicago Bulls and the 1995 Houston Rockets. This was also their 13th straight playoff game win, now the second-longest streak by any team in NBA playoff history.

Karl-Anthony Towns, despite playing in foul trouble for much of the second half, had 21 points on 8–12 shooting and 13 rebounds. Wembanyama was outplayed by Towns in the first half with just 7 points, but got more involved in the second half. He finished with 29 points on 11–21 shooting and grabbed 9 rebounds, but had 4 turnovers, including the game-losing giveaway with the game tied with 9.5 seconds left. Mikal Bridges also had a big game for the Knicks scoring 20 points on 8–13 shooting, while Jalen Brunson added 20 on 25 shots and had 5 steals. OG Anunoby scored 15 points and Landry Shamet provided 13 points off the bench. For San Antonio, De'Aaron Fox rebounded from a rough game 1 with 20 points on 8–12 shooting, but also had four turnovers. Dylan Harper led the team in +/-, scoring 15 points in 32 minutes off the bench.

The Spurs led 34–25 at the end of the first quarter. In the quarter, they were led by Fox, who scored 9 points. Julian Champagnie hit two early threes, and Devin Vassell and Wembanyama chipped in with five points each. The Knicks roared back with a 31–18 second quarter and led 56–52 at halftime. New York then opened the third quarter on a 8–2 run before a quick Spurs timeout. Brunson knocked down a three over Wembanyama to push the Knicks lead to 10, 64–54. Midway through the third quarter, Towns was called for a questionable foul when he got into a battle for positioning on the low block with Stephon Castle. It was his fourth foul, which took him out of the game until the fourth quarter. Castle and Wembanyama's first three-pointer of the night trimmed the deficit down to four points, but the Knicks responded and re-established a nine-point lead with a pair of Mikal Bridges' baskets to close out the third. The Knicks were 4-for-7 from three in the quarter.

Down by as many as 14 points, the Spurs took their first lead since the second quarter via a Dylan Harper pass to Wembanyama for an and-1 on a fast break in the last six minutes of the fourth quarter. Brunson quickly tied things back up on a fadeaway seconds later, knotting the score at 104 with 39.2 seconds left.

After forcing a miss by Brunson on what could have been the Knicks' final possession, Wembanyama collected the rebound and tried to pass it up the floor to Stephon Castle. However, Castle was streaking up the court with his back turned. As Brunson collected the turnover, he was instantly fouled by Wembanyama. The Knicks were in the penalty, which put Brunson at the line, who made the first free-throw but missed the second. On the Spurs' last possession, Wembanyama missed the potential game-winner on a jumpshot on the right side of the key. This was the first time the Knicks franchise had been up 2–0 in an NBA Finals.

=== Game 3 ===
ABC

June 8
8:30 p.m.

Recap

San Antonio Spurs 115, New York Knicks 111
Scoring by quarter: 33–22, 24–42, 35–27, 23–20
Pts: Victor Wembanyama 32; Rebs: Dylan Harper 9 Asts: De'Aaron Fox 8	Pts: Jalen Brunson 32; Rebs: Josh Hart 9 Asts: Jalen Brunson 5
New York leads series, 2–1

Madison Square Garden, New York, New York
Attendance: 19,812
Referees:
- No. 8 Marc Davis
- No. 10 John Goble
- No. 74 Curtis Blair

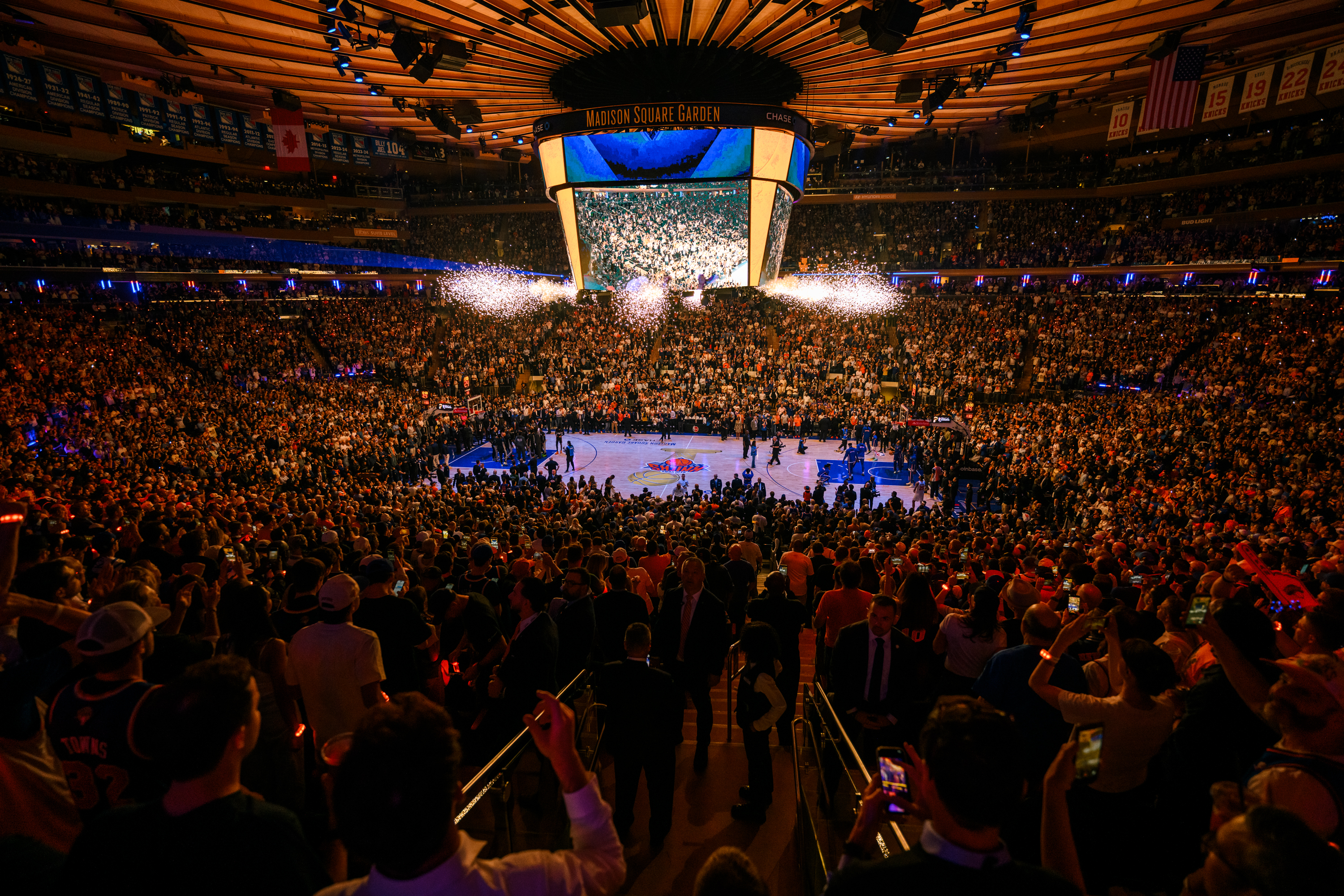
Game 3 of the NBA Finals at Madison Square Garden, the building's first Finals since Game 5 in 1999

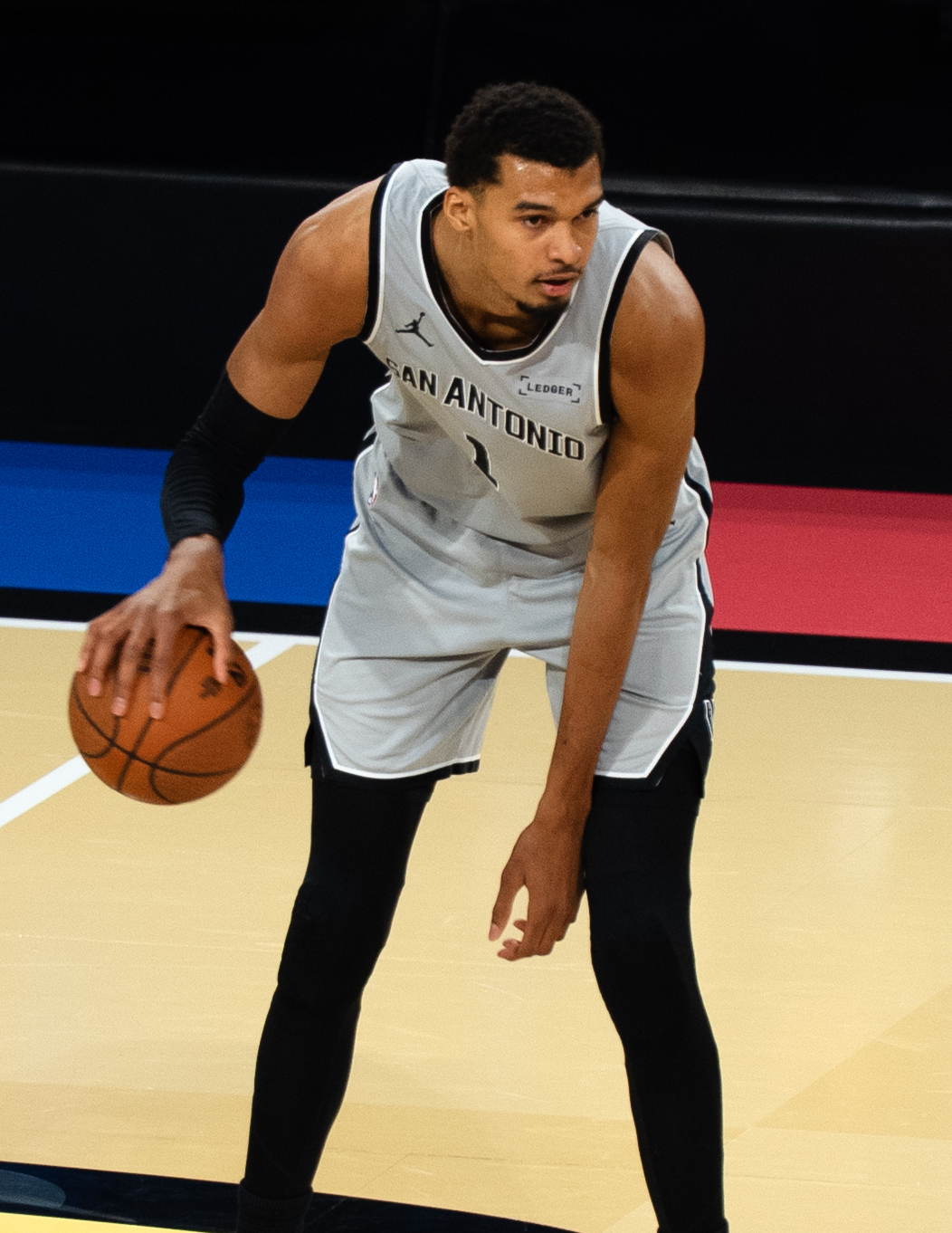
Victor Wembanyama became the second-youngest player to put up a 30–5–5 stat line in the Finals, after Magic Johnson in 1980.

The Knicks 13-game postseason win streak was ended by a 115–111 Spurs victory in game 3. The Spurs opened scoring seven straight points, and established a double-digit lead four and a half minutes into the game. They converted on nine of their first 11 field goal attempts and led 33–22 at the end of the quarter. The Knicks responded in the second quarter with an 11–2 run to narrow the lead to 40–38. They scored 14 points on their final six possessions to end the half as the Spurs faltered offensively, outscoring them 42–24 during the quarter and taking a 64–57 lead.

Entering the third quarter, Julian Champagnie scored six straight points, and the Spurs produced several turnovers to score 15 points on their first eight possessions and reclaim the lead. After delivering an assist to Keldon Johnson to tie the game at 76, Victor Wembanyama scored a three-pointer at 5:02 to reclaim the lead for San Antonio, which they maintained for the rest of the game.

For the first 10 minutes of the fourth quarter the Spurs maintained at least a two-possession lead against the Knicks, taking advantage of their bonus situation from 9:18 onwards. With 1:53 remaining, Stephon Castle scored a desperation three-pointer, his team's only make of the quarter, to put the Spurs up 111–104. Later, on the other end, OG Anunoby made a free throw and Brunson a three-pointer to narrow the lead, but De'Aaron Fox scored a jump shot with 12.2 seconds left bring it to 113–108. Anunoby followed with a three-pointer with 9.4 seconds remaining, but Castle was then fouled after a timeout with 6.8 seconds left and made two free throws to make it a two-possession game. Mikal Bridges and Anunoby missed their final three-point attempts to seal the Spurs victory.

In what was considered his best game of the series, Wembanyama led the Spurs on both ends with 32 points, 8 rebounds and 6 assists. Castle followed with 23 points, 18 in the first half and 5 in the second. For the Knicks, Jalen Brunson had 32 points but 5 turnovers, and shot 11-for-25 from the field. Anunoby had 28 points on 9-for-13 shooting, while Karl-Anthony Towns was limited to 11 points and 8 rebounds. The Spurs capitalized off New York's 13 turnovers to convert for 21 points, while also defending effectively and sharing the ball on offense. The Spurs shot 20-for-24 for free throws in the second half compared to 6-for-8 for the Knicks; the discrepancy in attempts draw scrutiny from Knicks head coach Mike Brown during his postgame press conference.

=== Game 4 ===
ABC

June 10
8:30 p.m.

Recap

San Antonio Spurs 106, New York Knicks 107
Scoring by quarter: 41–22, 35–27, 14–26, 16–32
Pts: Victor Wembanyama 24; Rebs: Victor Wembanyama 13; Asts: De'Aaron Fox 7	Pts: Jalen Brunson 36; Rebs: Karl-Anthony Towns 10; Asts: Jalen Brunson 7
New York leads series, 3–1

Madison Square Garden, New York, New York
Attendance: 19,812
Referees:
- No. 15 Zach Zarba
- No. 60 James Williams
- No. 61 Courtney Kirkland

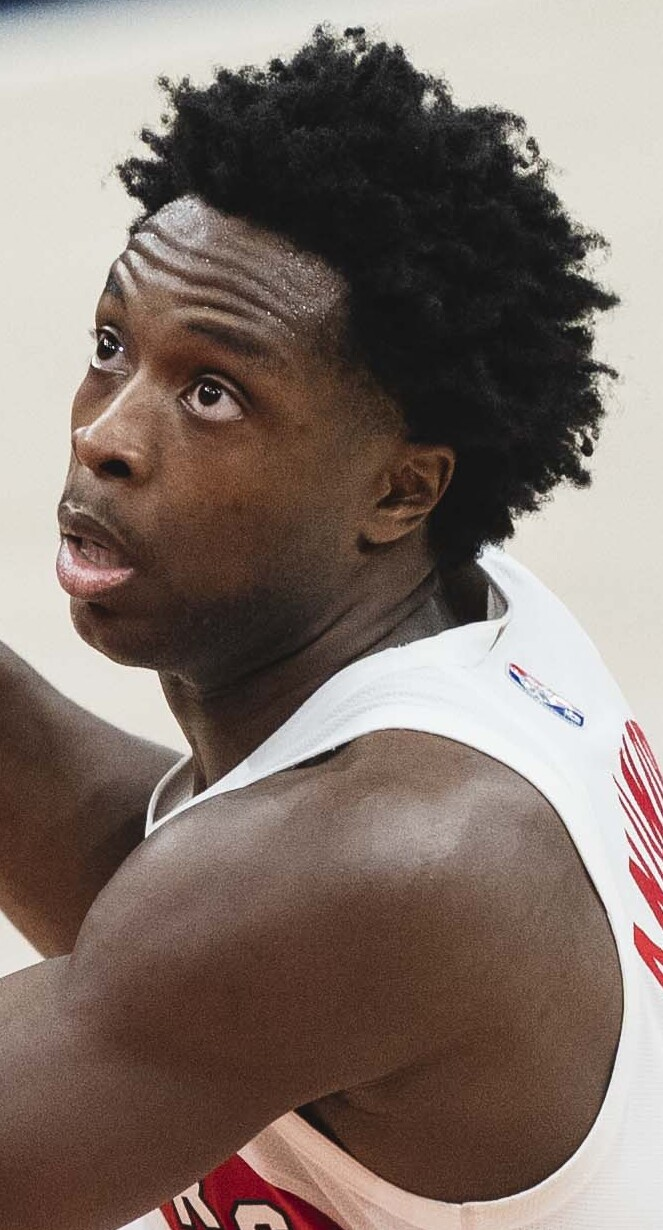
With 1.2 seconds left in game 4 of the 2026 NBA Finals, OG Anunoby tips the ball in off of a missed three-pointer by Jalen Brunson to complete the Knicks' 29-point comeback over the Spurs.

External videos
- Game 4 highlights on the NBA's official YouTube channel

OG Anunoby's game-winning putback layup with 1.2 seconds left sealed the Knicks' 29-point comeback win, moving them within one win away from their first title since 1973. The Knicks' 29-point comeback was the largest comeback in Finals history, surpassing game 4 of the 2008 series between the Boston Celtics and the Los Angeles Lakers, where Boston erased a 24-point deficit. New York broke their own franchise record for the largest postseason comeback and tying the 2025 champion Oklahoma City Thunder for the second-largest comeback in playoff history.

Karl-Anthony Towns picked up two fouls in the game's first 90 seconds, becoming the fastest player to pick up that many fouls that early in an NBA Finals game since 1998. The Spurs took an early lead in the first quarter. Mitchell Robinson elbowed Wembanyama in the face and received a flagrant foul after Wembanyama had taunted Robinson on the play before. San Antonio's 19-point, 41–22 lead, was the largest first quarter lead by a road team in NBA Finals history. Forward Devin Vassell had his best quarter of the series, scoring 12 points on perfect 4-for-4 field goal attempts. Wembanyama led the way with 13 points, and the Spurs as shot 65.2 percent from the field and 6-for-10 from three. Meanwhile, after Towns picked up his early fouls, the Knicks shot just 29 percent.

Vassell remained perfect from the field midway through the second quarter, making all four of his three-point attempts. Overall in the quarter, the Spurs built a 27-point halftime lead, the largest in Finals history by a road team. In addition, their 14 threes were the most in a half in the NBA Finals in the play-by-play era (since 1997). To prevent the Knicks from building any momentum, the Spurs employed a Hack-a-Mitch in the quarter against Mitchell Robinson, who missed all four of his foul shots before being taken out of the game in favor of seldom-used big man Ariel Hukporti. New York rap group the Wu-Tang Clan performed during the halftime show.

Entering the third quarter, with the Spurs holding a 29-point lead, 81–52, with 9:27 remaining, Wembanyama picked a flagrant foul after an elbow to the chin to Towns. He already had three flagrant foul points in the postseason; if he received a fourth, that would mean an automatic one-game suspension. That was when the Knicks responded with a 13–0 run, aided by consecutive three-pointers from Jalen Brunson, Anunoby, and Josh Hart , to cut into the Spurs' lead. They held the Spurs to 14 points on 4-of-20 shooting in the quarter. At the end of the third, the Knicks had cut the deficit down to 15, 90–75, outscoring San Antonio 26–14 and ending the quarter on a 19–5 run.

Early in the fourth quarter, the Spurs pushed their lead back up to 20, but a three-point field goal from Alvarado, a layup from Bridges, and a contested three-pointer from Towns late in the shot clock brought it back to 12. With 6:34 left, Towns drove baseline for a floater over Wembanyama to cut the deficit down to nine points for the first time since early in the first quarter. Moments later at 4:32, Anunoby scored a three-pointer, his seventh of the contest, to cut the Spurs lead to four, 99–95. On the next possession, De'Aaron Fox then made a three to push their lead back to 102–95. They traded baskets on their next possessions until an Alvarado three brought the Knicks back to four points, 104–100, with 3:07 left. Another Knicks three from Brunson over Wembanyama made it a one-point game at 2:21. After a Fox turnover and steal, Josh Hart had a breakaway that would have given the Knicks the lead but missed the layup attempt. Wembanyama was fouled on the next possession but missed both free throws. Brunson then drove inside for a floater to put the Knicks in front for the first time in the game. At this point, the Spurs were 8-of-37 from the field (21.6%) in the second half. The Spurs committed another turnover when Stephon Castle threw the ball out of bounds with 1:02 left in the game. Brunson and Fox missed both their shots on the two team's next possession, but Castle rebounded Fox's miss and was fouled by Hart on the putback attempt at 30.2 seconds, who then made both free throws to give the Spurs the one-point lead, 106–105.

The Spurs had a runout after Brunson missed a runner, but instead of looking to run out the clock, Fox attempted a layup and was blocked by the trailing Anunoby. Fox's decision to attempt the layup was immediately called one of the biggest Finals blunders in NBA history on social media. Mike Brown called a timeout, as the Knicks had the ball now with 5.7 seconds remaining. Anunoby inbounded the ball to Brunson, who attempted a three over Wembanyama, but it bounced off the rim. Anunoby ran to the rim from the three-point line and completed the right-handed tip-in to give the Knicks a one-point lead with 1.2 seconds left on the clock.

The Spurs, with the ball advanced to halfcourt after a timeout, got the inbounds pass tipped by Towns and were not able to complete the lob to the open Castle, securing the largest comeback in NBA Finals history. The Knicks led for just 53.8 seconds, the second-least amount of time leading in a Finals win since the 1976–77 merger.

Brunson scored 36 points, playing all 24 minutes in the second half, and Anunoby finished with 33 on 10 of 15 shooting. During their historic comeback, Anunoby and Alvarado combined to shoot 10-for-13 for 27 points in the second half, while Wembanyama and Fox were 5-for-22 for 13 points. The Spurs shot just 3-for-17 from three-point range in the second half and scored only 30 points after halftime, compared to 76 in the first half. Anunoby's putback was the third-latest game-winner in Finals history in the play-by-play era (since 1997), behind Michael Jordan's game-winner in 1997 and Tyrese Haliburton's in 2025. After the game, Knicks center Karl-Anthony Towns called Anunoby's tip-in the "right hand from God", a nod to Argentina player Diego Maradona's "hand of God" goal in the 1986 FIFA World Cup match versus England. Several outlets considered game 4 one of the greatest NBA games of all time. Anunoby's game-winning tip-in won the Best Play ESPY Award a month later.

=== Game 5 ===
ABC

June 13
8:30 p.m. (7:30 p.m. CDT)

Recap

New York Knicks 94, San Antonio Spurs 90
Scoring by quarter: 13–23, 24–19, 28–30, 29–18
Pts: Jalen Brunson 45; Rebs: Josh Hart 11; Asts: Mikal Bridges 4	Pts: Dylan Harper 25; Rebs: Victor Wembanyama 14; Asts: De'Aaron Fox 5
New York wins NBA Finals, 4–1

Frost Bank Center, San Antonio, Texas
Attendance: 18,984
Referees:
- No. 48 Scott Foster
- No. 19 James Capers
- No. 39 Tyler Ford

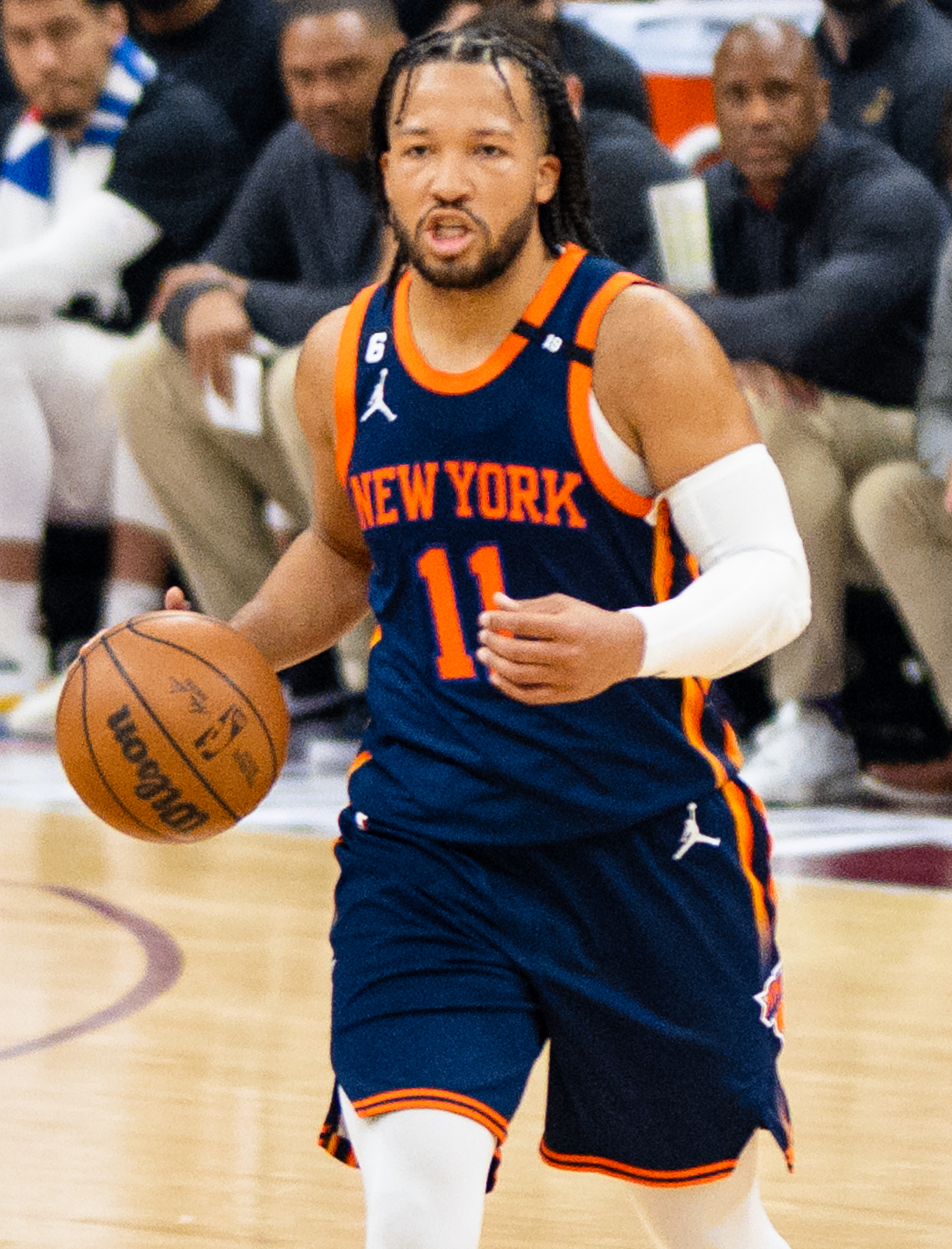
Jalen Brunson scored a Finals franchise-record 45 points to guide New York to their first championship in 53 years. Averaging 32.6 points per game throughout the series, he was named the Finals MVP.

External videos
- Game 5 highlights on the NBA's official YouTube channel

On the back of a 45-point performance from guard Jalen Brunson, the Knicks ended their 53-year title drought with a 94–90 triumph in game 5. Brunson joined Michael Jordan as the only players to score 45 points on the road in a championship-clinching game. The game followed a similar trend to most of the other four games. The Spurs got off to a quick start, though it was not due to their offense like game 4. Their defense held the Knicks to just 13 points in the first quarter, which included a stretch where they held New York to just 10 points on 3 of 20 shooting in the first ten minutes of the game. At one point, Brunson had made 6 of 11 shots, while the rest of the team had shot 4/26 from the field. Victor Wembanyama led the way with three blocks and continued to get Karl-Anthony Towns into foul trouble. On offense, Dylan Harper was a perfect 3 for 3 shooting with 7 points off the bench. Early in the second quarter, Wembanyama picked up two more blocks, giving him 5 in the game thus far. After the Spurs reached a 16-point lead, the Knicks slowly got themselves back in the game. A flurry of buckets from Brunson got the Knicks to within six late in the second quarter. At halftime, the Spurs led 42–37, which was the lowest score at a half in the Finals since 2010.

On the first possession out of the half, Towns picked up his fourth foul. Despite this and getting nothing from the bench (they did not score a basket until well into the fourth by Landry Shamet), the Knicks were still in the game, thanks in large part to Brunson. Midway through the third quarter, Brunson had a game-high of 22 points on 9 of 17 shooting, while his teammates combined for 28 points on 10 of 38 from the field. At 5:28 in the quarter, Brunson made a three-pointer, but came down on Wembanyama's foot, which was in Brunson's landing space. The play caused controversy, as a potential flagrant foul was not called, which would have led to a Wembanyama suspension for the next game.

The Spurs regained control in the latter half of the third quarter and led 72–65 entering the fourth. A big moment came at 5:30 left in the game when the Spurs challenged a foul call on Wembanyama, which would have given him four fouls. Instead, replay showed Towns pushed Wembanyama before barreling into Brunson, which the referees overturned and thus gave Towns his fifth foul. Jalen Brunson then went on an individual 10-0 run to tie the game including a layup over Wembanyama. His layup with 4:47 remaining tied the game at 83. At 3:40, Devin Vassell fouled Brunson at the three-point line. Brunson hit all three free-throws, giving him 43 points, and the Knicks lead for the first time since the eight-minute mark of the first quarter at 86–85. With 1:53 remaining, Towns fouled out. Spurs' rookie Dylan Harper made a jumper to tie the game at 88 but Brunson responded by making a floater with 1:06 remaining. Brunson finished the game with 45 points on 14-27 from the field. Harper had a chance to tie the score at 90 with 27 seconds left and on a fastbreak layup attempt, but missed. After miss, the Spurs chose to foul instead of playing out the clock in hopes for a rebound and last second shot. Josh Hart made the first free throw but missed the second. However, Mitchell Robinson grabbed an offensive rebound over Wembanyama and smartly passed the ball immediately so he wouldn't be fouled, which resulted in OG Anunoby splitting free throws. After Stephon Castle had a put back dunk to cut the deficit to 2 off a missed three by Wembanyama, Mikal Bridges missed the first free throw but made the second. The Knicks then fouled up three instead of allowing the Spurs to get a three-point shot attempt. Harper missed both free throws and OG Anunoby rebounded the ball, was fouled by Harper, and split the resulting free throws to go up four with 7.7 seconds left. Wembanyama missed a three-pointer, giving New York the championship. Anunoby grabbed the final rebound. Despite only going five games, the Finals were decided by an average of four points. The Knicks also led in the series for just 23.6 percent. ABC play-by-play announcer and longtime Knicks' TV announcer Mike Breen noted that the Knicks won the title on June 13, which is coincidentally the same number as Red Holzman's 613 wins as the Knicks head coach. Holzman was the head coach for the Knicks first two championships in 1970 and 1973.

During the postgame, with San Antonio being dominated by Knicks fans, Jalen Brunson was named the NBA Finals Most Valuable Player. Many former Knicks greats, such as Patrick Ewing, John Starks, Walt Frazier, and Allan Houston, as well as notable fan Spike Lee, joined the team as they were awarded the Larry O'Brien Trophy by commissioner Adam Silver.

== Rosters ==
=== New York Knicks ===
2025–26 New York Knicks roster
Players

Pos.	No.	Player	Height	Weight	DOB	From
G	5	Jose Alvarado	6 ft 0 in (1.83 m)	179 lb (81 kg)	1998-04-12	Georgia Tech
F	8	OG Anunoby	6 ft 7 in (2.01 m)	240 lb (109 kg)	1997-07-17	Indiana
G/F	25	Mikal Bridges	6 ft 6 in (1.98 m)	209 lb (95 kg)	1996-08-30	Villanova
G	11	Jalen Brunson	6 ft 2 in (1.88 m)	190 lb (86 kg)	1996-08-31	Villanova
G	00	Jordan Clarkson	6 ft 5 in (1.96 m)	194 lb (88 kg)	1992-06-07	Missouri
F	4	Pacôme Dadiet	6 ft 9 in (2.06 m)	210 lb (95 kg)	2005-07-27	France
F	51	Mohamed Diawara	6 ft 9 in (2.06 m)	225 lb (102 kg)	2005-04-29	France
F	3	Josh Hart	6 ft 5 in (1.96 m)	215 lb (98 kg)	1995-03-06	Villanova
C	55	Ariel Hukporti	7 ft 0 in (2.13 m)	246 lb (112 kg)	2002-04-12	Germany
C	50	Trey Jemison (TW)	6 ft 10 in (2.08 m)	270 lb (122 kg)	1999-11-28	UAB
F	1	Dillon Jones (TW)	6 ft 5 in (1.96 m)	235 lb (107 kg)	2001-10-29	Weber State
G	13	Tyler Kolek	6 ft 2 in (1.88 m)	195 lb (88 kg)	2001-03-27	Marquette
G	2	Miles McBride	6 ft 2 in (1.88 m)	195 lb (88 kg)	2000-09-08	West Virginia
G	9	Kevin McCullar Jr. (TW)	6 ft 6 in (1.98 m)	210 lb (95 kg)	2001-03-15	Kansas
C	23	Mitchell Robinson	7 ft 0 in (2.13 m)	240 lb (109 kg)	1998-04-01	Chalmette HS (LA)
G	44	Landry Shamet	6 ft 5 in (1.96 m)	190 lb (86 kg)	1997-03-13	Wichita State
F	20	Jeremy Sochan	6 ft 8 in (2.03 m)	230 lb (104 kg)	2003-05-20	Baylor
F/C	32	Karl-Anthony Towns	7 ft 0 in (2.13 m)	248 lb (112 kg)	1995-11-15	Kentucky

Coaches
Head coach
- Mike Brown
Assistant(s)
- Charles Allen
- Rick Brunson
- Mark Bryant
- Maurice Cheeks
- Darren Erman
- Riccardo Fois
- Chris Jent (associate HC)
- Billy Lange
- Brendan O'Connor

Legend
- (DP) Unsigned draft pick
- (FA) Free agent
- (S) Suspended
- (GL) On assignment to G League affiliate
- (TW) Two-way affiliate player
- Injured

Roster
Updated: February 16, 2026

=== San Antonio Spurs ===
2025–26 San Antonio Spurs roster
Players

Pos.	No.	Player	Height	Weight	DOB	From
F	40	Harrison Barnes	6 ft 7 in (2.01 m)	225 lb (102 kg)	1992-05-30	North Carolina
C	18	Bismack Biyombo	6 ft 8 in (2.03 m)	255 lb (116 kg)	1992-08-28	Democratic Republic of the Congo
F	11	Carter Bryant	6 ft 6 in (1.98 m)	220 lb (100 kg)	2005-11-26	Arizona
G	5	Stephon Castle	6 ft 6 in (1.98 m)	215 lb (98 kg)	2004-11-01	Connecticut
F	30	Julian Champagnie	6 ft 7 in (2.01 m)	217 lb (98 kg)	2001-06-29	St. John's
G	4	De'Aaron Fox	6 ft 3 in (1.91 m)	185 lb (84 kg)	1997-12-20	Kentucky
G	2	Dylan Harper	6 ft 5 in (1.96 m)	215 lb (98 kg)	2006-03-02	Rutgers
F	55	Harrison Ingram (TW)	6 ft 5 in (1.96 m)	230 lb (104 kg)	2002-11-27	North Carolina
G/F	3	Keldon Johnson	6 ft 6 in (1.98 m)	220 lb (100 kg)	1999-10-11	Kentucky
G	25	David Jones García (TW)	6 ft 4 in (1.93 m)	210 lb (95 kg)	2001-11-24	Memphis
F/C	7	Luke Kornet	7 ft 1 in (2.16 m)	250 lb (113 kg)	1995-07-15	Vanderbilt
G	0	Jordan McLaughlin	5 ft 11 in (1.80 m)	185 lb (84 kg)	1996-04-09	USC
F	14	Emanuel Miller (TW)	6 ft 5 in (1.96 m)	215 lb (98 kg)	2000-06-19	TCU
F/C	8	Kelly Olynyk	7 ft 0 in (2.13 m)	240 lb (109 kg)	1991-04-19	Gonzaga
F/C	45	Mason Plumlee	7 ft 0 in (2.13 m)	254 lb (115 kg)	1990-03-05	Duke
G/F	24	Devin Vassell	6 ft 5 in (1.96 m)	200 lb (91 kg)	2000-08-23	Florida State
F	43	Lindy Waters III	6 ft 5 in (1.96 m)	210 lb (95 kg)	1997-07-28	Oklahoma State
F/C	1	Victor Wembanyama	7 ft 4 in (2.24 m)	235 lb (107 kg)	2004-01-04	France

Coaches
Head coach
- Mitch Johnson
Assistant(s)
- Jimmy Baron
- Josh Brannon
- Brett Brown
- Scott King
- Tim Martin
- Matthew Nielsen
- Mike Noyes
- Sean Sweeney (associate HC)
- L. D. Williams
- Corliss Williamson

Legend
- (DP) Unsigned draft pick
- (FA) Free agent
- (S) Suspended
- (GL) On assignment to G League affiliate
- (TW) Two-way affiliate player
- Injured

Roster
Updated: February 17, 2026

== Player statistics ==
Legend
GP	Games played	GS	Games started	MPG	Minutes per game
FG%	Field-goal percentage	3P%	3-point field-goal percentage	FT%	Free-throw percentage
RPG	Rebounds per game	APG	Assists per game	SPG	Steals per game
BPG	Blocks per game	PPG	Points per game

New York Knicks statistics
Player	GP	GS	MPG	FG%	3P%	FT%	RPG	APG	SPG	BPG	PPG
Jalen Brunson	5	5	**39.2**	.421	.389	.860	4.2	4.6	**2.0**	0.0	**32.6**
OG Anunoby	5	5	36.0	**.525**	**.500**	.867	4.8	1.0	1.4	**1.4**	21.2
Karl-Anthony Towns	5	5	31.0	.490	.333	**1.000**	**10.6**	2.4	1.4	1.0	13.0
Mikal Bridges	5	5	32.9	.465	.421	.667	3.6	3.4	0.6	0.4	10.4
Josh Hart	5	5	30.4	.382	.400	.571	9.8	**4.6**	1.4	0.4	7.6
Landry Shamet	5	0	24.1	.333	.308	—	2.0	1.0	0.0	0.4	6.8
Jose Alvarado	5	0	12.1	.333	.250	.667	2.6	1.4	0.2	0.0	4.2
Mitchell Robinson	5	0	13.4	.500	—	.267	5.6	0.6	0.2	0.6	3.6
Jordan Clarkson	4	0	7.4	.375	.333	—	1.5	0.3	0.3	0.0	3.5
Miles McBride	5	0	13.3	.182	.176	—	0.6	1.4	0.0	0.2	2.2
Ariel Hukporti	2	0	2.7	—	—	—	0.5	0.5	0.0	1.0	0.0
Jeremy Sochan	3	0	1.1	.000	—	—	0.0	0.0	0.0	0.0	0.0

San Antonio Spurs statistics
Player	GP	GS	MPG	FG%	3P%	FT%	RPG	APG	SPG	BPG	PPG
Victor Wembanyama	5	5	**39.2**	.423	.273	.786	**11.2**	2.6	1.0	**3.6**	**26.0**
Stephon Castle	5	5	31.6	.377	.300	.808	5.4	4.2	0.6	0.2	14.6
De'Aaron Fox	5	5	36.5	.343	.250	**.900**	3.0	**6.0**	**1.4**	0.8	12.8
Devin Vassell	5	5	38.3	.537	.467	.857	6.8	2.8	0.6	0.4	12.8
Julian Champagnie	5	5	31.5	.409	.405	.667	5.4	1.8	1.2	0.4	11.0
Dylan Harper	5	0	31.0	.493	.280	.765	6.4	3.0	0.4	0.2	18.0
Keldon Johnson	5	0	15.0	.348	.375	.375	3.0	0.6	0.6	0.0	4.4
Carter Bryant	5	0	4.5	**.600**	**.667**	.500	0.6	0.0	0.2	0.2	1.8
Luke Kornet	5	0	8.3	.000	—	.750	2.2	0.4	0.8	0.0	0.6
Harrison Barnes	2	0	8.5	.000	.000	.000	1.0	0.5	0.0	0.0	0.0

- Bold: team high

== Media coverage ==
The Finals was televised in the United States by ABC (including owned-and-operated station WABC-TV in New York City and local affiliate KSAT-TV in San Antonio) for the 24th consecutive year. It was called by the team of play-by-play announcer Mike Breen (who was the Knicks' lead television announcer on MSG Network during the regular season), analysts Richard Jefferson and Tim Legler, and sideline reporter Lisa Salters. Breen called his record-extending 21st NBA Finals series on television. The series was carried on ESPN Radio, with play-by-play announcer Marc Kestecher, analysts Doris Burke (whom Legler replaced on the television broadcast team), P. J. Carlesimo, and sideline reporter Jorge Sedano. ESPN had an alternative broadcast of game 3 hosted by Pat McAfee, College GameDay analyst and host of The Pat McAfee Show. ESPN Unlimited streamed the ABC broadcasts, the game 3 alternative broadcast, the ESPN Radio broadcasts, both the Knicks and Spurs local radio broadcasts, and alternative "Layup Lines" and "SkyCam" views.

This was the first year under a sub-licensing agreement with TNT Sports's Inside the NBA to produce pregame, halftime, and postgame coverage for ABC's broadcasts, with Ernie Johnson, Shaquille O'Neal, Kenny Smith, and Charles Barkley. Draymond Green joined them as a guest analyst for games 3 and 4. In deference to local news or other programming on ABC stations, the pregame show began on ESPN at 7 p.m. ET before switching to ABC at 8 p.m. ET. Postgame coverage was likewise on ESPN, except for game 5 in the Saturday night slot, in which ABC carried a half hour of the postgame and the Larry O'Brien Championship Trophy presentation.

ABC, which had received criticism for its coverage the previous year, was praised by viewers and sportswriters for emphasizing the "pageantry" and magnitude of the NBA Finals. Sports media website Awful Announcing praised the inclusion of the Larry O'Brien Championship Trophy featured on center court, the traditional NBA Finals script in the frontcourt on each end, and broadcasting the national anthem and introduction of starting lineups.

=== Viewership ===
The 2026 NBA Finals were the most-watched NBA finals since the 1998 Finals, with an average of 20.6 million viewers per a game. The game viewership ranged from 16.93 million viewers to 24.54 million viewers.

Game 1 was the most-watched NBA Finals game 1 since the 1998 Finals, with a total of 16.93 million viewers, peaking at 19.63 million at 11 p.m. ET. It marked a 90% viewership increase compared to 2025's game 1 and became the most watched NBA Finals game since game 6 of the 2019 Finals.

Game 2 averaged 16.43 million viewers and viewership was up 88% compared to 2025's game 2.

Game 3 was the most-watched NBA Finals game 3 since the 1998 Finals, with a total of 23.79 million viewers. Viewership increased by 159% from 2025's game 3 and became the most watched NBA Finals game since game 5 of the 2017 Finals.

Game 4 was the most-watched NBA Finals game 4 since the 1998 Finals, averaging 20.94 million viewers.

Game 5 was the most-watched NBA Finals game 5 since 1998, averaging 24.54 million viewers and peaking at 33 million at 11:15 p.m. ET.

Game	Ratings (American households)	American audience (in millions)	Ref
1	8.2	16.93	
2	7.7	16.43	
3	10.9	23.79	
4	10.1	20.94	
5	10.3	24.54	
Avg	9.4	20.58	

== Historical notes ==
- The Knicks ended their 53-year title drought, while also becoming the eighth consecutive unique champion and the first team to win an NBA Finals and NBA Cup in the same season.
  - The Knicks now hold the record for the longest period between two titles at 53 years with their last win in 1973. This beats the Milwaukee Bucks record of 50 years back in 2021 when they won their previous title back in 1971.
- The 2026 Spurs became the first franchise since the 1993 Phoenix Suns to lose all of their home games despite homecourt advantage, dropping Games 1, 2, and 5 at the Frost Bank Center.
- The Knicks were the first team to win an NBA championship while trailing by double-digits in each four of their wins. They trailed by as much as 14 in Game 1, 12 in Game 2, 29 in Game 4, and 16 in Game 5.
- Karl-Anthony Towns established the NBA single-postseason record for total plus–minus with a +258, surpassing Steph Curry (+245, 2017).
- The New York Knicks averaged an NBA playoff record +14.9 margin of victory, surpassing the 1970–71 Milwaukee Bucks (14.5).
- The New York Knicks accumulated a +283 point differential, surpassing the previous NBA playoff recorded by the 2016–17 Golden State Warriors (+230).
- The New York Knicks tied a record with 12 double digit wins.
- OG Anunoby established an NBA single-postseason record 67.2% effective field goal percentage (min 150 attempts).
- Since play-by-play data began in the 1996–97 NBA season, the Knicks 6–2 record in games in which they trailed by at least 10 points is an NBA record.
- As of 2026, Brunson established an NBA record with a career playoff scoring average 6.8 points above his career regular season scoring average (min 50 playoff games).
- Brunson became the eighth player to win the NBA Finals MVP after winning an NCAA Division I men's basketball tournament and fourth of those to have also won state high school championship, joining Kareem Abdul-Jabbar, Bill Walton, and Magic Johnson.
- Jalen and Rick Brunson became the first father-son duo to win an NBA championship together on the same team with one as a player and the other on the coaching staff.

== Reactions ==
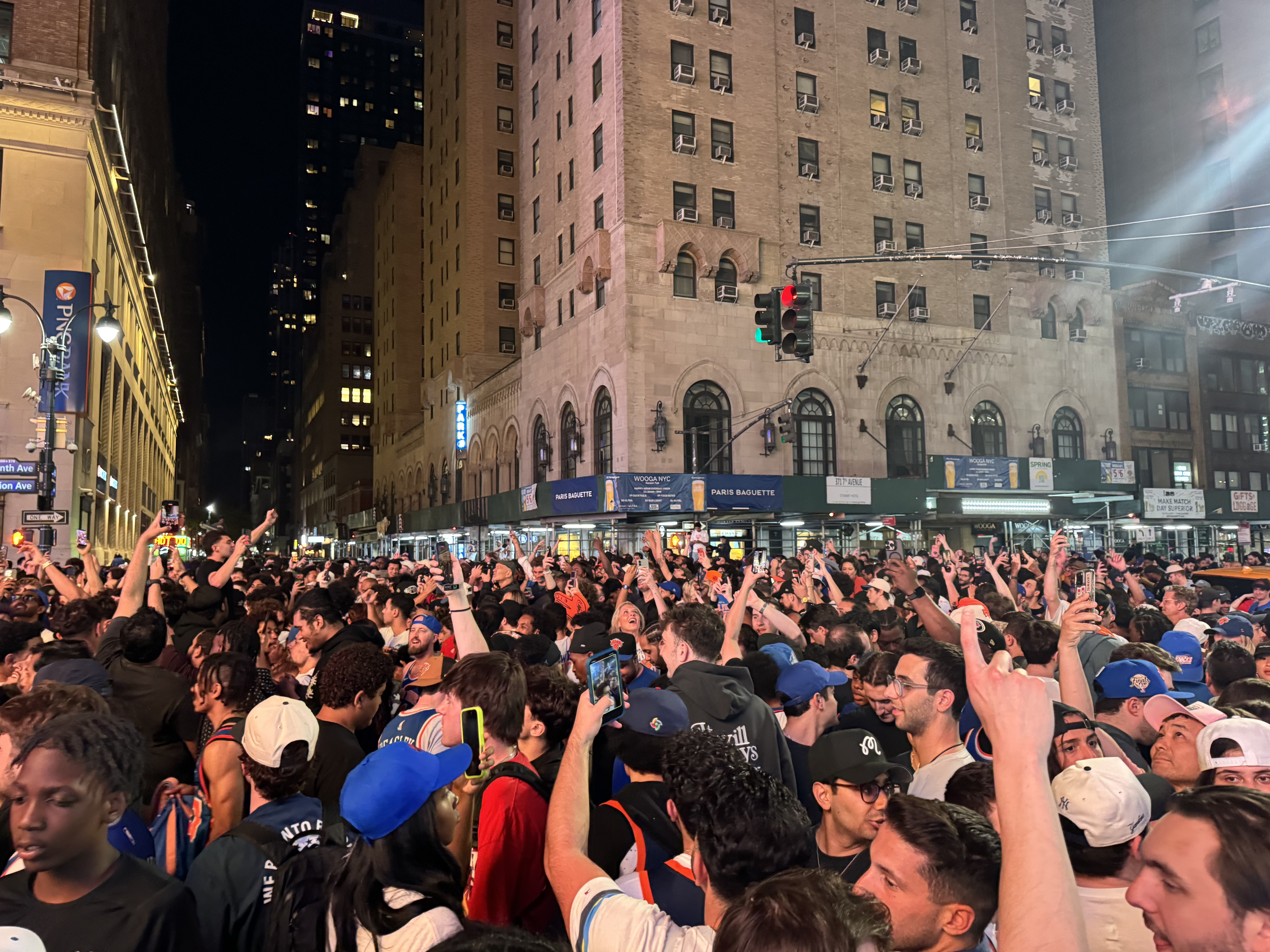
Fans gather at a Knicks' game 1 watch party at 7th Ave and 31st Street.

The Knicks championship run was celebrated all across the five boroughs of New York City, uniting the city. The reaction was referred to as "euphoria" and the clinching game received an overwhelmingly emotional response from the city, with many fans breaking down in tears. On the night the team won the championship, fans sang New York anthems, Frank Sinatra's "Theme from New York, New York", as well as Alicia Keys' and Jay-Z's "Empire State of Mind".

=== Viral chants ===
One four-line chant, popularized by 23-year-old Knicks fan Ahnaf Hossain, went viral ahead of the Finals:

My mayor Muslim
My bagel's Jewish
My Christian Dior (Note: Wordplay on "Dior", the 2020 song by rapper Pop Smoke, as well as Christianity being one of the three main Abrahamic religions)
Knicks in four

Then, after the Knicks lost game 3, the chant was modified:

My mayor Muslim
My bagel's Jewish
The pope's on our side (Note: Coincidentally, Pope Leo XIV, Jalen Brunson, and two of Brunson's teammates (Josh Hart and Mikal Bridges) share the same alma mater: Villanova University. "The pope hates AI" has also been used occasionally as a variation of this line.)
Knicks in five

The chant was further propelled in a marketing video by Kalshi, though Ahnaf says he approached Kalshi's team voluntarily, attracted to their green microphone. Mayor Zohran Mamdani acknowledged the chant as interviewed on MS NOW saying: "there are a lot of people who have been running up to me over the last few weeks just shouting at me, 'My mayor's Muslim!' [...] It's true, I am."

Head coach Mike Brown celebrated the win by chanting the chorus to "Who Let the Dogs Out" by the Baha Men during the trophy presentation.

=== Celebrated events ===
Mayor Zohran Mamdani's celebratory speech at the City Hall ceremony

A day after their championship win, Jose Alvarado and Jordan Clarkson were celebrated at the city's Puerto Rican Day Parade. Alvarado, a Brooklyn native, played for the Puerto Rican men's national team at the 2024 Olympics in Paris.

New York City held a ticker-tape parade for the Knicks on Thursday, June 18, at the Canyon of Heroes, followed by a ceremony at City Hall. This was the team's first ticker-tape parade, as then-Mayor John Lindsay opted to host an informal ceremony for the team at Gracie Mansion due to political and social concerns of the time in the early 1970s. An estimated 2 million fans attended the celebration, and many were turned away hours before the procession began as lower Manhattan reached maximum capacity. Mayor Zohran Mamdani awarded the team a key to the city.

Shortly before the start of the next season, Jalen Brunson was the guest host for the September 26 season premiere of Saturday Night Live (SNL) alongside musical guest KATSEYE. It marked the fifth time an NBA-connected athlete (Bill Russell, Michael Jordan, Charles Barkley and LeBron James) and fourth time an active NBA player hosted the show.

=== Fan violence ===
Some celebrations were marred by several incidents of fan violence. According to the New York City Police Department, 17 people were arrested after game 2, 20 after game 3, and 56 after game 4, with reports of a taxi driver being pulled from his car and sustaining injuries, a police officer being punched, and multiple assaults in Bryant Park, including a Spurs fan who was beaten by a mob and had his jersey ripped off and fans attacking a Five Guys employee/Spurs fan. After game 5, in a radio interview, Mayor Zohran Mamdani stated: "We've said time and time again, there's no tolerance for attacking individuals on the street, for violence." Citing concerns over possible fan violence, a watch party outside Madison Square Garden was capped to 1,000 fans by the City of New York and later cancelled prior to game 4.

After game 4, outside of Madison Square Garden, a 17-year-old was beaten by a group of people and briefly went into a coma. He was taken to a local hospital and was expected to survive. After the Knicks won the series in game 5, there were sporadic reports of violence in Manhattan. The New York Police Department said in a statement that the crowds became "increasingly destructive" throughout the night with many incidents of "incredibly reckless and dangerous behavior" occurring. Later in the night, a 17-year-old boy was shot in the foot by a stray bullet. There were also reports of five school buses (previously used to shuttle fans to a World Cup match between Brazil and Morocco earlier in the day) being set alight and destroyed by baseball bats by fans who later climbed on top of the destroyed buses. Other fan violence after game 5 included four stabbings, police officers being struck by bottles or punched in the face, police cars being damaged, and private vehicles and property being damaged. There were 10 police officers injured and 63 people arrested after game 5.

Hours after the team's celebratory parade, a shooting occurred near 42nd Street and Broadway; no one was injured and the suspect was quickly arrested.

== See also ==
- 2026 NBA playoffs
