= Church of St. Nicholas, Tomaszów Lubelski =

Orthodox church in Tomaszów Lubelski, Poland

Church of St. Nicholas
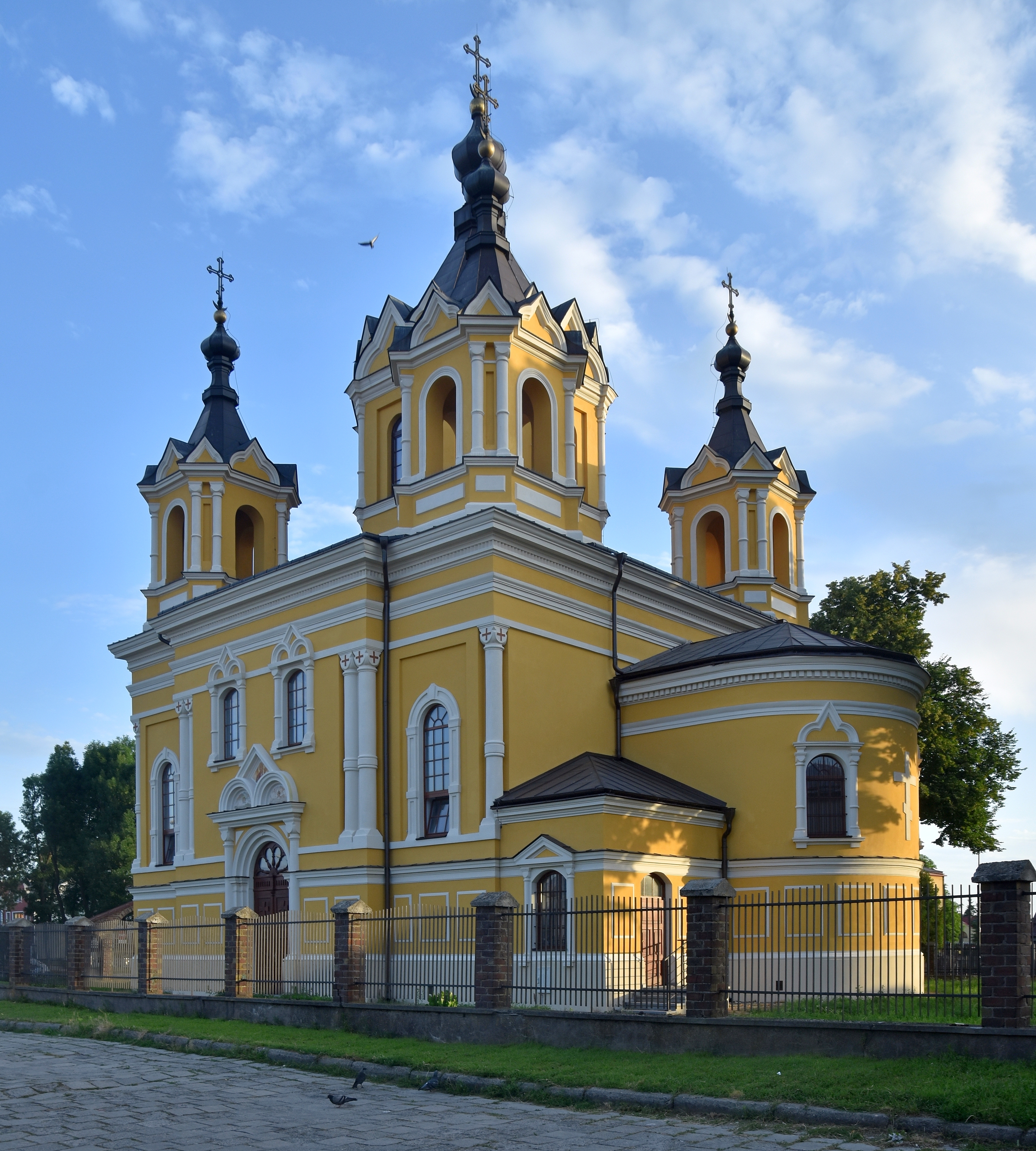
- General view of the church
- Church of St. Nicholas
- 50°27′11.8″N 23°25′14.6″E
- Location: Tomaszów Lubelski
- Country: Poland
- Denomination: Eastern Orthodoxy
- Churchmanship: Polish Orthodox Church

History
- Status: active Orthodox church
- Dedication: Saint Nicholas

Architecture
- Style: Russian Revival
- Completed: 1890

Specifications
- Materials: brick

Administration
- Diocese: Diocese of Lublin and Chełm

The Church of St. Nicholas is an Orthodox parish church in Tomaszów Lubelski. It belongs to the Zamość Deanery of the Diocese of Lublin and Chełm of the Polish Orthodox Church. The church is located on the eastern side of the Market Square.

An Orthodox parish existed in Tomaszów as early as the first half of the 16th century. In the 17th century, the first church of this denomination was built, dedicated to St. Nicholas. In the following century, this church was taken over by the Uniates and remained under their ownership until the Conversion of Chełm Eparchy in 1875. A new church, built in the Russian Revival style, was constructed between 1885 and 1890 using state funds allocated by the Russian government for such purposes.

The church remained continuously open during World War I, the interwar period, and World War II. Pastoral activities were interrupted only by Operation Vistula and the forced resettlement of Orthodox Ukrainians from Tomaszów. Until 1957, the abandoned church was used by dairy plants and gradually fell into disrepair. That year, the Orthodox parish in Tomaszów Lubelski was reinstated, and a provisional renovation of the building was carried out. More extensive restoration work took place in the late 1980s and early 21st century.

From 1983 to 1990, the church housed the Turkowice Icon of the Mother of God.

== History ==
=== First Church of St. Nicholas in Tomaszów ===
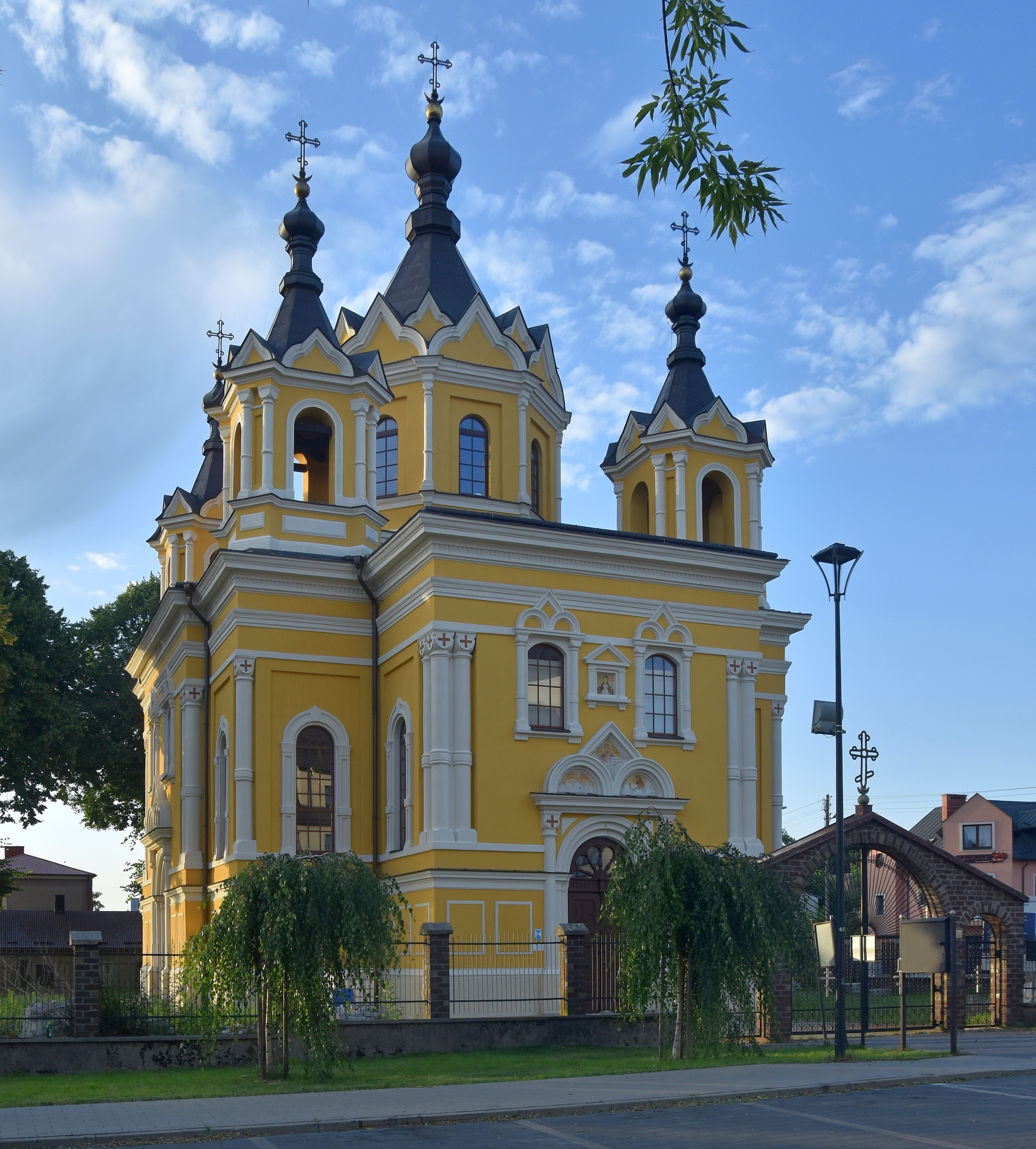
Front elevation

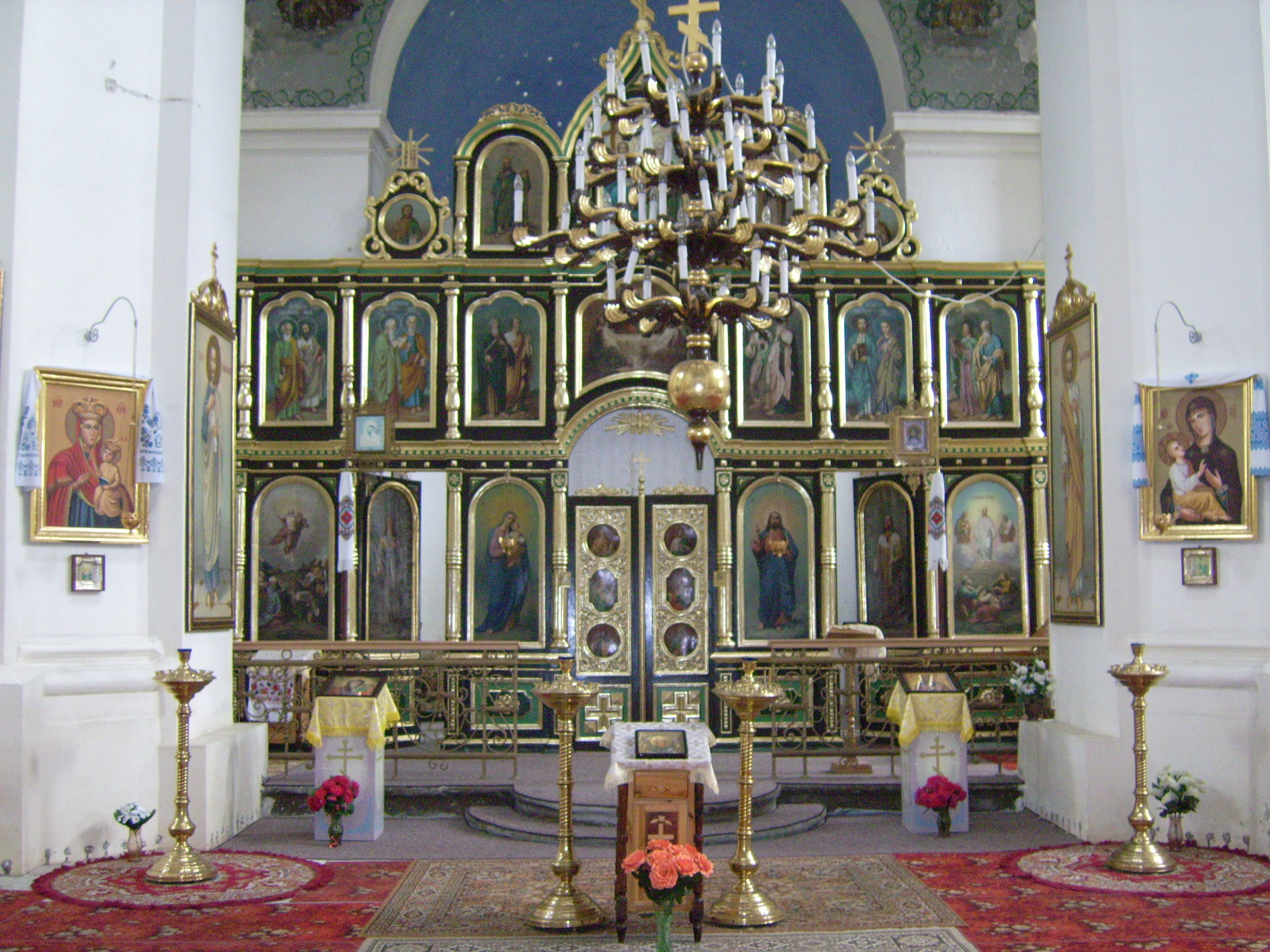
Interior of the church

The earliest records of Orthodox Christians in present-day Tomaszów and their church date back to 1531. That year, tax documents mentioned a parish church dedicated to St. Michael the Archangel in the Rogóźno suburb. By the mid-17th century, there were three Orthodox churches in Tomaszów: St. George's, located on Świętojurska Street at the end of Starocerkiewna Street; the Dormition of the Most Holy Theotokos, situated in the Szczebrzeszyn suburb; and St. Nicholas, located in the Lwów suburb.

The Church of St. Nicholas was built by Father Ivan Gurkowicz on land granted to him by Jan Ossoliński and Mateusz Leśniewski, in exchange for an older church that had been taken from the Orthodox parish and given to the Uniates after the Union of Brest. From 1689, it served as the parish church. The Orthodox parish was abolished by 1789 at the latest, leading the local faithful to convert to Uniatism. The Church of St. Nicholas then became a filial church of St. George's, which had followed the Uniate rite since the previous century.

The Uniate parish in Tomaszów Lubelski was incorporated into the Russian Orthodox Church following the Conversion of Chełm Eparchy in 1875. Between 1885 and 1890, a new church was designed for the community and built in the Russian Revival style.

=== Construction of the present church and its operation until 1947 ===
The church was built using state funds under the supervision of Gabriel Arbuzov and Konstantin Drozdowski. It was dedicated in 1890, while the older Church of St. Nicholas remained standing until 1904, when it was demolished. At that time, the Orthodox parish in Tomaszów Lubelski had 2,761 members. In addition to the parishioners, the church was also used by soldiers stationed in Tomaszów and by units guarding the Russian-Austrian border. The iconostasis for the church was created in the workshop of Kuzma Morozov in Moscow. In 1899, the church was visited by Bishop German of Lublin.

The church was not closed during World War I, even though most Orthodox pastoral centers ceased to function due to the evacuation of clergy and faithful deep into Russia. After Poland regained independence, the Ministry of Religious Affairs and Public Education included the Tomaszów church in the 1919 list of Orthodox sacred sites planned for reopening. By 1923, it was one of 12 active Orthodox churches in Tomaszów County and belonged to a parish within the Tomaszów Deanery of the Diocese of Warsaw and Chełm of the Polish Orthodox Church.

=== After Operation Vistula ===
The church in Tomaszów Lubelski remained open during World War II but was closed following the deportation of Orthodox Ukrainians during Operation Vistula. Abandoned, it was repurposed as a cooperative warehouse, and for a time, it even housed a public restroom. In 1955, Metropolitan Macarius of Warsaw and all Poland sought to reopen the church as a filial parish of the Cathedral of the Transfiguration in Lublin, but the Office for Religious Affairs denied the request. The building remained under the administration of the County Dairy Plants. Two years later, another petition from the metropolitan was approved, reflecting a general relaxation of government policy toward Orthodoxy. The severely damaged Tomaszów church regained its status as a parish church, and local believers (about 550 people in total) voluntarily undertook its restoration. By 1969, however, the church was no longer listed as a parish church but as a filial church of the parish in Hrubieszów. The church was robbed in the 1970s.

A major renovation took place between 1983 and 1985, allowing the building to be restored for liturgical purposes. The number of regular worshippers is estimated at a few dozen, though Tomaszów is home to as many as 300 baptized members of the Orthodox Church.

The church was entered into the register of historic monuments on 24 August 1979 under number A/194.

At the beginning of the 21st century, the church underwent a thorough renovation. Funded by the Ministry of Culture, the city authorities, the county office, and the Marshal's Office of the Lublin Voivodeship, the restoration included replacing the structure and covering of the nave's roof, impregnating wooden roof elements, and installing new gutters. Additionally, a private donor from Greece gifted the marble needed for a new floor. Previously, the church's five domes had been restored, including roof replacement, cross and sphere repairs, and façade plaster renovation. Since November 2012, the entire church has been illuminated.

== Architecture ==
The church in Tomaszów Lubelski was built in an eclectic style that combines elements of late classicism with the official Russian Revival style. It is a cross-domed, nine-bay structure. The building is topped with five octagonal roof lanterns positioned over the bays between the arms of the cross and in its central part. The lanterns are finished with tented roofs. The structure is tripartite, with the chancel enclosed by a semicircular apse. The church porch was built on a rectangular plan.

The Tomaszów Lubelski church is one of the last religious buildings in Congress Poland to be constructed with Russian state funds in the older Russian Revival style developed by Konstantin Thon, rather than its later variant based on the imitation of 16th-century Moscow and Yaroslavl churches.

Originally, the church's interior featured frescoes depicting biblical scenes, but these were destroyed in the second half of the 20th century.

=== Turkowice Icon of the Mother of God ===
In 1983, a copy of the Turkowice Icon of the Mother of God was transferred to the Tomaszów Lubelski church. The icon had been found in a ruined Orthodox chapel in Turkowice. It remained in the church until 1990, when it was moved to the St. Onuphrius Monastery in Jabłeczna. According to Grzegorz Kuprianowicz, this happened because local Catholics demanded that the icon be transferred to a nearby Catholic church, and there were concerns that it might be stolen from the Orthodox church.

In July 1995, the first celebrations in honor of the Turkowice Icon of the Mother of God since the interwar period were held in the Tomaszów church. These ceremonies were attended by Polish Orthodox Church faithful as well as pilgrims from Ukraine. The church remained the center of veneration for the icon until 1998 when the main celebrations were moved to the Church of the Dormition of the Mother of God in Hrubieszów. Since 2010, the revived Monastery of Holy Mother of God in Turkowice has been the primary site of the feast.
