= Zygmunt Sochan =

Polish footballer (1909–1998)

Personal information
- Date of birth: 24 December 1909
- Place of birth: Tomaszów Lubelski
- Date of death: 5 February 1998 (aged 88)
- Place of death: Warsaw
- Height: 1.74 m (5 ft 9 in)
- Position: Midfielder

Youth career
- Tomasovia Tomaszów Lubelski

Senior career*
Years	Team	Apps	(Gls)
1930–1939	Warszawianka	94	(4)
1946–1947	Orzeł Warsaw		
- * Club domestic league appearances and goals

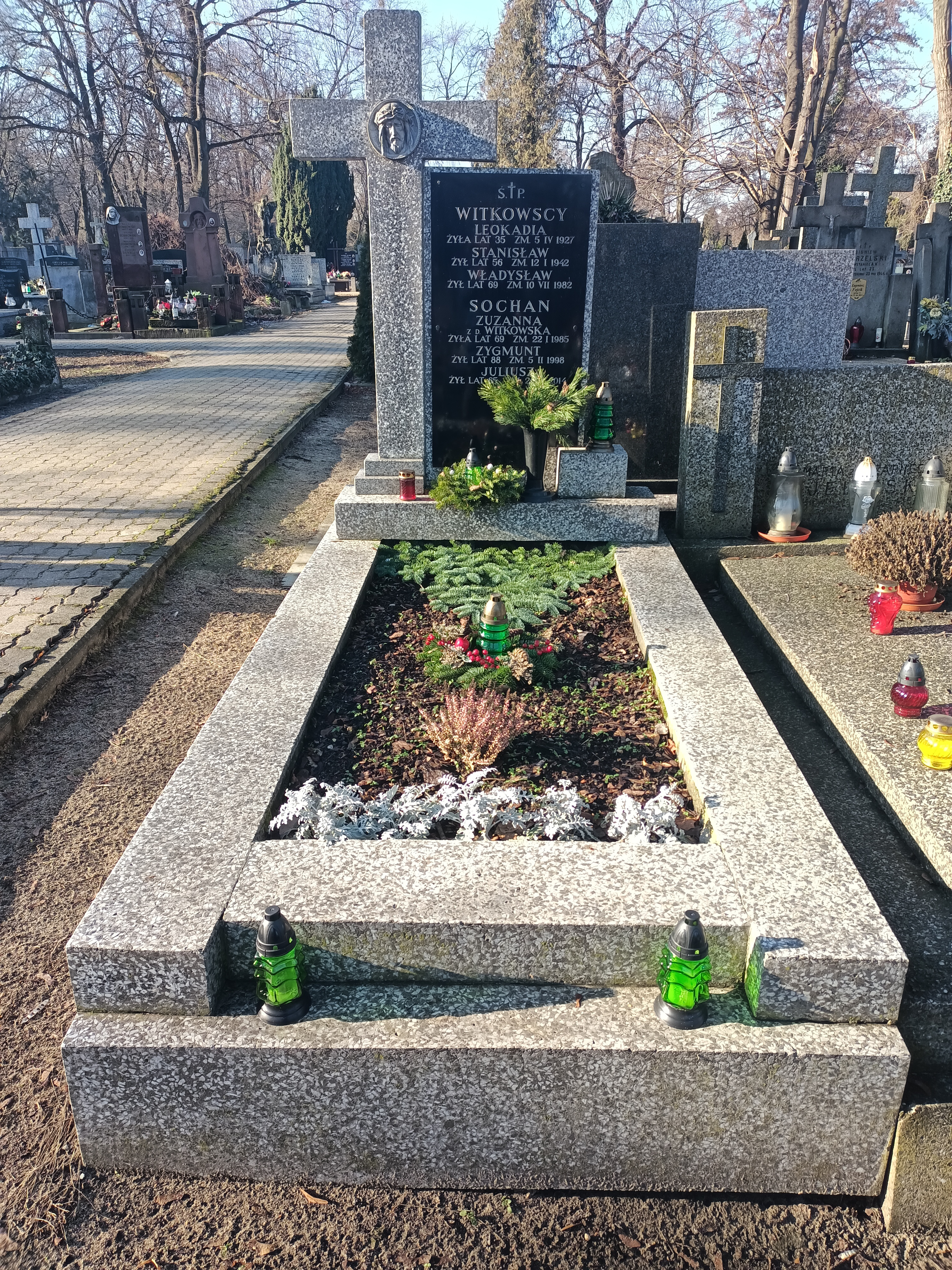
Sochan's grave, Bródno Cemetery, Warsaw

Zygmunt Sochan (24 December 1909 – 5 February 1998) was a Polish footballer who played as a midfielder, manager, and member of the Polish resistance movement in World War II.

== Early life ==
Sochan was born and grew up in Tomaszów Lubelski. In his youth, he played football in the school club Burza Tomaszów Lubelski, which was soon renamed to Znicz Tomaszów Lubelski and then absorbed by the town's leading football club Tomasovia Tomaszów Lubelski. He also participated in regional athletic competitions.

== Club career ==
In 1929, he moved to the top division team Warszawianka, based in Warsaw. At first he mostly played in its reserve team. He made his league debut in 1932 in a lost match with Polonia Warsaw. After 1934 he played regularly for Warszawianka, and from 1936 until 1939 he was the team captain. From 1932 to 1939, he made 94 appearances and scored 4 goals in the Ekstraklasa (Polish top division). In 1939, his career was halted due to the outbreak of World War II. After the war, he initially joined Syrena Warsaw, and in 1946-1947, he was a player-coach at Orzeł Warsaw.

== International career ==
In 1935 Sochan was called up to the Poland national team for a match with Latvia, however, he did not make an appearance.

== World War II ==
In September 1939, Sochan fought in Poland's defense during the joint German-Soviet invasion that began World War II. Afterwards he was a member of the underground Polish resistance in occupied Poland. Despite occupation, he continued playing football by participating in secret Polish games in Warsaw, representing Warszawianka and Okęcie Warsaw. He was eventually imprisoned by the Germans in the Stutthof concentration camp.

== Managerial career ==
After retiring as a player, he continued to manage Orzeł Warsaw for many years.

== Personal life ==
His son was Juliusz Sochan, director of the basketball section of AZS AWF Warsaw and the president of the Warsaw Regional Basketball Association. His granddaughter is Aneta Sochan, former Polish basketball player who played for Polonia Warsaw. His great-grandson is Jeremy Sochan, basketball player for the Poland national team and NBA team New York Knicks.
