= Paulina Mikuła =

Polish television presenter and internet personality (born 1988)

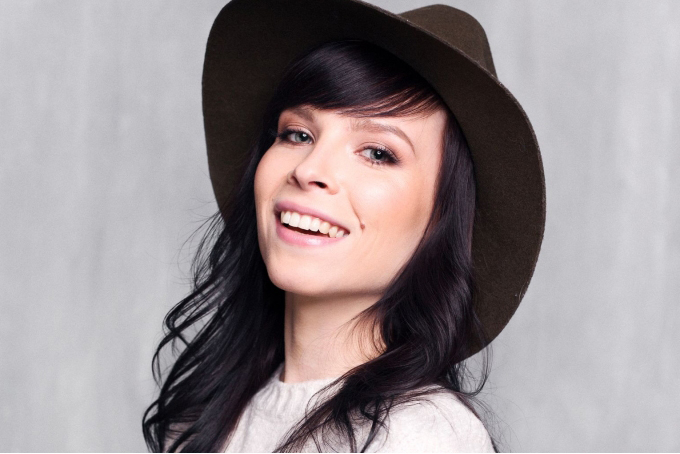
- Paulina Mikuła, 2016
- Born: 30 June 1988 (age 38); Tomaszów Lubelski, Poland
- Education: Warsaw University
- Occupations: Internet personality, author, TV presenter, manager
- Years active: 2013–present
- Website: mowiacinaczej.pl

Paulina Mikuła (born 30 June 1988 in Tomaszów Lubelski) is a Polish television presenter, Internet personality, and popularizer of Polish language knowledge.

== Education and early career ==
She graduated in Polish studies from Warsaw University. In 2013, she created the vlog channel Mówiąc Inaczej (in cooperation with LifeTube), where she explains how to speak Polish in line with its standard language norms. In 2016, Mikuła wrote the usage guide Mówiąc inaczej published by Flow Books. In 2019, her YouTube channel reached over 435,000 subscribers.

== Television career ==
At the end of 2016, Mikuła with Anna Gacek hosted the first edition of the program Bake Off - Ale ciacho on TVP2.

== Influence ==
It is said that the main consequence of her activity is the growing number of young people who show interest in the Polish language and its prescribed norms, and their increased willingness to work and develop their way of speaking Polish.

== Awards and nominations ==
=== Individual ===
Year	Ceremony	Category	Result	Ref
2016	Gwiazdy Plejady (Pleiades stars)	The star of Internet	Nominated	

=== Mówiąc Inaczej ===
Year	Ceremony	Category	Result	Ref
2015	Glamour: Kobieta Roku (Woman of the Year)	Kobieta Roku Online	Nominated	
2017	Mistrz Mowy Polskiej (lit. Master of Polish Speech)	Kuźnia Mistrzów Mowy Polskiej	Won	
