= Moshe Wertman =

Israeli politician (1924–2011)

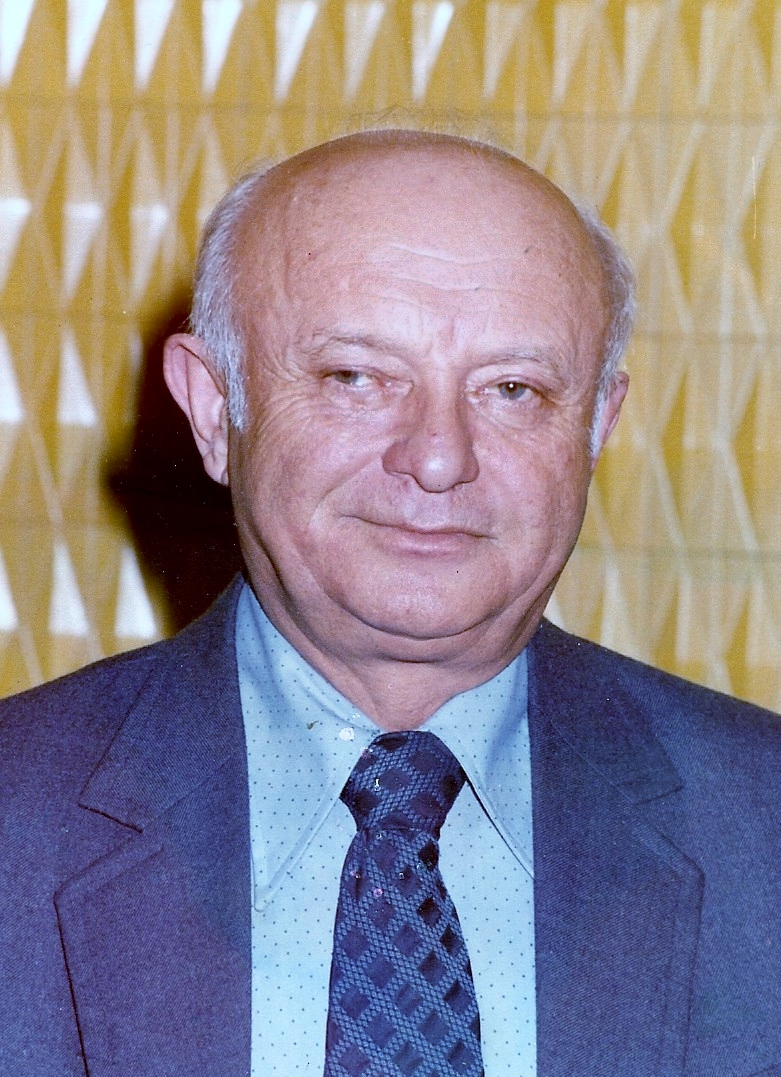

Faction represented in the Knesset
- 1966–1968: Alignment
- 1968–1969: Labor Party
- 1969–1977: Alignment

Personal details
- Born: 20 February 1924 Tomaszów Lubelski, Poland
- Died: 2 October 2011 (aged 87) Haifa, Israel

Moshe Wertman (Hebrew: משה ורטמן; 20 February 1924 – 2 October 2011) was an Israeli politician who served as a member of the Knesset for the Alignment and Labor Party between 1966 and 1977.

== Biography ==
Born in Tomaszów Lubelski in Poland, Wertman joined Hashomer Hatzair in 1936, and was also a member of the Dror youth movement and Poalei Zion. In 1939 he moved to Lviv, before moving again to Tajikistan the following year, where he lived until 1946, when he returned to Poland.

In 1947 he emigrated to Mandatory Palestine, where he joined the Haganah. In April 1948 he was injured during the battle for the Western Galilee. In the same year he joined Mapai, and served as secretary for the trade unions in Haifa Workers Council between 1949 and 1955, when he became Director of the branches department, a role he held until 1959. Between 1959 and 1969 he served as a member of the workers council's secretariat. In 1964 he became secretary of Mapai's Haifa district branch, and was on the Alignment list (an alliance of Mapai and Ahdut HaAvoda) for the Knesset elections the following year. Although he failed to win a seat, he entered the Knesset on 17 January 1966 as a replacement for Moshe Carmel, who had given up his seat after being appointed Minister of Transport. He was re-elected in 1969 and 1973, but lost his seat in the 1977 election. During his time in the Knesset he served as chairman of the Alignment faction and chaired the governing coalition's directorate.
