= Jeremy Sochan =

Polish-American basketball player (born 2003)

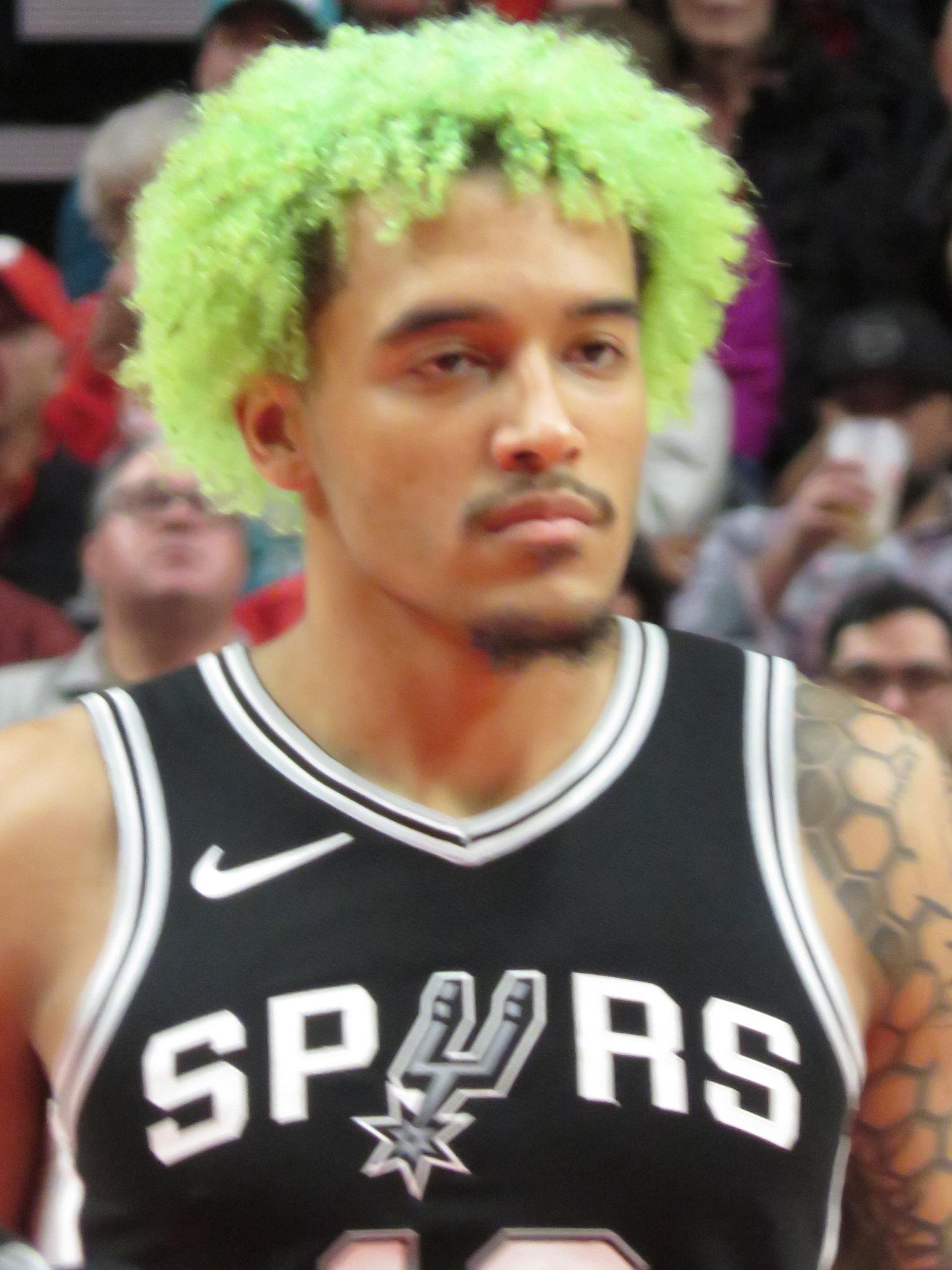
- Sochan with the San Antonio Spurs in 2024

No. 10 – Texas Legends
- Position: Power forward
- League: NBA G League

Personal information
- Born: May 20, 2003 (age 23) Guymon, Oklahoma, U.S.
- Listed height: 6 ft 8 in (2.03 m)
- Listed weight: 230 lb (104 kg)

Career information
- High school: Itchen College (Southampton, Hampshire); La Lumiere School (La Porte, Indiana)
- College: Baylor (2021–2022)
- NBA draft: 2022: 1st round, 9th overall pick
- Drafted by: San Antonio Spurs
- Playing career: 2020–present

Career history
- 2020–2022: OrangeAcademy
- 2022–2026: San Antonio Spurs
- 2026: New York Knicks
- 2026–present: Texas Legends

Career highlights
- NBA champion (2026); NBA All-Rookie Second Team (2023); Big 12 Sixth Man of the Year (2022); Big 12 All-Freshman Team (2022); FIBA U16 European Championship Division B MVP (2019)
- Stats at NBA.com
- Stats at Basketball Reference
Medals
Men's basketball
Representing Poland
FIBA U16 European Championship Division B
Gold medal – first place	2019 Podgorica	Team

Jeremy Juliusz Sochan (/ˈsoʊhæn/ SOH-han; born May 20, 2003) is a Polish-American professional basketball player for the Texas Legends of the NBA G League. Born in the United States to a Polish mother and an American father, he was raised in England and played youth basketball for the Solent Kestrels and Itchen College. Sochan moved to the United States to attend La Lumiere School, a power forward in the 2021 class, he then started his professional career in Germany with OrangeAcademy of the ProB in 2020. He played college basketball for the Baylor Bears during the 2021–22 season and was selected ninth overall by the San Antonio Spurs in the 2022 NBA draft. In 2026, Sochan won an NBA Championship with the Knicks. Sochan plays for the Poland national team after playing for Poland teams as a junior.

== Early life and career ==
Sochan was born in Guymon, Oklahoma. His mother, Aneta Sochan, was a Polish basketball player for Polonia Warsaw who played Division II college basketball at Panhandle State. While there, she met Sochan's father, Ryan Williams, who played for the men's basketball team. Williams died in a car accident in 2017. Sochan has a younger half-brother and stepfather.

Sochan's maternal grandfather, Juliusz Sochan, after whom he received his middle name, was a director of the basketball section of AZS AWF Warsaw and the president of the Warsaw Regional Basketball Association. His great-grandfather Zygmunt Sochan was an association football player for Warszawianka, making 94 appearances in the Ekstraklasa (Polish top division) before World War II, when he joined the Polish resistance against the Nazi German occupiers and was a Stutthof concentration camp survivor.

Sochan took his first steps in basketball while living in England, first as a youth for the MK Trojans in Milton Keynes before moving to Southampton and playing for the Solent Kestrels youth team and Itchen College.

Sochan began his high school career at La Lumiere School in Indiana, but due to the COVID-19 pandemic, he left the United States.

Sochan committed to playing college basketball for Baylor in July 2020.

== College career ==
On January 8, 2022, Sochan sprained his ankle during a game against TCU and missed several games. Following the season, he earned the Big 12 Sixth Man Award and was named to the Big 12 All-Freshman Team. His team later earned a #1 seed in the 2022 NCAA Division I men's basketball tournament, but lost in the second round. As a freshman, he averaged 9.2 points, 6.4 rebounds and 1.3 steals per game. On April 15, 2022, Sochan declared for the 2022 NBA draft, forgoing his remaining college eligibility.

== Professional career ==
=== OrangeAcademy (2020–2022) ===
In 2020, Sochan joined the German club OrangeAcademy of the ProB.

=== San Antonio Spurs (2022–2026) ===
Sochan was selected by the San Antonio Spurs with the ninth overall pick in the 2022 NBA draft. Sochan joined the Spurs' roster in the 2022 NBA Summer League, but later was ruled out after being placed in the NBA's Health and Safety Protocol after testing positive for coronavirus.

On July 8, 2022, Sochan signed a rookie-scale contract with the Spurs. On December 22, Sochan scored a then-career-high 23 points and grabbed nine rebounds in a 126–117 loss to the New Orleans Pelicans. For the 2023–24 NBA season, Sochan was named as the Spurs starting point guard, a position previously held by teammate Tre Jones. Dubbed as an "experiment", this decision to play him as a point forward for the first time was made due to Sochan displaying playmaking abilities the prior season. He resumed playing as power forward again after 17 games. On January 28, 2023, Sochan scored a then-career-high 30 points in a 128–118 loss to the Phoenix Suns. On November 30, 2023, he recorded a career high of 33 points in a 137–135 loss to the Atlanta Hawks.

Sochan has gained attention for his unorthodox technique of shooting free throws with one hand, an approach he began using in December 2022 after Spurs head coach Gregg Popovich suggested it as an experiment to increase Sochan's free throw percentage. The technique proved to increase his average free throw percentage by roughly 30% during the 2022–23 season. After an October 2023 game, Sochan said, "Yeah, I think I will be sticking with the one-hand free throw."

In November 2024, Sochan was scheduled to have surgery to repair a fractured left thumb. He was forced to exit early from the game versus the Los Angeles Clippers.

Under new head coach Mitch Johnson, Sochan fell out of the Spurs' rotation during the 2025–26 season which was largely attributed to development of rookie forward Carter Bryant. The Spurs kept Sochan through the trade deadline with the intention of moving him but could not arrange a deal. On February 11, 2026, it was announced that the Spurs and Sochan had reached a mutual agreement to waive him, allowing him to become a free agent ahead of the remainder of the 2025–26 NBA season. He averaged 4.1 points and 2.6 rebounds in 28 games during his final season with the Spurs.

=== New York Knicks (2026) ===
After clearing waivers, Sochan signed with the New York Knicks on February 13, 2026. On February 19, against the Detroit Pistons, Sochan made his Knicks debut. He played for ten minutes, logging in two points, one rebound, one assist, and a block. In Game 5 of the NBA Finals, Sochan helped the Knicks achieve a 94–90 win and was on the floor to close out the NBA Finals against his previous team, the San Antonio Spurs, 4–1, securing the Knicks' first NBA championship in 53 years.

On August 2, 2026, Sochan signed with the Portland Trail Blazers. He was waived on October 17 after appearing in four preseason games.

=== Texas Legends (2026–present) ===
On October 24, 2026, Sochan was selected with the first overall pick in the 2026 NBA G League Draft by the Texas Legends. He received offers to play in Europe and Australia but decided to join the NBA G League with the hope of making it back to the NBA.

== National team career ==
Sochan had represented Poland nationally at the junior level. As part of Poland's under-16 national basketball team, he led his team to the title at the 2019 FIBA U16 European Championship Division B in Montenegro. There, he became tournament MVP.

Sochan has been a member of the Polish national basketball team. In his first game at the EuroBasket 2022 qualification, he led Poland over Romania 88–81 when he became the youngest player to ever play for Poland. He played 29 minutes in which he scored 18 points, including a four-point play at the end and a game-deciding block.

== Personal life ==
On August 24, 2024, Sochan was involved in a car accident in San Antonio. He told police he lost control of his vehicle and hit a guardrail on the ramp connecting two highways. Sochan was uninjured in the crash. In 2026, his daughter was born.

== Career statistics ==
Legend
GP	Games played	GS	Games started	MPG	Minutes per game
FG%	Field goal percentage	3P%	3-point field goal percentage	FT%	Free throw percentage
RPG	Rebounds per game	APG	Assists per game	SPG	Steals per game
BPG	Blocks per game	PPG	Points per game	**Bold**	Career high

=== NBA ===
==== Regular season ====
Year	Team	GP	GS	MPG	FG%	3P%	FT%	RPG	APG	SPG	BPG	PPG
2022–23	San Antonio	56	53	26.0	.453	.246	.698	5.3	2.5	**.8**	.4	11.0
2023–24	San Antonio	**74**	**73**	**29.6**	.438	**.308**	.771	6.4	**3.4**	**.8**	**.5**	**11.6**
2024–25	San Antonio	54	23	25.3	.535	**.308**	.696	**6.5**	2.4	**.8**	**.5**	11.4
2025–26^{†}	San Antonio	28	0	12.8	.475	.257	.688	2.6	1.0	.4	.2	4.1
2025–26^{†}	New York	16	0	6.9	**.567**	.200	**.800**	2.1	.8	.4	.1	2.8
Career		228	149	24.1	.470	.286	.725	5.4	2.5	.7	.4	9.9

==== Playoffs ====
Year	Team	GP	GS	MPG	FG%	3P%	FT%	RPG	APG	SPG	BPG	PPG
2026†	New York	8	0	3.3	.778	.500	.625	.6	.3	.1	.1	2.5
Career		8	0	3.3	.778	.500	.625	.6	.3	.1	.1	2.5

=== College ===
Year	Team	GP	GS	MPG	FG%	3P%	FT%	RPG	APG	SPG	BPG	PPG
2021–22	Baylor	30	1	25.1	.474	.296	.589	6.4	1.8	1.3	.7	9.2
