= Tomasovia Tomaszów Lubelski =

Polish football club

- Full name: Tomaszowski Klub Sportowy Tomasovia
- Founded: 1923; 102 years ago (as Thomasovia)
- Ground: Stadion Miejski
- Capacity: 2,050
- Chairman: Tomasz Walentyn
- Manager: Paweł Babiarz
- League: IV liga Lublin
- 2024–25: IV liga Lublin, 3rd of 17
- Website: https://tomasovia.tomaszow.info
Home colours	Away colours

Tomasovia Tomaszów Lubelski is a Polish football club based in Tomaszów Lubelski. Following relegation from III liga, group IV in 2022, they compete in the IV liga Lublin, the fifth tier of the Polish football league.

== History ==
Tomasovia Tomaszów Lubelski was formed in 1923 as Thomosovia. Shortly before World War II the club changed its name to Tomasovia. In the 1975–76 season, the club gained promotion to the reformed third tier of the Polish football league for the first time in its history. They went on to spend seven seasons at this level, achieving a club record highest league finish of tenth place in the 1997–98 season. Despite finishing in 10th place, Tomasovia were relegated to the fourth tier due to league restructuring.

== Stadium ==
The club play their home matches at Stadion Miejski w Tomaszowie Lubelskim, which has a capacity of 2,050.
