= Turkowice, Lublin Voivodeship =

Turkowice
- Village
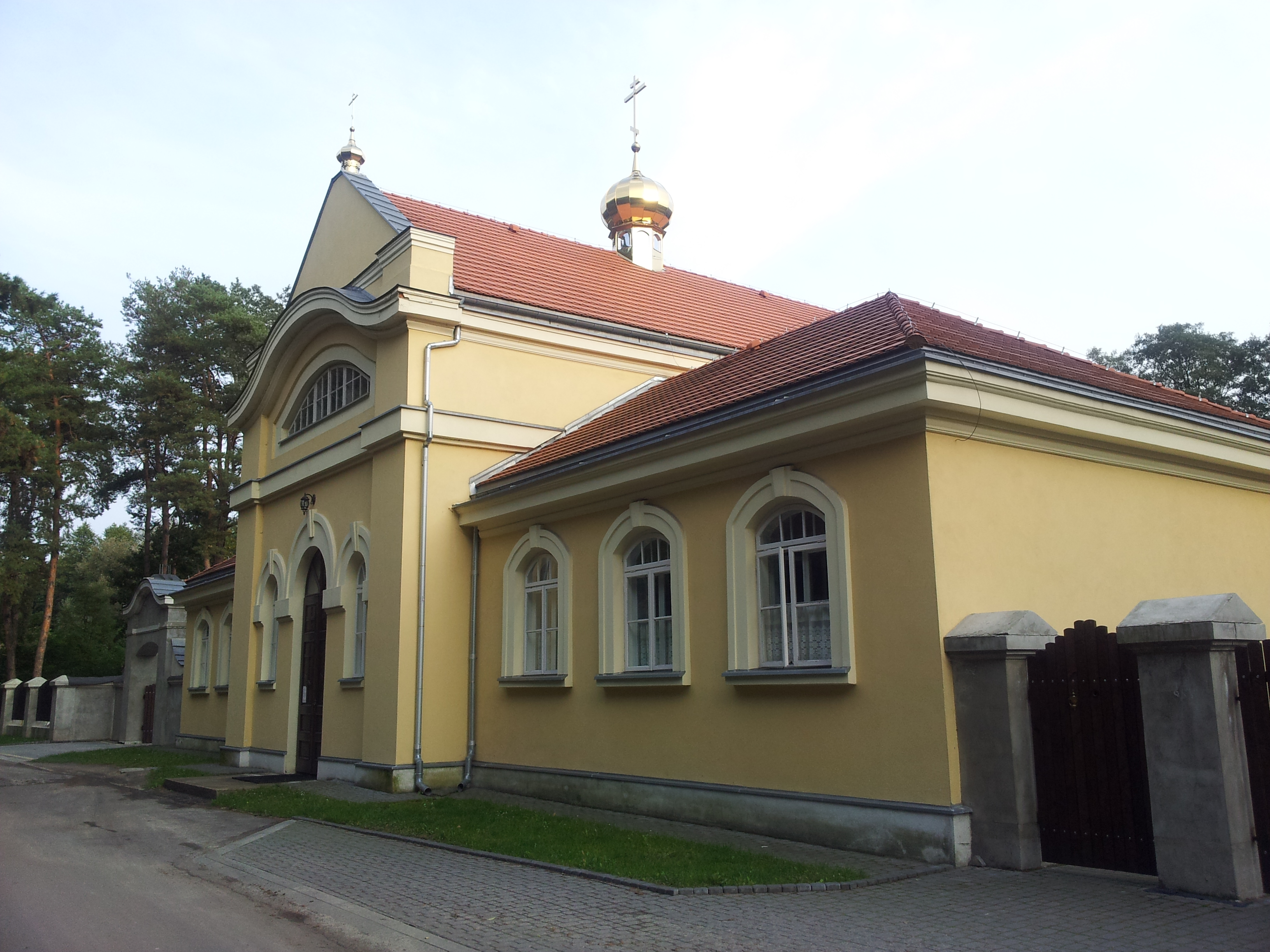
- Monastery of Holy Mother of God

- Location within Poland
- Coordinates: 50°40′N 23°44′E
- Country: Poland
- Voivodeship: Lublin
- County: Hrubieszów
- Gmina: Werbkowice

Turkowice [turkɔˈvit͡sɛ] is a village in the administrative district of Gmina Werbkowice, within Hrubieszów County, Lublin Voivodeship, in eastern Poland.

== History ==
=== World War II ===
During the World War II, in March 1944, Turkowice was attacked by Polish partisans in reprisal for the Massacres of Poles in Volhynia carried out by Ukrainian nationalists. Eighty Ukrainian villagers were murdered and 150 houses destroyed.
