= Tomaszów Lubelski =

Town in Lublin Voivodeship, Poland

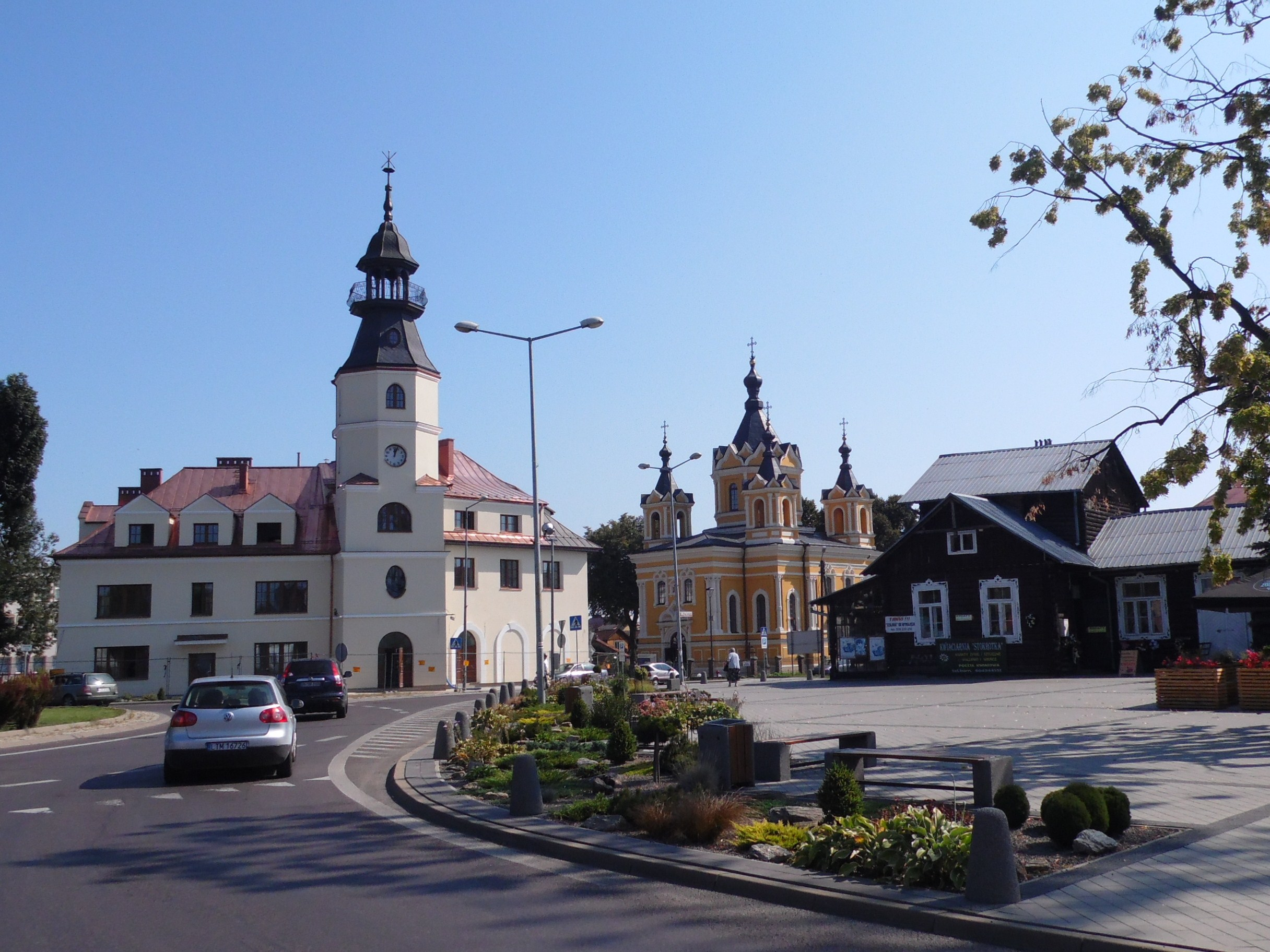
- Rynek (Market Square)

- Coat of arms
- Interactive map of Tomaszów Lubelski
- Location within Poland
- Coordinates: 50°27′N 23°25′E
- Country: Poland
- Voivodeship: Lublin
- County: Tomaszów
- Gmina: Tomaszów Lubelski (urban gmina)
- Established: 16th century
- Town rights: 1621
- Founder: Jan Zamoyski
- Named for: Tomasz Zamoyski

Government
  - Mayor: Wojciech Żukowski (PiS)

Area
  - Total: 13.29 km^{2} (5.13 sq mi)
- Elevation: 280 m (920 ft)

Population (2013)
  - Total: 19,365
  - Density: 1,457/km^{2} (3,774/sq mi)
- Time zone: UTC+1 (CET)
  - Summer (DST): UTC+2 (CEST)
- Postal code: 22-600
- Car plates: LTM
- Website: www.tomaszow-lubelski.pl

Tomaszów Lubelski [tɔˈmaʂuf luˈbɛlskʲi] is a town in south-eastern Poland with 19,365 inhabitants (2017). Situated in the Lublin Voivodeship, near Roztocze National Park, it is the capital of Tomaszów County.

== History ==
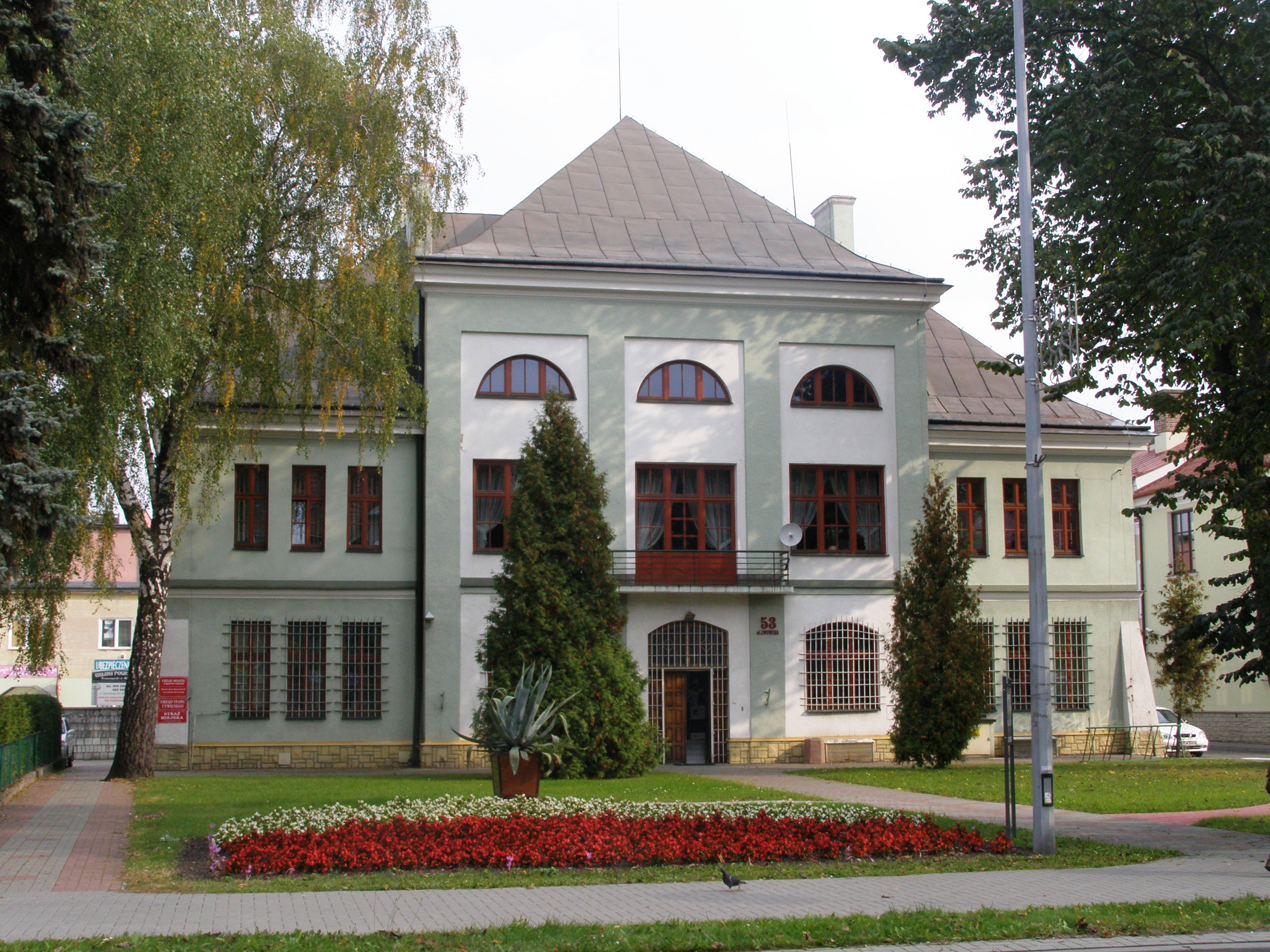
Historic County Sejmik

The town was founded at the end of the 16th century by Jan Zamoyski as Jelitowo. It has been known by its current name since 1613, when it was renamed after Zamoyski's son, Tomasz. It obtained its city charter in 1621. It was administratively located in the Bełz Voivodeship in the Lesser Poland Province of Poland. The area around the city saw serious fighting in 1914 during World War I.

On 17–26 September 1939, during the joint German-Soviet invasion of Poland which started World War II, the Battle of Tomaszów Lubelski was fought between Poland and Germany. The town was bombed by the Germans and eventually found itself under German occupation. The town's Jewish community, which numbered over 5,600 in 1939 at the start of the war, was persecuted by the occupiers in the Holocaust. The Nazi Germans first placed the Jews in a ghetto established in the town, then exterminated them in 1942 at the Bełżec extermination camp located a few km. south of the town. The Jewish community ceased to exist.

In 1975–1998, the town was administratively located in the Zamość Voivodeship.

There is an Orthodox Church of St. Nicholas in the town, built in the Russian Revival style, constructed between 1885 and 1890 using state funds allocated by the Russian government for such purposes. The church remained continuously open during World War I, the interwar period, and World War II. Pastoral activities were interrupted only by Operation Vistula and the forced resettlement of Orthodox Ukrainians from Tomaszów. Until 1957, the abandoned church was used by dairy plants and gradually fell into disrepair. That year, the Orthodox parish in Tomaszów Lubelski was reinstated, and a provisional renovation of the building was carried out. More extensive restoration work took place in the late 1980s and early 21st century.

== Education ==
In the town there are two faculties of the Catholic University of Lublin (Legal and Economic Sciences). It has two high schools (Bartosz Głowacki High School and Władysław Sikorski High School), three technical colleges, two gymnasiums and two primary schools.

== Culture ==
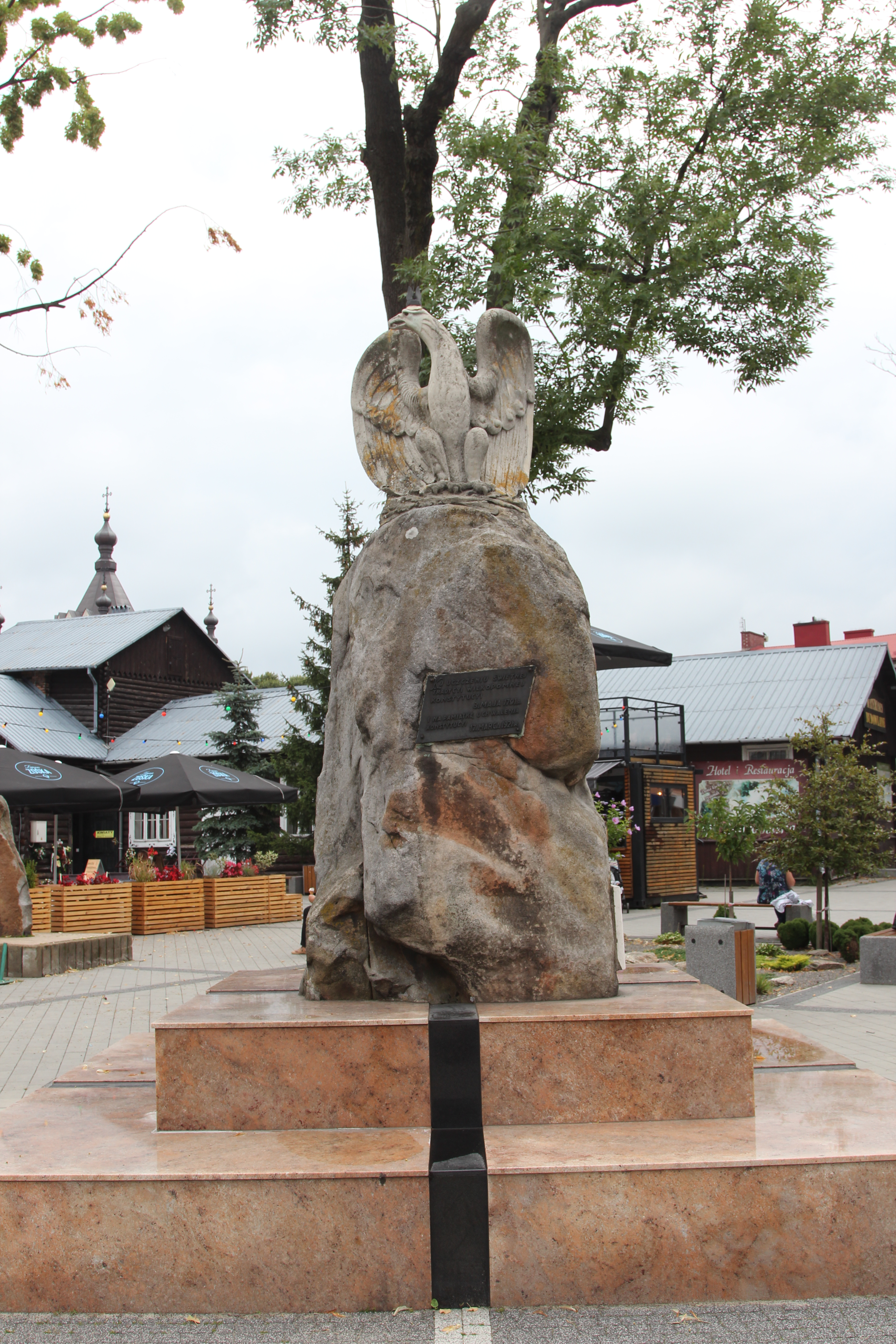
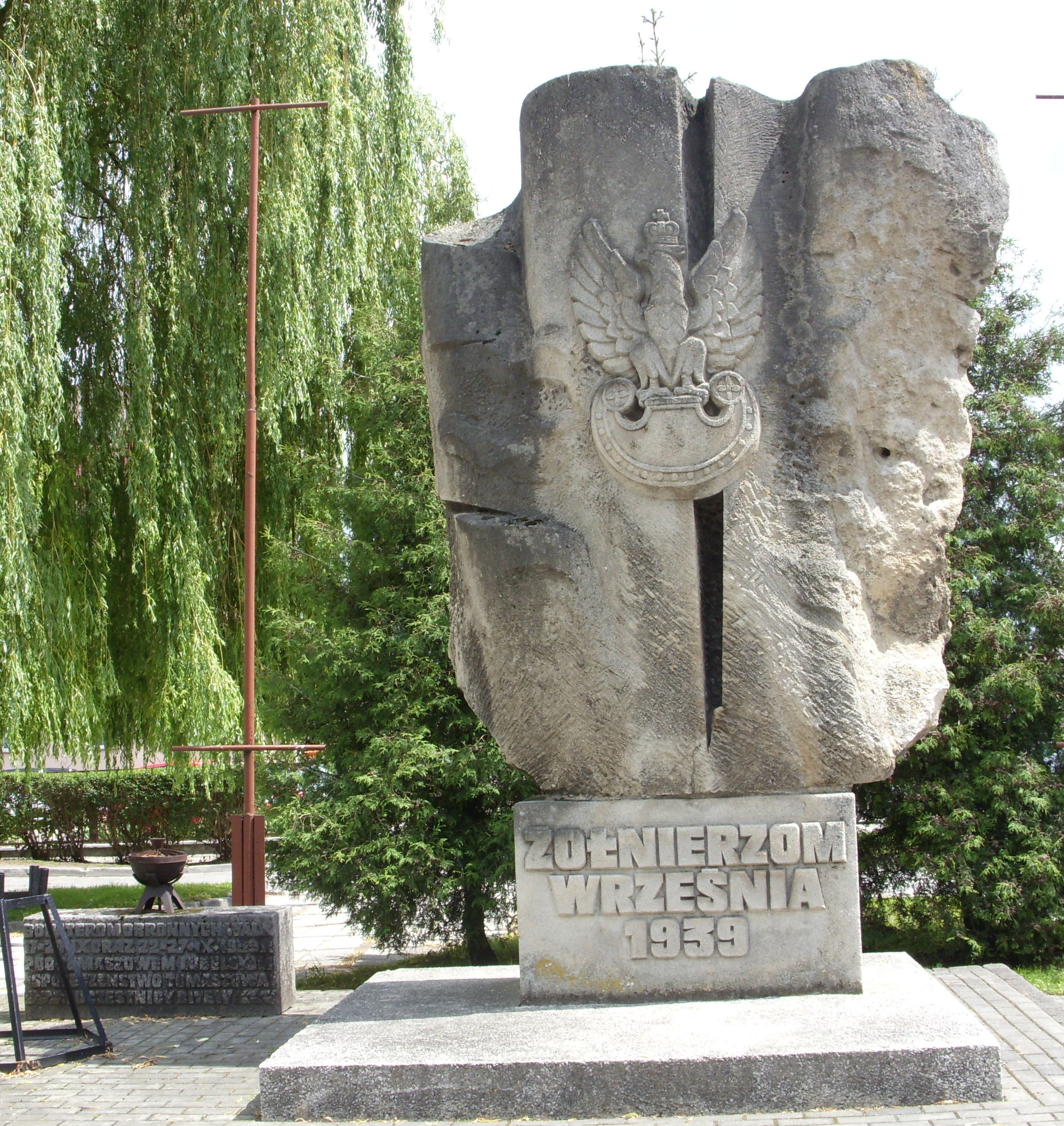
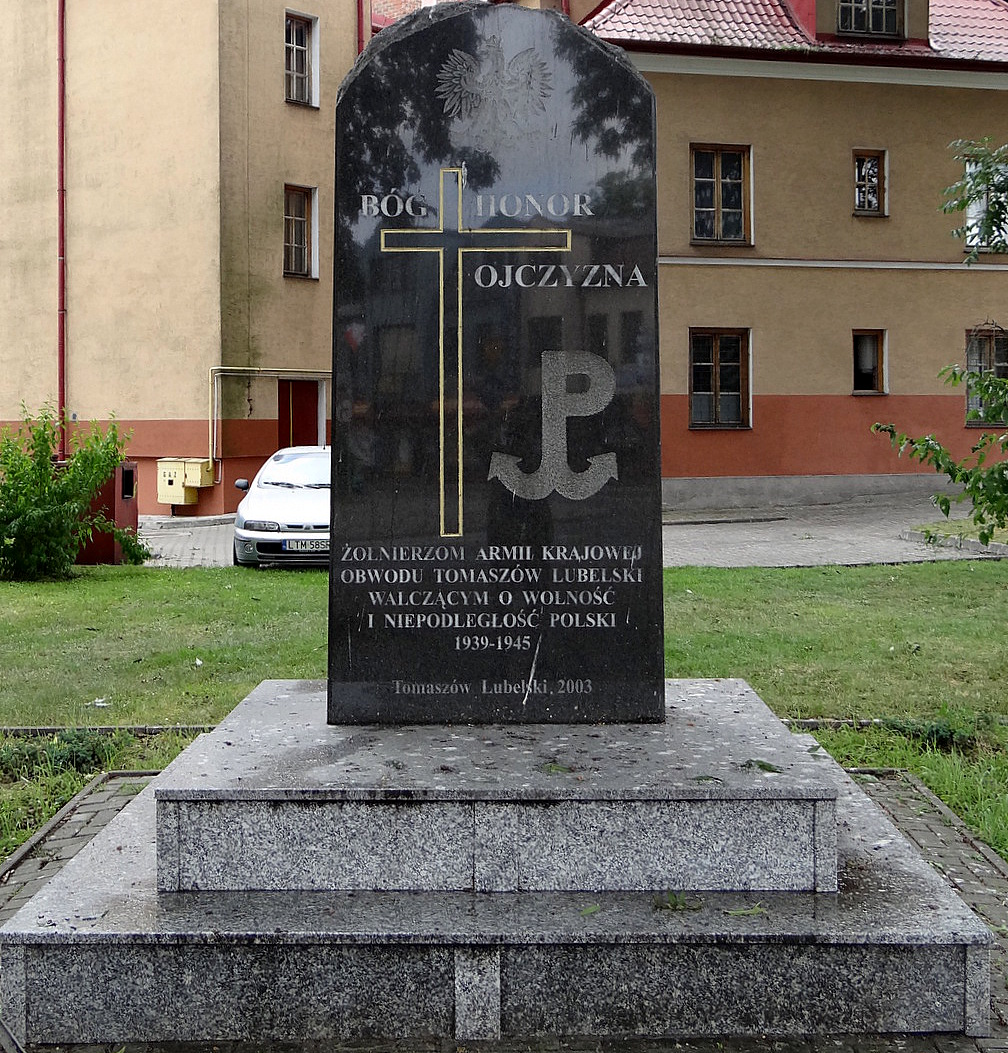
Monuments commemorating the Constitution of 3 May 1791, Polish soldiers of September 1939 and local partisans of the Home Army from WW2

International Folk Festival Roztocze is a popular annual music festival organized since 1990. Since 2008 the town council organizes reconstructions of the Battle of Tomaszów.

== Sports ==
Tomaszów is the home for the football team Tomasovia.

== Media ==
There are two main newspapers published weekly in Tomaszów Lubelski. The first of them, ReWizje Tomaszowskie, is financed by the town council. The second of them, Tygodnik Tomaszowski, belongs to a private company.

== Twin towns ==
Tomaszów Lubelski is twinned with:

- Grigiškės, Lithuania
- Kivertsi, Ukraine
- Zhovkva, Ukraine

== Notable people ==
- Mordechai Yosef Leiner (1801–1854), Hasidic thinker
- Menachem Mendel of Kotzk, (1787–1859), Hasidic thinker
- Joanna Pacuła (born 1957), actress
- Leon Pinsker (1821–1891), Zionist activist
- Zygmunt Sochan (1909–1998), footballer and member of the Polish resistance movement in World War II
- Monika Skinder (born 2001), cross-country skier
- Moshe Wertman (1924–2011), Israeli politician
- Marek Zub (born 1964), football manager
- Wojciech Żukowski (born 1964), member of the parliament, Law and Justice

== Notes ==
- Catholic University of Lublin Official website
