= Monastery of Holy Mother of God, Turkowice =

Female Orthodox monastery in Turkowice, Poland

Monastery of Holy Mother of God
- Monaster Opieki Matki Bożej
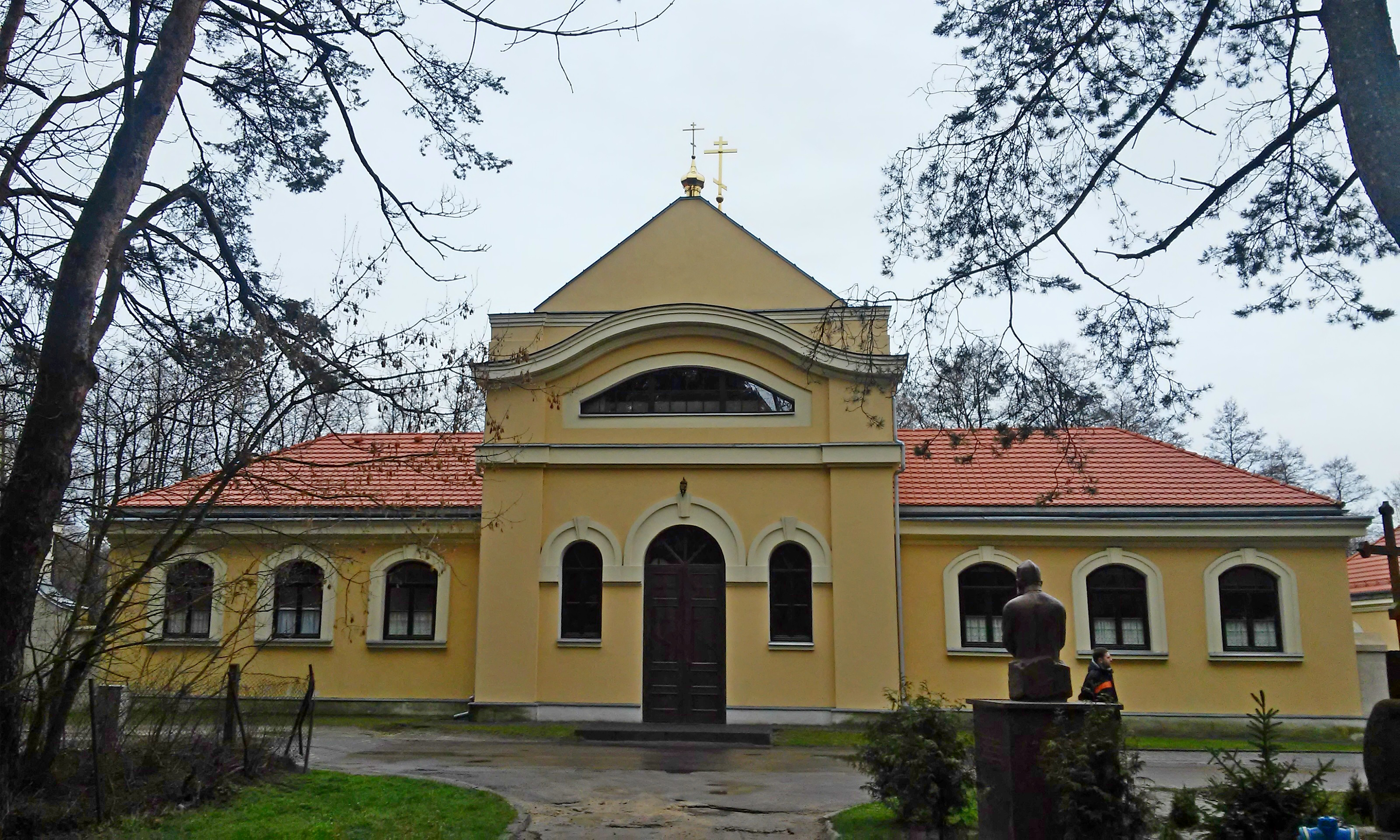
- View of the monastery building

- Location within Poland
- Interactive map of Monastery of Holy Mother of God

Monastery information
- Order: Polish Orthodox Church
- Diocese: Diocese of Lublin and Chełm
- Controlled churches: Church of the Holy Mother of God; Church of Paraskeva of the Balkans

People
- Founders: nuns from Anthony of Kiev Monastery in Radecznica; Abel Popławski – reactivation
- House superior: Elżbieta Krawczuk

Architecture
- Status: enclosed religious order
- Style: Russian Revival
- Completion date: 1903
- Closed: 1915 (reopened unofficially in 1936, and officially in 2008)

Site
- Location: Turkowice
- Country: Poland
- Coordinates: 50°40′09″N 23°44′21″E

The Monastery of Holy Mother of God is a female Orthodox monastery in Turkowice, part of the Diocese of Lublin and Chełm of the Polish Orthodox Church.

The monastery was established in 1903 as one of the non-contemplative monasteries founded in the western dioceses of the Russian Orthodox Church with the support of Tsar Nicholas II and his wife, Alexandra Feodorovna. Turkowice was chosen as the site for the monastery due to the local Ukrainian population's veneration of the Turkowice Icon of the Mother of God. The nuns primarily engaged in social work: they ran schools, a hospital, a pharmacy, and an orphanage. The monastery was also intended to strengthen Orthodox and Russian cultural influence in the territories incorporated into the Russian Empire following the partitions of Poland. It was an important pilgrimage destination. The monastery functioned until the nuns left for refuge during World War I, from which most did not return.

In the interwar period, the Polish Orthodox Church unsuccessfully attempted to restore the monastery. A few nuns who returned from Russia first lived in the village and then in nearby Sahryń. Meanwhile, the monastery buildings housed charitable institutions run by the Sisters Servants, and after their dissolution during the Polish People's Republic, a farming school operated there. The monastic cathedral was demolished in the 1920s, and the second monastery church was adapted for secular purposes.

The purchase of the former pilgrim house by the Orthodox Diocese of Lublin and Chełm enabled the monastery's reactivation, which was carried out in 2008 by a decree from Archbishop Abel. Since 2013, the remaining former monastic buildings have been unused. The monastery is a center of worship for the Turkowice Icon of the Mother of God and the Sister Paraskeva, who lived there from 1912 to 1915.

Since 2019, the Turkowice Monastery oversees the skete of St. Nicholas in Holeszów.

== History ==
=== Origins of monastic life in Turkowice ===
The exact date of the establishment of the first monastic community in what is now the village of Turkowice is unknown. According to legend, when Duke Vladislaus II was transporting the icon of Black Madonna of Częstochowa from Belz to Jasna Góra Monastery, he stopped near Turkowice to rest. When he tried to leave, the horses were unable to pull the wagon carrying the miraculous icon. Only after doubling their efforts was the procession able to leave the resting place. At the spot where the wagon stood, a light appeared, in which the face of Mary was clearly visible. The image miraculously transferred itself onto a canvas, creating the revered Turkowice Icon of the Mother of God.

The local Orthodox population built a church on this site. According to Orthodox authors, a male monastery developed around the building. The date of its establishment is undetermined. According to this version of events, after the Union of Brest was signed in 1596, the monks accepted its terms and joined the Basilian Order. However, this did not happen immediately after the union, but rather in the second half of the 17th century at the earliest. In 1749, the monastery was closed on the orders of the Uniate bishop. Historian Andrzej Gil, however, argues that there is no evidence of a medieval origin for the veneration of the Turkowice Icon of the Mother of God, nor for the existence of an Orthodox monastic community in the village. In his view, the Basilian monastery, established in the first half of the 18th century and operating for several decades, was the first monastery in Turkowice. During this period, a Uniate parish was also created in the village. According to Father Krzysztof Grzesiak, the legend of the Turkowice Icon of the Mother of God emerged in the early 20th century to justify the establishment of an Orthodox monastery funded by the Russian authorities.

=== Establishment and activities of the female monastery ===
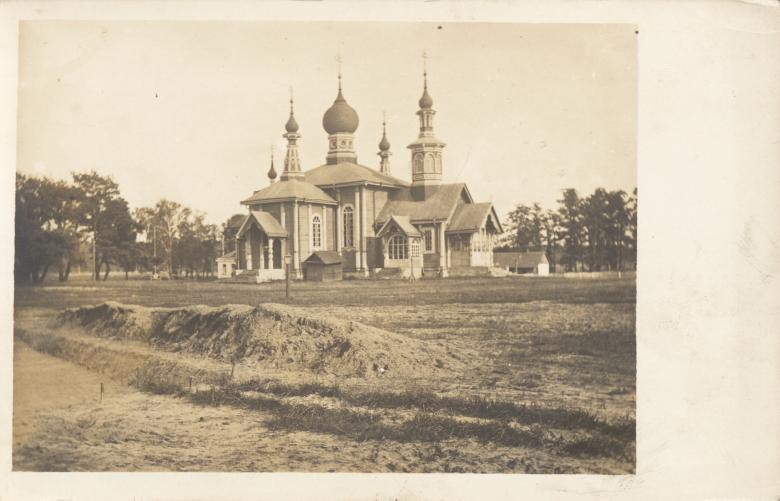
Monastery in Turkowice in 1916

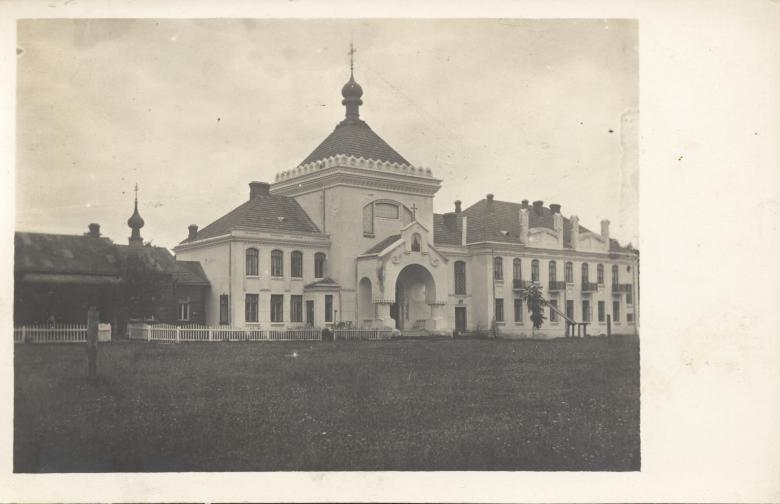
View of one of the monastic buildings with the Church of St. Euphrosyne of Polotsk

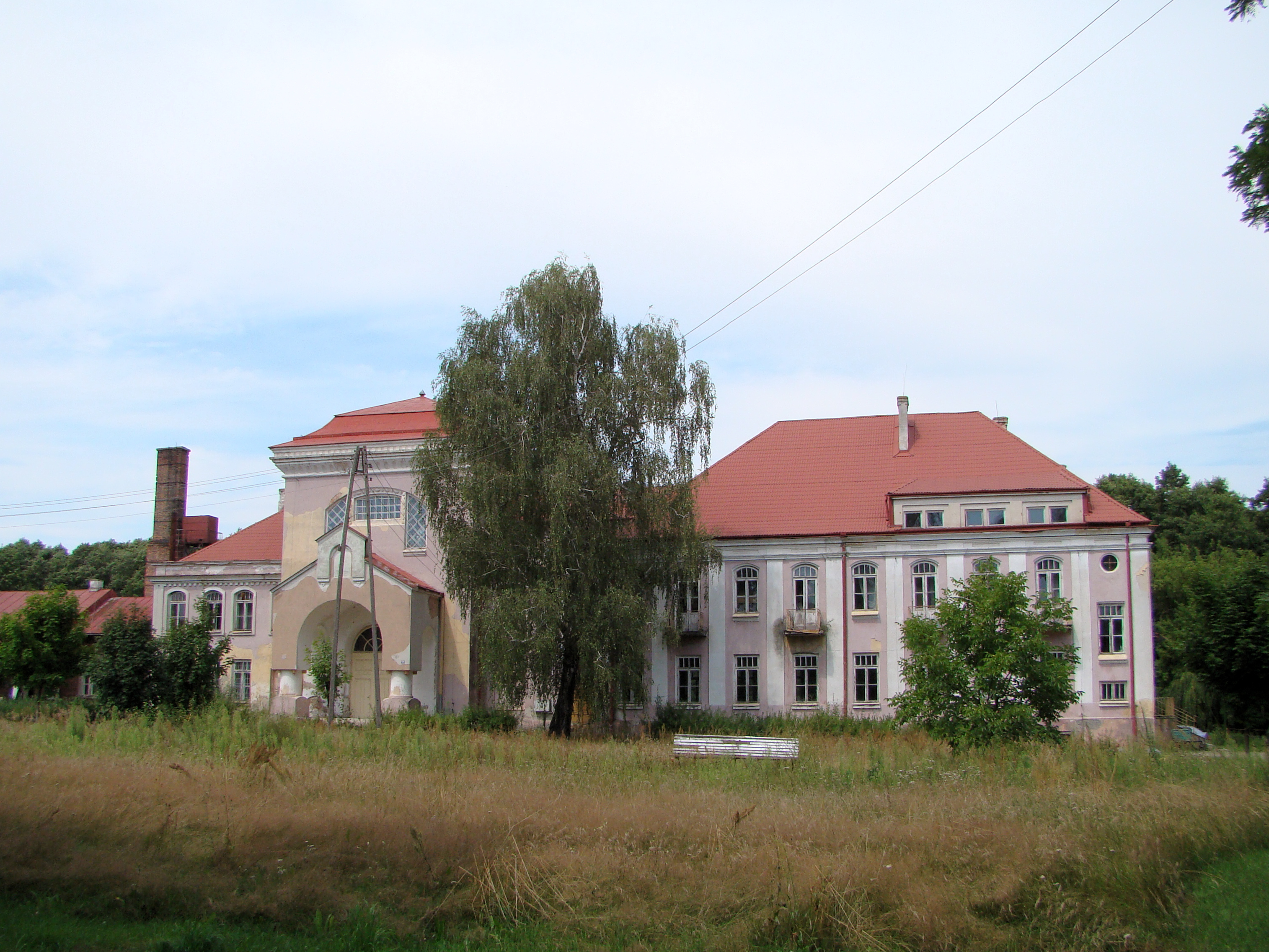
The same building after renovation, view from 2013

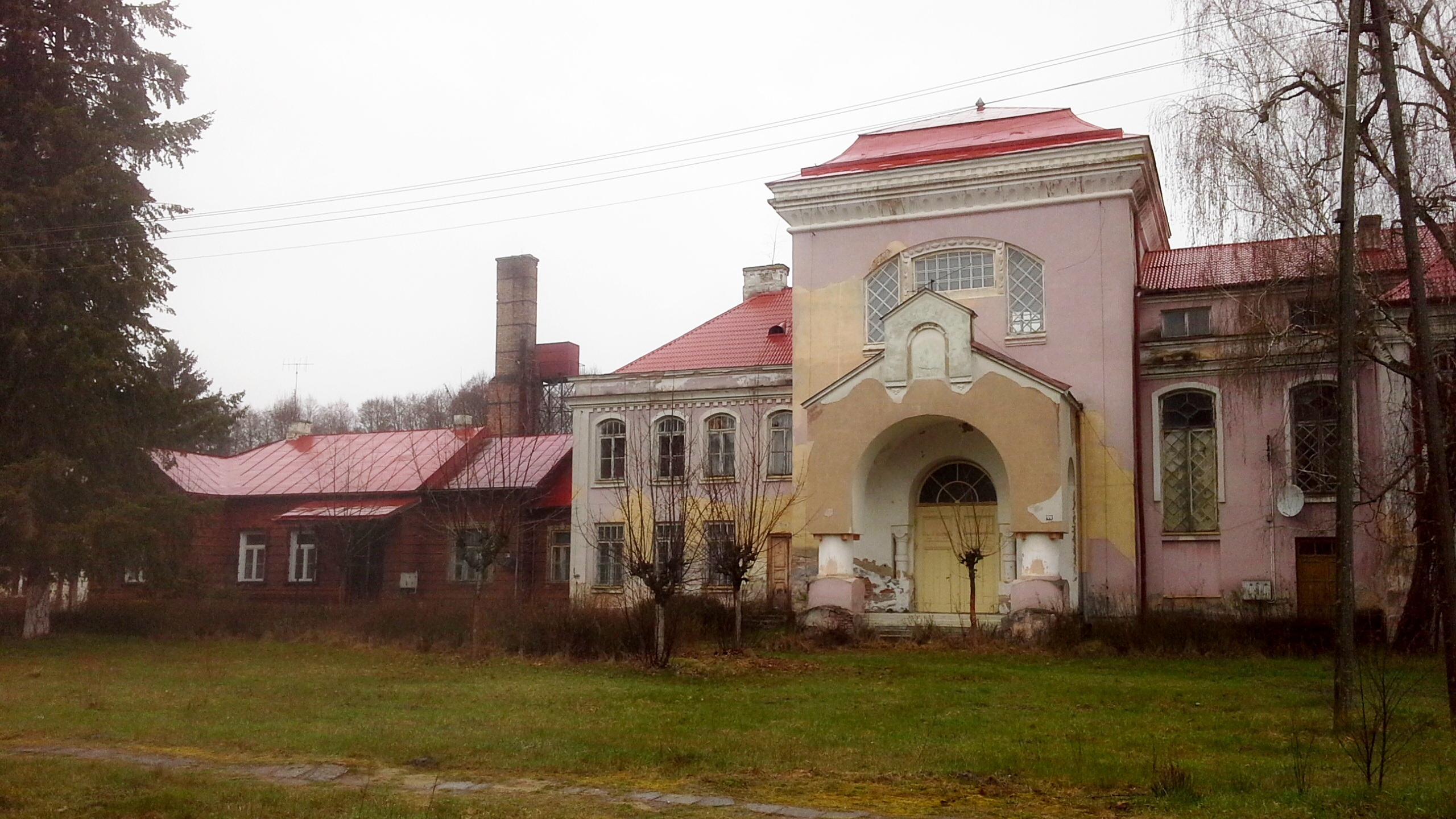
Former church and the hegumenia's house (on the left)

In the second half of the 19th century, the Russian Orthodox Church experienced a significant increase in the number of monasteries and the monks and nuns inhabiting them. Additionally, a new type of monastery emerged, previously unknown in the Russian church tradition – non-contemplative monasteries focused on social work. These monasteries were mainly established in the western dioceses of the church, i.e., in territories annexed to Russia during the three partitions of Poland. These types of monasteries received substantial financial support from the imperial family and wealthy private donors. The benefactors wished for monks and nuns to contribute to the expansion of Orthodox influence, language, and Russian culture in these areas. The first non-contemplative monastery in the Diocese of Chełm and Warsaw was the female Monastery of the Nativity of the Mother of God in Leśna Podlaska, established in 1889 and led by Hegumenia Catherine Yefimovskaya, co-creator of the new concept of a socially engaged monastery. Nuns from this monastery subsequently contributed to the establishment of several other monastic communities in this diocese with similar rules: the Monastery of Christ the Savior in Wirów, the Monastery of the Transfiguration in Teolin, and the Monastery of St. Anthony in Radecznica. Urszula Pawluczuk states that the main protector of such monasteries was Empress Alexandra Feodorovna, who became a fervent advocate of her new faith after converting to Orthodoxy from Lutheranism.

In 1903, a branch of the Monastery of St. Anthony in Radecznica was founded in Turkowice. Its superior was Sister Magdalena (Gorczakowa), who organized the new community according to the model known to her from Leśna Podlaska. The nuns operated a pharmacy, hospital, beekeeping, farming school and orphanage, and from 1910 also a teacher training seminary. The monastery's leadership positions were held by Russians, but it is not possible to determine the overall number of them in the entire community. The monastery complex was built from scratch. At the time of the nuns' arrival, only a wooden church was operating on the site. For the monastery, a five-domed cathedral and a complex of six residential and utility buildings (five wooden, one brick with the Church of St. Sergius and Herman of Valaam) (according to another source – St. Euphrosyne of Polotsk) were built. The main church in the building complex was wooden. The largest of its onion-shaped domes was situated above the nave of the structure, while the remaining lower and longer ones were located on steep tent roofs above the vestibule, chancel, and side chapels. The construction project was co-financed by the Most Holy Synod. Inside the main church was a three-row gilded iconostasis made in the workshop of the Monastery of St. Anthony in Radecznica. The remaining icons complementing the church's furnishings also came from there. The monastic community had its own cemetery. All buildings were maintained in the Russian Revival style.

The monastery was an important pilgrimage site. Thousands of pilgrims visited the village on the feast days of the Protection of the Mother of God and the Deposition of the Robe of the Mother of God. An anonymous account of the celebrations, written by a person using the pseudonym Czerwonorusin, has survived:

We enter the forest and see thousands of carriages, and on the square not thousands but tens of thousands of people. You see the Red Russians. You hear the beautiful Little Russian speech not of one or two encountered people, but tens of thousands of Little Russian people. In this multi-thousand crowd, you see both old and young, youth, townspeople, peasants, and many intellectuals. This shimmering crowd gathered from the Tomaszów, Chełm, Zamość, Krasnystaw, and even Biłgoraj counties, as well as neighboring Volhynia, to bow before the miraculous image.

In 1906, Bishop Eulogius led the ceremony of transferring the Turkowice Icon of the Mother of God to the monastery cathedral and adorned it with a riza set with precious stones. Fifteen thousand faithful gathered for this ceremony. The monastery helped to maintain Orthodoxy among the local former Uniates after the issuance of the act of tolerance allowing them to convert to Latin Rite Catholicism.

In 1910, also with the support of Bishop Eulogius, the monastery became independent, and in 1912 it attained the status of a first-class monastery. On the eve of World War I, the community consisted of 80 nuns, and up to 30,000 pilgrims would come to the monastery's feast days. In 1915, the nuns from Turkowice left for Russia along with the miraculous icon housed in the monastery. They temporarily stayed at the Marfo-Mariinsky Convent in Moscow.

One of the novices in the Turkowice monastery before 1915 was Paraskeva, who was canonized in 2000 by the Russian Orthodox Church as a holy nun confessor.

During World War I, a German infectious disease hospital was established in the monastery. Only four nuns from the original community decided to return to Turkowice after the end of hostilities. They were accompanied by Father Andrzej Bojczuk. However, the abandoned monastery buildings were taken over by the Polish state and handed over to the Catholic congregation of the Servant Sisters, who organized an orphanage, school, and nursing home in them. As a result, the attempt to reactivate the Orthodox monastery undertaken in 1919 by the nuns who returned from exile was unsuccessful. The nuns first lived in a private house in the village, then moved to Sahryń, where a local host, Kowalczuk, invited them to stay in his house. The Polish police accused them of anti-Polish activities, and the local authorities were also concerned that Father Bojczuk was conducting pastoral activities without their permission. Ultimately, this part of the former community was also dispersed – the nuns moved to various monasteries of the Polish Orthodox Church.

=== Interwar period ===
==== Catholic monastery ====
In 1919, by order of the Polish authorities, the buildings of the former Orthodox monastery were occupied by an institution of the Main Committee for Aid to Repatriates. The committee established an orphanage for war orphans managed by the Catholic congregation of the Servant Sisters of the Blessed Virgin Mary. From 1921, the monastery was headed by Sister Stanisława Polechajło. In 1924, Father Marian Dębski became the chaplain of the monastery and simultaneously led the Society for the Development of Eastern Lands, coordinating actions related to the reclamation of Orthodox churches and the planned Polonization of the region. The monastery and its associated school, where Polish and Ukrainian children studied together, was described as an important center of Polish culture. The external appearance of the complex was changed. The former cathedral, neglected after the nuns left for exile, deteriorated and was ultimately completely demolished. The cemetery of the Turkowice nuns was also destroyed.

==== Attempts to revive the monastery before World War II ====
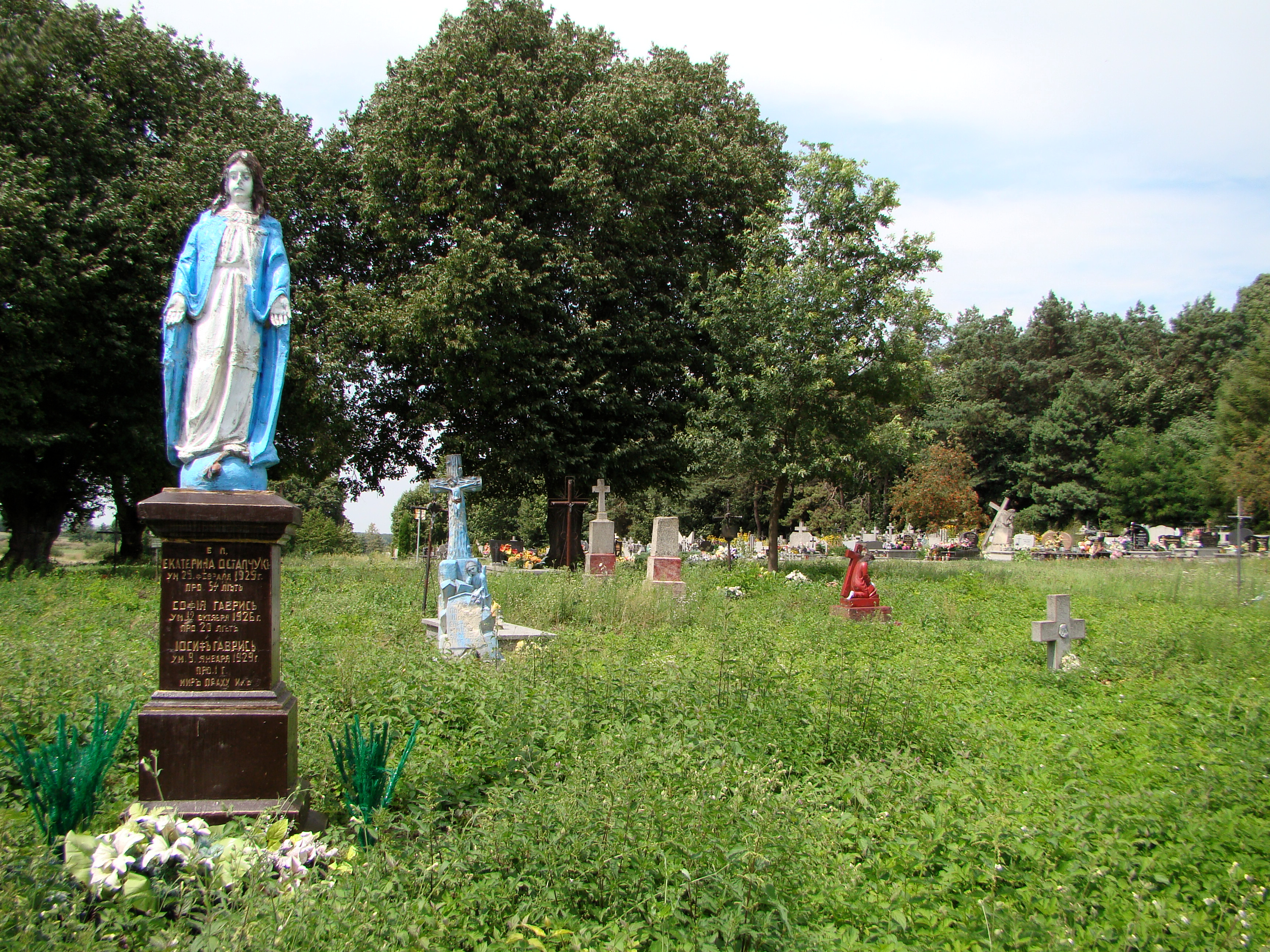
Orthodox (older) part of the cemetery in Turkowice. Here stood the chapel, which from 1924 to 1938 was the center of the cult of the Turkowice Icon of the Mother of God.

According to Grzegorz Pelica, the cult of the Turkowice Icon of the Mother of God began to spontaneously revive after 1927; other sources indicate that the first liturgical celebrations in its honor after World War I were organized as early as three years earlier. The persistence of the cult prompted the Synod of Bishops of the Polish Orthodox Church to support it through the activities of specially delegated non-staff clergy to Turkowice: monks Arsenius (Baziaruk), Athanasius (Bokijewicz), Athanasius (Martos), Joseph (Zabarny), Barlaam (Epifanov), and Seraphim (Samojlik). Archbishop Aleksy of Lutsk was also involved in the development of the cult. By the late 1930s, Turkowice had again become a pilgrimage destination. The popularity of the cult of the Turkowice Icon of the Mother of God is reflected in folk songs, in which the village was mentioned as a major sacred place in the Chełm region, comparable to the monastery in Jabłeczna and the Pochaiv Lavra (a song about Turkowice was written by Father Dmytro Pawełko). In 1928, 12,000 faithful attended the icon's feast day organized at the Orthodox cemetery in Turkowice. A year later, the former monastery cathedral was demolished, officially due to poor technical condition and lack of utility "for state needs".

On 25 September 1931, Metropolitan Dionysius Waledyński of Warsaw and all Poland permanently assigned monk Athanasius (Martos) to the village as the parson of the non-staff parish, with the task of reorganizing the female monastery. Around 1933, monk Athanasius (Martos) made the first attempts to create it, without the consent of the Polish authorities. Hegumenia Magdalena (Trojczuk) arrived in Turkowice, and Sister Animansa from the Zymne Monastery was also supposed to be involved in creating the new community. Unable to reclaim the buildings the nuns had before 1915, the Synod of Bishops of the Polish Orthodox Church made efforts to purchase other properties in the village. They contacted the owners of the local manor, the Makomaski family, negotiating the purchase of two morgen of land, allegedly to expand the Orthodox cemetery. When the Makomaskis learned that the Orthodox intended to build a residential building for nuns on this land, they broke off the transaction and donated the land to the Catholic Church. The monastery was supposed to be subordinated to the Monastery of St. Onuphrius in Jabłeczna. In 1932, about 30,000 Orthodox faithful attended another celebration in honor of the Turkowice Icon of the Mother of God in the village. By 1936, Bishop Sawa of Lublin had gathered several nuns in Turkowice, but the formal reestablishment of the monastery never occurred. Moreover, on Roman Catholic Easter in 1938 or 1939, the local Orthodox population was forced to confess and take the Eucharist in the church (most of the villagers almost immediately returned to Orthodoxy), and in July 1938, the Orthodox chapel at the cemetery in Turkowice was destroyed.

=== World War II ===
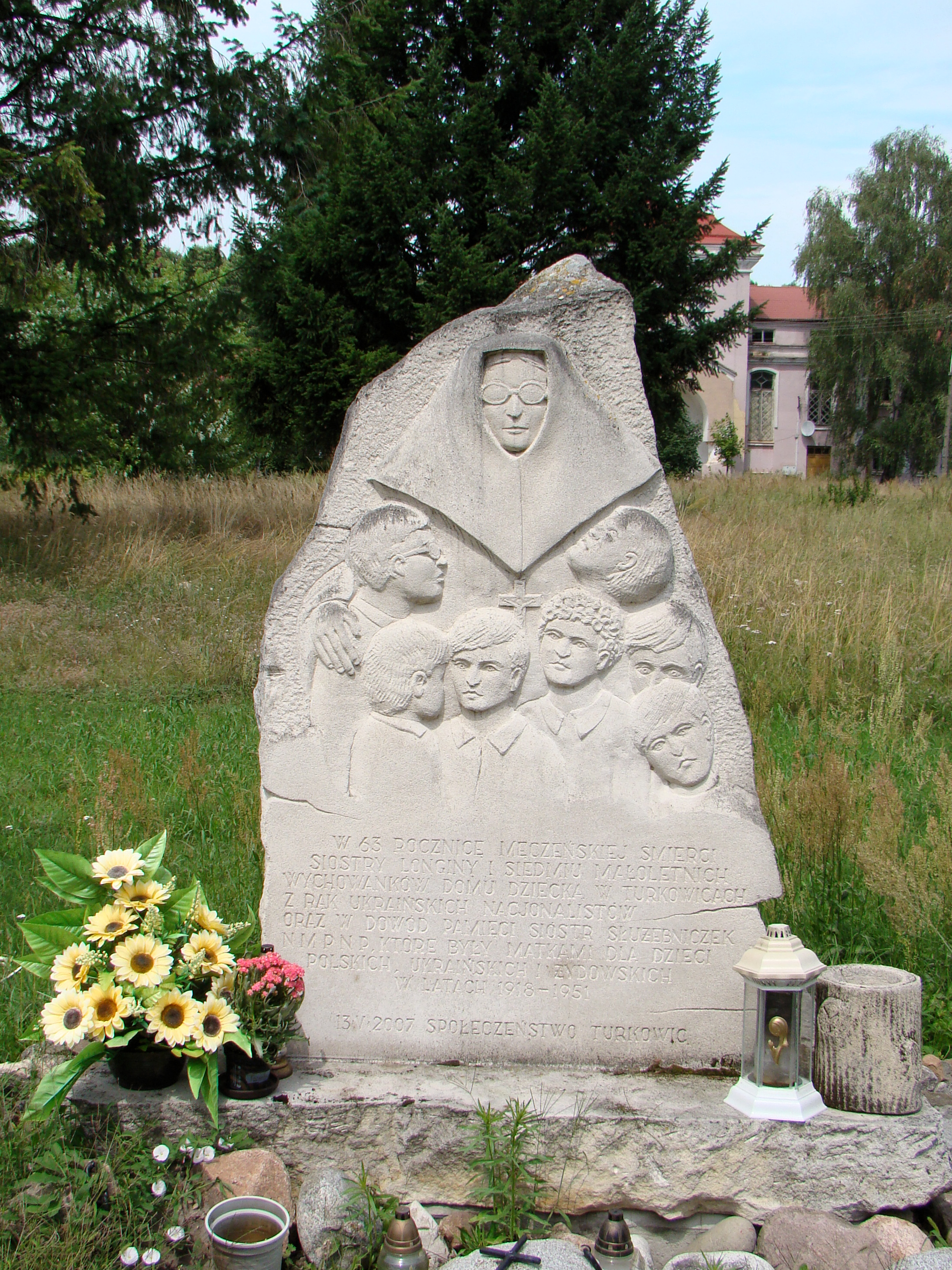
Monument of Sister Longina from the orphanage run by the Sisters Servants of the Blessed Virgin Mary and their wards, victims of Ukrainian nationalists

During World War II, Orthodox nuns were granted permission to reside in one of the monastery buildings (previously occupied by the school), while the rest of the complex continued to be administered by Catholic nuns. One of the monastery's churches was returned to the Orthodox by the German occupation authorities. Amid the Polish-Ukrainian partisan conflicts in the Chełm region, on 10 March 1944, Polish partisans burned the village of Turkowice as part of a larger offensive. Some residents fled to the orphanage, which was regarded as a neutral zone by both Polish partisan units and the Ukrainian Insurgent Army. During the war, the Catholic nuns sheltered about 300 children in the orphanage, including Jewish children. The Orphanage for War Orphans, run by the Sisters Servants of the Blessed Virgin Mary, operated in the former monastery until 1951. Subsequently, the monastery buildings housed an agricultural school and dormitory, as well as the first training center for tractor drivers in Poland.

The Orthodox nuns ultimately left the monastery during the deportations of the Ukrainian Orthodox population from the Chełm region (Operation Vistula and deportations to the Soviet Union). During this time, the cult of the Turkowice Icon of the Mother of God also ceased.

=== Reactivation of the monastery ===
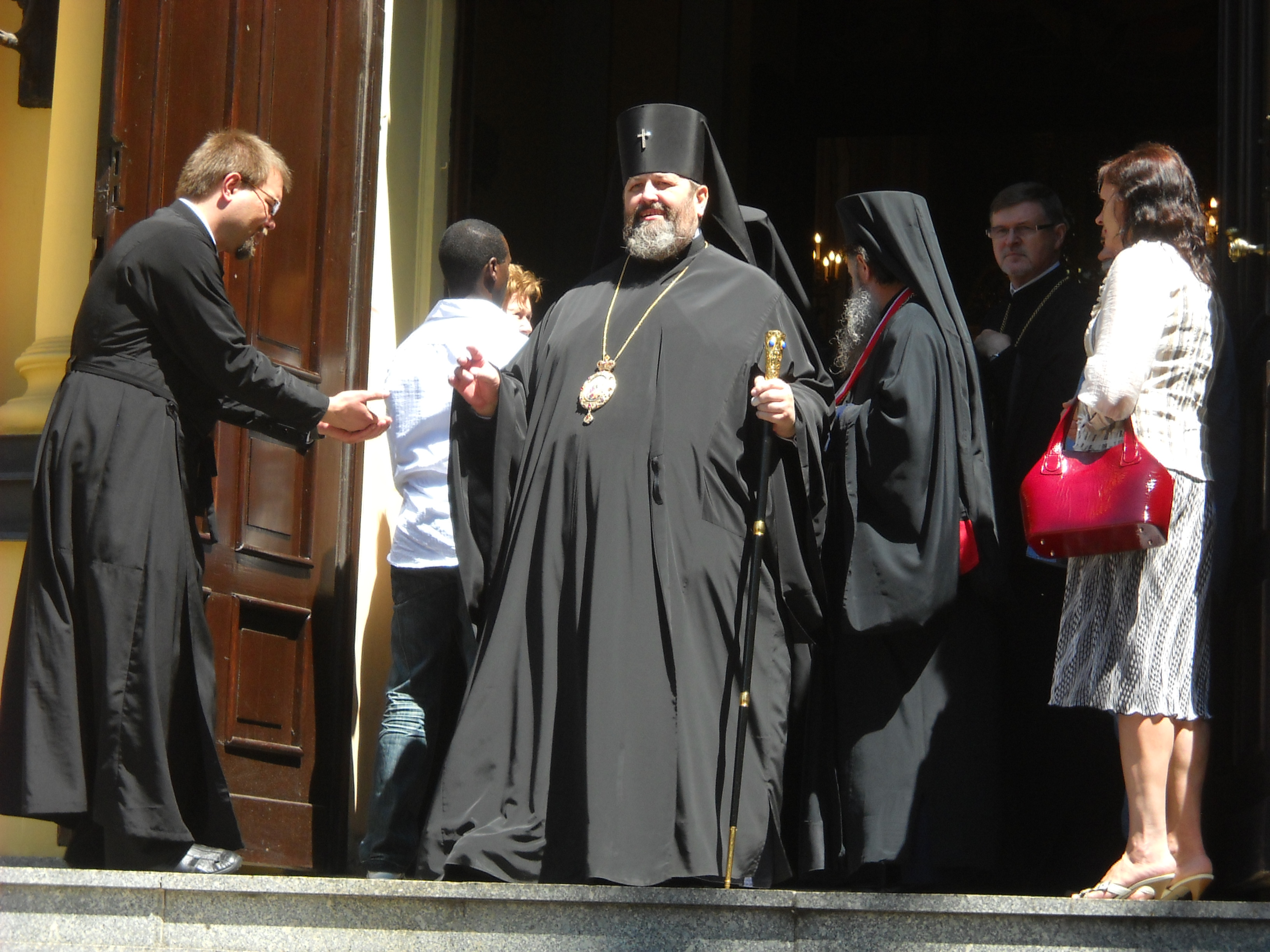
Archbishop Abel

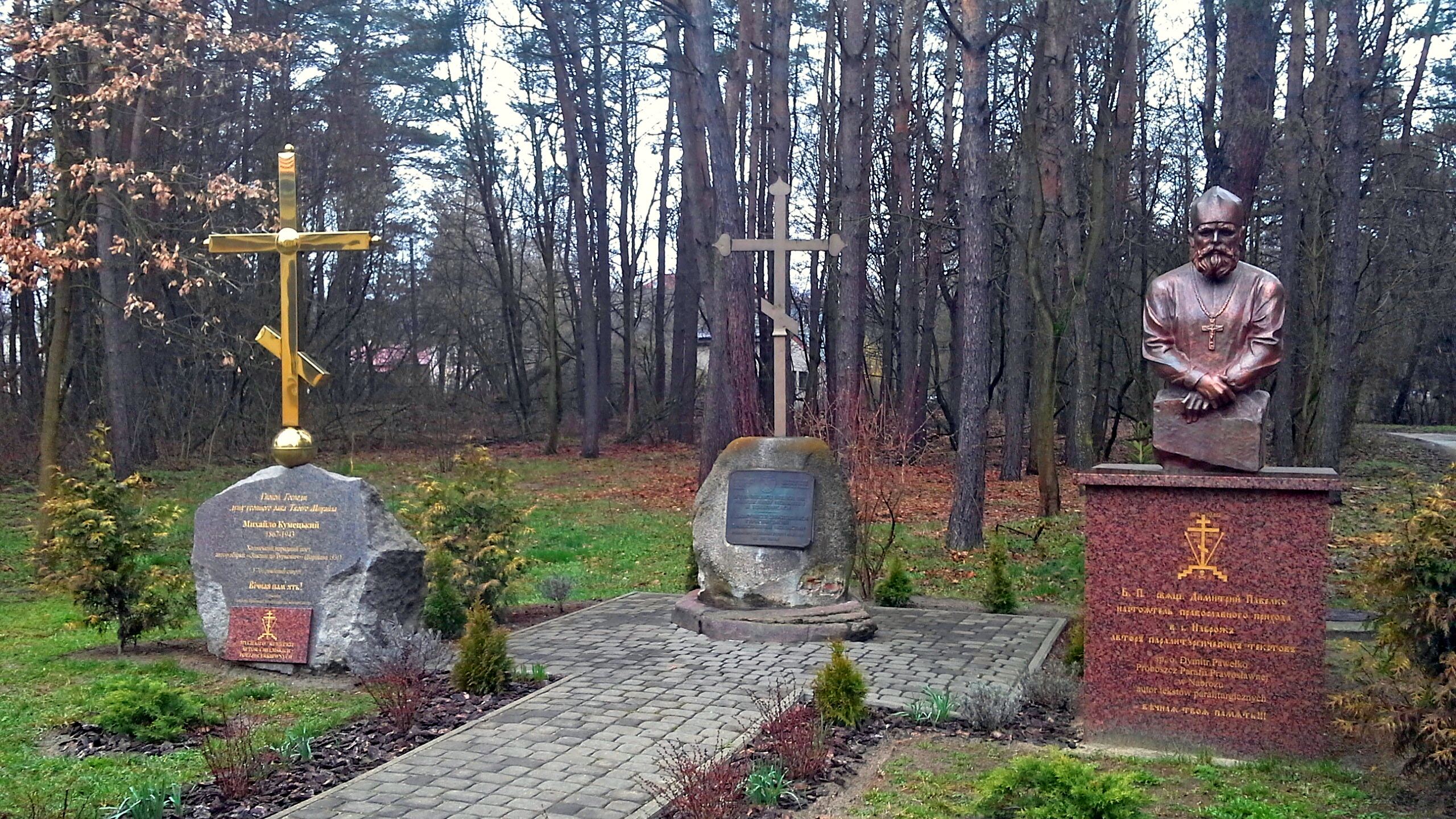
Monuments at the monastery in Turkowice, from the left: a cross commemorating Father Mychajło Kumecki, the author of paraliturgical songs; a cross commemorating the existence of the monastery in 1999; a monument to Father Dmytro Pawełko, the author of the paraliturgical song about Turkowice

In 1981, an Orthodox priest serving in Hrubieszów, Father Grzegorz Ostapkowicz, inspired by a letter from Athanasius (Martos), then a hierarch of the Russian Orthodox Church Outside of Russia, found a copy of the miraculous icon painted in 1928 by Piotr Zin in a chapel that had been devastated and turned into a lavatory. He took it from this place on the orders of Metropolitan Bazyli Doroszkiewicz of Warsaw and all Poland. The icon was transported to the Church of St. Nicholas in Tomaszów Lubelski and later to the monastery in Jabłeczna.

In 1993, Archbishop Abel of the Diocese of Lublin and Chełm made efforts to reclaim part of the former monastery buildings for the Polish Orthodox Church. Ultimately, the diocese received a substitute plot in Witków, as well as land and buildings of the former Plant Breeding Cooperative in Korczmin, and in 1999, an additional five ares of land on the grounds formerly occupied by the nuns. A commemorative cross with inscriptions in Polish and Ukrainian was erected at this site. At the same time, the Servant Sisters also sought the return of the buildings in Turkowice. However, their request was denied due to the lack of required documents confirming their ownership of the monastery during the interwar period.

In 2006, on the initiative of Archbishop Abel, the Diocese of Lublin and Chełm purchased one of the former monastery buildings, put up for auction by the Hrubieszów County Office (the Community Center, Czajnia). This building was converted into the Church of the Holy Mother of God. These actions by the Orthodox diocese met with protests from Senator Adam Biela, a professor at the John Paul II Catholic University of Lublin, who petitioned the Prime Minister of Poland to stop the Russification of the region, which he claimed was exemplified by the reactivation of the Orthodox monastery.

Simultaneously, the Polish Orthodox Church undertook efforts to restore female monastic life at this site. In 2007, Orthodox crosses were placed on the purchased building. On 28 August 2008, the female monastery in Turkowice was reactivated by decree of Archbishop Abel of Lublin and Chełm. The following year, he consecrated the monastery buildings. The monastery church houses the relics of the Holy Martyrs of Pendy and Father Sergius Zacharczuk, one of the Chełm and Podlasie martyrs. From then on, services for the nuns were conducted by clergy from the Zamość deanery. The renovation and adaptation of the purchased building for sacred purposes were made possible by the financial support of the faithful from other Orthodox churches and funds from the state treasury, as well as the European Regional Development Fund.

=== Functioning of the reestablished monastery since 2008 ===
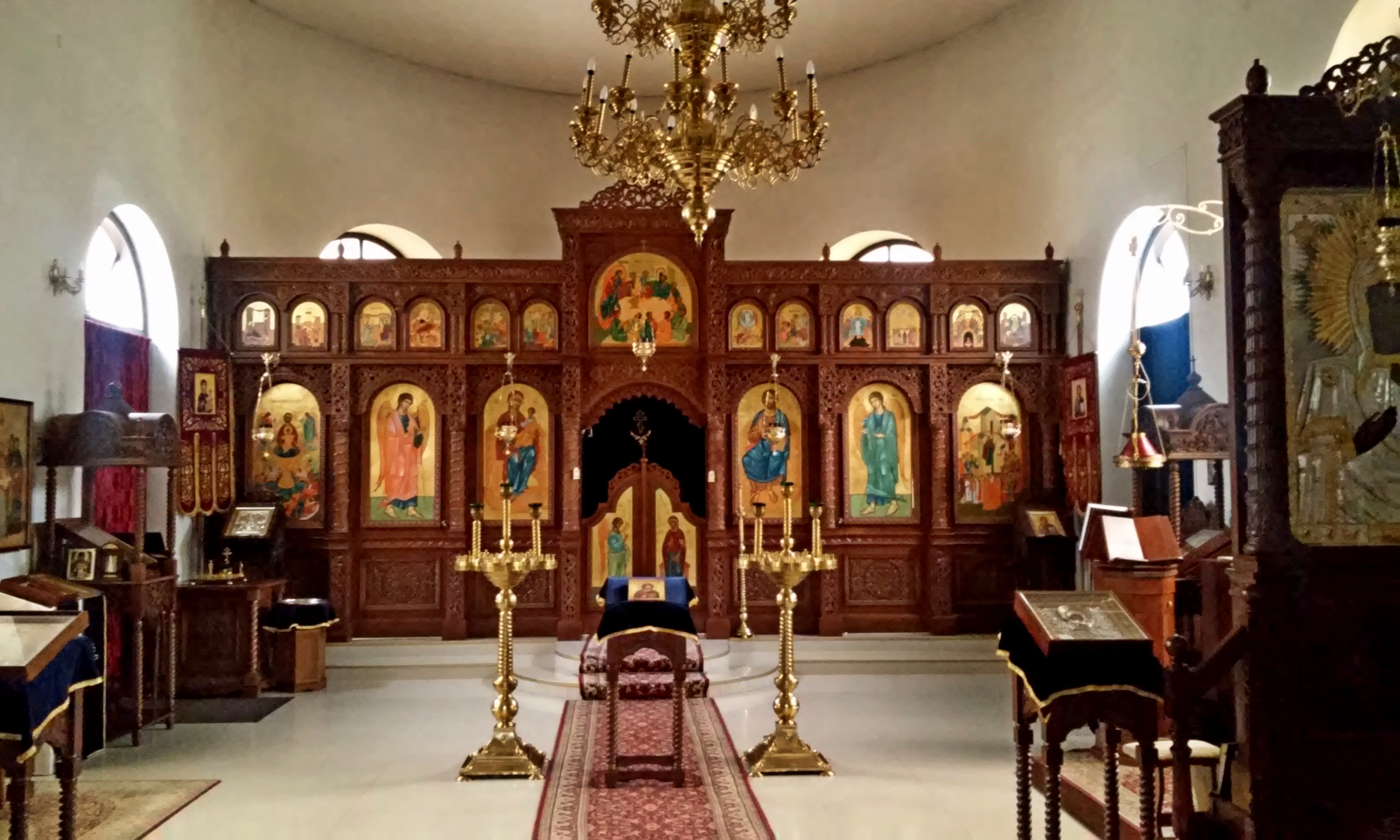
Interior of the monastic church

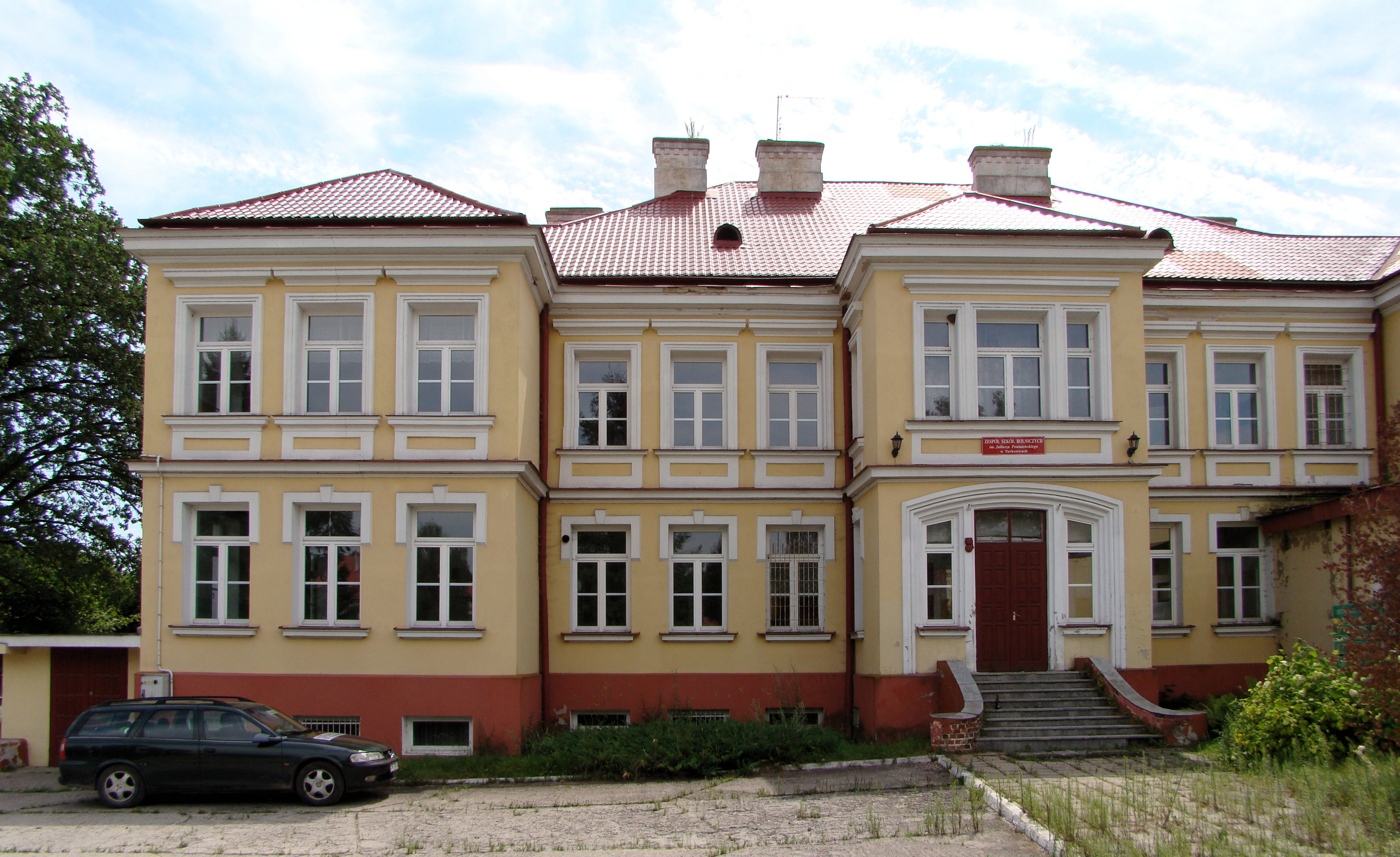
Building where the agricultural school was located

In 2008, the female monastery in Turkowice was reactivated. The community, initially consisting of six nuns and novices, was led by Sister Eufalia. On 21 September 2009, she was succeeded by Sister Leoniła Krawczuk (later Sister Elżbieta as of 5 December 2010) as the acting superior. The nuns who arrived in Turkowice had previously been part of the monastic community on Grabarka Holy Mount. The Turkowice community became the first female monastery in the Diocese of Lublin and Chełm. Monastic life in the reestablished monastery follows the same rules that were in place when the monastery was originally founded in 1903. The first perpetual monastic vows in the monastery were taken on 7 December 2009.

In 2010, during the annual celebrations in honor of the Deposition of the Robe of the Mother of God, held in Turkowice from 14 to 15 July, the monks from the Monastery of St. Onuphrius in Jabłeczna presented the nuns with the oldest copy of the Turkowice Icon of the Mother of God in Poland. Archbishop Abel also placed a relic of St. Sister Martyr Paraskeva (Matijeszyna) in the monastery. The relics of St. Paraskeva, canonized in 2000 as one of the New Martyrs and Confessors of Russia, were given to the Polish Orthodox Church by Metropolitan Hilarion of Volokolamsk.

In 2012, the community consisted of nine nuns – four from Grabarka and five other nuns, including two converts from Lutheranism from Slovakia and Hungary. The nuns engage in publishing work, having prepared the life of St. Paraskeva of Turkowice and released a CD with sermons by St. Nikolaj Velimirović. By 2022, the community numbered 9 nuns, including 4 full nuns and one novice. The monastery is likely the only one in Poland where church music during services is performed in accordance with the Byzantine musical tradition.

In 2013, the agricultural school occupying the remaining former monastery buildings was closed, and the buildings were put up for sale.

On 25 April 2014, the superior of the monastery, Sister Elżbieta (Krawczuk), was given the title of hegumenia. In the same year, a monument to Father Dmytro Pawełko, author of the paraliturgical song about Turkowice Wołyń Poczajiwom sływe, was erected on the monastery grounds.

In March 2019, construction began on a second church within the monastery, dedicated to St. Paraskeva (Matijeszyna). The church was completed and opened for use in July 2021. On 26 March 2022, Archbishop Abel consecrated a new monastery building.

== Controversies ==
The return of Orthodox nuns to Turkowice was met with protests from the local population, particularly from members of the newly established Society of Friends of the Turkowice Land. However, both local authorities and the monastery's superior claimed that the conflict did not escalate. After several years of the monastery's existence, the local population's attitude toward the nuns became entirely positive. Currently, there are no Orthodox Christians in Turkowice, only people with ancestors of that faith.

In 2013, Gazeta Wyborcza in Lublin reported that the dispute between the monastery and the local population had flared up again. The manifestation of this conflict was the refusal to grant the nuns permission to build a bell tower and a small church on the monastery's property. Additionally, Gmina Werbkowice was initially reluctant to approve the construction of a second residential building on the monastery grounds. Eventually, the monastery obtained permission for both the construction of the church and the residential building.

== Bibliography ==
- Mironowicz, Antoni (2001). Kościół prawosławny na ziemiach polskich w XIX i XX wieku (in Polish). Białystok: Wydawnictwo Uniwersytetu w Białymstoku. ISBN 83-7431-046-4.
- Pawluczuk, Urszula Anna (2007). Życie monastyczne w II Rzeczypospolitej (in Polish). Białystok: Wydawnictwo Uniwersytetu w Białymstoku. ISBN 978-83-7431-127-4.
- Pelica, Grzegorz Jacek (2007). Kościół prawosławny w województwie lubelskim (1918–1939) (in Polish). Lublin: Fundacja Dialog Narodów. ISBN 978-83-925882-0-7. OCLC 177030699.
- Kuprianowicz, G., ed. (2007). "A Turkowyczamy żywe wsia zemla Chołmśka nasza..." Prawosławna tradycja Turkowic (in Polish). Turkowice: Prawosławna Diecezja Lubelsko-Chełmska. ISBN 978-83-925910-0-9.
- Radziukiewicz, A. (2010). "Cuda Chołmszczyny". Przegląd Prawosławny (in Polish). 8 (302).
- Grzesiak, Krzysztof (2010). Diecezja lubelska wobec prawosławia w latach 1918–1939 (in Polish). Wydawnictwo Archidiecezjalne GAUDIUM. ISBN 978-83-7548-003-0.
