= 2022–23 Portland Trail Blazers season =

- Head coach: Chauncey Billups
- General manager: Joe Cronin
- Owner: Jody Allen
- Arena: Moda Center

Results
- Record: 33–49 (.402)
- Place: Division: 5th (Northwest); Conference: 13th (Western)
- Playoff finish: Did not qualify
- Stats at Basketball Reference

Local media
- Television: Root Sports Northwest
- Radio: KPOJ, Portland Trail Blazers Radio

The 2022–23 Portland Trail Blazers season was the 53rd season of the franchise in the National Basketball Association (NBA).

On March 31, 2023, the Trail Blazers were eliminated from play-in/playoff contention for the second consecutive season following the Los Angeles Lakers' win over the Minnesota Timberwolves. This was the final season before the trading of franchise player Damian Lillard, who had played with the team since 2012.

== Draft picks ==
Round	Pick	Player	Position	Nationality	School / club team
1	7	Shaedon Sharpe	SG	Canada	Kentucky
2	57	Jabari Walker	PF	United States	Colorado

The Trail Blazers entered the draft holding one first round pick and two second round picks.

== Roster ==
2022–23 Portland Trail Blazers roster
Players

Pos.	No.	Player	Height	Weight	DOB	From
C	41	Ibou Badji (TW)	7 ft 1 in (2.16 m)	240 lb (109 kg)	2002-10-13	Senegal
F	21	John Jr. Butler (TW)	7 ft 0 in (2.13 m)	190 lb (86 kg)	2002-12-04	Florida State
C	24	Drew Eubanks	6 ft 10 in (2.08 m)	245 lb (111 kg)	1997-02-01	Oregon State
F	9	Jerami Grant	6 ft 8 in (2.03 m)	210 lb (95 kg)	1994-03-12	Syracuse
G	6	Keon Johnson	6 ft 3 in (1.91 m)	185 lb (84 kg)	2002-03-10	Tennessee
F	11	Kevin Knox II	6 ft 7 in (2.01 m)	215 lb (98 kg)	1999-08-11	Kentucky
G	0	Damian Lillard	6 ft 2 in (1.88 m)	195 lb (88 kg)	1990-07-15	Weber State
G/F	10	Nassir Little	6 ft 5 in (1.96 m)	220 lb (100 kg)	2000-02-11	North Carolina
C	27	Jusuf Nurkić	7 ft 0 in (2.13 m)	290 lb (132 kg)	1994-08-23	Bosnia and Herzegovina
G/F	5	Cam Reddish	6 ft 7 in (2.01 m)	217 lb (98 kg)	1999-09-01	Duke
G	17	Shaedon Sharpe	6 ft 5 in (1.96 m)	200 lb (91 kg)	2003-05-30	Dream City Christian (AZ)
G	1	Anfernee Simons	6 ft 3 in (1.91 m)	181 lb (82 kg)	1999-06-08	IMG Academy (FL)
G	4	Matisse Thybulle	6 ft 5 in (1.96 m)	200 lb (91 kg)	1997-03-04	Washington
F	34	Jabari Walker	6 ft 7 in (2.01 m)	210 lb (95 kg)	2002-07-30	Colorado
F	2	Trendon Watford	6 ft 8 in (2.03 m)	237 lb (108 kg)	2000-11-09	LSU
G/F	23	Jeenathan Williams	6 ft 5 in (1.96 m)	205 lb (93 kg)	1999-02-12	Buffalo
G/F	26	Justise Winslow	6 ft 6 in (1.98 m)	222 lb (101 kg)	1997-03-18	Duke

Coaches
Head coach
- Chauncey Billups
Assistant(s)
- Rodney Billups
- Scott Brooks
- Jonah Herscu
- Steve Hetzel
- Roy Rogers

Legend
- (DP) Unsigned draft pick
- (FA) Free agent
- (S) Suspended
- (GL) On assignment to G League
- (TW) Two-way affiliate player
- Injured

Roster
Updated: April 9, 2023

== Standings ==
=== Division ===
Northwest Division	W	L	PCT	GB	Home	Road	Div	GP
c – Denver Nuggets	53	29	.646	–	34‍–‍7	19‍–‍22	10–6	82
x – Minnesota Timberwolves	42	40	.512	11.0	22‍–‍19	20‍–‍21	8–8	82
pi – Oklahoma City Thunder	40	42	.488	13.0	24‍–‍17	16‍–‍25	9–7	82
Utah Jazz	37	45	.451	16.0	23‍–‍18	14‍–‍27	6–10	82
Portland Trail Blazers	33	49	.402	20.0	17‍–‍24	16‍–‍25	7–9	82

=== Conference ===
Western Conference
#	Team	W	L	PCT	GB	GP
1	c – Denver Nuggets *	53	29	.646	–	82
2	y – Memphis Grizzlies *	51	31	.622	2.0	82
3	y – Sacramento Kings *	48	34	.585	5.0	82
4	x – Phoenix Suns	45	37	.549	8.0	82
5	x – Los Angeles Clippers	44	38	.537	9.0	82
6	x – Golden State Warriors	44	38	.537	9.0	82
7	x – Los Angeles Lakers	43	39	.524	10.0	82
8	x – Minnesota Timberwolves	42	40	.512	11.0	82
9	pi – New Orleans Pelicans	42	40	.512	11.0	82
10	pi – Oklahoma City Thunder	40	42	.488	13.0	82
11	Dallas Mavericks	38	44	.463	15.0	82
12	Utah Jazz	37	45	.451	16.0	82
13	Portland Trail Blazers	33	49	.402	20.0	82
14	Houston Rockets	22	60	.268	31.0	82
15	San Antonio Spurs	22	60	.268	31.0	82

== Game log ==
=== Preseason ===
2022 preseason game log
Total: 1–4 (Home: 1–1; Road: 0–3)
Preseason: 1–4 (home: 1–1; road: 0–3)

Game	Date	Team	Score	High points	High rebounds	High assists	Location Attendance	Record
1	October 3	vs. L.A. Clippers	L 97–102	Damian Lillard (16)	Josh Hart (10)	Josh Hart (4)	Climate Pledge Arena; 18,440	0–1
2	October 4	Utah	L 101–118	Damian Lillard (21)	Josh Hart (7)	Damian Lillard (6)	Moda Center; 15,197	0–2
3	October 6	Maccabi Ra'anana	W 138–85	Shaedon Sharpe (27)	Jabari Walker (7)	Keon Johnson (11)	Moda Center; 10,622	1–2
4	October 9	@ Sacramento	L 94–126	Jerami Grant (17)	Jusuf Nurkić (9)	Damian Lillard (6)	Golden 1 Center; 14,250	1–3
5	October 11	@ Golden State	L 98–131	Shaedon Sharpe (17)	Josh Hart (8)	Keon Johnson (5)	Chase Center; 18,064	1–4

2022–23 season schedule

=== Regular season ===
2022–23 game log
Total: 33–49 (Home: 17–24; Road: 16–25)
October: 5–1 (home: 3–1; road: 2–0)

Game	Date	Team	Score	High points	High rebounds	High assists	Location Attendance	Record
1	October 19	@ Sacramento	W 115–108	Jerami Grant (23)	Grant, Winslow (8)	Damian Lillard (8)	Golden 1 Center; 17,611	1–0
2	October 21	Phoenix	W 113–111 (OT)	Damian Lillard (41)	Jusuf Nurkić (17)	Hart, Lillard, Simons (3)	Moda Center; 19,393	2–0
3	October 23	@ L.A. Lakers	W 106–104	Damian Lillard (41)	Josh Hart (16)	Josh Hart (5)	Crypto.com Arena; 18,997	3–0
4	October 24	Denver	W 135–110	Damian Lillard (31)	Jusuf Nurkić (12)	Damian Lillard (8)	Moda Center; 18,111	4–0
5	October 26	Miami	L 98–119	Damian Lillard (22)	Jusuf Nurkić (9)	Josh Hart (6)	Moda Center; 18,578	4–1
6	October 28	Houston	W 125–111	Anfernee Simons (30)	Jusuf Nurkić (15)	Simons, Winslow (7)	Moda Center; 19,082	5–1

November : 6–10 (home: 1–4; road: 5–6)

Game	Date	Team	Score	High points	High rebounds	High assists	Location Attendance	Record
7	November 2	Memphis	L 106–111	Anfernee Simons (31)	Jusuf Nurkić (13)	Anfernee Simons (8)	Moda Center; 19,462	5–2
8	November 4	@ Phoenix	W 108–106	Jerami Grant (30)	Justise Winslow (9)	Justise Winslow (9)	Footprint Center; 17,071	6–2
9	November 5	@ Phoenix	L 82–102	Jerami Grant (14)	Grant, Hart (7)	Josh Hart (8)	Footprint Center; 17,071	6–3
10	November 7	@ Miami	W 110–107	Anfernee Simons (25)	Jusuf Nurkić (11)	Josh Hart (12)	FTX Arena; 19,600	7–3
11	November 9	@ Charlotte	W 105–95	Damian Lillard (26)	Josh Hart (11)	Damian Lillard (7)	Spectrum Center; 14,774	8–3
12	November 10	@ New Orleans	W 106–95	Jerami Grant (27)	Eubanks, Grant, Winslow (8)	Simons, Winslow (6)	Smoothie King Center; 14,289	9–3
13	November 12	@ Dallas	L 112–117	Jerami Grant (37)	Josh Hart (9)	Damian Lillard (12)	American Airlines Center; 20,277	9–4
14	November 15	San Antonio	W 117–110	Jerami Grant (29)	Jerami Grant (8)	Damian Lillard (11)	Moda Center; 19,012	10–4
15	November 17	Brooklyn	L 107–109	Damian Lillard (25)	Jusuf Nurkić (8)	Damian Lillard (11)	Moda Center; 19,193	10–5
16	November 19	Utah	L 113–118	Anfernee Simons (23)	Hart, Simons (8)	Lillard, Simons (7)	Moda Center; 19,595	10–6
17	November 21	@ Milwaukee	L 111–119	Anfernee Simons (29)	Jusuf Nurkić (10)	Anfernee Simons (5)	Fiserv Forum; 17,341	10–7
18	November 23	@ Cleveland	L 96–114	Jusuf Nurkić (22)	Eubanks, Nurkić (6)	Simons, Winslow (6)	Rocket Mortgage FieldHouse; 19,432	10–8
19	November 25	@ New York	W 132–129 (OT)	Jerami Grant (44)	Josh Hart (19)	Jusuf Nurkić (7)	Madison Square Garden; 19,812	11–8
20	November 27	@ Brooklyn	L 97–111	Jerami Grant (29)	Jusuf Nurkić (14)	Simons, Winslow (6)	Barclays Center; 17,732	11–9
21	November 29	L.A. Clippers	L 112–118	Anfernee Simons (37)	Justise Winslow (13)	Jusuf Nurkić (7)	Moda Center; 17,251	11–10
22	November 30	@ L.A. Lakers	L 109–128	Jerami Grant (27)	Nurkić, Watford (10)	Anfernee Simons (8)	Crypto.com Arena; 18,560	11–11

December : 7–6 (home: 4–1; road: 3–5)

Game	Date	Team	Score	High points	High rebounds	High assists	Location Attendance	Record
23	December 3	@ Utah	W 116–111	Anfernee Simons (45)	Nurkić, Watford (14)	Grant, Winslow (5)	Vivint Arena; 18,206	12–11
24	December 4	Indiana	W 116–100	Jerami Grant (28)	Josh Hart (10)	Lillard, Simons (6)	Moda Center; 17,579	13–11
25	December 8	Denver	L 120–121	Damian Lillard (40)	Jusuf Nurkić (9)	Damian Lillard (12)	Moda Center; 18,189	13–12
26	December 10	Minnesota	W 124–118	Damian Lillard (36)	Jusuf Nurkić (15)	Damian Lillard (8)	Moda Center; 18,324	14–12
27	December 12	Minnesota	W 133–112	Damian Lillard (38)	Jusuf Nurkić (16)	Justise Winslow (10)	Moda Center; 18,021	15–12
28	December 14	@ San Antonio	W 128–112	Damian Lillard (37)	Josh Hart (10)	Damian Lillard (8)	AT&T Center; 13,657	16–12
29	December 16	@ Dallas	L 110–130	Damian Lillard (24)	Trendon Watford (11)	Trendon Watford (6)	American Airlines Center; 20,191	16–13
30	December 17	@ Houston	W 107–95	Anfernee Simons (32)	Josh Hart (13)	Damian Lillard (10)	Toyota Center; 16,217	17–13
31	December 19	@ Oklahoma City	L 121–123	Damian Lillard (28)	Grant, Hart (8)	Hart, Lillard (6)	Paycom Center; 14,672	17–14
32	December 21	@ Oklahoma City	L 98–101	Jerami Grant (17)	Eubanks, Watford (7)	Damian Lillard (8)	Paycom Center; 15,107	17–15
33	December 23	@ Denver	L 107–120	Damian Lillard (34)	Josh Hart (11)	Damian Lillard (8)	Ball Arena; 19,619	17–16
34	December 26	Charlotte	W 124–113	Jerami Grant (32)	Jusuf Nurkić (15)	Damian Lillard (9)	Moda Center; 19,530	18–16
35	December 30	@ Golden State	L 112–118	Damian Lillard (34)	Josh Hart (11)	Josh Hart (7)	Chase Center; 18,064	18–17

January : 6–9 (home: 6–5; road: 0–4)

Game	Date	Team	Score	High points	High rebounds	High assists	Location Attendance	Record
36	January 2	Detroit	W 135–104	Jerami Grant (36)	Drew Eubanks (10)	Damian Lillard (10)	Moda Center; 19,393	19–17
37	January 4	@ Minnesota	L 106–113	Damian Lillard (27)	Jusuf Nurkić (8)	Damian Lillard (6)	Target Center; 15,434	19–18
38	January 6	@ Indiana	L 99–108	Anfernee Simons (20)	Jusuf Nurkić (19)	Hart, Lillard (8)	Gainbridge Fieldhouse; 16,548	19–19
39	January 8	@ Toronto	L 105–117	Damian Lillard (34)	Jusuf Nurkić (18)	Damian Lillard (8)	Scotiabank Arena; 19,800	19–20
40	January 10	Orlando	L 106–109	Damian Lillard (30)	Josh Hart (13)	Anfernee Simons (7)	Moda Center; 18,176	19–21
41	January 12	Cleveland	L 113–119	Damian Lillard (50)	Jusuf Nurkić (12)	Anfernee Simons (5)	Moda Center; 18,105	19–22
42	January 14	Dallas	W 136–119	Damian Lillard (36)	Jusuf Nurkić (11)	Damian Lillard (10)	Moda Center; 19,393	20–22
43	January 15	Dallas	W 140–123	Damian Lillard (40)	Josh Hart (12)	Damian Lillard (6)	Moda Center; 19,393	21–22
44	January 17	@ Denver	L 113–122	Damian Lillard (44)	Jusuf Nurkić (10)	Damian Lillard (8)	Ball Arena; 18,258	21–23
45	January 19	Philadelphia	L 95–105	Damian Lillard (25)	Jusuf Nurkić (11)	Damian Lillard (11)	Moda Center; 18,113	21–24
46	January 22	L.A. Lakers	L 112–121	Anfernee Simons (31)	Drew Eubanks (11)	Damian Lillard (10)	Moda Center; 19,393	21–25
47	January 23	San Antonio	W 147–127	Damian Lillard (37)	Jusuf Nurkić (11)	Damian Lillard (12)	Moda Center; 17,874	22–25
48	January 25	Utah	W 134–124	Damian Lillard (60)	Drew Eubanks (10)	Anfernee Simons (9)	Moda Center; 18,154	23–25
49	January 28	Toronto	L 105–123	Damian Lillard (30)	Jerami Grant (8)	Anfernee Simons (4)	Moda Center; 19,393	23–26
50	January 30	Atlanta	W 129–125	Damian Lillard (42)	Josh Hart (12)	Anfernee Simons (7)	Moda Center; 18,262	24–26

February : 5–6 (home: 3–3; road: 2–3)

Game	Date	Team	Score	High points	High rebounds	High assists	Location Attendance	Record
51	February 1	@ Memphis	W 122–112	Damian Lillard (42)	Drew Eubanks (11)	Damian Lillard (10)	FedExForum; 14,589	25–26
52	February 3	@ Washington	W 124–116	Anfernee Simons (33)	Josh Hart (9)	Lillard, Simons (6)	Capital One Arena; 20,476	26–26
53	February 4	@ Chicago	L 121–129	Damian Lillard (40)	Josh Hart (12)	Hart, Lillard, Simons (5)	United Center; 20,135	26–27
54	February 6	Milwaukee	L 108–127	Damian Lillard (28)	Josh Hart (8)	Eubanks, Lillard, Simons (5)	Moda Center; 18,110	26–28
55	February 8	Golden State	W 125–122	Damian Lillard (33)	Damian Lillard (10)	Damian Lillard (11)	Moda Center; 18 450	27–28
56	February 10	Oklahoma City	L 129–138	Damian Lillard (38)	Drew Eubanks (8)	Damian Lillard (9)	Moda Center; 19,424	27–29
57	February 13	L.A. Lakers	W 127–115	Damian Lillard (40)	Drew Eubanks (9)	Anfernee Simons (6)	Moda Center; 18,299	28–29
58	February 14	Washington	L 101–126	Damian Lillard (39)	Drew Eubanks (11)	Damian Lillard (6)	Moda Center; 18,004	28–30
59	February 23	@ Sacramento	L 116–133	Nassir Little (26)	Drew Eubanks (7)	Ryan Arcidiacono (6)	Golden 1 Center; 18,041	28–31
60	February 26	Houston	W 131–114	Damian Lillard (71)	Nassir Little (9)	Damian Lillard (6)	Moda Center; 19,215	29–31
61	February 28	@ Golden State	L 105–123	Damian Lillard (25)	Drew Eubanks (8)	Lillard, Watford (7)	Chase Center; 18,064	29–32

March : 3–13 (home: 0–9; road: 3–4)

Game	Date	Team	Score	High points	High rebounds	High assists	Location Attendance	Record
62	March 1	New Orleans	L 110–121	Damian Lillard (41)	Lillard, Thybulle (8)	Trendon Watford (6)	Moda Center; 18,566	29–33
63	March 3	@ Atlanta	L 111–129	Damian Lillard (33)	Drew Eubanks (7)	Damian Lillard (8)	State Farm Arena; 17,521	29–34
64	March 5	@ Orlando	W 122–119	Damian Lillard (41)	Damian Lillard (9)	Jerami Grant (7)	Amway Center; 18,846	30–34
65	March 6	@ Detroit	W 110–104	Damian Lillard (31)	Damian Lillard (13)	Damian Lillard (12)	Little Caesars Arena; 16,989	31–34
66	March 8	@ Boston	L 93–115	Damian Lillard (27)	Trendon Watford (10)	Damian Lillard (8)	TD Garden; 19,156	31–35
67	March 10	@ Philadelphia	L 119–120	Anfernee Simons (34)	Jerami Grant (10)	Damian Lillard (11)	Wells Fargo Center; 21,001	31–36
68	March 12	@ New Orleans	L 110–127	Anfernee Simons (17)	Eubanks, Watford (7)	Grant, Little, Simons (4)	Smoothie King Center; 16,676	31–37
69	March 14	New York	L 107–123	Damian Lillard (38)	Jusuf Nurkić (10)	Damian Lillard (7)	Moda Center; 19,488	31–38
70	March 17	Boston	L 112–126	Damian Lillard (41)	Nurkić, Watford (8)	Trendon Watford (8)	Moda Center; 19,393	31–39
71	March 19	L.A. Clippers	L 102–117	Jusuf Nurkić (23)	Jusuf Nurkić (11)	Damian Lillard (9)	Moda Center; 18,714	31–40
72	March 22	@ Utah	W 127–115	Damian Lillard (30)	Sharpe, Watford (9)	Damian Lillard (12)	Vivint Arena	32–40
73	March 24	Chicago	L 96–124	Shaedon Sharpe (24)	Drew Eubanks (7)	Arcidiacono, Johnson (6)	Moda Center; 19,393	32–41
74	March 26	Oklahoma City	L 112–118	Shaedon Sharpe (29)	Drew Eubanks (10)	Arcidiacono, Johnson (5)	Moda Center; 18,626	32–42
75	March 27	New Orleans	L 90–124	Keon Johnson (20)	Shaedon Sharpe (8)	Keon Johnson (6)	Moda Center; 17,943	32–43
76	March 29	Sacramento	L 80–120	Shaedon Sharpe (30)	Kevin Knox II (12)	Shaedon Sharpe (7)	Moda Center; 18,550	32–44
77	March 31	Sacramento	L 114–138	Shaedon Sharpe (27)	Drew Eubanks (10)	Skylar Mays (6)	Moda Center; 18,389	32–45

April : 1–4 (home: 0–1; road: 1–3)

Game	Date	Team	Score	High points	High rebounds	High assists	Location Attendance	Record
78	April 2	@ Minnesota	W 107–105	Shaedon Sharpe (27)	Jabari Walker (7)	Skylar Mays (9)	Target Center; 18,978	33–45
79	April 4	@ Memphis	L 109–119	Skylar Mays (24)	Eubanks, Mays, Sharpe (8)	Skylar Mays (7)	FedEx Forum; 17,558	33–46
80	April 6	@ San Antonio	L 127–129	Kevin Knox II (24)	Drew Eubanks (9)	Shaquille Harrison (9)	Moody Center; 16,023	33–47
81	April 8	@ L.A. Clippers	L 125–136	Kevin Knox II (30)	Kevin Knox II (11)	Shaquille Harrison (10)	Crypto.com Arena; 19,068	33–48
82	April 9	Golden State	L 101–157	Skylar Mays (21)	Shaedon Sharpe (7)	Skylar Mays (12)	Moda Center; 19,731	33–49

2022–23 season schedule

== Player statistics ==
Legend
GP	Games played	GS	Games started	MPG	Minutes per game
FG%	Field-goal percentage	3P%	3-point field-goal percentage	FT%	Free-throw percentage
RPG	Rebounds per game	APG	Assists per game	SPG	Steals per game
BPG	Blocks per game	PPG	Points per game

=== Regular season ===
Portland Trail Blazers statistics
Player	GP	GS	MPG	FG%	3P%	FT%	RPG	APG	SPG	BPG	PPG
Shaedon Sharpe	80	15	22.2	.472	.360	.714	3.0	1.2	.5	.3	9.9
Drew Eubanks	78	28	20.3	.641	.389	.664	5.4	1.3	.5	1.3	6.6
Jerami Grant	63	63	35.7	.475	.401	.813	4.5	2.4	.8	.8	20.5
Anfernee Simons	62	62	35.0	.447	.377	.894	2.6	4.1	.7	.2	21.1
Trendon Watford	62	12	19.1	.560	.391	.720	3.8	2.1	.5	.2	7.4
Damian Lillard	58	58	36.3	.463	.371	.914	4.8	7.3	.9	.3	32.2
Jabari Walker	56	0	11.1	.419	.286	.756	2.3	.6	.2	.2	3.9
Nassir Little	54	4	18.1	.442	.367	.717	2.6	.9	.4	.4	6.6
Jusuf Nurkić	52	52	26.8	.519	.361	.661	9.1	2.9	.8	.8	13.3
Josh Hart^{†}	51	51	33.4	.504	.304	.731	8.2	3.9	1.1	.2	9.5
Keon Johnson	40	0	10.4	.376	.346	.659	1.1	1.5	.5	.2	4.7
Justise Winslow	29	11	26.8	.409	.311	.714	5.0	3.4	1.0	.4	6.8
Matisse Thybulle^{†}	22	22	27.7	.438	.388	.625	3.5	1.4	1.7	.8	7.4
Kevin Knox II^{†}	21	4	17.1	.444	.314	.741	3.3	.9	.5	.0	8.5
Cam Reddish^{†}	20	12	27.6	.443	.318	.833	2.9	1.9	1.2	.3	11.0
John Butler Jr.	19	1	11.6	.321	.229	.750	.9	.6	.4	.5	2.4
Greg Brown III	16	0	5.8	.393	.143	.417	1.2	.2	.3	.3	1.8
Gary Payton II^{†}	15	1	17.0	.585	.529	1.000	2.6	1.5	1.1	.1	4.1
Ryan Arcidiacono^{†}	9	4	16.2	.250	.350		1.2	2.3	.3	.0	2.6
Skylar Mays	6	6	31.5	.500	.462	.923	3.2	8.3	1.0	.2	15.3
Nate Williams	5	4	25.4	.615	.375	.667	3.0	2.0	.6	.4	10.6
Shaquille Harrison	5	0	24.0	.417	.300	.733	4.4	6.0	2.2	.4	8.8
Justin Minaya	4	0	22.3	.304	.250	.000	3.8	1.0	.5	1.3	4.3
Chance Comanche	1	0	21.0	.600		.250	3.0	.0	.0	1.0	7.0

- ^{†} Denotes player spent time with another team in the season. Stats reflect time with the Trail Blazers only.

== Transactions ==
=== Overview ===
Players Added

Via trade
- Jerami Grant

Via free agency

- Gary Payton II
Players Lost

Via trade

Via free agency

- Joe Ingles
- Keljin Blevins
- Ben McLemore
- C. J. Elleby
- Elijah Hughes

Waived

- Eric Bledsoe

=== Trades ===
July 6, 2022	To Portland Trail Blazers Jerami Grant; Draft rights to Ismaël Kamagate (No. 46)	To Detroit Pistons Draft rights to Gabriele Procida (No. 36); 2025 MIL protected first-round pick 2025 DET second-round pick 2026 POR second-round pick
July 6, 2022	To Portland Trail Blazers 2024 second-round pick	To Denver Nuggets Draft rights to Ismaël Kamagate (No. 46)
February 9, 2023	Four-team trade	
February 9, 2023	To Portland Trail Blazers Kevin Knox II; 5 future second-round picks	To Golden State Warriors Gary Payton II; 2 future ATL second-round picks
February 9, 2023	To Detroit Pistons James Wiseman	To Atlanta Hawks Saddiq Bey
February 9, 2023	Four-team trade	
February 9, 2023	To Portland Trail Blazers Cam Reddish; Matisse Thybulle; Ryan Arcidiacono; 2023 NYK protected first-round pick	To Philadelphia 76ers Jalen McDaniels; 2024 CHA second-round pick 2029 POR second-round pick
February 9, 2023	To Charlotte Hornets Svi Mykhailiuk; 2023 PHI second-round pick 2027 POR second-round pick	To New York Knicks Josh Hart

=== Free agency ===
==== Re-signed ====
Player	Signed
Anfernee Simons	July 6, 2022
Jusuf Nurkić	July 6, 2022
Drew Eubanks	July 7, 2022

==== Additions ====
Player	Signed	Former team
Gary Payton II	July 6, 2022	Golden State Warriors
Chance Comanche	April 9, 2023	Stockton Kings

==== Subtractions ====
Player	Reason left	New team
Joe Ingles	Free agency	Milwaukee Bucks
Keljin Blevins	Free agency	
Ben McLemore	Free agency	
C. J. Elleby	Free agency	Minnesota Timberwolves
Elijah Hughes	Free agency	
Eric Bledsoe	Waived	
