= 2024–25 Portland Trail Blazers season =

- Head coach: Chauncey Billups
- General manager: Joe Cronin
- Owner: Jody Allen
- Arena: Moda Center

Results
- Record: 36–46 (.439)
- Place: Division: 4th (Northwest); Conference: 12th (Western)
- Playoff finish: Did not qualify
- Stats at Basketball Reference

Local media
- Television: Rip City Television Network (Note: Affiliates include: KATU-DT2 (Portland, Oregon until December 30, 2024.); KUNP (Portland, Oregon from January 2, 2025 onward.); KUNS-DT2 (Seattle, Washington); KTVL-DT4 (Medford, Oregon); KVAL-DT2 (Eugene, Oregon); KCBY-DT2 (Coos Bay, Oregon); KPIC-DT2 (Roseburg, Oregon); KIMA-DT3 (Yakima, Washington); KEPR-DT3 (Pasco, Washington)); BlazerVision
- Radio: KPOJ

The 2024–25 Portland Trail Blazers season was the 55th season of the franchise in the National Basketball Association (NBA). Finishing the previous season with a 21–61 record, the Trail Blazers managed to improve on their record from last year with a 112–89 win over the Indiana Pacers.

On April 6, despite their win over the San Antonio Spurs, the Trail Blazers were eliminated from playoff contention for the fourth straight season following the Sacramento Kings win over the Cleveland Cavaliers.

The Portland Trail Blazers drew an average home attendance of 17,542, the 18th-highest of all NBA teams.

== Draft picks ==
Round	Pick	Player	Position	Nationality	School / club team
1	7	Donovan Clingan	C	United States	UConn
1	14	Bub Carrington	PG	United States	Pittsburgh
2	34	Tyler Kolek	PG	United States	Marquette
2	40	Osasere Ighadaro	PF	United States	Marquette

The Trail Blazers entered the draft (which was two days instead of one like it had been since the NBA draft was shortened down to two rounds in 1989) holding two first-round picks and two second-round picks. All picks except the 7th pick were acquired through previous trades.

== Roster ==
2024–25 Portland Trail Blazers roster
Players

Pos.	No.	Player	Height	Weight	DOB	From
F	8	Deni Avdija	6 ft 9 in (2.06 m)	240 lb (109 kg)	2001-01-03	Israel
C	2	Deandre Ayton	7 ft 0 in (2.13 m)	252 lb (114 kg)	1998-07-23	Arizona
G	5	Dalano Banton	6 ft 8 in (2.03 m)	203 lb (92 kg)	1999-11-07	Nebraska
F	33	Toumani Camara	6 ft 7 in (2.01 m)	229 lb (104 kg)	2000-05-08	Dayton
G/F	91	Sidy Cissoko (TW)	6 ft 6 in (1.98 m)	200 lb (91 kg)	2004-04-02	France
C	23	Donovan Clingan	7 ft 2 in (2.18 m)	280 lb (127 kg)	2004-02-23	Connecticut
F	9	Jerami Grant	6 ft 7 in (2.01 m)	210 lb (95 kg)	1994-03-12	Syracuse
G	00	Scoot Henderson	6 ft 3 in (1.91 m)	206 lb (93 kg)	2004-02-03	Carlton J. Kell HS (GA)
G	11	Bryce McGowens (TW)	6 ft 6 in (1.98 m)	190 lb (86 kg)	2002-11-08	Nebraska
F	10	Justin Minaya (TW)	6 ft 5 in (1.96 m)	205 lb (93 kg)	1999-03-26	Providence
F	24	Kris Murray	6 ft 8 in (2.03 m)	216 lb (98 kg)	2000-08-19	Iowa
C	26	Duop Reath	6 ft 9 in (2.06 m)	245 lb (111 kg)	1996-06-26	LSU
G	21	Rayan Rupert	6 ft 6 in (1.98 m)	195 lb (88 kg)	2004-05-31	France
G/F	17	Shaedon Sharpe	6 ft 5 in (1.96 m)	208 lb (94 kg)	2003-05-30	Dream City Christian (AZ)
G	1	Anfernee Simons	6 ft 3 in (1.91 m)	200 lb (91 kg)	1999-06-08	IMG Academy (FL)
G/F	4	Matisse Thybulle	6 ft 5 in (1.96 m)	201 lb (91 kg)	1997-03-04	Washington
F	34	Jabari Walker	6 ft 7 in (2.01 m)	237 lb (108 kg)	2002-07-30	Colorado
C	35	Robert Williams III	6 ft 9 in (2.06 m)	249 lb (113 kg)	1997-10-17	Texas A&M

Coaches
Head coach
- Chauncey Billups
Assistant(s)
- Nate Bjorkgren
- Ronnie Burrell
- Chris Fleming
- Jonah Herscu
- Roy Rogers
- Mark Tyndale

Legend
- (DP) Unsigned draft pick
- (FA) Free agent
- (S) Suspended
- (GL) On assignment to G League
- (TW) Two-way affiliate player
- Injured

Roster
Updated: February 4, 2025

== Standings ==
=== Division ===
Northwest Division	W	L	PCT	GB	Home	Road	Div	GP
z – Oklahoma City Thunder	68	14	.829	–	36‍–‍6	32‍–‍8	12‍–‍4	82
x – Denver Nuggets	50	32	.610	18.0	26‍–‍15	24‍–‍17	8‍–‍8	82
x – Minnesota Timberwolves	49	33	.598	19.0	25‍–‍16	24‍–‍17	11‍–‍5	82
Portland Trail Blazers	36	46	.439	32.0	22‍–‍19	14‍–‍27	6‍–‍10	82
Utah Jazz	17	65	.207	51.0	10‍–‍31	7‍–‍34	3‍–‍13	82

=== Conference ===
Western Conference
#	Team	W	L	PCT	GB	GP
1	z – Oklahoma City Thunder *	68	14	.829	–	82
2	y – Houston Rockets *	52	30	.634	16.0	82
3	y – Los Angeles Lakers *	50	32	.610	18.0	82
4	x – Denver Nuggets	50	32	.610	18.0	82
5	x – Los Angeles Clippers	50	32	.610	18.0	82
6	x – Minnesota Timberwolves	49	33	.598	19.0	82
7	x – Golden State Warriors	48	34	.585	20.0	82
8	x – Memphis Grizzlies	48	34	.585	20.0	82
9	pi – Sacramento Kings	40	42	.488	28.0	82
10	pi – Dallas Mavericks	39	43	.476	29.0	82
11	Phoenix Suns	36	46	.439	32.0	82
12	Portland Trail Blazers	36	46	.439	32.0	82
13	San Antonio Spurs	34	48	.415	34.0	82
14	New Orleans Pelicans	21	61	.256	47.0	82
15	Utah Jazz	17	65	.207	51.0	82

== Game log ==
=== Preseason ===
2024 preseason game log
Total: 3–1 (Home: 2–0; Road: 1–1)
Preseason: 3–1 (home: 2–0; road: 1–1)

Game	Date	Team	Score	High points	High rebounds	High assists	Location Attendance	Record
1	October 11	@ L.A. Clippers	L 99–101	Toumani Camara (19)	Toumani Camara (9)	Dalano Banton (5)	Climate Pledge Arena; 18,300	0–1
2	October 13	@ Sacramento	W 105–85	Scoot Henderson (17)	Donovan Clingan (10)	Scoot Henderson (7)	Golden 1 Center; 14,788	1–1
3	October 16	Ratiopharm Ulm	W 111–100	Scoot Henderson (23)	Donovan Clingan (11)	Scoot Henderson (6)	Moda Center; 11,627	2–1
4	October 18	Utah	W 124–86	Rayan Rupert (20)	Donovan Clingan (20)	Avdija, Grant (7)	Moda Center; 15,806	3–1

2024–25 preseason schedule

=== Regular season ===
2024–25 game log
Total: 36–46 (Home: 22–19; Road: 14–27)
October: 2–3 (home: 1–2; road: 1–1)

Game	Date	Team	Score	High points	High rebounds	High assists	Location Attendance	Record
1	October 23	Golden State	L 104–140	Scoot Henderson (22)	Deandre Ayton (11)	Camara, Henderson (4)	Moda Center; 19,480	0–1
2	October 25	New Orleans	L 103–105	Jerami Grant (34)	Deandre Ayton (15)	Anfernee Simons (7)	Moda Center; 16,190	0–2
3	October 27	New Orleans	W 125–103	Jerami Grant (28)	Deandre Ayton (12)	Scoot Henderson (7)	Moda Center; 16,138	1–2
4	October 28	@ Sacramento	L 98–111	Deandre Ayton (20)	Deandre Ayton (11)	Scoot Henderson (5)	Golden 1 Center; 16,426	1–3
5	October 30	@ L.A. Clippers	W 106–105	Anfernee Simons (25)	Deandre Ayton (12)	Henderson, Simons (6)	Intuit Dome; 16,727	2–3

November: 6–9 (home: 4–2; road: 2–7)

Game	Date	Team	Score	High points	High rebounds	High assists	Location Attendance	Record
6	November 1	Oklahoma City	L 114–137	Jerami Grant (17)	Donovan Clingan (7)	Anfernee Simons (6)	Moda Center; 17,815	2–4
7	November 2	@ Phoenix	L 97–103	Grant, Simons (20)	Deandre Ayton (13)	Anfernee Simons (6)	Footprint Center; 17,071	2–5
8	November 4	@ New Orleans	W 118–100	Anfernee Simons (24)	Deandre Ayton (13)	Scoot Henderson (5)	Smoothie King Center; 14,932	3–5
9	November 7	@ San Antonio	L 105–118	Ayton, Grant (21)	Deandre Ayton (10)	Anfernee Simons (7)	Frost Bank Center; 17,120	3–6
10	November 8	@ Minnesota	L 102–127	Scoot Henderson (16)	Deandre Ayton (6)	Scoot Henderson (3)	Target Center; 18,978	3–7
11	November 10	Memphis	L 89–134	Jerami Grant (20)	Deandre Ayton (8)	Scoot Henderson (8)	Moda Center; 18,477	3–8
12	November 12	Minnesota	W 122–108	Jerami Grant (21)	Robert Williams III (9)	Jerami Grant (8)	Moda Center; 16,880	4–8
13	November 13	Minnesota	W 106–98	Shaedon Sharpe (33)	Donovan Clingan (12)	Banton, Henderson (5)	Moda Center; 17,353	5–8
14	November 17	Atlanta	W 114–107	Shaedon Sharpe (32)	Avdija, Clingan, Williams III (8)	Scoot Henderson (10)	Moda Center; 17,384	6–8
15	November 20	@ Oklahoma City	L 99–109	Shaedon Sharpe (21)	Camara, Clingan (9)	Scoot Henderson (8)	Paycom Center; 17,752	6–9
16	November 22	@ Houston	L 88–116	Avdija, Sharpe (13)	Donovan Clingan (7)	Jerami Grant (5)	Toyota Center; 15,546	6–10
17	November 23	@ Houston	W 104–98	Anfernee Simons (25)	Donovan Clingan (19)	Dalano Banton (5)	Toyota Center; 16,102	7–10
18	November 25	@ Memphis	L 98–123	Deni Avdija (17)	Avdija, Camara (8)	Deni Avdija (6)	FedExForum; 15,796	7–11
19	November 27	@ Indiana	L 114–121	Anfernee Simons (30)	Deandre Ayton (12)	Scoot Henderson (9)	Gainbridge Fieldhouse; 17,274	7–12
20	November 29	Sacramento	W 115–106	Deandre Ayton (26)	Avdija, Ayton (9)	Anfernee Simons (9)	Moda Center; 17,565	8–12

December: 3–9 (home: 3–4; road: 0–5)

Game	Date	Team	Score	High points	High rebounds	High assists	Location Attendance	Record
21	December 1	Dallas	L 131–137	Anfernee Simons (27)	Ayton, Camara (7)	Jerami Grant (6)	Moda Center; 16,205	8–13
22	December 3	@ L.A. Clippers	L 105–127	Deandre Ayton (16)	Jabari Walker (5)	Anfernee Simons (6)	Intuit Dome; 15,583	8–14
23	December 6	Utah	L 99–141	Banton, Grant (19)	Avdija, Reath, Simons (5)	Anfernee Simons (5)	Moda Center; 16,446	8–15
24	December 8	@ L.A. Lakers	L 98–107	Shaedon Sharpe (19)	Deandre Ayton (19)	Anfernee Simons (4)	Crypto.com Arena; 18,997	8–16
25	December 13	San Antonio	L 116–118	Jerami Grant (32)	Donovan Clingan (7)	Anfernee Simons (7)	Moda Center; 17,025	8–17
26	December 15	@ Phoenix	L 109–116	Anfernee Simons (20)	Donovan Clingan (9)	Sharpe, Simons (5)	Footprint Center; 17,071	8–18
27	December 19	Denver	W 126–124	Anfernee Simons (28)	Deandre Ayton (13)	Anfernee Simons (10)	Moda Center; 16,753	9–18
28	December 21	@ San Antonio	L 94–114	Shaedon Sharpe (25)	Deandre Ayton (8)	Anfernee Simons (6)	Frost Bank Center; 18,354	9–19
29	December 23	@ Dallas	L 108–132	Deni Avdija (19)	Toumani Camara (12)	Anfernee Simons (5)	American Airlines Center; 20,225	9–20
30	December 26	Utah	W 122–120	Avdija, Sharpe (27)	Deandre Ayton (12)	Scoot Henderson (10)	Moda Center; 16,934	10–20
31	December 28	Dallas	W 126–122	Shaedon Sharpe (23)	Deandre Ayton (16)	Anfernee Simons (8)	Moda Center; 19,335	11–20
32	December 30	Philadelphia	L 103–125	Anfernee Simons (25)	Toumani Camara (10)	Scoot Henderson (7)	Moda Center; 16,721	11–21

January: 8–8 (home: 3–5; road: 5–3)

Game	Date	Team	Score	High points	High rebounds	High assists	Location Attendance	Record
33	January 2	@ L.A. Lakers	L 106–114	Anfernee Simons (23)	Deni Avdija (10)	Scoot Henderson (8)	Crypto.com Arena; 17,812	11–22
34	January 4	@ Milwaukee	W 105–102	Anfernee Simons (28)	Deni Avdija (14)	Anfernee Simons (8)	Fiserv Forum; 17,595	12–22
35	January 6	@ Detroit	L 115–118	Anfernee Simons (36)	Deandre Ayton (11)	Anfernee Simons (9)	Little Caesars Arena; 16,002	12–23
36	January 8	@ New Orleans	W 119–100	Deni Avdija (26)	Deandre Ayton (13)	Camara, Henderson, Simons (5)	Smoothie King Center; 16,425	13–23
37	January 9	@ Dallas	L 111–117	Sharpe, Simons (22)	Donovan Clingan (11)	Avdija, Henderson, Simons (4)	American Airlines Center; 19,241	13–24
38	January 11	Miami	L 98–119	Anfernee Simons (28)	Deni Avdija (12)	Avdija, Sharpe (5)	Moda Center; 17,505	13–25
39	January 14	Brooklyn	L 114–132	Scoot Henderson (39)	Donovan Clingan (14)	Scoot Henderson (6)	Moda Center; 16,127	13–26
40	January 16	L.A. Clippers	L 89–118	Dalano Banton (23)	Ayton, Williams III (7)	Scoot Henderson (6)	Moda Center; 16,374	13–27
41	January 18	Houston	L 103–125	Scoot Henderson (21)	Shaedon Sharpe (8)	Scoot Henderson (11)	Moda Center; 17,077	13–28
42	January 19	Chicago	W 113–102	Scoot Henderson (25)	Deandre Ayton (13)	Scoot Henderson (8)	Moda Center; 16,976	14–28
43	January 21	@ Miami	W 116–107	Anfernee Simons (24)	Deandre Ayton (15)	Scoot Henderson (8)	Kaseya Center; 19,600	15–28
44	January 23	@ Orlando	W 101–79	Anfernee Simons (21)	Robert Williams III (12)	Deni Avdija (5)	Kia Center; 19,422	16–28
45	January 24	@ Charlotte	W 102–97	Anfernee Simons (27)	Donovan Clingan (13)	Avdija, Clingan, Henderson (4)	Spectrum Center; 16,228	17–28
46	January 26	Oklahoma City	L 108–118	Deni Avdija (28)	Robert Williams III (10)	Deni Avdija (8)	Moda Center; 17,619	17–29
47	January 28	Milwaukee	W 125–112	Deni Avdija (30)	Deandre Ayton (14)	Anfernee Simons (7)	Moda Center; 17,030	18–29
48	January 30	Orlando	W 119–90	Henderson, Sharpe (23)	Deandre Ayton (8)	Scoot Henderson (7)	Moda Center; 16,217	19–29

February: 8–4 (home: 5–1; road: 3–3)

Game	Date	Team	Score	High points	High rebounds	High assists	Location Attendance	Record
49	February 1	Phoenix	W 127–108	Deandre Ayton (24)	Toumani Camara (10)	Scoot Henderson (9)	Moda Center; 17,421	20–29
50	February 3	Phoenix	W 121–119 (OT)	Deandre Ayton (25)	Deandre Ayton (20)	Anfernee Simons (10)	Moda Center; 16,205	21–29
51	February 4	Indiana	W 112–89	Anfernee Simons (22)	Robert Williams III (11)	Anfernee Simons (7)	Moda Center; 16,005	22–29
52	February 6	Sacramento	W 108–102	Anfernee Simons (30)	Toumani Camara (14)	Scoot Henderson (8)	Moda Center; 16,953	23–29
53	February 8	@ Minnesota	L 98–114	Anfernee Simons (21)	Deandre Ayton (14)	Anfernee Simons (5)	Target Center; 18,978	23–30
54	February 10	@ Denver	L 117–146	Dalano Banton (22)	Donovan Clingan (7)	Deni Avdija (8)	Ball Arena; 19,535	23–31
55	February 12	@ Denver	L 121–132	Anfernee Simons (26)	Donovan Clingan (20)	Shaedon Sharpe (7)	Ball Arena; 19,901	23–32
All-Star Game
56	February 20	L.A. Lakers	L 102–110	Deni Avdija (28)	Toumani Camara (7)	Anfernee Simons (7)	Moda Center; 19,399	23–33
57	February 22	Charlotte	W 141–88	Anfernee Simons (25)	Jabari Walker (14)	Toumani Camara (6)	Moda Center; 18,501	24–33
58	February 24	@ Utah	W 114–112	Anfernee Simons (28)	Deni Avdija (14)	Henderson, Simons (6)	Delta Center; 18,175	25–33
59	February 26	@ Washington	W 129–121	Shaedon Sharpe (36)	Clingan, Sharpe (8)	Sharpe, Simons (5)	Capital One Arena; 12,943	26–33
60	February 28	@ Brooklyn	W 121–102	Shaedon Sharpe (25)	Dalano Banton (8)	Scoot Henderson (9)	Barclays Center; 18,018	27–33

March: 5–10 (home: 4–4; road: 1–6)

Game	Date	Team	Score	High points	High rebounds	High assists	Location Attendance	Record
61	March 2	@ Cleveland	L 129–133 (OT)	Deni Avdija (30)	Deni Avdija (12)	Deni Avdija (10)	Rocket Arena; 19,432	27–34
62	March 3	@ Philadelphia	W 119–102	Anfernee Simons (34)	Donovan Clingan (13)	Scoot Henderson (6)	Wells Fargo Center; 19,776	28–34
63	March 5	@ Boston	L 118–128	Anfernee Simons (30)	Donovan Clingan (7)	Anfernee Simons (6)	TD Garden; 19,156	28–35
64	March 7	@ Oklahoma City	L 89–107	Scoot Henderson (22)	Donovan Clingan (12)	Anfernee Simons (5)	Paycom Center; 17,911	28–36
65	March 9	Detroit	L 112–119	Anfernee Simons (34)	Clingan, Walker (9)	Toumani Camara (5)	Moda Center; 19,661	28–37
66	March 10	@ Golden State	L 120–130	Deni Avdija (34)	Deni Avdija (16)	Shaedon Sharpe (8)	Chase Center; 18,064	28–38
67	March 12	New York	L 113–114 (OT)	Scoot Henderson (30)	Deni Avdija (15)	Avdija, Simons (5)	Moda Center; 17,510	28–39
68	March 16	Toronto	W 105–102	Anfernee Simons (22)	Donovan Clingan (14)	Deni Avdija (6)	Moda Center; 18,154	29–39
69	March 17	Washington	W 112–97	Anfernee Simons (30)	Donovan Clingan (13)	Dalano Banton (5)	Moda Center; 17,919	30–39
70	March 19	Memphis	W 115–99	Deni Avdija (31)	Deni Avdija (16)	Deni Avdija (8)	Moda Center; 18,491	31–39
71	March 21	Denver	W 128–109	Deni Avdija (36)	Deni Avdija (8)	Deni Avdija (7)	Moda Center; 17,410	32–39
72	March 23	Boston	L 116–129	Shaedon Sharpe (23)	Deni Avdija (11)	Scoot Henderson (6)	Moda Center; 18,181	32–40
73	March 25	Cleveland	L 111–122	Clingan, Sharpe, Henderson (18)	Donovan Clingan (12)	Anfernee Simons (8)	Moda Center; 19,335	32–41
74	March 27	@ Sacramento	L 107–128	Deni Avdija (24)	Deni Avdija (9)	Scoot Henderson (6)	Golden 1 Center; 16,671	32–42
75	March 30	@ New York	L 93–110	Deni Avdija (33)	Donovan Clingan (10)	Avdija, Banton, Camara, Simons (4)	Madison Square Garden; 19,812	32–43

April: 4–3 (home: 2–1; road: 2–2)

Game	Date	Team	Score	High points	High rebounds	High assists	Location Attendance	Record
76	April 1	@ Atlanta	W 127–113	Shaedon Sharpe (33)	Deni Avdija (15)	Deni Avdija (10)	State Farm Arena; 17,124	33–43
77	April 3	@ Toronto	W 112–103	Shaedon Sharpe (36)	Deni Avdija (15)	Deni Avdija (6)	Scotiabank Arena; 18,548	34–43
78	April 4	@ Chicago	L 113–118	Deni Avdija (37)	Donovan Clingan (18)	Avdija, Sharpe (5)	United Center; 21,572	34–44
79	April 6	San Antonio	W 120–109	Toumani Camara (23)	Camara, Sharpe (10)	Banton, Sharpe (6)	Moda Center; 17,928	35–44
80	April 9	@ Utah	L 126–133 (OT)	Shaedon Sharpe (37)	Donovan Clingan (9)	Matisse Thybulle (6)	Delta Center; 18,175	35–45
81	April 11	Golden State	L 86–103	Jabari Walker (19)	Donovan Clingan (15)	Dalano Banton (6)	Moda Center; 19,335	35–46
82	April 13	L.A. Lakers	W 109–81	Dalano Banton (23)	Donovan Clingan (12)	Dalano Banton (7)	Moda Center; 19,335	36–46

2024–25 season schedule

=== NBA Cup ===
The groups were revealed during the tournament announcement on July 12, 2024.

==== West Group A ====
Pos	Team	Pld	W	L	PF	PA	PD	Qualification
1	Houston Rockets	4	3	1	454	414	+40	Advance to knockout stage
2	Los Angeles Clippers	4	2	2	427	411	+16	
3	Minnesota Timberwolves	4	2	2	418	431	−13	
4	Portland Trail Blazers	4	2	2	430	457	−27	
5	Sacramento Kings	4	1	3	429	445	−16	

Source: NBA
Rules for classification: Tiebreakers

== Player statistics ==
Legend
GP	Games played	GS	Games started	MPG	Minutes per game
FG%	Field-goal percentage	3P%	3-point field-goal percentage	FT%	Free-throw percentage
RPG	Rebounds per game	APG	Assists per game	SPG	Steals per game
BPG	Blocks per game	PPG	Points per game

=== Regular season ===
Portland Trail Blazers statistics
Player	GP	GS	MPG	FG%	3P%	FT%	RPG	APG	SPG	BPG	PPG
Deni Avdija	72	54	30.0	.476	.365	.780	7.3	3.9	1.0	.5	16.9
Deandre Ayton	40	40	30.2	.566	.188	.667	10.2	1.6	.8	1.0	14.4
Dalano Banton	67	7	16.7	.391	.324	.728	2.0	2.4	.6	.5	8.3
Toumani Camara	78	78	32.7	.458	.375	.722	5.8	2.2	1.5	.6	11.3
Sidy Cissoko^{†}	5	0	12.0	.333	.000	.667	2.2	1.8	.2	.2	2.0
Donovan Clingan	67	37	19.8	.539	.286	.596	7.9	1.1	.5	1.6	6.5
Jerami Grant	47	47	32.4	.373	.365	.849	3.5	2.1	.9	1.0	14.4
Scoot Henderson	66	10	26.7	.419	.354	.767	3.0	5.1	1.0	.2	12.7
Bryce McGowens	13	0	2.5	.286	.000	.833	.2	.2	.1	.0	1.0
Justin Minaya	19	0	5.3	.381	.200	.000	.5	.4	.3	.1	.9
Taze Moore	2	0	10.0	.200	.250	.500	4.0	.5	1.0	.0	3.0
Kris Murray	69	6	15.1	.419	.225	.456	2.6	1.0	.5	.2	4.2
Duop Reath	46	0	10.2	.422	.321	.909	2.0	.6	.3	.3	4.2
Rayan Rupert	52	0	8.8	.408	.271	.767	1.3	.5	.3	.1	3.0
Shaedon Sharpe	72	52	31.3	.452	.311	.785	4.5	2.8	.9	.2	18.5
Anfernee Simons	70	70	32.7	.426	.363	.902	2.7	4.8	.9	.1	19.3
Matisse Thybulle	15	5	20.8	.477	.438	.467	3.5	1.9	2.2	.6	7.5
Jabari Walker	60	1	12.5	.515	.389	.690	3.5	.6	.6	.1	5.2
Robert Williams III	20	3	17.6	.641	.333	.882	5.9	1.1	.7	1.7	5.8

- ^{†} Denotes player spent time with another team in the season. Stats reflect time with the Trail Blazers only.

== Transactions ==
=== Trades ===
June 27, 2024	To Portland Trail Blazers Draft rights to Oso Ighodaro (No. 40)	To Oklahoma City Thunder Draft rights to Quinten Post (No. 52); Cash considerations
June 27, 2024	To Portland Trail Blazers 2027 second-round pick 2029 second-round pick 2030 second-round pick	To New York Knicks Draft rights to Tyler Kolek (No. 34)
July 6, 2024	To Portland Trail Blazers Deni Avdija	To Washington Wizards Malcolm Brogdon; Draft rights to Bub Carrington (No. 14); 2029 first-round pick 2028 second-round pick 2030 second-round pick

=== Free agency ===
==== Re-signed ====
Date	Player	Ref.
July 1	Justin Minaya	

==== Additions ====
Player	Signed	Former Team	Ref.
Bryce McGowens	Two-way contract	Charlotte Hornets	
