= Toumani Camara =

Belgian basketball player (born 2000)

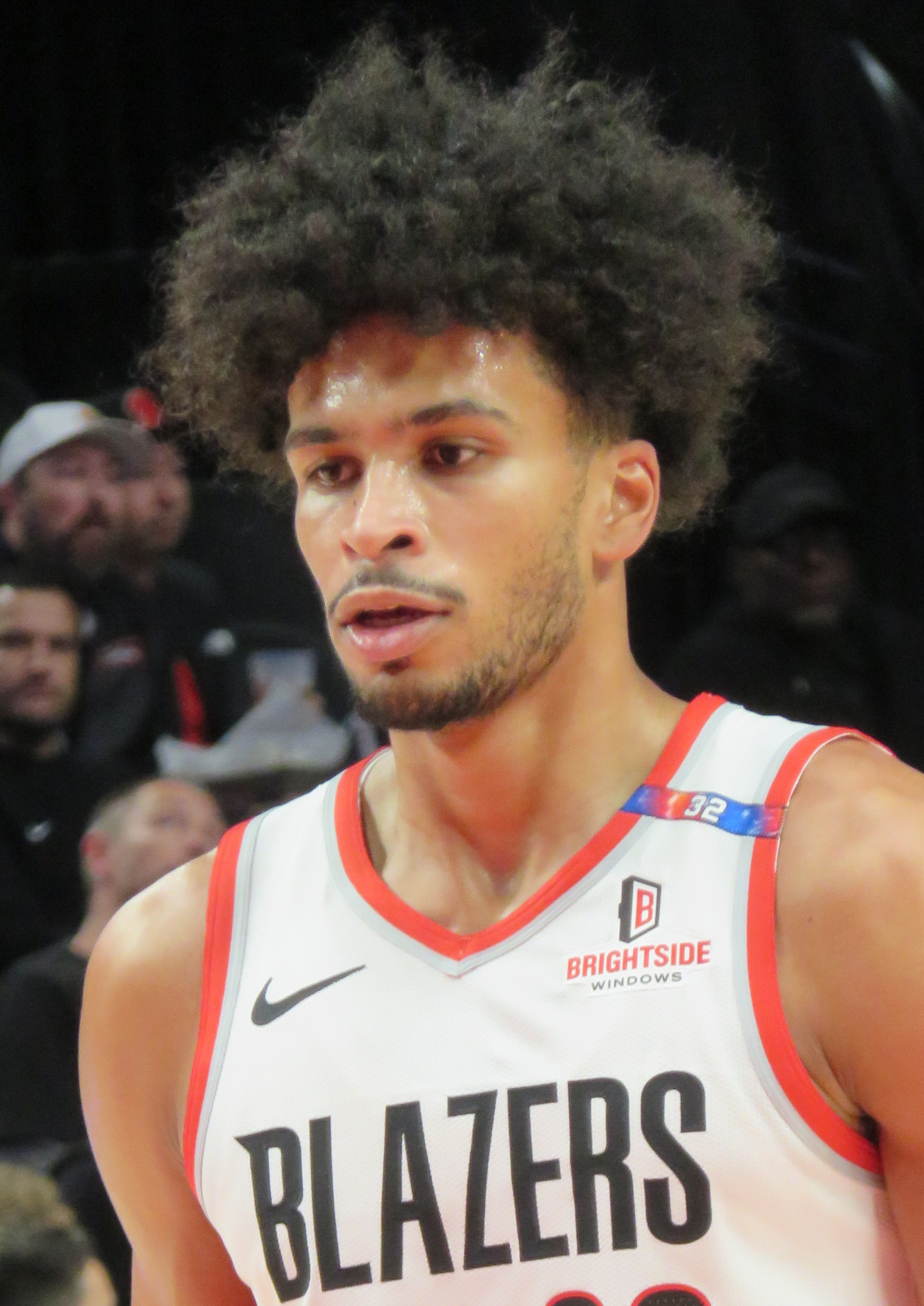
- Camara with the Portland Trail Blazers in 2024

No. 33 – Portland Trail Blazers
- Position: Power forward / small forward
- League: NBA

Personal information
- Born: 8 May 2000 (age 26) Brussels, Belgium
- Listed height: 6 ft 7 in (2.01 m)
- Listed weight: 230 lb (104 kg)

Career information
- High school: Chaminade–Madonna Prep (Hollywood, Florida)
- College: Georgia (2019–2021); Dayton (2021–2023)
- NBA draft: 2023: 2nd round, 52nd overall pick
- Drafted by: Phoenix Suns
- Playing career: 2023–present

Career history
- 2023–present: Portland Trail Blazers

Career highlights
- NBA All-Defensive Second Team (2025); First-team All-Atlantic 10 (2023); Third-team All-Atlantic 10 (2022); Atlantic 10 All-Defensive team (2023)
- Stats at NBA.com
- Stats at Basketball Reference

Toumani Camara (/tuːˈmɑːni kəˈmɑːrə/ too-MAH-nee kə-MAR-ə; born 8 May 2000) is a Belgian professional basketball player for the Portland Trail Blazers of the National Basketball Association (NBA). Raised in Belgium, he moved to the United States to attend Chaminade–Madonna College Preparatory School in Hollywood, Florida. Camara started his college basketball career with the Georgia Bulldogs and then transferred to the Dayton Flyers after his sophomore season. He was selected in the 2023 NBA draft by the Phoenix Suns and traded to the Trail Blazers before the start of his rookie season.

== Early life ==
Camara was raised in Brussels, Belgium. His mother, Anne Le Docte, is of Belgian and Haitian origin while his father is from Mali. Camara and his older brother were raised solely by Le Docte since he was five years old. He had a sister who died from a lung ailment when she was three months old. Camara has four butterflies tattooed on his right leg to pay tribute to his family: his mother, his brother, his sister and himself.

Camara first started playing basketball after being influenced by his brother. A local basketball court was occupied by soccer players throughout the day and Camara would have to wait until nighttime to play. His first exposure to American basketball was the NCAA Division I men's basketball tournament which was broadcast on Belgian television. Camara stayed awake into early mornings when he found a website that broadcast live NBA games and became a fan of Dwyane Wade while he watched him win a championship with the Miami Heat.

Camara developed into a promising player and played for the Belgium national team that competed in the 2016 FIBA U16 European Championship Division B. His Belgian coach had a friend who coached in Weston, Florida, and agreed to help Camara find a school in the United States. Camara moved to the United States at the age of 16 to attend Chaminade-Madonna College Preparatory School in Hollywood, Florida.

== High school career ==
Camara played at Chaminade-Madonna College Preparatory School where he averaged a double-double in his junior and senior seasons. He was recruited by more than 30 NCAA Division I schools. Camara toured the University of Dayton and Kansas State University but committed to the University of Georgia to play for the Bulldogs on 1 October 2018.

== College career ==
Camara averaged 6.6 points and 4.3 rebounds per game during his freshman season with the Bulldogs. During his freshman season, he was teammates with future #1 pick of the 2020 NBA draft, Anthony Edwards. He was mentioned as a possible NBA prospect before the start of his sophomore season but his stock fell. Camara finished his sophomore season with averages of 12.8 points and a team-best 7.7 rebounds per game. On 1 April 2021, Camara announced that he was entering the transfer portal; he stated that he felt like he would be able to develop more while playing for a different team.

On 8 April 2021, Camara committed to play for Dayton Flyers. He averaged 10.9 points and 6.9 rebounds during the 2021–22 season, earning him a nomination to the All-Atlantic 10 Conference third team. Camara declared for the 2022 NBA draft but withdrew after testing the process. He was appointed as the Flyers' team captain for the 2022–23 season and was the only fourth-year player on the roster. Camara averaged 13.9 points and 8.6 rebounds per game. He was selected to the All-Atlantic 10 first team and the all-defensive team.

On 25 April 2023, Camara announced that he had declared for the 2023 NBA draft to forgo his final season of collegiate eligibility. He was invited to participate at the NBA Draft Combine.

== Professional career ==
=== Portland Trail Blazers (2023–present) ===
Camara was drafted by the Phoenix Suns as the 52nd pick of the 2023 NBA draft. Camara signed a four-year rookie scaled contract on 3 July 2023.

==== 2023–24 season ====
On 27 September 2023, Camara, alongside Jrue Holiday, Deandre Ayton and a 2029 first-round draft pick, was traded to the Portland Trail Blazers as part of a three-team deal that sent Damian Lillard to the Milwaukee Bucks and Grayson Allen, Jusuf Nurkić, Nassir Little and Keon Johnson to the Phoenix Suns. He made his Blazers debut on 25 October in a game against the Los Angeles Clippers where he recorded seven points, one assist and two rebounds. Camara suffered a fractured left rib and a small laceration in his kidney at the end of March 2024 to end his rookie season early. He averaged 7.5 points and 4.9 rebounds per game.

==== 2024–25 season ====
On 30 September 2024, Camara was cleared for training camp.

From 19 January to 6 February 2025, the Trail Blazers had won 10 of their last 11 games (the team improved to 23–29 after starting the season 13–28). Camara had been a huge part of the turnaround with his defensive intensity and improved second-year shooting. He averaged 11.8 PPG, 7.9 RPG, and 2.1 APG on 54.9% shooting and 46.9% from three-point range (and an average +/- of +13.9 per game) during the run. For his defensive play in February, he was named Western Conference Defensive Player of the Month. Camara started all 78 games he played in for Portland during the 2024–25 NBA season, averaging 11.3 points, 5.8 rebounds, and 2.2 assists.

At season's end, Camara became the first Trail Blazer since Theo Ratliff in 2004 to earn NBA All-Defensive Team honors when he was named to the All Defensive Second Team.

==== 2025–26 season ====
On October 19, 2025, Camara and the Trail Blazers agreed to a four-year, $82 million contract extension. On March 23, 2026, Camara hit a career–high nine three–point field goals on 11 attempts in a win against the Brooklyn Nets. Camara started all 82 contests for Portland during the 2025–26 season, recording averages of 13.4 points, 5.1 rebounds, and 2.5 assists.

== National team career ==
Camara was selected to represent Belgium on the youth level, at the 2016 FIBA U16 European Championship Division B. During the tournament with the Belgium U16 national team, he finished with averages of 2.4 points and 2.9 rebounds per game.

== Career statistics ==
Legend
GP	Games played	GS	Games started	MPG	Minutes per game
FG%	Field goal percentage	3P%	3-point field goal percentage	FT%	Free throw percentage
RPG	Rebounds per game	APG	Assists per game	SPG	Steals per game
BPG	Blocks per game	PPG	Points per game	**Bold**	Career high
*	Led the league

=== NBA ===
==== Regular season ====
Year	Team	GP	GS	MPG	FG%	3P%	FT%	RPG	APG	SPG	BPG	PPG
2023–24	Portland	70	49	24.8	.450	.337	**.758**	4.9	1.2	.9	.5	7.5
2024–25	Portland	78	78	32.7	**.458**	**.375**	.722	**5.8**	2.2	**1.5**	**.6**	11.3
2025–26	Portland	**82***	**82***	**33.3**	.440	.370	.708	5.1	**2.5**	1.1	.4	**13.4**
Career		230	209	30.5	.448	.367	.727	5.3	2.0	1.2	.5	10.9

==== Playoffs ====
Year	Team	GP	GS	MPG	FG%	3P%	FT%	RPG	APG	SPG	BPG	PPG
2026	Portland	5	5	33.0	.289	.259	1.000	5.5	1.2	1.4	.6	7.0
Career		5	5	33.0	.289	.259	1.000	5.5	1.2	1.4	.6	7.0

=== College ===
Year	Team	GP	GS	MPG	FG%	3P%	FT%	RPG	APG	SPG	BPG	PPG
2019–20	Georgia	32	23	24.0	.494	.172	.625	4.3	.7	.6	.6	6.6
2020–21	Georgia	25	25	28.4	.486	.263	.621	7.7	1.6	**1.2**	**1.1**	12.8
2021–22	Dayton	**34**	**34**	27.2	.510	.338	.591	6.9	1.6	.6	.8	10.9
2022–23	Dayton	**34**	**34**	**30.0**	**.546**	**.363**	**.669**	**8.6**	1.2	**1.2**	.8	**13.9**
Career		125	116	27.4	.513	.307	.631	6.9	1.4	1.0	.6	11.0
