= Duop Reath =

Australian basketball player (born 1996)

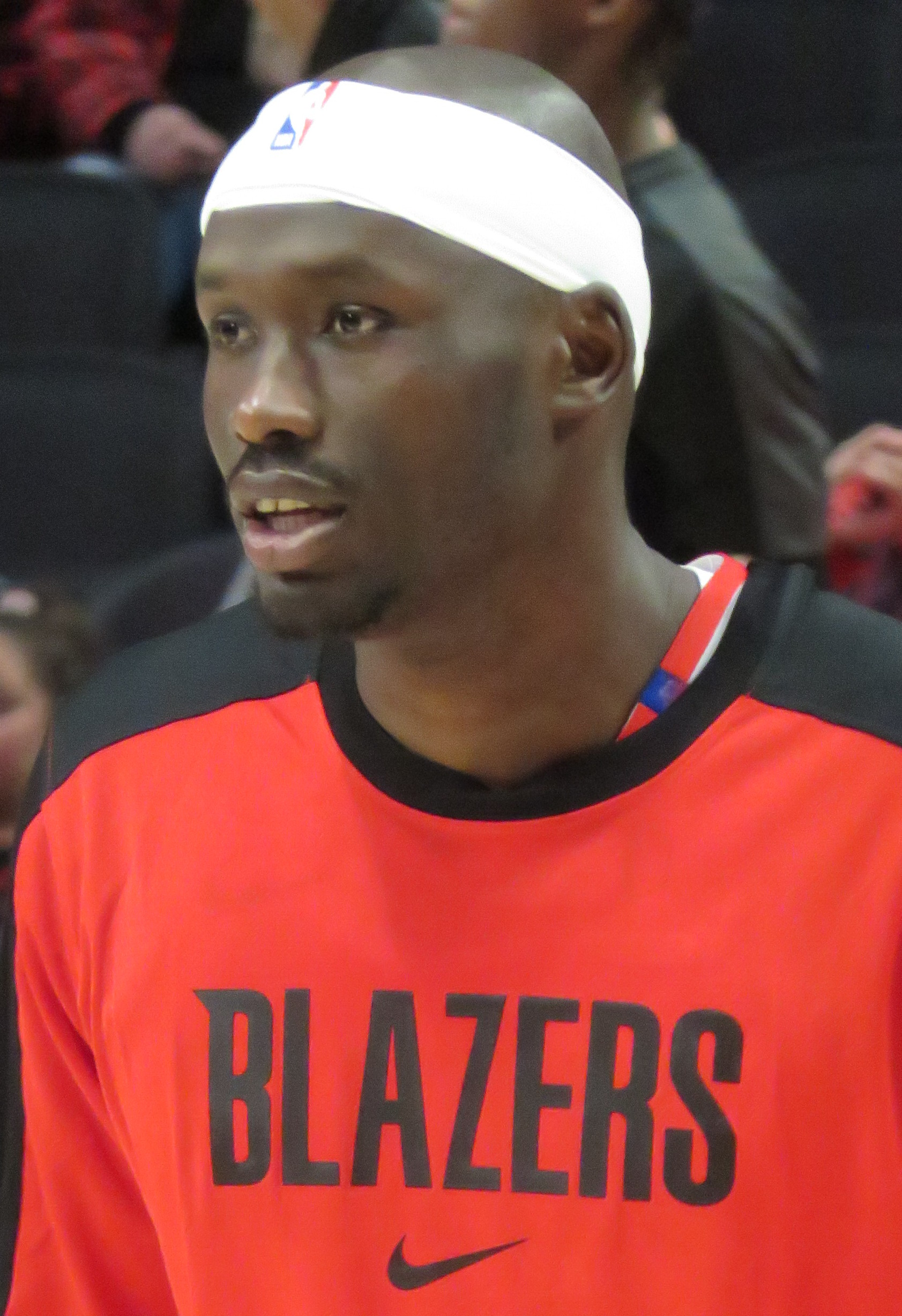
- Reath with the Portland Trail Blazers in 2024

No. 26 – Phoenix Suns
- Position: Center
- League: NBA

Personal information
- Born: 26 June 1996 (age 30) Waat, Sudan (now South Sudan)
- Listed height: 6 ft 10 in (2.08 m)
- Listed weight: 245 lb (111 kg)

Career information
- High school: Girrawheen Senior (Perth, Western Australia)
- College: Lee College (2014–2016); LSU (2016–2018)
- NBA draft: 2018: undrafted
- Playing career: 2014–present

Career history
- 2014: Kalamunda Eastern Suns
- 2018–2020: FMP
- 2020–2021: Crvena zvezda
- 2021–2022: Illawarra Hawks
- 2022–2023: Qingdao Eagles
- 2023: Al Riyadi Beirut
- 2023–2026: Portland Trail Blazers
- 2023; 2025: →Rip City Remix
- 2026–present: Phoenix Suns
- 2026–present: →Valley Suns

Career highlights
- WASL West Asia League champion (2023); Lebanese Basketball League champion (2023); Adriatic League champion (2021); Serbian League champion (2021)
- Stats at NBA.com
- Stats at Basketball Reference
Medals
Men's basketball
Representing Australia
Olympic Games
Bronze medal – third place	2020 Tokyo	Team

Duop Thomas Reath (/ˈduːɒp ˈriːθ/ DOO-op REETH; born 26 June 1996) is a South Sudanese-Australian professional basketball player for the Phoenix Suns of the National Basketball Association (NBA), on a two-way contract with the Valley Suns of the NBA G League. He played college basketball for the Lee College Runnin' Rebels and the LSU Tigers and was part of the Australian national team that won bronze at the 2020 Tokyo Olympics.

== Early life ==
Reath was born in Waat, Sudan, present day in Jonglei State of South Sudan. When he was aged nine, he moved to Brisbane, Australia, alongside his parents, Thomas Duop and Nyanen Juch, and six younger siblings. Reath then moved again to Perth and attended Girrawheen Senior High School. He first played soccer with ambitions of playing for the Socceroos until a growth spurt in year 10 led to him playing basketball. Reath played seven games for the Kalamunda Eastern Suns of the State Basketball League during the 2014 season.

== College career ==
Reath played the freshman and the sophomore season at Lee College in Baytown, Texas, from 2014 to 2016. In the 2014–15 season, he averaged 6.9 points and 5.4 rebounds per game. As a sophomore (2015–16), he averaged 14.6 points and 8.4 rebounds per game.

=== Junior season ===
In 2016, Reath joined the LSU Tigers of the Southeastern Conference (SEC). He appeared in 31 games, including 30 starts in the Tigers' 2016–17 season. He averaged 12.0 points, 6.7 rebounds and 0.8 assists per game during the season. He was the SEC Player of the Week in the first week. On 19 December 2016, he scored season-high 23 points against the Charleston. On 4 February 2017, he pulled down a career-high 16 rebounds against Texas A&M.

=== Senior season ===
Reath appeared in 33 games, including 28 starts in the Tigers' 2017–18 season. He averaged 12.6 points, 5.3 rebounds and 0.7 assists per game during the season. On 20 January 2018, he scored a career-high 31 points against Vanderbilt. He was named the SEC Player of the Week in the fifth week.

== Professional career ==
=== Serbian League (2018–2021) ===
After going undrafted in the 2018 NBA draft, Reath joined the Dallas Mavericks for the NBA Summer League.

On 1 August 2018, Reath signed a three-year contract with the Serbian team FMP. In July 2019, he joined the Brooklyn Nets for the 2019 NBA Summer League.

On 1 August 2020, Reath signed a contract with the Serbian team Crvena zvezda for the 2020–21 season.

=== Illawarra Hawks (2021–2022) ===
On 19 June 2021, Reath signed with the Illawarra Hawks of the National Basketball League for the 2021–22 season.

Reath joined the Phoenix Suns in the 2022 NBA Summer League.

=== Qingdao Eagles (2022–2023) ===
Reath signed with the Qingdao Eagles of the Chinese Basketball Association. Reath averaged 18.2 points, 7.8 rebounds, 1.2 steals and 2.0 blocks per game across 39 appearances.

=== Al Riyadi Beirut (2023) ===
Reath joined Al Riyadi Beirut of Lebanon in April 2023. He made his team debut on 19 April 2023 in the West Asia Super League (WASL), and scored 24 points in Al Riyadi's win over rivals Beirut Club in the division semi-finals. Reath helped Al Riyadi win the West Asia subdivision championship following a team-high 29 points in the decisive Game 2 of the finals against Shahrdari Gorgan.

=== Portland Trail Blazers / Rip City Remix (2023–2026) ===
On 30 June 2023, Reath joined the Portland Trail Blazers for the 2023 NBA Summer League and following the 2023 FIBA World Cup, he signed a one-year deal with the Trail Blazers on 2 October. However, he was waived on 21 October, prior to the start of the season, but was re-signed to the team three days later with a two-way contract. Reath made his NBA debut on 12 November against the Los Angeles Lakers, scoring 11 points with three 3-pointers made in a 116–110 loss. On 26 December, he had a career-high 25 points, along with nine rebounds, in a 130–113 win over the Sacramento Kings. On 16 February 2024, Reath signed a standard contract with the Trail Blazers.

On 2 February 2025, Reath was assigned to the Rip City Remix of the NBA G League. He made 46 appearances for Portland during the 2024–25 NBA season, posting averages of 4.2 points, 2.0 rebounds, and 0.6 assists.

In the 2025–26 NBA season, Reath appeared in 32 games with the Trail Blazers, averaging 2.9 points and 1.2 rebounds in 8.1 minutes of action. On 29 January 2026, he underwent season-ending foot surgery to repair a stress fracture.

On 1 February 2026, Reath was traded, along with a 2027 second-round pick and a 2030 second-round pick to the Atlanta Hawks in exchange for Vít Krejčí. On 5 February, the Hawks waived Reath.

=== Phoenix Suns (2026–present) ===
On 16 September 2026, Reath signed a one-year deal with the Phoenix Suns. This move would come after Mark Williams would injure his shoulder five days prior to the signing. On 19 October 2026, his contract was converted to a two-way contract.

== National team career ==
Reath was selected as a member of the Australian national team for the 2020 Summer Olympics in Tokyo, Japan. He re-joined the Boomers for the 2023 FIBA Basketball World Cup.

In July 2024, Reath was named in the Boomers' final squad for the Paris Olympics.

== Career statistics ==
Legend
GP	Games played	GS	Games started	MPG	Minutes per game
FG%	Field goal percentage	3P%	3-point field goal percentage	FT%	Free throw percentage
RPG	Rebounds per game	APG	Assists per game	SPG	Steals per game
BPG	Blocks per game	PPG	Points per game	**Bold**	Career high

=== NBA ===
Year	Team	GP	GS	MPG	FG%	3P%	FT%	RPG	APG	SPG	BPG	PPG
2023–24	Portland	**68**	**20**	**17.9**	**.461**	.359	.742	**3.7**	**1.0**	**.5**	**.6**	**9.1**
2024–25	Portland	46	0	10.2	.422	.321	**.909**	2.0	.6	.3	.3	4.2
2025–26	Portland	32	0	8.1	.446	**.418**	.833	1.2	.3	.2	.3	2.9
Career		146	20	13.3	.451	.357	.777	2.6	.7	.3	.4	6.2

=== College ===
Year	Team	GP	GS	MPG	FG%	3P%	FT%	RPG	APG	SPG	BPG	PPG
2016–17	LSU	31	**30**	**27.7**	.510	.314	.603	**6.2**	**.8**	.5	**1.5**	12.0
2017–18	LSU	**33**	28	24.2	**.544**	**.422**	**.629**	5.3	.7	.5	1.0	**12.5**
Career		64	58	25.9	.527	.375	.617	5.8	.7	.5	1.2	12.3

== See also ==
- List of foreign basketball players in Serbia
- List of NBA players born outside the United States
