= Anfernee Simons =

American basketball player (born 1999)

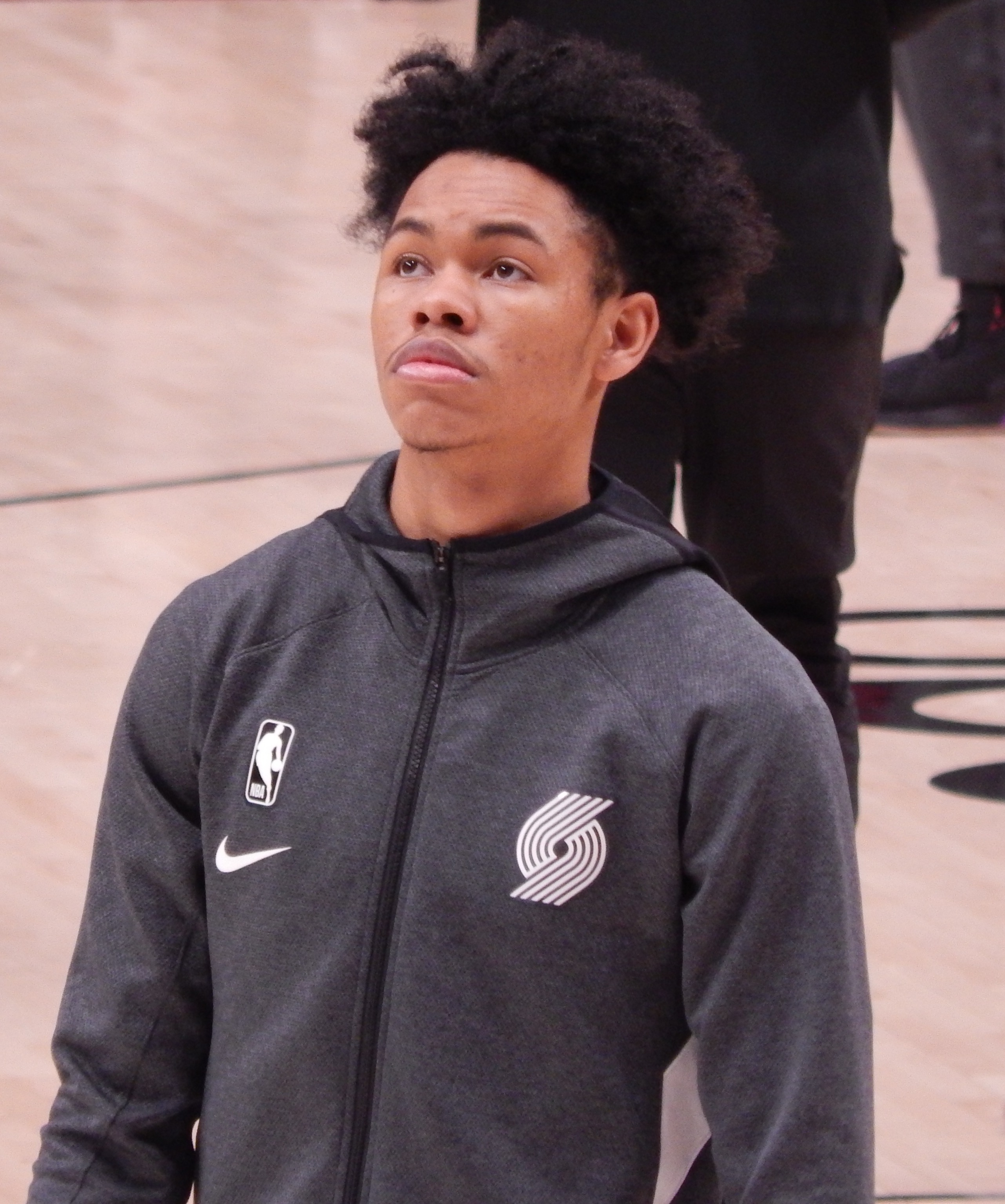
- Simons with the Portland Trail Blazers in 2019

No. 5 – Philadelphia 76ers
- Position: Shooting guard / point guard
- League: NBA

Personal information
- Born: June 8, 1999 (age 27) Longwood, Florida, U.S.
- Listed height: 6 ft 4 in (1.93 m)
- Listed weight: 200 lb (91 kg)

Career information
- High school: Edgewater (Orlando, Florida); IMG Academy (Bradenton, Florida)
- NBA draft: 2018: 1st round, 24th overall pick
- Drafted by: Portland Trail Blazers
- Playing career: 2018–present

Career history
- 2018–2025: Portland Trail Blazers
- 2019: →Agua Caliente Clippers
- 2025–2026: Boston Celtics
- 2026: Chicago Bulls
- 2026–present: Philadelphia 76ers

Career highlights
- NBA Slam Dunk Contest champion (2021)
- Stats at NBA.com
- Stats at Basketball Reference

Anfernee Tyrik Simons (/ˈænfərni/ AN-fər-nee; born June 8, 1999) is an American professional basketball player for the Philadelphia 76ers of the National Basketball Association (NBA). After high school, he played basketball during a postgraduate year at the IMG Academy in Bradenton, Florida, before being selected by the Portland Trail Blazers in the first round of the 2018 NBA draft with the 24th overall pick. Simons was traded to the Boston Celtics in 2025 and to the Chicago Bulls in 2026.

== Early life ==
Simons first attended Edgewater High School in Orlando, Florida, where he averaged 17.8 points, 4.6 assists, 2.4 rebounds, and 1 steal per game in 30 games as a sophomore. After growing up young for his grade level and playing with older students, Simons reclassified to enter college with the class of 2018, providing him an extra year to develop. During his junior year, Simons transferred to Montverde Academy in Montverde, but after being a bench player, returned to Edgewater. He graduated high school in 2017, averaging 23.8 points, 7.2 rebounds, 4.2 assists, 1.8 steals, and 0.5 blocks per game in 20 games played in his last year at Edgewater. Simons then attended the IMG Academy in Bradenton for a postgraduate year, although he had previously expressed interest in spending that year at the West Oaks Academy in Orlando instead. Simons averaged 22.4 points, 6.7 rebounds and 3.1 assists on IMG's postgraduate team. During the summer of 2017, he also played for the United States men's national under-19 basketball team.

Simons was rated as a five-star recruit and was ranked as the seventh-best player in the 2018 class by 247Sports.com. Originally, he planned to enter the University of Louisville, but due to the school's basketball sex scandal of 2015 and involvement in the 2017–18 NCAA Division I men's basketball corruption scandal, Simons decommitted from Louisville, saying that he was most interested in the University of South Carolina, North Carolina State University, the University of Tennessee, and the University of Florida. In January 2018, Simons then said that he was "most likely" going to bypass college and enter the 2018 NBA draft, albeit without hiring an agent. Two months later, he confirmed his decision, and later removed his name from the 2018 Nike Hoop Summit and Jordan Brand Classic. On March 20, 2018, ESPN ranked Simons as the 19th-best prospect in the draft. He was later named one of the 69 players invited to the 2018 NBA Draft Combine that year.

College recruiting (2018)
Name	Hometown	School	Height	Weight	Commit date
Anfernee Simons; SG	Altamonte, FL	IMG Academy (FL)	6 ft 3 in (1.91 m)	181 lb (82 kg)	Nov 12, 2016
Anfernee Simons; SG	Recruit ratings: Rivals: 247Sports: ESPN: (94)				
Overall recruit ranking: Rivals: 10 247Sports: 10 ESPN: 9
Note: In many cases, Scout, Rivals, 247Sports, On3, and ESPN may conflict in their listings of height and weight.; In these cases, the average was taken. ESPN grades are on a 100-point scale.; Sources: "Louisville 2018 Basketball Commitments". Rivals.; "2018 Louisville Cardinals Recruiting Class". ESPN.; "2018 Team Ranking". Rivals.

== Professional career ==
=== Portland Trail Blazers (2018–2025) ===
Simons was selected 24th overall by the Portland Trail Blazers in the 2018 NBA draft. He would be the third high school player since 2015 to be drafted in the NBA, behind Thon Maker and Satnam Singh Bhamara. On July 2, 2018, the Trail Blazers announced that they had signed Simons.

On January 21, 2019, the Blazers assigned Simons to the Agua Caliente Clippers for an NBA G League assignment.

On April 10, 2019, Simons had his first career start against the Sacramento Kings while the Trail Blazers rested Damian Lillard and CJ McCollum for the final game of the regular season. Simons put up career highs across the board with 37 points, six rebounds, and nine assists, becoming the first Trail Blazers rookie to score 30-plus points since Lillard.

In the championship round of the Slam Dunk Contest during halftime of the 2021 NBA All-Star Game, Simons attempted to kiss the rim, but failed and still completed the dunk. Despite his failed attempt, Simons was named the 2021 Slam Dunk Champion on a 3–2 decision.

On January 3, 2022, Simons scored a then career-high 43 points behind nine three-pointers, along with seven assists, in a 136–131 victory over the Atlanta Hawks. In a postgame interview, he dedicated the game to his grandfather who died of cancer the previous night. On March 28, Simons was ruled out for the remainder of the season with patellar tendinopathy in his left knee.

On July 6, 2022, Simons re-signed with the Trail Blazers on a four-year, $100 million contract. On October 21, Simons hit a game-winning floater in a 113–111 overtime victory over the Phoenix Suns. On December 3, Simons scored a career-high 45 points in a 116–111 win over the Utah Jazz. On February 3, 2023, Simons scored 33 points in a 124–116 comeback win over the Washington Wizards.

On October 25, 2023, Simons suffered a torn UCL in his right thumb against the Los Angeles Clippers, ruling him out for four to six weeks.

On December 19, 2024, Simons had a double-double and hit the game-winning buzzer-beater against the Denver Nuggets. Simons started 70 games for Portland during the 2024–25 NBA season, recording averages of 19.3 points, 2.7 rebounds, and 4.8 assists.

=== Boston Celtics (2025–2026) ===
On July 7, 2025, Simons was traded to the Boston Celtics in exchange for Jrue Holiday. On January 15, 2026, Simons recorded 39 points (including seven three-pointers), four rebounds, and four assists in a 119–114 victory over the Miami Heat. He performed primarily in a reserve role for Boston during the 2025–26 season, averaging 14.2 points, 2.4 rebounds, and 2.4 assists across 49 appearances for the team.

=== Chicago Bulls (2026) ===
On February 5, 2026, Simons and a 2026 second-round pick were traded to the Chicago Bulls in exchange for Nikola Vučević and a 2027 second-round pick. Simons made six appearances (five starts) for Chicago during the remainder of the season, averaging 15.2 points, 2.8 rebounds, and 3.0 assists.

=== Philadelphia 76ers (2026–present) ===
On July 6, 2026, Simons signed a two-year, $12.3 million contract with the Philadelphia 76ers. He made his debut for the team on October 20, recording 13 points and two rebounds in a 106–100 win over the New York Knicks.

== Career statistics ==
Legend
GP	Games played	GS	Games started	MPG	Minutes per game
FG%	Field goal percentage	3P%	3-point field goal percentage	FT%	Free throw percentage
RPG	Rebounds per game	APG	Assists per game	SPG	Steals per game
BPG	Blocks per game	PPG	Points per game	**Bold**	Career high

=== NBA ===
==== Regular season ====
Year	Team	GP	GS	MPG	FG%	3P%	FT%	RPG	APG	SPG	BPG	PPG
2018–19	Portland	20	1	7.0	.444	.345	.563	.7	.7	.1	.0	3.8
2019–20	Portland	**70**	4	20.7	.399	.332	.826	2.2	1.4	.4	.1	8.3
2020–21	Portland	64	0	17.3	.419	**.426**	.807	2.2	1.4	.3	.1	7.8
2021–22	Portland	57	30	29.5	.443	.405	.888	2.6	3.9	.5	.1	17.3
2022–23	Portland	62	**62**	**35.0**	**.447**	.377	.894	2.6	4.1	.7	.2	21.1
2023–24	Portland	46	46	34.4	.430	.385	.916	**3.6**	**5.5**	.5	.1	**22.6**
2024–25	Portland	70	70	32.7	.426	.363	.902	2.7	4.8	**.9**	.1	19.3
2025–26	Boston	49	0	24.5	.440	.395	.889	2.4	2.4	.6	.1	14.2
2025–26	Chicago	6	5	28.4	.438	.320	**1.000**	2.8	3.0	.0	**.3**	15.2
Career		444	218	26.6	.432	.381	.881	2.5	3.2	.5	.1	14.9

==== Playoffs ====
Year	Team	GP	GS	MPG	FG%	3P%	FT%	RPG	APG	SPG	BPG	PPG
2019	Portland	5	0	2.4	.000	.000	.800	.0	.0	.2	.0	.8
2020	Portland	4	0	**20.5**	.305	.429	**.833**	**2.8**	**2.5**	**1.5**	.0	**6.8**
2021	Portland	**6**	0	17.8	**.560**	**.611**	.000	2.7	.8	.3	**.2**	6.5
Career		15	0	13.4	.379	.500	.818	1.8	1.0	.6	.1	4.7

== Personal life ==
Simons was given the name Anfernee due to his parents, Charles and Tameka, being fans of the Orlando Magic and naming him after former player Anfernee "Penny" Hardaway. Hardaway coached Simons during a Team USA Basketball training camp.
