= Shaedon Sharpe =

Canadian basketball player (born 2003)

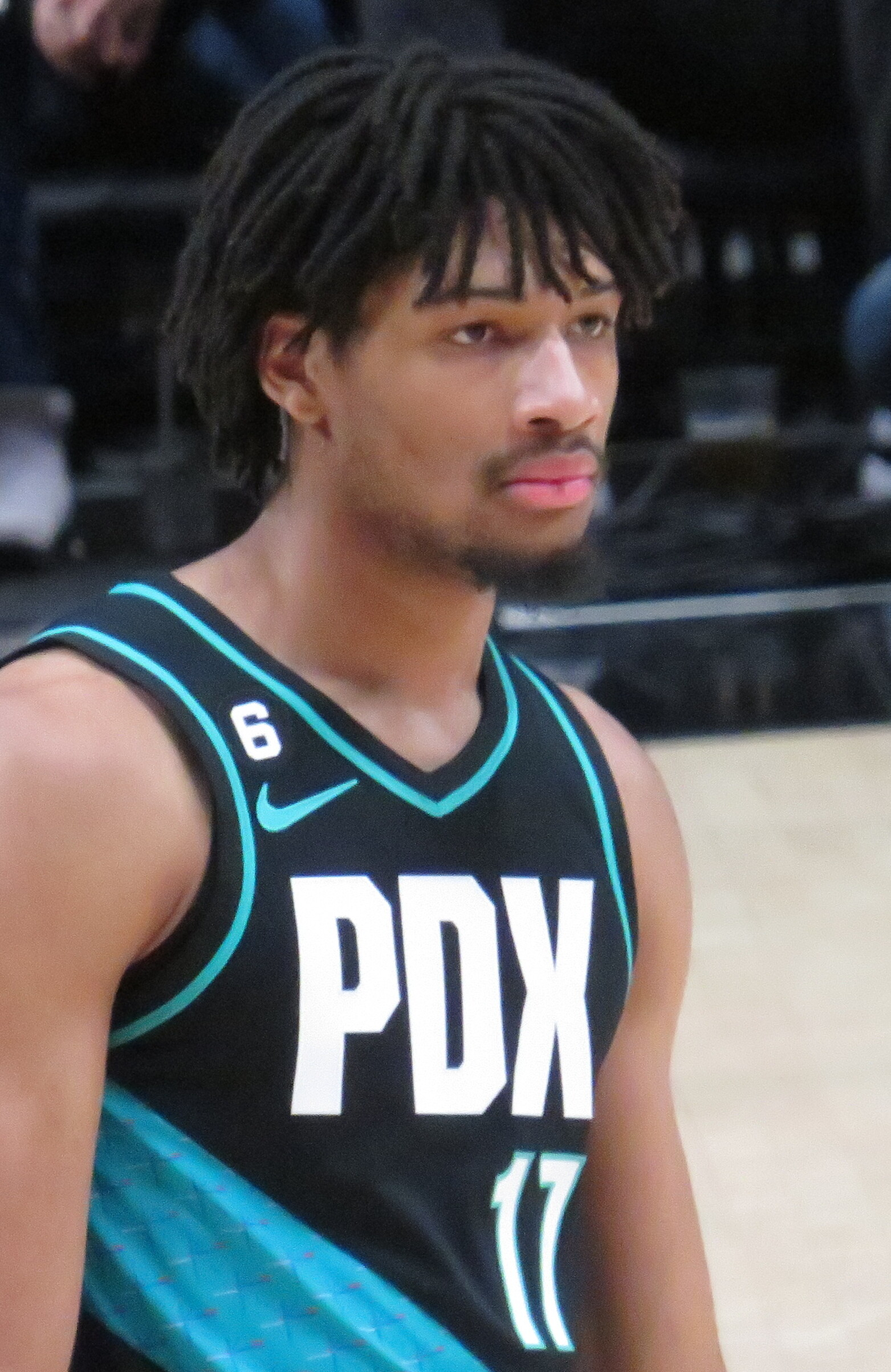
- Sharpe in 2022

No. 17 – Portland Trail Blazers
- Position: Shooting guard
- League: NBA

Personal information
- Born: May 30, 2003 (age 23) London, Ontario, Canada
- Listed height: 6 ft 5 in (1.96 m)
- Listed weight: 210 lb (95 kg)

Career information
- High school: H. B. Beal (London, Ontario); Sunrise Christian Academy (Bel Aire, Kansas); Dream City Christian (Glendale, Arizona)
- NBA draft: 2022: 1st round, 7th overall pick
- Drafted by: Portland Trail Blazers
- Playing career: 2022–present

Career history
- 2022–present: Portland Trail Blazers
- Stats at NBA.com
- Stats at Basketball Reference
Medals
Men's basketball
Representing Canada
FIBA Americas Under-16 Championship
Silver medal – second place	2019 Brazil	Team

Shaedon Sharpe (/ˈʃeɪdən/ SHAY-dən; born May 30, 2003) is a Canadian professional basketball player for the Portland Trail Blazers of the National Basketball Association (NBA). A consensus five-star recruit out of high school, Sharpe signed to play college basketball with the Kentucky Wildcats, but did not play a game before leaving for the NBA. He was selected seventh overall in the 2022 NBA draft.

== Early life ==
Sharpe played basketball for H. B. Beal Secondary School in his hometown of London, Ontario and led his team to an Ontario Federation of School Athletic Associations AAA appearance. He moved to Sunrise Christian Academy in Bel Aire, Kansas, where he had a limited production as a sophomore. For his junior season, Sharpe transferred to Dream City Christian School in Glendale, Arizona and assumed a leading role. He averaged 21.4 points and six rebounds per game in the Grind Session. He competed for UPLAY Canada on the Amateur Athletic Union circuit, where he was mentored by Dwayne Washington.

Sharpe was a consensus five-star recruit and was previously the consensus number one player in the 2022 class before reclassifying. Sharpe was unranked by major recruiting services early in his high school career and became one of the top players in his class in about one year, in part due to his success at the Nike Elite Youth Basketball League in 2021. On September 7, 2021, he committed to playing college basketball for Kentucky over offers from Arizona, Kansas, Oklahoma State and the NBA G League Ignite. He was the first number one recruit to commit to the program since Nerlens Noel in 2012.

College recruiting
Name	Hometown	School	Height	Weight	Commit date
Shaedon Sharpe; SG	London, ON	Dream City Christian (AZ)	6 ft 5 in (1.96 m)	215 lb (98 kg)	Sep 7, 2021
Shaedon Sharpe; SG	Recruit ratings: Rivals: 247Sports: ESPN: (97)				
Overall recruit ranking: Rivals: 1 247Sports: 1 ESPN: 1
Note: In many cases, Scout, Rivals, 247Sports, On3, and ESPN may conflict in their listings of height and weight.; In these cases, the average was taken. ESPN grades are on a 100-point scale.; Sources: "Kentucky 2021 Basketball Commitments". Rivals.; "2021 Kentucky Wildcats Recruiting Class". ESPN.; "2021 Team Ranking". Rivals.

== College career ==
Sharpe graduated early from high school with the intention of redshirting his first year at Kentucky and playing in the 2022–23 season. On February 7, 2022, head coach John Calipari announced that Sharpe would not play for the team in the 2021–22 season after speculation that he would play and enter the 2022 NBA draft, for which he was eligible. On April 21, Sharpe declared for the 2022 draft, forgoing his remaining college eligibility without playing a game.

== Professional career ==
=== Portland Trail Blazers (2022–present) ===
Sharpe was selected with the seventh overall pick in the 2022 NBA draft by the Portland Trail Blazers. He joined the 6th overall pick, Bennedict Mathurin, as the only Canadians drafted in the first round that year. On July 1, 2022, he signed his rookie-scale contract with the Trail Blazers. On July 8, in his NBA Summer League debut, Sharpe suffered a shoulder injury after under six minutes of play. An MRI later revealed a small labral tear in his left shoulder, and Sharpe was unable to play for the rest of the Summer League. On October 19, he made his NBA debut, scoring 12 points in a 115–108 win over the Sacramento Kings. On March 29, 2023, in a loss against the Kings, Sharpe recorded 30 points along with seven rebounds and seven assists, and joined LeBron James, Kevin Durant, and Luka Dončić as the only teenagers to ever achieve such numbers in a game.

On February 9, 2024, Sharpe underwent abdominal surgery. On April 9, the team announced that Sharpe would miss the remainder of the season.

On September 30, 2024, Sharpe was cleared for training camp after undergoing abdominal surgery. He made 72 appearances (52 starts) for Portland during the 2024–25 NBA season, averaging 18.5 points, 4.5 rebounds, and 2.8 assists.

On October 19, 2025, Sharpe and the Trail Blazers agreed to a four-year, $90 million contract extension. On February 24, 2026, Sharpe was ruled out for 4-to-6 weeks due to a stress reaction in his left fibula.

On August 24, 2026, it was announced that Sharpe would miss six months after suffering a torn meniscus in his knee.

== National team career ==
Sharpe represented Canada at the 2019 FIBA Under-16 Americas Championship in Brazil. He averaged 13 points, 3.7 rebounds and 2.3 assists, helping his team win the silver medal.

== Career statistics ==
Legend
GP	Games played	GS	Games started	MPG	Minutes per game
FG%	Field goal percentage	3P%	3-point field goal percentage	FT%	Free throw percentage
RPG	Rebounds per game	APG	Assists per game	SPG	Steals per game
BPG	Blocks per game	PPG	Points per game	**Bold**	Career high

=== NBA ===
==== Regular season ====
Year	Team	GP	GS	MPG	FG%	3P%	FT%	RPG	APG	SPG	BPG	PPG
2022–23	Portland	**80**	15	22.2	**.472**	**.360**	.714	3.0	1.2	.5	.3	9.9
2023–24	Portland	32	25	**33.1**	.406	.333	**.824**	**5.0**	**2.9**	.9	**.4**	15.9
2024–25	Portland	72	**52**	31.3	.452	.311	.785	4.5	2.8	.9	.2	18.5
2025–26	Portland	50	42	29.4	.452	.337	.787	4.3	2.6	**1.4**	.1	**20.8**
Career		234	134	28.0	.450	.332	.781	4.0	2.2	.8	.2	15.7

==== Playoffs ====
Year	Team	GP	GS	MPG	FG%	3P%	FT%	RPG	APG	SPG	BPG	PPG
2026	Portland	5	0	13.4	.412	.273	.625	1.6	.6	.4	.4	7.2
Career		5	0	13.4	.412	.273	.625	1.6	.6	.4	.4	7.2
