= Dalano Banton =

Canadian basketball player (born 1999)

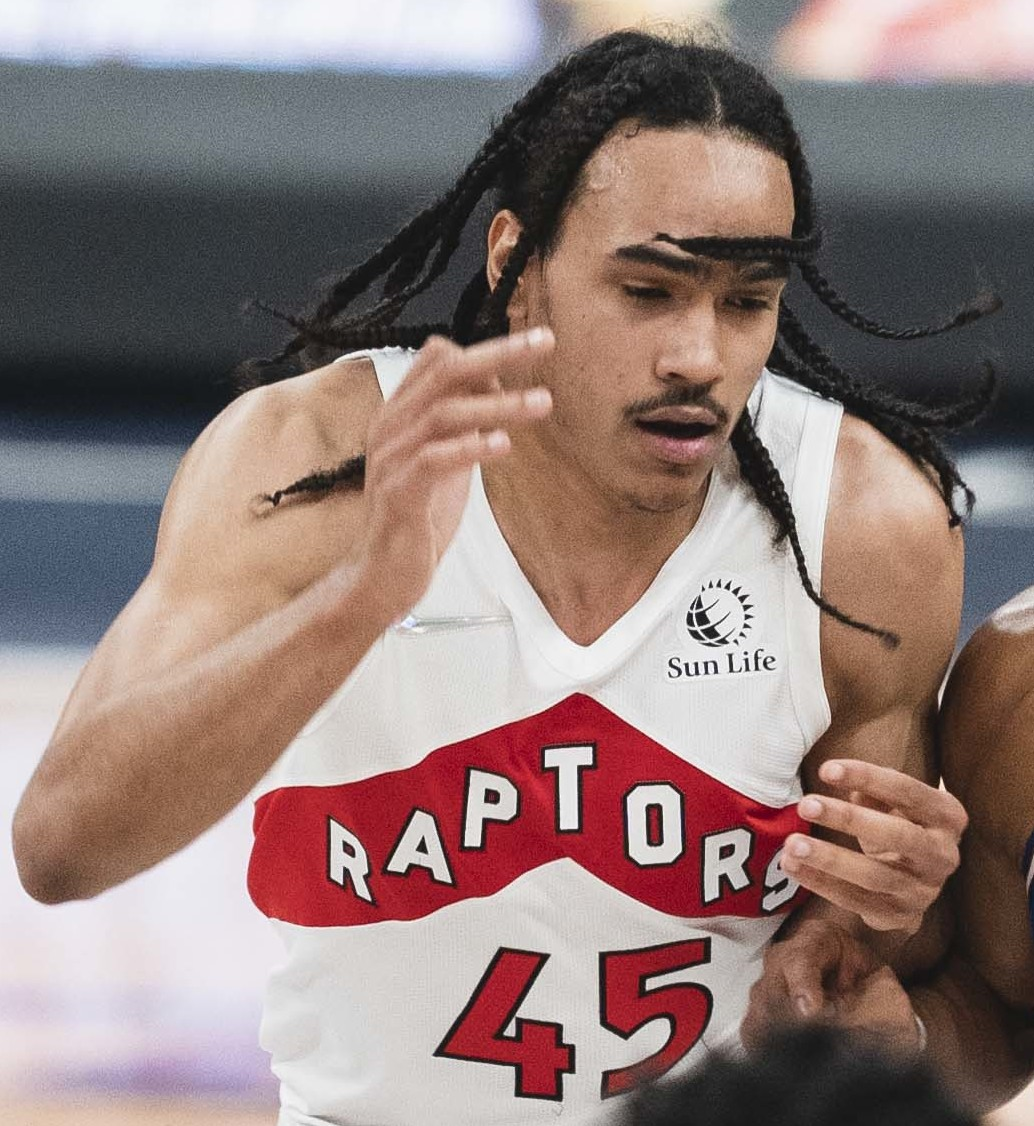
- Banton with the Toronto Raptors in 2021

Free agent
- Position: Small forward

Personal information
- Born: November 7, 1999 (age 27) Toronto, Ontario, Canada
- Listed height: 6 ft 8 in (2.03 m)
- Listed weight: 203 lb (92 kg)

Career information
- High school: Central Toronto Academy (Toronto, Ontario); MacDuffie School (Granby, Massachusetts); Redemption Christian Academy (Northfield, Massachusetts)
- College: Western Kentucky (2018–2019); Nebraska (2020–2021)
- NBA draft: 2021: 2nd round, 46th overall pick
- Drafted by: Toronto Raptors
- Playing career: 2021–present

Career history
- 2021–2023: Toronto Raptors
- 2021–2023: →Raptors 905
- 2023–2024: Boston Celtics
- 2024: →Maine Celtics
- 2024–2025: Portland Trail Blazers
- 2025–2026: Texas Legends
- 2026: Los Angeles Clippers
- 2026: Boston Celtics
- 2026: Shandong Hi-Speed Kirin
- Stats at NBA.com
- Stats at Basketball Reference

Dalano Banton (/dəˈlɑːnoʊ ˈbæntən/ də-LAH-noh BAN-tən; born November 7, 1999) is a Canadian professional basketball player who last played for the Shandong Hi-Speed Kirin of the Chinese Basketball Association (CBA). He played college basketball for the Western Kentucky Hilltoppers and Nebraska Cornhuskers. Banton was selected by the Toronto Raptors with the 46th overall pick in the 2021 NBA draft, making him the first Canadian player ever drafted by the Canadian franchise.

== Early life ==
Banton was born on November 7, 1999, in Toronto, Ontario, to a Jamaican father and a Canadian mother. He grew up in the Mount Olive area within the Rexdale neighborhood of Toronto. Banton began playing basketball as a child at the North Kipling Community Centre, the Rexdale Community Hub, and a local parking lot. He also attended basketball camps hosted by former Toronto Raptor DeMar DeRozan in the neighborhood.

Banton, originally a member of 2019 class, reclassified into 2018. He played for Redemption Christian Academy in Northfield, Massachusetts, and MacDuffie School in Granby, Massachusetts.

By the end of his high school career, Banton was a consensus four-star recruit and was ranked in the top 100 recruits nationally in 2018 by Rivals (no. 80) and 247Sports (no. 92). On November 14, 2017, Banton chose Western Kentucky over Kansas State, UMass and Minnesota.

College recruiting
Name	Hometown	School	Height	Weight	Commit date
Dalano Banton; G	Toronto, ON	Redemption Christian Academy (MA)	6 ft 7 in (2.01 m)	204 lb (93 kg)	Nov 14, 2017
Dalano Banton; G	Recruit ratings: Scout: Rivals: 247Sports: ESPN: (NR)				
Overall recruit ranking: Rivals: 80 247Sports: 92
Note: In many cases, Scout, Rivals, 247Sports, On3, and ESPN may conflict in their listings of height and weight.; In these cases, the average was taken. ESPN grades are on a 100-point scale.; Sources: "Western Kentucky 2018 Basketball Commitments". Rivals.; "2018 Western Kentucky Hilltoppers Recruiting Class". ESPN.; "2018 Team Ranking". Rivals.

== College career ==
As a freshman, Banton played 31 games at Western Kentucky, averaging 3.4 points, 3.0 rebounds and 2.1 assists per game. Banton made 12 starts and nearly had a triple-double with eight points, 13 rebounds and 10 assists in a career-high 38 minutes in a win over No. 15 Wisconsin. Banton was one of only six players in Division I basketball to have a game with at least eight points, 13 rebounds and 10 assists in 2018–19. He had three double-figure scoring efforts on the season, including a season-high 11 points against both Belmont and Saint Mary's, as he also had six assists and three blocks against the Gaels. On April 10, 2019, Banton announced his intent to transfer from Western Kentucky. On May 1, 2019, Banton announced, via Twitter, his commitment to Nebraska. Banton sat out the 2019–20 season after transferring from Western Kentucky and honed his skills on the scout team. Banton played during the Huskers' trip to Italy in August 2019, averaging 5.8 points, 3.5 rebounds, 2.5 assists and 1.3 steals per game in helping the Huskers post a 4–0 record.

On December 17, 2020, Banton recorded just the second triple-double in Nebraska men's basketball history with 13 points, 11 rebounds and 10 assists in Nebraska's 110–64 win over Doane University. He averaged 9.6 points, 5.9 rebounds and 3.9 assists per game. Following the season, he declared for the 2021 NBA draft while maintaining his college eligibility. However, on July 2 he announced he was remaining in the draft.

== Professional career ==
=== Toronto Raptors (2021–2023) ===
Banton was drafted with the 46th overall pick in the 2021 NBA draft by the Toronto Raptors, making him the first-ever Canadian to be drafted by the franchise. On August 14, he signed a multi-year contract with the Raptors. Banton chose to wear the number 45 to honour the TTC 45 Kipling bus which regularly served the neighbourhood he grew up in. He made his professional debut on October 20, 2021, in the Raptors' season- and home-opener against the Washington Wizards, and scored his first career points in the NBA with a buzzer-beating three-point field goal at the end of the third quarter. On November 13, Banton scored a season-high 12 points while adding three rebounds, two assists and a steal in a 127–121 loss to the Detroit Pistons.

On November 24, 2022, Banton scored a career-high 27 points, alongside four rebounds, four assists, three steals and two blocks, in a 115–111 win over the Detroit Pistons.

=== Boston Celtics (2023–2024) ===
On July 3, 2023, Banton signed a two-year contract with the Boston Celtics. Banton made 24 appearances (including one start) for the Celtics during the 2023–24 NBA season, recording averages of 2.3 points, 1.5 rebounds, and 0.8 assists.

=== Portland Trail Blazers (2024–2025) ===
On February 8, 2024, Banton was traded, along with cash, to the Portland Trail Blazers in exchange for a protected second-round pick. On March 27, Banton scored a new career-high 31 points along with 5 rebounds and 9 assists in a 120–106 loss to the Atlanta Hawks. In Portland's season finale against the Sacramento Kings on April 14, Banton went 0-of-15 on shots beyond the arc. In doing so, he became the first player in NBA history to attempt as many three-point shots without a make.

On November 4, 2024, Banton scored 20 points in under 12 minutes in a 118–100 victory over the New Orleans Pelicans—the first time this feat had been performed in franchise history, as well as marking only the seventh instance of a player doing so across the NBA.

=== Texas Legends (2025–2026) ===
On October 7, 2025, the Dallas Mavericks signed Banton to an Exhibit 10 contract. Just ten days later, on October 17, the Mavericks waived Banton, Dennis Smith Jr. and Jeremiah Robinson-Earl. He then signed with the Mavericks' G League affiliate, the Texas Legends.

=== Los Angeles Clippers (2026) ===
On February 8, 2026, Banton signed a ten-day contract with the Los Angeles Clippers. In two appearances for the Clippers, Banton posted averages of 3.0 points, 0.5 rebounds, and 1.0 assists. Upon the expiration of the deal, he became a free agent.

=== Second stint with Celtics (2026) ===
On February 19, 2026, Banton signed a ten-day contract to return to the Boston Celtics. On April 11, the Celtics signed Banton to a two-year, standard contract. In four appearances for the team, he averaged 1.5 points, 1.0 rebounds, and 2.3 assists. On July 9, Banton was waived by the Celtics.

=== Shandong Hi-Speed Kirin (2026) ===
On September 8, 2026, Banton signed with Shandong Hi-Speed Kirin of the Chinese Basketball Association (CBA).

== Career statistics ==
Legend
GP	Games played	GS	Games started	MPG	Minutes per game
FG%	Field goal percentage	3P%	3-point field goal percentage	FT%	Free throw percentage
RPG	Rebounds per game	APG	Assists per game	SPG	Steals per game
BPG	Blocks per game	PPG	Points per game	**Bold**	Career high

=== NBA ===
==== Regular season ====
Year	Team	GP	GS	MPG	FG%	3P%	FT%	RPG	APG	SPG	BPG	PPG
2021–22	Toronto	64	1	10.9	.411	.255	.591	1.9	1.5	.4	.2	3.2
2022–23	Toronto	31	2	9.0	.423	.294	.708	1.5	1.2	.4	.4	4.6
2023–24	Boston	24	1	7.1	.373	.125	.800	1.5	.8	.2	.1	2.3
2023–24	Portland	30	**8**	**29.2**	.408	.311	.780	**4.8**	**3.6**	**.9**	.6	**16.7**
2024–25	Portland	**67**	7	16.7	.391	**.324**	.728	2.0	2.4	.6	.5	8.3
2025–26	L.A. Clippers	2	0	5.0	**.750**	—	—	.5	1.0	.5	—	3.0
2025–26	Boston	4	0	13.0	.125	.000	**1.000**	1.0	2.3	.3	**1.3**	1.5
Career		222	19	14.4	.401	.303	.732	2.2	2.0	.5	.4	6.6

==== Playoffs ====
Year	Team	GP	GS	MPG	FG%	3P%	FT%	RPG	APG	SPG	BPG	PPG
2022	Toronto	**4**	0	**2.0**	**1.000**	–	**.500**	**.5**	**.3**	**.3**	.0	**1.8**
2026	Boston	2	0	**2.0**	**1.000**	–	–	.0	.0	.0	.0	1.0
Career		6	0	2.0	1.000	–	.500	.3	.2	.2	.0	1.5

=== College ===
Year	Team	GP	GS	MPG	FG%	3P%	FT%	RPG	APG	SPG	BPG	PPG
2018–19	Western Kentucky	**31**	12	15.1	.402	.216	.559	3.0	2.1	.5	.5	3.4
2019–20	Nebraska	Redshirt										
2020–21	Nebraska	27	**22**	**27.3**	**.411**	**.247**	**.659**	**5.9**	**3.9**	**1.0**	**.9**	**9.6**
Career		58	34	20.8	.408	.237	.631	4.3	2.9	.7	.7	6.3
