= 2023–24 Portland Trail Blazers season =

- Head coach: Chauncey Billups
- General manager: Joe Cronin
- Owner: Jody Allen
- Arena: Moda Center

Results
- Record: 21–61 (.256)
- Place: Division: 5th (Northwest); Conference: 15th (Western)
- Playoff finish: Did not qualify
- Stats at Basketball Reference

Local media
- Television: Root Sports Northwest
- Radio: KPOJ, Portland Trail Blazers Radio

The 2023–24 Portland Trail Blazers season was the 54th season of the franchise in the National Basketball Association (NBA). This became the first season in franchise history where Portland would have an NBA G League team of their own to be affiliated with by the Rip City Remix, thus leaving every NBA team outside of the Phoenix Suns with an official affiliate or partnership involved with a G League development team. This is also the first season since 2011–12 without Damian Lillard on the roster, as he was traded to the Milwaukee Bucks in exchange for Jrue Holiday, Deandre Ayton, Toumani Camara, and a 2029 first-round draft pick. Four days later, Holiday was traded to the Boston Celtics in exchange for Robert Williams III, Malcolm Brogdon, and two future first-round draft picks.

The Blazers became the fourteenth team in NBA history to record a winless month, going 0–9 in February. On March 16, 2024, they were eliminated from playoff contention for the third straight season with their 126–107 loss to the New Orleans Pelicans.

The Portland Trail Blazers drew an average home attendance of 18,326 in 41 home games in the 2023–24 NBA season.

== Draft picks ==
Round	Pick	Player	Position	Nationality	School / club team
1	3	Scoot Henderson	PG	United States	NBA G League Ignite (NBA G League)
1	23	Kris Murray	PF	United States	Iowa
2	43	Rayan Rupert	SG	France	New Zealand Breakers (Australia)

The Trail Blazers entered the draft holding two first round picks and one second round pick. They kept their lottery pick that landed 2nd overall, while the two others were acquired through previous trades. They had traded their original second-round pick to the Cleveland Cavaliers before it was eventually used by the Boston Celtics in the draft.

With their first selection, the Trail Blazers would select NBA G League Ignite point guard Scoot Henderson as the #3 pick of the draft. Then, near the end of the first round, the Trail Blazers selected power forward Kris Murray from the University of Iowa as the 23rd pick. Finally, around the middle of the second round, Portland would end their draft night by selecting French shooting guard Rayan Rupert of the New Zealand Breakers in Australia's National Basketball League.

== Roster ==
2023–24 Portland Trail Blazers roster
Players

Pos.	No.	Player	Height	Weight	DOB	From
C	2	Deandre Ayton	7 ft 0 in (2.13 m)	250 lb (113 kg)	1998-07-23	Arizona
C	41	Ibou Badji (TW)	7 ft 0 in (2.13 m)	240 lb (109 kg)	2002-10-13	NBA Academy Africa (SEN)
G	5	Dalano Banton	6 ft 8 in (2.03 m)	204 lb (93 kg)	1999-11-07	Nebraska
G	11	Malcolm Brogdon	6 ft 4 in (1.93 m)	229 lb (104 kg)	1992-12-11	Virginia
C	10	Moses Brown (injured)	7 ft 2 in (2.18 m)	245 lb (111 kg)	1999-10-13	UCLA
F	33	Toumani Camara	6 ft 7 in (2.01 m)	220 lb (100 kg)	2000-05-08	Dayton
F	9	Jerami Grant	6 ft 7 in (2.01 m)	210 lb (95 kg)	1994-03-12	Syracuse
G	19	Ashton Hagans (TW)	6 ft 3 in (1.91 m)	190 lb (86 kg)	1999-07-08	Kentucky
G	00	Scoot Henderson	6 ft 3 in (1.91 m)	195 lb (88 kg)	2004-02-03	Carlton J. Kell HS (GA)
F	24	Justin Minaya (TW)	6 ft 5 in (1.96 m)	210 lb (95 kg)	1999-03-26	Providence
F	8	Kris Murray	6 ft 8 in (2.03 m)	220 lb (100 kg)	2000-08-19	Iowa
C	26	Duop Reath	6 ft 9 in (2.06 m)	245 lb (111 kg)	1996-06-26	LSU
G	72	Rayan Rupert	6 ft 6 in (1.98 m)	205 lb (93 kg)	2004-05-31	France
G/F	17	Shaedon Sharpe	6 ft 5 in (1.96 m)	200 lb (91 kg)	2003-05-30	Dream City Christian (AZ)
G	1	Anfernee Simons	6 ft 3 in (1.91 m)	181 lb (82 kg)	1999-06-08	IMG Academy (FL)
G/F	4	Matisse Thybulle	6 ft 5 in (1.96 m)	201 lb (91 kg)	1997-03-04	Washington
F	34	Jabari Walker	6 ft 7 in (2.01 m)	210 lb (95 kg)	2002-07-30	Colorado
C	35	Robert III Williams (injured)	6 ft 9 in (2.06 m)	237 lb (108 kg)	1997-10-17	Texas A&M

Coaches
Head coach
- Chauncey Billups
Assistant(s)
- Rodney Billups
- Scott Brooks
- Jonah Herscu
- Steve Hetzel
- Roy Rogers

Legend
- (DP) Unsigned draft pick
- (FA) Free agent
- (S) Suspended
- (GL) On assignment to G League
- (TW) Two-way affiliate player
- Injured

Roster
Updated: April 18, 2024

== Standings ==
=== Division ===
Northwest Division	W	L	PCT	GB	Home	Road	Div	GP
c – Oklahoma City Thunder	57	25	.695	–	33‍–‍8	24‍–‍17	12‍–‍4	82
x – Denver Nuggets	57	25	.695	–	33‍–‍8	24‍–‍17	10‍–‍6	82
x – Minnesota Timberwolves	56	26	.683	1.0	30‍–‍11	26‍–‍15	12‍–‍4	82
Utah Jazz	31	51	.378	26.0	21‍–‍20	10‍–‍31	5‍–‍11	82
Portland Trail Blazers	21	61	.256	36.0	11‍–‍30	10‍–‍31	1‍–‍15	82

=== Conference ===
Western Conference
#	Team	W	L	PCT	GB	GP
1	c – Oklahoma City Thunder *	57	25	.695	–	82
2	x – Denver Nuggets	57	25	.695	–	82
3	x – Minnesota Timberwolves	56	26	.683	1.0	82
4	y – Los Angeles Clippers *	51	31	.622	6.0	82
5	y – Dallas Mavericks *	50	32	.610	7.0	82
6	x – Phoenix Suns	49	33	.598	8.0	82
7	x – New Orleans Pelicans	49	33	.598	8.0	82
8	x – Los Angeles Lakers	47	35	.573	10.0	82
9	pi – Sacramento Kings	46	36	.561	11.0	82
10	pi – Golden State Warriors	46	36	.561	11.0	82
11	Houston Rockets	41	41	.500	16.0	82
12	Utah Jazz	31	51	.378	26.0	82
13	Memphis Grizzlies	27	55	.329	30.0	82
14	San Antonio Spurs	22	60	.268	35.0	82
15	Portland Trail Blazers	21	61	.256	36.0	82

== Game log ==
=== Preseason ===
2023 preseason game log
Total: 1–3 (Home: 1–1; Road: 0–2)
Preseason: 1–3 (home: 1–1; road: 0–2)

Game	Date	Team	Score	High points	High rebounds	High assists	Location Attendance	Record
1	October 10	New Zealand	W 106–66	Anfernee Simons (14)	Moses Brown (8)	Scoot Henderson (6)	Moda Center; 12,694	1–0
2	October 12	Phoenix	L 111–122	Scoot Henderson (22)	Ayton, Walker (6)	Skylar Mays (5)	Moda Center; 17,713	1–1
3	October 14	@ Utah	L 133–138	Anfernee Simons (29)	Sharpe, Walker (7)	Scoot Henderson (8)	Delta Center; 14,746	1–2
4	October 16	@ Phoenix	L 106–117	Shaedon Sharpe (19)	Jabari Walker (9)	Scoot Henderson (5)	Footprint Center; 17,071	1–3

2023–24 preseason schedule

=== Regular season ===
This became the first regular season where all the NBA teams competed in a mid-season tournament setting due to the implementation of the 2023 NBA In-Season Tournament.

2023–24 game log
Total: 21–61 (Home: 11–30; Road: 10–31)
October: 1–3 (home: 0–1; road: 1–2)

Game	Date	Team	Score	High points	High rebounds	High assists	Location Attendance	Record
1	October 25	@ L.A. Clippers	L 111–123	Malcolm Brogdon (20)	Deandre Ayton (12)	Malcolm Brogdon (5)	Crypto.com Arena; 19,370	0–1
2	October 27	Orlando	L 97–102	Shaedon Sharpe (24)	Deandre Ayton (15)	Camara, Grant (3)	Moda Center; 19,464	0–2
3	October 29	@ Philadelphia	L 98–126	Shaedon Sharpe (20)	Deandre Ayton (9)	Malcolm Brogdon (5)	Wells Fargo Center; 19,768	0–3
4	October 30	@ Toronto	W 99–91	Jerami Grant (22)	Deandre Ayton (23)	Scoot Henderson (7)	Scotiabank Arena; 19,266	1–3

November: 5–9 (home: 2–4; road: 3–5)

Game	Date	Team	Score	High points	High rebounds	High assists	Location Attendance	Record
5	November 1	@ Detroit	W 110–101	Shaedon Sharpe (29)	Deandre Ayton (11)	Scoot Henderson (7)	Little Caesars Arena; 16,912	2–3
6	November 3	Memphis	W 115–113 (OT)	Jerami Grant (26)	Deandre Ayton (12)	Malcolm Brogdon (10)	Moda Center; 18,592	3–3
7	November 5	Memphis	L 100–112	Jerami Grant (27)	Deandre Ayton (11)	Malcolm Brogdon (11)	Moda Center; 18,187	3–4
8	November 8	@ Sacramento	L 118–121 (OT)	Jerami Grant (38)	Deandre Ayton (10)	Skylar Mays (11)	Golden 1 Center; 17,829	3–5
9	November 12	@ L.A. Lakers	L 110–116	Jerami Grant (23)	Deandre Ayton (7)	Skylar Mays (12)	Crypto.com Arena; 18,997	3–6
10	November 14	@ Utah	L 99–115	Jerami Grant (26)	Deandre Ayton (10)	Skylar Mays (10)	Delta Center; 18,206	3–7
11	November 15	Cleveland	L 95–109	Jerami Grant (17)	Shaedon Sharpe (7)	Shaedon Sharpe (5)	Moda Center; 18,137	3–8
12	November 17	L.A. Lakers	L 95–107	Jerami Grant (24)	Deandre Ayton (12)	Skylar Mays (8)	Moda Center; 18,570	3–9
13	November 19	Oklahoma City	L 91–134	Jerami Grant (14)	Jabari Walker (7)	Skylar Mays (7)	Moda Center; 18,235	3–10
14	November 21	@ Phoenix	L 107–120	Jerami Grant (26)	Deandre Ayton (8)	Jerami Grant (6)	Footprint Center; 17,071	3–11
15	November 22	Utah	W 121–105	Jerami Grant (30)	Jabari Walker (10)	Malcolm Brogdon (8)	Moda Center; 17,819	4–11
16	November 26	@ Milwaukee	L 102–108	Jerami Grant (22)	Deandre Ayton (13)	Malcolm Brogdon (12)	Fiserv Forum; 17,602	4–12
17	November 27	@ Indiana	W 114–110	Jerami Grant (34)	Deandre Ayton (13)	Malcolm Brogdon (7)	Gainbridge Fieldhouse; 14,508	5–12
18	November 30	@ Cleveland	W 103–95	Shaedon Sharpe (29)	Jabari Walker (12)	Brogdon, Henderson (7)	Rocket Mortgage FieldHouse; 19,432	6–12

December: 3–10 (home: 3–6; road: 0–4)

Game	Date	Team	Score	High points	High rebounds	High assists	Location Attendance	Record
19	December 2	@ Utah	L 113–118 (OT)	Brogdon, Sharpe (25)	Deandre Ayton (11)	Malcolm Brogdon (6)	Delta Center; 18,206	6–13
20	December 6	@ Golden State	L 106–110	Anfernee Simons (28)	Toumani Camara (13)	Shaedon Sharpe (5)	Chase Center; 18,064	6–14
21	December 8	Dallas	L 112–125	Anfernee Simons (30)	Camara, Sharpe (9)	Anfernee Simons (8)	Moda Center; 18,762	6–15
22	December 11	@ L.A. Clippers	L 127–132	Anfernee Simons (38)	Moses Brown (12)	Henderson, Sharpe (6)	Crypto.com Arena; 17,102	6–16
23	December 14	Utah	L 114–122	Scoot Henderson (23)	Ayton, Walker (9)	Scoot Henderson (10)	Moda Center; 17,842	6–17
24	December 16	Dallas	L 120–131	Anfernee Simons (33)	Deandre Ayton (10)	Anfernee Simons (6)	Moda Center; 18,439	6–18
25	December 17	Golden State	L 114–118	Jerami Grant (30)	Deandre Ayton (8)	Anfernee Simons (7)	Moda Center; 18,547	6–19
26	December 19	Phoenix	W 109–104	Anfernee Simons (23)	Deandre Ayton (15)	Anfernee Simons (7)	Moda Center; 18,233	7–19
27	December 21	Washington	L 117–118	Anfernee Simons (41)	Deandre Ayton (16)	Anfernee Simons (7)	Moda Center; 18,690	7–20
28	December 23	@ Golden State	L 106–126	Anfernee Simons (25)	Brogdon, Ayton (6)	Malcolm Brogdon (12)	Chase Center; 18,064	7–21
29	December 26	Sacramento	W 130–113	Anfernee Simons (29)	Moses Brown (11)	Scoot Henderson (11)	Moda Center; 18,585	8–21
30	December 28	San Antonio	L 105–118	Brogdon, Grant (29)	Jerami Grant (10)	Malcolm Brogdon (6)	Moda Center; 19,335	8–22
31	December 29	San Antonio	W 134–128	Brogdon, Grant (27)	Toumani Camara (11)	Scoot Henderson (11)	Moda Center; 18,861	9–22

January: 6–11 (home: 4–2; road: 2–9)

Game	Date	Team	Score	High points	High rebounds	High assists	Location Attendance	Record
32	January 1	@ Phoenix	L 88–109	Scoot Henderson (17)	Jabari Walker (9)	Scoot Henderson (6)	Footprint Center; 17,071	9–23
33	January 3	@ Dallas	L 97–126	Shaedon Sharpe (16)	six players (5)	Scoot Henderson (7)	American Airlines Center; 20,077	9–24
34	January 5	@ Dallas	L 103–139	Jerami Grant (18)	Camara, Reath (7)	Scoot Henderson (10)	American Airlines Center; 20,162	9–25
35	January 7	@ Brooklyn	W 134–127 (OT)	Anfernee Simons (38)	Duop Reath (13)	Anfernee Simons (11)	Barclays Center; 17,732	10–25
36	January 9	@ New York	L 84–112	Jerami Grant (21)	Ibou Badji (7)	Henderson, Sharpe (4)	Madison Square Garden; 19,812	10–26
37	January 11	@ Oklahoma City	L 77–139	Anfernee Simons (14)	Duop Reath (7)	six players (2)	Paycom Center; 15,828	10–27
38	January 12	@ Minnesota	L 93–116	Jabari Walker (17)	Jabari Walker (13)	Scoot Henderson (4)	Target Center; 18,024	10–28
39	January 14	Phoenix	L 116–127	Scoot Henderson (33)	Jabari Walker (8)	Scoot Henderson (9)	Moda Center; 18,071	10–29
40	January 17	Brooklyn	W 105–103	Jerami Grant (30)	Jerami Grant (8)	Malcolm Brogdon (6)	Moda Center; 17,021	11–29
41	January 19	Indiana	W 118–115	Jerami Grant (37)	Jabari Walker (12)	Malcolm Brogdon (6)	Moda Center; 18,595	12–29
42	January 21	@ L.A. Lakers	L 110–134	Malcolm Brodgon (23)	Brogdon, Walker (7)	Malcolm Brodgon (9)	Crypto.com Arena; 18,997	12–30
43	January 23	@ Oklahoma City	L 109–111	Scoot Henderson (19)	Jabari Walker (13)	Brogdon, Henderson (7)	Paycom Center; 15,874	12–31
44	January 24	@ Houston	W 137–131 (OT)	Anfernee Simons (33)	Deandre Ayton (17)	Jerami Grant (9)	Toyota Center; 18,055	13–31
45	January 26	@ San Antonio	L 100–116	Anfernee Simons (40)	Deandre Ayton (12)	Anfernee Simons (10)	Frost Bank Center; 17,274	13–32
46	January 28	Chicago	L 96–104	Jerami Grant (24)	Deandre Ayton (12)	Anfernee Simons (8)	Moda Center; 17,899	13–33
47	January 29	Philadelphia	W 130–104	Jerami Grant (27)	Jabari Walker (12)	Malcolm Brogdon (9)	Moda Center; 17,128	14–33
48	January 31	Milwaukee	W 119–116	Anfernee Simons (24)	Deandre Ayton (11)	Malcolm Brogdon (6)	Moda Center; 19,335	15–33

February: 0–9 (home: 0–7; road: 0–2)

Game	Date	Team	Score	High points	High rebounds	High assists	Location Attendance	Record
49	February 2	@ Denver	L 108–120	Scoot Henderson (30)	Brogdon, Walker (8)	Malcolm Brogdon (6)	Ball Arena; 19,622	15–34
50	February 4	@ Denver	L 103–112	Deandre Ayton (27)	Deandre Ayton (9)	Henderson, Simons (9)	Ball Arena; 19,715	15–35
51	February 8	Detroit	L 122–128 (OT)	Jerami Grant (49)	Jabari Walker (11)	Matisse Thybulle (7)	Moda Center; 18,125	15–36
52	February 10	New Orleans	L 84–93	Jerami Grant (24)	Deandre Ayton (17)	Grant, Hagans (4)	Moda Center; 18,226	15–37
53	February 13	Minnesota	L 109–121	Deandre Ayton (22)	Deandre Ayton (16)	Scoot Henderson (9)	Moda Center; 17,906	15–38
54	February 15	Minnesota	L 91–128	Jerami Grant (20)	Camara, Simons (5)	Anfernee Simons (6)	Moda Center; 18,606	15–39
All-Star Game
55	February 23	Denver	L 112–127	Jerami Grant (25)	Deandre Ayton (10)	Anfernee Simons (8)	Moda Center; 18,898	15–40
56	February 25	Charlotte	L 80–93	Deandre Ayton (26)	Deandre Ayton (19)	Jerami Grant (5)	Moda Center; 17,888	15–41
57	February 27	Miami	L 96–106	Anfernee Simons (26)	Ayton, Camara (10)	Jerami Grant (6)	Moda Center; 18,143	15–42

March: 4–13 (home: 2–7; road: 2–6)

Game	Date	Team	Score	High points	High rebounds	High assists	Location Attendance	Record
58	March 1	@ Memphis	W 122–92	Banton, Walker (19)	Jabari Walker (10)	Anfernee Simons (8)	FedExForum; 15,493	16–42
59	March 2	@ Memphis	W 107–100 (OT)	Anfernee Simons (30)	Jabari Walker (12)	Ashton Hagans (8)	FedExForum; 16,381	17–42
60	March 4	@ Minnesota	L 114–119	Anfernee Simons (32)	Jabari Walker (8)	Anfernee Simons (14)	Target Center; 18,024	17–43
61	March 6	Oklahoma City	L 120–128	Anfernee Simons (29)	Thybulle, Walker (6)	Banton, Simons (5)	Moda Center; 17,589	17–44
62	March 8	Houston	L 107–123	Dalano Banton (30)	Kris Murray (11)	Kris Murray (7)	Moda Center; 18,139	17–45
63	March 9	Toronto	W 128–118 (OT)	Deandre Ayton (30)	Deandre Ayton (19)	Anfernee Simons (7)	Moda Center; 18,117	18–45
64	March 11	Boston	L 99–121	Deandre Ayton (22)	Deandre Ayton (15)	Scoot Henderson (8)	Moda Center; 18,480	18–46
65	March 13	Atlanta	W 106–102	Anfernee Simons (36)	Deandre Ayton (19)	Anfernee Simons (8)	Moda Center; 18,064	19–46
66	March 14	New York	L 93–105	Deandre Ayton (31)	Deandre Ayton (14)	Scoot Henderson (6)	Moda Center; 17,768	19–47
67	March 16	@ New Orleans	L 107–126	Dalano Banton (28)	Deandre Ayton (8)	Anfernee Simons (8)	Smoothie King Center; 17,725	19–48
68	March 18	@ Chicago	L 107–110	Anfernee Simons (30)	Deandre Ayton (15)	Anfernee Simons (9)	United Center; 20,293	19–49
69	March 20	L.A. Clippers	L 103–116	Scoot Henderson (18)	Deandre Ayton (7)	Dalano Banton (6)	Moda Center; 17,504	19–50
70	March 22	L.A. Clippers	L 117–125	Scoot Henderson (24)	Jabari Walker (8)	Scoot Henderson (10)	Moda Center; 18,660	19–51
71	March 23	Denver	L 111–114	Duop Reath (24)	Jabari Walker (9)	Camara, Hagans, Henderson (6)	Moda Center; 18,629	19–52
72	March 25	@ Houston	L 92–110	Dalano Banton (28)	Dalano Banton (11)	Dalano Banton (5)	Toyota Center; 16,537	19–53
73	March 27	@ Atlanta	L 106–120	Dalano Banton (31)	Rayan Rupert (6)	Dalano Banton (9)	State Farm Arena; 16,059	19–54
74	March 29	@ Miami	L 82–142	Scoot Henderson (20)	Dalano Banton (9)	Scoot Henderson (6)	Kaseya Center; 19,839	19–55

April: 2–6 (home: 0–3; road: 2–3)

Game	Date	Team	Score	High points	High rebounds	High assists	Location Attendance	Record
75	April 1	@ Orlando	L 103–104	Dalano Banton (26)	Deandre Ayton (12)	Scoot Henderson (9)	Kia Center; 19,004	19–56
76	April 3	@ Charlotte	W 89–86	Deandre Ayton (24)	Jabari Walker (22)	Scoot Henderson (10)	Spectrum Center; 14,209	20–56
77	April 5	@ Washington	W 108–102	Deandre Ayton (34)	Ayton, Walker (13)	Dalano Banton (8)	Capital One Arena; 18,079	21–56
78	April 7	@ Boston	L 107–124	Dalano Banton (28)	Jabari Walker (18)	Dalano Banton (9)	TD Garden; 19,156	21–57
79	April 9	New Orleans	L 100–110	Deandre Ayton (30)	Deandre Ayton (13)	Scoot Henderson (15)	Moda Center; 18,341	21–58
80	April 11	Golden State	L 92–100	Deandre Ayton (25)	Jabari Walker (16)	Scoot Henderson (12)	Moda Center; 19,335	21–59
81	April 12	Houston	L 107–116	Scoot Henderson (30)	Dalano Banton (10)	Scoot Henderson (7)	Moda Center; 18,630	21–60
82	April 14	@ Sacramento	L 82–121	Dalano Banton (17)	Kris Murray (18)	Dalano Banton (7)	Golden 1 Center; 18,037	21–61

2023–24 season schedule

=== In-season tournament ===
This was the first regular season where all the NBA teams competed in a mid-season tournament setting due to the implementation of the 2023 NBA In-Season Tournament. During the in-season tournament period, the Trail Blazers competed in Group A of the Western Conference, which included the Memphis Grizzlies, the Phoenix Suns, the Los Angeles Lakers, and the Utah Jazz. While the Trail Blazers started the In-Season Tournament with an overtime win over the Grizzlies, subsequent losses to the Lakers, Jazz, and Suns that happened during an 8-game losing streak in November eliminated the Trail Blazers from the tournament.

==== West group A ====
Pos	Team	Pld	W	L	PF	PA	PD	Qualification	LAL	PHX	UTA	POR	MEM
1	Los Angeles Lakers	4	4	0	494	420	+74	Advance to knockout stage	—	122–119	131–99	107–95	134–107
2	Phoenix Suns	4	3	1	480	446	+34	Advance to knockout stage	119–122	—	131–128	120–107	110–89
3	Utah Jazz	4	2	2	469	482	−13		99–131	128–131	—	115–99	127–121
4	Portland Trail Blazers	4	1	3	416	455	−39		95–107	107–120	99–115	—	115–113 (OT)
5	Memphis Grizzlies	4	0	4	430	486	−56		107–134	89–110	121–127	113–115 (OT)	—

Source: NBA
Rules for classification: Tiebreakers

== Player statistics ==
Legend
GP	Games played	GS	Games started	MPG	Minutes per game
FG%	Field-goal percentage	3P%	3-point field-goal percentage	FT%	Free-throw percentage
RPG	Rebounds per game	APG	Assists per game	SPG	Steals per game
BPG	Blocks per game	PPG	Points per game

=== Regular season ===
Portland Trail Blazers statistics
Player	GP	GS	MPG	FG%	3P%	FT%	RPG	APG	SPG	BPG	PPG
Deandre Ayton	55	55	32.4	.570	.100	.823	11.1	1.6	1.0	.8	16.7
Ibou Badji	22	1	10.3	.636		.500	2.3	.6	.1	.9	1.5
Dalano Banton^{†}	30	8	29.2	.408	.311	.780	4.8	3.6	.9	.6	16.7
Jamaree Bouyea^{†}	6	0	9.5	.238	.000		1.7	1.3	.0	.0	1.7
Malcolm Brogdon	39	25	28.7	.440	.412	.819	3.8	5.5	.7	.2	15.7
Moses Brown	22	5	9.1	.508		.290	3.9	.3	.2	.3	3.4
Toumani Camara	70	49	24.8	.450	.337	.758	4.9	1.2	.9	.5	7.5
Jerami Grant	54	54	33.9	.451	.402	.817	3.5	2.8	.8	.6	21.0
Ashton Hagans	19	1	16.6	.408	.320	.824	2.4	2.8	.6	.5	4.2
Scoot Henderson	62	32	28.5	.385	.325	.819	3.1	5.4	.8	.2	14.0
Skylar Mays^{†}	21	5	17.0	.384	.286	.765	1.8	3.6	.7	.1	6.3
Justin Minaya	34	1	11.2	.297	.245	.556	1.6	.6	.3	.3	1.8
Taze Moore	4	0	10.0	.421	.143	.500	2.0	1.3	.5	.0	4.5
Kris Murray	62	29	21.7	.396	.268	.661	3.6	1.3	.9	.3	6.1
Duop Reath	68	20	17.9	.461	.359	.742	3.7	1.0	.5	.6	9.1
Rayan Rupert	39	12	16.2	.335	.359	.760	2.4	1.6	.3	.1	4.0
Shaedon Sharpe	32	25	33.1	.406	.333	.824	5.0	2.9	.9	.4	15.9
Anfernee Simons	46	46	34.4	.430	.385	.916	3.6	5.5	.5	.1	22.6
Matisse Thybulle	65	19	22.9	.397	.346	.759	2.1	1.4	1.7	.8	5.4
Ish Wainright^{†}	7	0	6.6	.333	.375	1.000	1.3	.0	.3	.1	2.9
Jabari Walker	72	23	23.6	.460	.295	.754	7.1	1.0	.6	.3	8.9
Robert Williams III	6	0	19.8	.654		.778	6.3	.8	1.2	1.2	6.8

- ^{†} Denotes player spent time with another team in the season. Stats reflect time with the Trail Blazers only.

== Transactions ==
=== Trades ===
September 27, 2023	Three–team trade
September 27, 2023	To Portland Trail Blazers Deandre Ayton (from Phoenix) Toumani Camara (from Phoenix) Jrue Holiday (from Milwaukee) 2029 first round pick (from Milwaukee) Right to swap 2028 first round pick with Milwaukee Right to swap 2030 first round pick with Milwaukee	To Phoenix Suns Jusuf Nurkić (from Portland) Nassir Little (from Portland) Keon Johnson (from Portland) Grayson Allen (from Milwaukee)
September 27, 2023	To Milwaukee Bucks Damian Lillard (from Portland)
October 1, 2023	To Portland Trail Blazers Malcolm Brogdon; Robert Williams III; 2024 GSW first-round pick 2029 BOS unprotected first-round pick	To Boston Celtics Jrue Holiday

=== Free agency ===
==== Re-signed ====
Player	Signed	Ref.
Jerami Grant	5 year $160M	
Skylar Mays	Two-way contract	

==== Additions ====
Player	Signed	Former Team	Ref.
Moses Brown	1 year $2M	Brooklyn Nets	
Duop Reath	Two-way contract	(Lebanon) Al Riyadi Club Beirut	
Ibou Badji	Two-way contract	Wisconsin Herd	

==== Subtractions ====
Player	Reason	New Team	Ref.
Drew Eubanks	Free agency	Phoenix Suns	
Cam Reddish	Free agency	Los Angeles Lakers	
Trendon Watford	Waived	Brooklyn Nets	
Jeenathan Williams	Waived	Houston Rockets	
Chance Comanche	Waived / Free Agency	Sacramento Kings / Stockton Kings	
