= Justin Minaya =

Dominican-American basketball player (born 1999)

- Minaya with FC Barcelona in 2026

No. 24 – FC Barcelona
- Position: Small forward
- League: Liga ACB; EuroLeague

Personal information
- Born: March 26, 1999 (age 27) Harrington Park, New Jersey, U.S.
- Listed height: 6 ft 5 in (1.96 m)
- Listed weight: 205 lb (93 kg)

Career information
- High school: Northern Valley (Old Tappan, New Jersey)
- College: South Carolina (2017–2021); Providence (2021–2022)
- NBA draft: 2022: undrafted
- Playing career: 2022–present

Career history
- 2022–2023: Mexico City Capitanes
- 2023–2025: Portland Trail Blazers
- 2023–2025: →Rip City Remix
- 2025–2026: Osceola Magic
- 2026–present: FC Barcelona
- Stats at NBA.com
- Stats at Basketball Reference

Justin Minaya (born March 26, 1999) is a Dominican-American professional basketball player for FC Barcelona of the Liga ACB and the EuroLeague. He played college basketball for South Carolina and Providence. He is the son of Major League Baseball executive Omar Minaya.

== College career ==
Coming out of high school, Minaya was an unranked recruit but received several offers to play college basketball. He received official offers from South Carolina, UNC Wilmington, Boston University, Illinois, Iona and UMass. Minaya officially visited with South Carolina and UNC Wilmington before committing to South Carolina, signing his letter of intent on May 15, 2017.

Minaya played four seasons with the Gamecocks from 2017 to 2021, only playing 5 games in 2018–19 due to a severe knee injury. In 2020, Minaya also underwent surgery on his thumb. He played all four years at South Carolina under head coach Frank Martin.

After four years at South Carolina, Minaya transferred to Providence for his graduate season. At Providence, Minaya averaged 6.5 points per game and started in 25 out of the 32 games he played in the 2021–22 season. The Friars won the Big East regular season championship in 2022 and advanced to Sweet 16 in the NCAA tournament, defeating South Dakota State and Richmond before losing to Kansas.

== Professional career ==
=== Mexico City Capitanes (2022–2023) ===
After going undrafted in the 2022 NBA draft, Minaya joined the Charlotte Hornets for the 2022 NBA Summer League. He was named to the Mexico City Capitanes' roster to start the 2022–23 NBA G League season.

=== Portland Trail Blazers (2023–2025) ===
On April 4, 2023, Minaya signed a 10-day contract with the Portland Trail Blazers and made his NBA debut that night, scoring 8 points in a 119–109 loss to the Memphis Grizzlies.

In June 2023, Minaya joined the Blazers for the 2023 NBA Summer League and on October 2, he re-signed with the Trail Blazers. On October 21, 2023, his deal was converted to a two-way contract with the Rip City Remix of the NBA G League.

On July 1, 2024, Minaya signed a second two-way contract with Portland.

=== FC Barcelona (2026–present) ===
After a season with the Osceola Magic, Minaya signed with FC Barcelona of the Liga ACB and the EuroLeague on September 1, 2026.

== National team career ==
Minaya played for the Dominican Republic national basketball team at the 2015 Centrobasket U17 Championship for Men and 2016 FIBA Under-17 World Championship.

== Career statistics ==
Legend
GP	Games played	GS	Games started	MPG	Minutes per game
FG%	Field goal percentage	3P%	3-point field goal percentage	FT%	Free throw percentage
RPG	Rebounds per game	APG	Assists per game	SPG	Steals per game
BPG	Blocks per game	PPG	Points per game	**Bold**	Career high

=== NBA ===
==== Regular season ====
Year	Team	GP	GS	MPG	FG%	3P%	FT%	RPG	APG	SPG	BPG	PPG
2022–23	Portland	4	0	**22.2**	.304	**.250**	.000	**3.8**	**1.0**	**.5**	**1.3**	**4.3**
2023–24	Portland	**34**	**1**	11.2	.297	.245	**.556**	1.6	.6	.3	.3	1.8
2024–25	Portland	19	0	5.3	**.381**	.200	.000	.5	.4	.3	.1	.9
Career		57	1	10.0	.314	.239	.417	1.4	.6	.3	.3	1.7
