= 2022 Metropolitans 92 vs. NBA G League Ignite series =

Exhibition basketball games

Metropolitans 92 vs. NBA G League Ignite
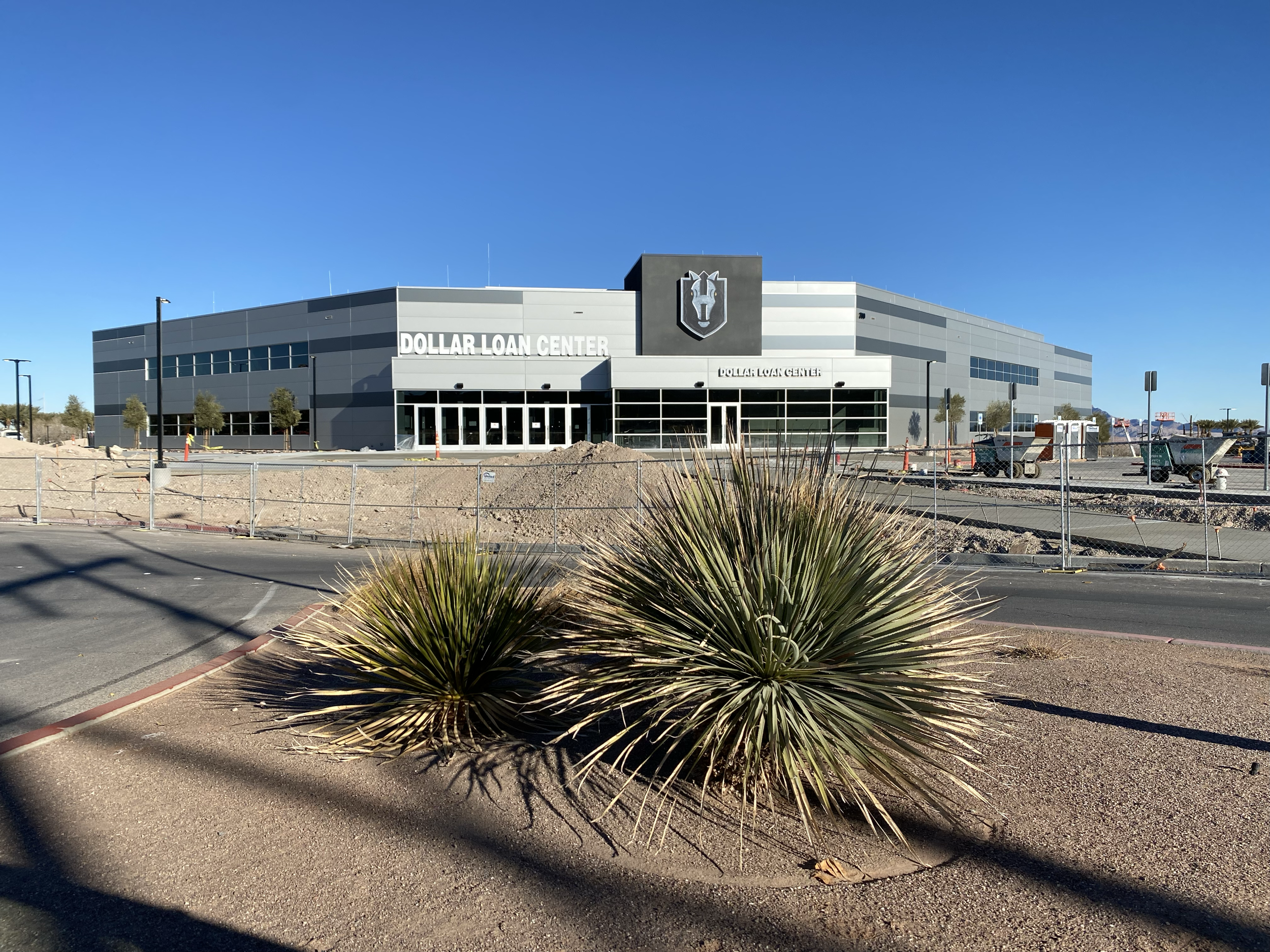
- Dollar Loan Center, the site of the games
- Date: October 4, 2022; October 6, 2022
- Venue: Dollar Loan Center
- Location: Henderson, Nevada
- Participants: Metropolitans 92; NBA G League Ignite
- Outcome: Series tied, 1–1

The 2022 Metropolitans 92 vs. NBA G League Ignite series was two exhibition basketball games between Metropolitans 92 and the NBA G League Ignite. It was held at the Dollar Loan Center in Henderson, Nevada on October 4 and October 6, 2022. The games featured the projected top two picks in the 2023 NBA draft, Victor Wembanyama of Metropolitans and Scoot Henderson of the Ignite. The Ignite won Game 1, 122–115, with strong performances from Wembanyama and Henderson, and Wembanyama led Metropolitans to a 112–106 win in Game 2, as Henderson left with an injury in the first quarter.

== Background ==
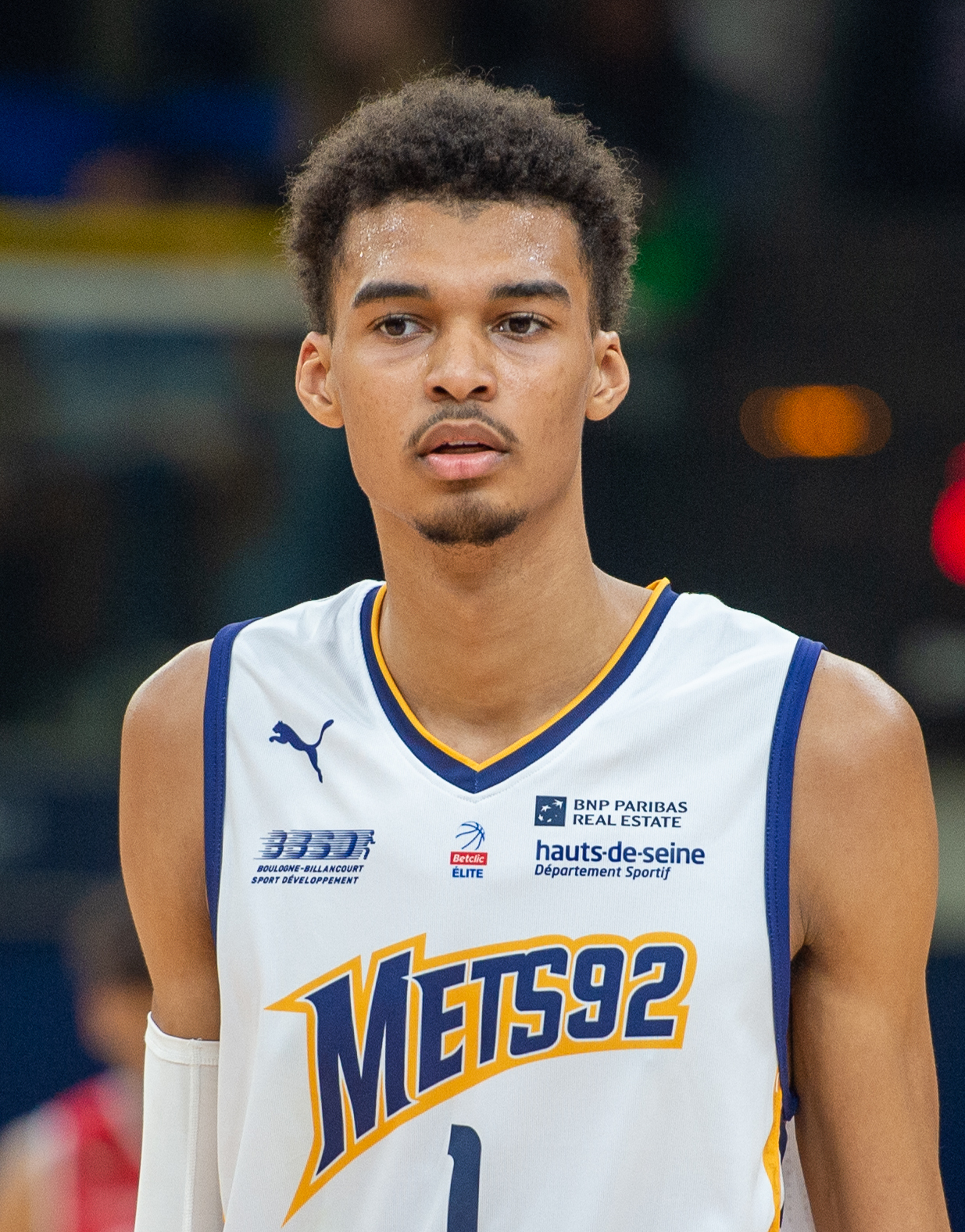
Victor Wembanyama in 2022

On September 9, 2022, the NBA announced two exhibition games between the NBA G League Ignite, a developmental team in the NBA G League, and Metropolitans 92 of the LNB Pro A, the top-tier French league. The games were held at the Ignite's home arena, the Dollar Loan Center in Henderson, Nevada, on October 4 and October 6, 2022. Metropolitans played three Pro A games before traveling to the United States on October 1. Their game against Chorale Roanne was postponed to December 6, in agreement with the league and their opponent, so that they could participate in the series. The Ignite were scheduled to begin their regular season on November 4.

Metropolitans was led by head coach Vincent Collet and power forward Victor Wembanyama, who was widely expected to be the first overall pick in the 2023 NBA draft, with many analysts considering him a once-in-a-generation prospect. Wembanyama was in his first season with the team, which also included former NBA player Tremont Waters. The Ignite, under head coach Jason Hart, were led by point guard Scoot Henderson, the projected second pick in the draft, who was entering his second season with his team. The team had other draft prospects, including Leonard Miller and Sidy Cissoko, as well as veterans like former NBA player John Jenkins.

The games marked Wembanyama's debut in the United States and the first meeting between him and Henderson. Sports Illustrated described it as the most anticipated prospect matchup of the season. Entering the first game of the series, Wembanyama called it the biggest game of his life. Analysts viewed it as Henderson's best opportunity to gain consideration as the top prospect in the draft.

== Game summaries ==
The series was scheduled for 7 p.m. PST on October 4 and 12 p.m. PST on October 6, 2022. Games were broadcast on ESPN2 and the NBA App, with Cory Alexander and John Schriffen as commentators. Agon Abazi, Julian McFadden and Catherine Chang served as referees for both games. The series was attended by more than 200 NBA executives and scouts, with representatives from all 30 NBA teams, and journalists from France, Canada and Brazil. NBA players Chris Paul, Devin Booker, DeMarcus Cousins, Trevor Ariza, Damion Lee and Duane Washington Jr., and WNBA players A'ja Wilson and Chelsea Gray, were in attendance for Game 1. NBA players Rudy Gobert and D'Angelo Russell attended Game 2.

=== Game 1 ===
October 4, 2022	Metropolitans 92 (France)	115–122 (Series: 0–1)	(United States) NBA G League Ignite	Henderson, Nevada
7 p.m. PST	Scoring by quarter: 24–30, 28–41, 36–20, 27–31
ESPN2	Pts: Victor Wembanyama 37; Rebs: Lahaou Konaté 7 Asts: Tremont Waters 9	Box score	Pts: Scoot Henderson 28; Rebs: Leonard Miller 8 Asts: Scoot Henderson 9	Arena: Dollar Loan Center; Referees: Agon Abazi, Julian McFadden, Catherine Chang

Starters:			Pts	Reb	Ast
G	51	(Puerto Rico) Tremont Waters	18	4	9
G	5	(France) Lahaou Konaté	0	7	3
F	11	(United States) Aaron Henry	7	3	3
F	28	(Senegal) Ibrahima Fall Faye	11	6	1
C	1	(France) Victor Wembanyama	37	4	0
Reserves:					
	10	(France) Bandja Sy	10	4	1
	3	(United States) DeVante' Jones	4	3	6
	25	(France) Hugo Besson	18	3	0
	15	(France) Steeve Ho You Fat	6	1	0
	35	(France) Armel Traoré	4	1	0
	0	(France) Bilal Coulibaly	0	0	0
	14	(Senegal) Idrissa Ba	DNP		
Head coach:
(French Federation of Basketball) Vincent Collet

Metropolitans 92	NBA G League Ignite

Metropolitans	Statistics	G League Ignite
39/74 (52.7%)	Field goals	44/93 (47.3%)
14/30 (46.7%)	3-pt field goals	13/38 (34.2%)
23/31 (74.2%)	Free throws	21/26 (80.8%)
6	Offensive rebounds	13
30	Defensive rebounds	22
36	Total rebounds	35
23	Assists	31
18	Turnovers	7
6	Steals	11
8	Blocks	5
20	Personal fouls	25

Starters:			Pts	Reb	Ast
G	0	(United States) Scoot Henderson	28	5	9
G	23	(United States) John Jenkins	21	3	4
F	25	(France) Sidy Cissoko	7	4	2
F	11	(Canada) Leonard Miller	8	8	2
C	12	(United States) Eric Mika	14	6	4
Reserves:					
	24	(United States) Aubrey Dawkins	15	3	2
	1	(United States) Cameron Young	4	2	1
	3	(United States) Marcus Graves	3	0	6
	7	(New Zealand) Mojave King	8	1	0
	10	(Nigeria) Efe Abogidi	14	3	0
	31	(United States) James Southerland	0	0	0
	5	(Ukraine) Pooh Jeter	0	0	1
	2	(United States) London Johnson	DNP		
	8	(United States) Shareef O'Neal	DNP		
Head coach:
(USA Basketball) Jason Hart

=== Game 2 ===
October 6, 2022	Metropolitans 92 (France)	112–106 (Series: 1–1)	(United States) NBA G League Ignite	Henderson, Nevada
12 p.m. PST	Scoring by quarter: 25–21, 30–35, 19–30, 38–20
ESPN2	Pts: Victor Wembanyama 36; Rebs: Victor Wembanyama 11; Asts: 4 players tied 4	Box score	Pts: Aubrey Dawkins 19; Rebs: Leonard Miller 9 Asts: Marcus Graves 7	Arena: Dollar Loan Center; Referees: Agon Abazi, Julian McFadden, Catherine Chang

Starters:			Pts	Reb	Ast
G	51	(Puerto Rico) Tremont Waters	15	3	4
G	5	(France) Lahaou Konaté	2	3	0
F	11	(United States) Aaron Henry	24	10	1
F	28	(Senegal) Ibrahima Fall Faye	6	4	4
C	1	(France) Victor Wembanyama	36	11	4
Reserves:					
	3	(United States) DeVante' Jones	4	1	3
	10	(France) Bandja Sy	12	4	1
	25	(France) Hugo Besson	5	2	4
	35	(France) Armel Traoré	2	1	4
	15	(France) Steeve Ho You Fat	4	1	0
	0	(France) Bilal Coulibaly	2	2	0
	14	(Senegal) Idrissa Ba	DNP		
Head coach:
(French Federation of Basketball) Vincent Collet

Metropolitans 92	NBA G League Ignite

Metropolitans	Statistics	G League Ignite
39/81 (48.1%)	Field goals	39/87 (44.8%)
6/28 (21.4%)	3-pt field goals	12/34 (35.3%)
28/36 (77.8%)	Free throws	16/18 (88.9%)
10	Offensive rebounds	11
32	Defensive rebounds	28
42	Total rebounds	39
21	Assists	28
12	Turnovers	14
12	Steals	6
7	Blocks	2
21	Personal fouls	25

Starters:			Pts	Reb	Ast
G	0	(United States) Scoot Henderson	0	1	1
G	23	(United States) John Jenkins	8	0	4
F	25	(France) Sidy Cissoko	2	1	3
F	11	(Canada) Leonard Miller	16	9	3
C	12	(United States) Eric Mika	6	6	3
Reserves:					
	5	(Ukraine) Pooh Jeter	2	2	2
	10	(Nigeria) Efe Abogidi	2	1	0
	24	(United States) Aubrey Dawkins	19	2	2
	8	(United States) Shareef O'Neal	8	3	0
	7	(New Zealand) Mojave King	15	5	2
	1	(United States) Cameron Young	13	3	1
	3	(United States) Marcus Graves	15	6	7
	2	(United States) London Johnson	DNP		
	31	(United States) James Southerland	DNP		
Head coach:
(USA Basketball) Jason Hart

== Reaction ==
The performances of Wembanyama and Henderson received praise from NBA analysts and players. Wembanyama was called a "generational talent" by LeBron James and a "2K create a player" by Stephen Curry. The Athletic writer Sam Vecenie described Game 1 as the "best NBA draft prospect game of the century." The game drew comparisons to matchups between Magic Johnson and Larry Bird in the 1979 NCAA Division I basketball championship game, and between LeBron James and Carmelo Anthony in high school in 2002.

Analysts speculated that the success of Wembanyama and Henderson would influence teams to tank for the 2023 NBA draft. Wembanyama was advised by NBA executives to sit out until the draft but his agent said that he would continue playing.

In December 2022, Game 1 of the series was featured in the first episode of The Break, an eight-part docuseries produced by the NBA G League in partnership with The General. The episode was narrated by Shaquille O'Neal and included behind-the-scenes footage of the game.

== Aftermath ==
Months following the Metropolitans 92 Vs. NBA G League Ignite exhibition series, Metropolitans center Victor Wembanyama would ultimately secure his position as the #1 pick of the 2023 NBA draft, being taken by the San Antonio Spurs that year and later winning the 2024 NBA Rookie of the Year Award while also leading the NBA in blocks per game that same season. The G League Ignite's biggest star, Scoot Henderson, on the other hand, would see his draft stock fall from a projected #2 pick to become the #3 pick of the 2023 draft instead, being taken by the Portland Trail Blazers that year. In addition to those two, the Metropolitans would also see forward Bilal Coulibaly be selected as the #7 pick of the 2023 draft by the Indiana Pacers (though being traded to the Washington Wizards in an eventual three-team trade with the Phoenix Suns), while the Ignite would also see Leonard Miller, French player Sidy Cissoko, and Mojave King all get drafted in the second round of the 2023 draft. Metropolitans player Steeve Ho You Fat would also gain notable intrigue by fans outside of France due to his interesting surname. Alongside Victor Wembanyama, Steeve Ho You Fat's jersey would also see notable increased sales for the Metropolitans following the exhibition games, with his surname giving off similar vibes to Rod Smart's "He Hate Me" name from the original XFL.

The NBA G League Ignite would later play for one more season following these exhibition games before ultimately being shut down on March 28, 2024, due to the changing landscape for student-athletes seeing more favorable results for them via student athlete compensation being more heavily implemented in the NCAA. The NBA G League Ignite would finish their franchise with the worst record in G League history with a 2–32 record, tying the lowest number of wins with the 2021 Iowa Wolves in a COVID-19 pandemic shortened season (though they also got a 4–12 record in the Showcase Cup that was played earlier in the season). The Metropolitans 92 wouldn't fare much better in their following season without Wembanyama and Coulibaly, as they would finish their 2023–24 season in the since rebranded LNB Élite with the worst record in the league at 4–30. Even worse for them, following their planned relegation to the LNB Pro B, in May 2024, the Metropolitans 92 announced that they were bankrupt due to the Boulogne-Billancourt municipality cutting funding for the team and being unable to find a new owner for the team afterward. However, rather than fold their own squad similar to the Ignite, the Metropolitans 92 decided to further demote their squad down to the Nationale Masculine 1 (the third-best French basketball league) in order to help restructure themselves going forward into the 2024–25 season.
