= 2023 NBA All-Star Game =

Exhibition basketball game

	1	2	3	4	Total
Team Giannis	46	53	59	26	184
Team LeBron	46	46	49	34	175
- Date: February 19, 2023
- Arena: Vivint Arena
- City: Salt Lake City
- MVP: Jayson Tatum (Team Giannis)
- National anthem: Jully Black (Canadian); Jewel (American)
- Halftime show: Burna Boy, Tems, and Rema
- Attendance: 17,886
- Network: TNT; TBS (as all-star game)
- Announcers: Brian Anderson, Reggie Miller, Candace Parker, and Dennis Scott (All-Star Game, TNT); Ernie Johnson, Shaquille O'Neal, Kenny Smith, Charles Barkley, and Draymond Green (Inside the All-Star Game, TBS); Kevin Harlan, Reggie Miller, Draymond Green, Kenny Smith, Shaquille O'Neal, and Adam Lefkoe (All-Star Saturday Night); Adam Lefkoe, Jamal Crawford, Candace Parker, and Stephanie Ready (Rising Stars Tournament)

NBA All-Star Game
< 2022	2024 >

The 2023 NBA All-Star Game was an exhibition game played on February 19, 2023, during the National Basketball Association's 2022–23 season, held on the 30th anniversary of the first All-Star Game held in Salt Lake City in 1993. It was the 72nd edition of the event. The game was hosted by the Utah Jazz at Vivint Arena (later Delta Center), and was televised nationally by TNT for the 21st consecutive year.

The announcement of the site selection was made on October 23, 2019, at a press conference held by the NBA and the Jazz.

Team Giannis defeated Team LeBron 184–175. It was Team Giannis' first All-Star Game victory, handing Team LeBron their first (and only) loss in such game. Jayson Tatum scored an All-Star Game record 55 points, and was named All-Star Game MVP. This also marked the last NBA All-Star Game using the format with the team captains' names on their teams, as the NBA announced the return to the East vs. West format in October 2023.

Candace Parker became the first woman color commentator for any NBA All-Star Game with this game.

== All-Star Game ==
=== Coaches ===
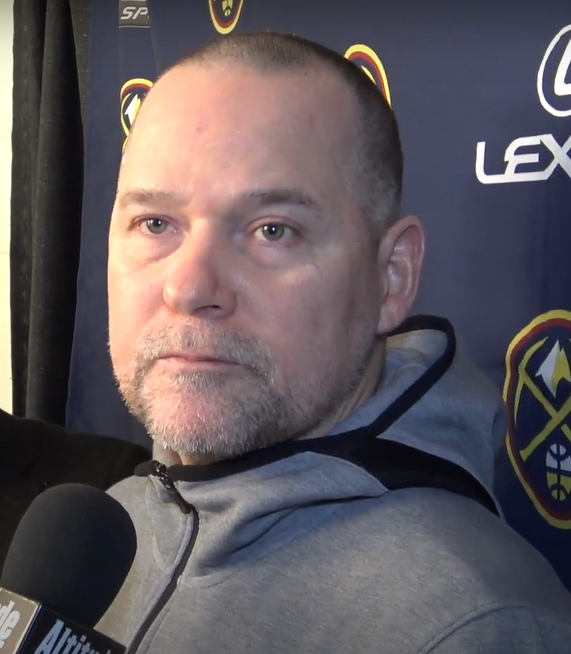
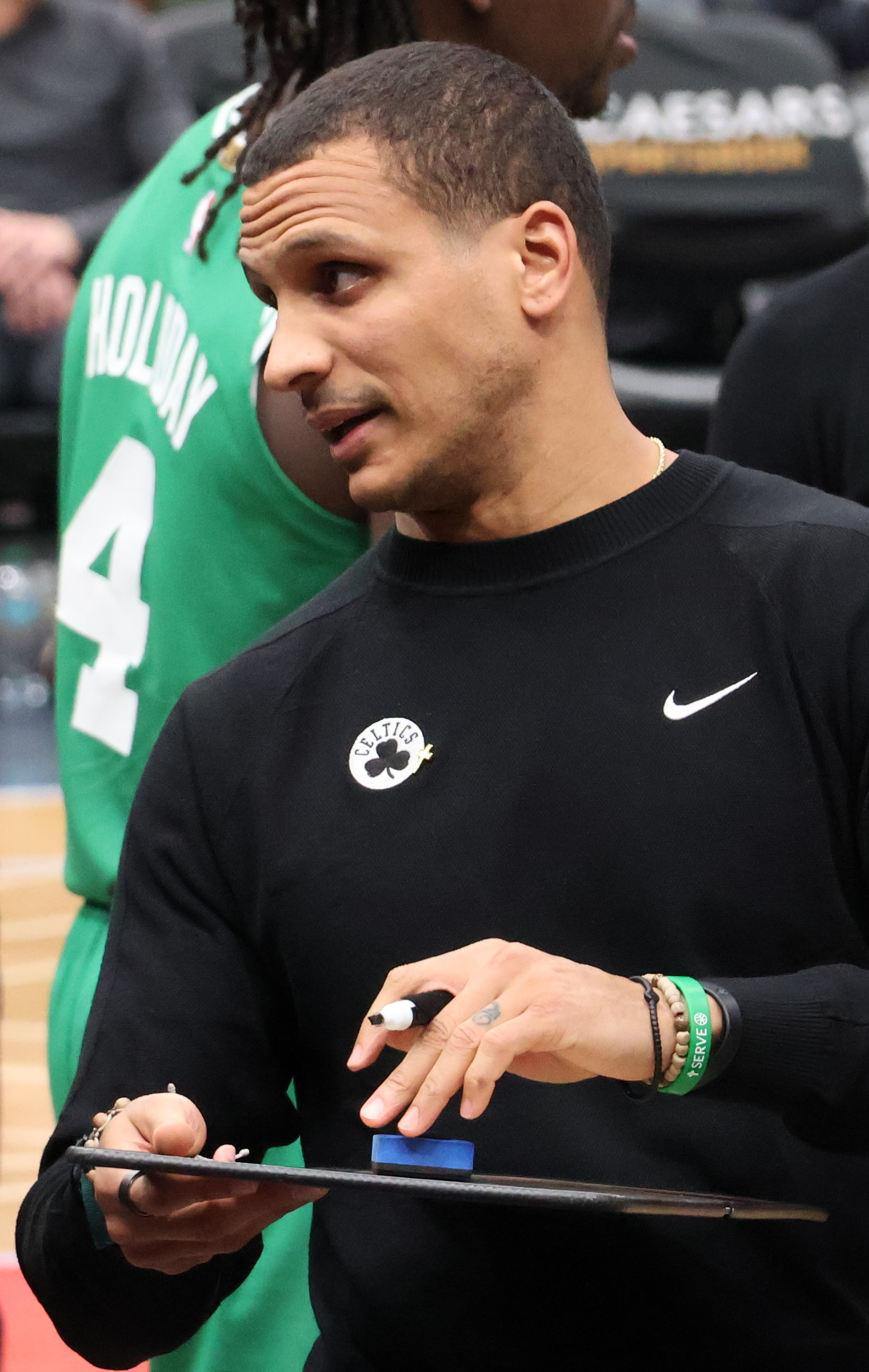
Denver Nuggets' Michael Malone (left) and Boston Celtics' Joe Mazzulla (right) were selected as head coach for Team LeBron and Team Giannis, respectively.

The two teams were coached from their team captain's respective conference. Joe Mazzulla, interim head coach of the Eastern Conference leader Boston Celtics, qualified as the head coach of Team Giannis on January 30. Michael Malone, head coach of the Western Conference leader Denver Nuggets, qualified as the head coach of Team LeBron on February 1.

=== Rosters ===
As had been the case in previous years, the rosters for the All-Star Game were selected through a voting process. The fans could vote through the NBA website as well as through their Google account. The starters were chosen by the fans, media, and current NBA players. Fans made up 50% of the vote, and NBA players and media each comprised 25% of the vote. The two guards and three frontcourt players who received the highest cumulative vote totals in each conferences were named the All-Star starters and two players in each conferences with the highest votes were named team captains. NBA head coaches voted for the reserves for their respective conferences, none of which could be players from their own team. Each coach selected two guards, three frontcourt players and two wild cards, with each selected player ranked in order of preference within each category. If a multi-position player was to be selected, coaches were encouraged to vote for the player at the position that was "most advantageous for the All-Star team", regardless of where the player was listed on the All-Star ballot or the position he was listed in box scores.

The All-Star Game starters were announced on January 26, 2023. Kyrie Irving of Brooklyn Nets (who was traded to the Dallas Mavericks on February 6) and Donovan Mitchell of the Cleveland Cavaliers were announced as of the starting guards for the East, earning their eighth and fourth all-star appearances respectively. Jayson Tatum of the Boston Celtics and Kevin Durant of the Brooklyn Nets (who was traded to the Phoenix Suns on February 8) were named the frontcourt starters in the East, earning their fourth and 13th all-star appearances, respectively. Joining the East frontcourt was Giannis Antetokounmpo of the Milwaukee Bucks, his seventh all-star selection. Durant and Irving's trades to West teams means that only 3 of the 5 East starters will be representing East teams at the time of the ASG.

Additionally, Stephen Curry of the Golden State Warriors and Luka Dončić of the Dallas Mavericks were named to the starting backcourt in the West, earning their ninth and fourth all-star appearances respectively. In the frontcourt, LeBron James of the Los Angeles Lakers earned his 19th all-star appearance, tying Kareem Abdul-Jabbar for most appearances in NBA history. Joining James in the frontcourt were Zion Williamson of the New Orleans Pelicans and Nikola Jokić of the Denver Nuggets, earning their second and fifth all-star appearances, respectively.

The All-Star Game reserves were announced on February 2, 2023. The West reserves included Paul George of the Los Angeles Clippers, his eighth selection; Shai Gilgeous-Alexander of the Oklahoma City Thunder, his first selection; Jaren Jackson Jr. of the Memphis Grizzlies, his first selection; Damian Lillard of the Portland Trail Blazers, his seventh selection; Lauri Markkanen of the Utah Jazz, his first selection; Ja Morant of the Memphis Grizzlies, his second selection; and Domantas Sabonis of the Sacramento Kings, his third selection.

The East reserves included Bam Adebayo of the Miami Heat, his second selection; Jaylen Brown of the Boston Celtics, his second selection; DeMar DeRozan of the Chicago Bulls, his sixth selection; Joel Embiid of the Philadelphia 76ers, his sixth selection; Tyrese Haliburton of the Indiana Pacers, his first selection; Jrue Holiday of the Milwaukee Bucks, his second selection; and Julius Randle of the New York Knicks, his second selection.

After injuries were reported from Stephen Curry, Kevin Durant, and Zion Williamson, the NBA announced that Anthony Edwards of the Minnesota Timberwolves, Pascal Siakam of the Toronto Raptors, and De'Aaron Fox of the Sacramento Kings would replace them as participants in the all-star game.

Eastern Conference All-Stars
Pos	Player	Team	No. of selections
Starters
G	Kyrie Irving	Dallas Mavericks^{NOTE1}	8
G	Donovan Mitchell	Cleveland Cavaliers	4
F	Giannis Antetokounmpo	Milwaukee Bucks	7
F	Kevin Durant^{INJ2}	Phoenix Suns^{NOTE2}	13
F	Jayson Tatum	Boston Celtics	4
Reserves
G	Jaylen Brown	Boston Celtics	2
G	DeMar DeRozan	Chicago Bulls	6
G	Tyrese Haliburton	Indiana Pacers	1
G	Jrue Holiday	Milwaukee Bucks	2
F	Julius Randle	New York Knicks	2
C	Bam Adebayo	Miami Heat	2
C	Joel Embiid^{ST1}	Philadelphia 76ers	6
F	Pascal Siakam^{REP1}	Toronto Raptors	2

Western Conference All-Stars
Pos	Player	Team	No. of selections
Starters
G	Stephen Curry^{INJ1}	Golden State Warriors	9
G	Luka Dončić	Dallas Mavericks	4
C	Nikola Jokić	Denver Nuggets	5
F	LeBron James	Los Angeles Lakers	19
F	Zion Williamson^{INJ3}	New Orleans Pelicans	2
Reserves
G	Shai Gilgeous-Alexander	Oklahoma City Thunder	1
G	Damian Lillard	Portland Trail Blazers	7
G	Ja Morant^{ST2}	Memphis Grizzlies	2
F	Paul George	Los Angeles Clippers	8
F	Jaren Jackson Jr.	Memphis Grizzlies	1
F	Lauri Markkanen^{ST3}	Utah Jazz	1
C	Domantas Sabonis	Sacramento Kings	3
G	Anthony Edwards^{REP2}	Minnesota Timberwolves	1
G	De'Aaron Fox^{REP3}	Sacramento Kings	1

Notes

Italics indicates leading vote-getters per conference.

^INJ1 Stephen Curry was unable to play due to a leg injury.
^INJ2 Kevin Durant was unable to play due to a knee injury.
^INJ3 Zion Williamson was unable to play due to a hamstring injury.
^REP1 Pascal Siakam was selected as Kevin Durant's replacement.
^REP2 Anthony Edwards was selected as Zion Williamson's replacement.
^REP3 De'Aaron Fox was selected as Stephen Curry's replacement.
^ST1 Joel Embiid was selected to start in place of Kevin Durant.
^ST2 Ja Morant was selected to start in place of Stephen Curry.
^ST3 Lauri Markkanen was selected to start in place of Zion Williamson.
^NOTE1 After being announced as an Eastern Conference All-Star, Kyrie Irving was traded from the Brooklyn Nets to the Dallas Mavericks of the Western Conference.
^NOTE2 After being announced as an Eastern Conference All-Star, Kevin Durant was traded from the Brooklyn Nets to the Phoenix Suns of the Western Conference.

=== Draft ===
The NBA All-Star draft started at 7:30 p.m. ET (TNT/TBS) on Sunday, Feb. 19. The All-Star draft took place right before the game. LeBron James and Giannis Antetokounmpo were named captains as they both received the most votes from the West and East, respectively. Giannis selected the first reserve player and alternated picks until each bench is filled. James had the first selection of the starters as he has had the most votes overall in the balloting process. The first eight players to be drafted will be starters. The next 14 players (seven from each conference) will be chosen by NBA head coaches. NBA Commissioner Adam Silver will select replacements for any player unable to participate in the All-Star Game, choosing a player from the same conference as the player who was being replaced. His selection will join the team that drafted the replaced player. If a replaced player is a starter, the head coach of that team will choose a new starter from their cast of players instead.

2023 All-Star Draft
Pick	Player	Team
1	Damian Lillard	Giannis
2	Anthony Edwards	LeBron
3	Jrue Holiday	Giannis
4	Jaylen Brown	LeBron
5	Shai Gilgeous-Alexander	Giannis
6	Paul George	LeBron
7	DeMar DeRozan	Giannis
8	Tyrese Haliburton	LeBron
9	Pascal Siakam	Giannis
10	Julius Randle	LeBron
11	Bam Adebayo	Giannis
12	De'Aaron Fox	LeBron
13	Domantas Sabonis	Giannis
14	Jaren Jackson Jr.	LeBron
15	Joel Embiid	LeBron
16	Jayson Tatum	Giannis
17	Kyrie Irving	LeBron
18	Ja Morant	Giannis
19	Luka Dončić	LeBron
20	Donovan Mitchell	Giannis
21	Nikola Jokić	LeBron
22	Lauri Markkanen	Giannis

=== Lineups ===
Team LeBron
Pos	Player	Team
Starters
F	LeBron James	Los Angeles Lakers
C	Nikola Jokić	Denver Nuggets
C	Joel Embiid	Philadelphia 76ers
G	Kyrie Irving	Dallas Mavericks
G	Luka Dončić	Dallas Mavericks
Reserves
F	Anthony Edwards	Minnesota Timberwolves
G	Jaylen Brown	Boston Celtics
F	Paul George	Los Angeles Clippers
G	Tyrese Haliburton	Indiana Pacers
F	Julius Randle	New York Knicks
G	De'Aaron Fox	Sacramento Kings
F	Jaren Jackson Jr.	Memphis Grizzlies
Head coach: Michael Malone (Denver Nuggets)

Team Giannis
Pos	Player	Team
Starters
F	Lauri Markkanen	Utah Jazz
F	Jayson Tatum	Boston Celtics
F	Giannis Antetokounmpo	Milwaukee Bucks
G	Ja Morant	Memphis Grizzlies
G	Donovan Mitchell	Cleveland Cavaliers
Reserves
G	Damian Lillard	Portland Trail Blazers
G	Jrue Holiday	Milwaukee Bucks
G	Shai Gilgeous-Alexander	Oklahoma City Thunder
G	DeMar DeRozan	Chicago Bulls
F	Pascal Siakam	Toronto Raptors
C	Bam Adebayo	Miami Heat
C	Domantas Sabonis	Sacramento Kings
Head coach: Joe Mazzulla (Boston Celtics)

=== Game ===
The 2023 All-Star Game used the same format as the 2020 edition; the team that scores the most points during each of the first three 12-minute quarters will receive a cash prize, which will be donated to a designated charity. The pot will roll over if the teams are tied. The fourth quarter will be untimed, with the first team to meet or exceed a "target score"—the score of the leading team in total scoring after three quarters plus 24—declared the winner. The "target score" in this game was 182, since Team Giannis was leading 158–141 at the end of the third quarter.

Team Giannis defeated Team LeBron 184–175. It was Team Giannis' first (and only) win, and Team LeBron's first (and only) defeat. It was also the first (and only) time in All-Star Game history that the target score was exceeded since the format was changed in 2020. Jayson Tatum, who scored a record-breaking 55 points, was named All-Star Game MVP. His 55 points surpassed Anthony Davis' record of 52 points in 2017. Damian Lillard scored the game-winning 3-pointer to give Team Giannis their first victory in NBA All-Star history.

This also marked the last time the NBA used the drafted teams format, which has been used since 2018. The NBA All-Star Game returned to its traditional East vs. West format the following year in 2024.

TNT, TBS

February 19, 2023
8:00 pm ET

Recap

Team Giannis 184, Team LeBron 175
Scoring by quarter: 46–46, 53–46, 59–49, 26–34
Pts: Jayson Tatum 55; Rebs: Jayson Tatum 10; Asts: Donovan Mitchell 10	Pts: Jaylen Brown 35; Rebs: Jaylen Brown 14; Asts: Kyrie Irving 15

Vivint Arena, Salt Lake City, Utah
Attendance: 17,886
Referees:
- #30 John Goble
- #29 Mark Lindsay
- #38 Michael Smith

== All-Star Weekend ==
=== Celebrity Game ===
The 2023 NBA All-Star Celebrity Game was played on Friday, February 17, 2023, at the Jon M. Huntsman Center in Salt Lake City, Utah. The captains for the 2023 were Utah Jazz team governor Ryan Smith and NBA legend and Jazz minority owner Dwyane Wade.

The game featured several new features and rules; a four-point field goal line was added, and the coaches could each activate a two-minute "Crunch Time" period in which all points are doubled. The game ended with an attempted half-court buzzer beater that went into the bucket by The Miz, which would've won the game as a four-point field goal; it was, however, the field goal was disallowed as it was shot slightly after the buzzer.

ESPN

February 17, 2023
7:00 pm ET

Team Ryan 78, Team Dwyane 81

Jon M. Huntsman Center, Salt Lake City, Utah

Team Ryan
Player	Background
Kane Brown (3)	5x AMA award-winning artist
Cordae	Rapper, recording artist
Diamond DeShields	WNBA player
Calvin Johnson	Former NFL player
Marcos Mion	TV host
The Miz	Professional wrestler
Albert Pujols	Former MLB player
Everett Osborne	Actor
Ozuna	Rapper, recording artist
Guillermo Rodriguez	ABC's Jimmy Kimmel Live correspondent
Sinqua Walls	Actor
Honorary Captain: Ryan Smith (Utah Jazz governor)
Head coach: Lisa Leslie (former WNBA player)
Assistant coach: Fat Joe (rapper and actor)
Assistant coach: Alex Bregman (MLB player)

Team Dwyane
Player	Background
Nicky Jam	Latin global music icon and actor
Jesser	YouTuber
Simu Liu	Actor
Hasan Minhaj (3)	Comedian
DK Metcalf	NFL player
Janelle Monáe	Actress, singer, songwriter
Arike Ogunbowale	WNBA player
21 Savage	Rapper, recording artist
Ranveer Singh (2)	Actor
Frances Tiafoe	Tennis player
Alex Toussaint (2)	Athlete
Honorary Captain: Dwyane Wade (Utah Jazz minority owner and NBA legend)
Head coach: Giannis Antetokounmpo (NBA player)
Assistant coach: Alex Antetokounmpo (NBA G League player)
Assistant coach: Thanasis Antetokounmpo (NBA player)
Assistant coach: Lindsey Vonn (3x Olympic-medalist skier)

=== Rising Stars Challenge ===
Team Pau
Pos.	Player	Team	R/S/P
G	Jose Alvarado	New Orleans Pelicans	Sophomore
F	Paolo Banchero	Orlando Magic	Rookie
F	Scottie Barnes	Toronto Raptors	Sophomore
G	Jaden Ivey	Detroit Pistons	Rookie
G	Bennedict Mathurin	Indiana Pacers	Rookie
F	Keegan Murray	Sacramento Kings	Rookie
G	Andrew Nembhard	Indiana Pacers	Rookie
Honorary coach: Pau Gasol
Head coach: David Adelman

Team Joakim
Pos.	Player	Team	R/S/P
C	Jalen Duren^{INJ1}	Detroit Pistons	Rookie
F	Tari Eason^{REP1}	Houston Rockets	Rookie
G	Josh Giddey	Oklahoma City Thunder	Sophomore
G	Quentin Grimes	New York Knicks	Sophomore
F	Evan Mobley	Cleveland Cavaliers	Sophomore
F	Jabari Smith Jr.	Houston Rockets	Rookie
F	Jeremy Sochan	San Antonio Spurs	Rookie
G	Jalen Williams	Oklahoma City Thunder	Rookie
Honorary coach: Joakim Noah
Head coach: Ben Sullivan

Team Deron
Pos.	Player	Team	R/S/P
G	Ayo Dosunmu^{REP2}	Chicago Bulls	Sophomore
G	Jalen Green^{INJ2}	Houston Rockets	Sophomore
G	AJ Griffin	Atlanta Hawks	Rookie
G	Bones Hyland	Los Angeles Clippers	Sophomore
C	Walker Kessler	Utah Jazz	Rookie
F	Trey Murphy III	New Orleans Pelicans	Sophomore
C	Alperen Şengün	Houston Rockets	Sophomore
F	Franz Wagner	Orlando Magic	Sophomore
Honorary coach: Deron Williams
Head coach: Damon Stoudamire

Team Jason
Pos.	Player	Team	R/S/P
G	Sidy Cissoko	G League Ignite	Prospect
G	Scoot Henderson	G League Ignite	Prospect
F	Mojave King	G League Ignite	Prospect
F	Kenneth Lofton Jr.	Memphis Hustle	Rookie
G	Mac McClung	Philadelphia 76ers	Sophomore
F	Leonard Miller	G League Ignite	Prospect
G	Scotty Pippen Jr.	South Bay Lakers	Rookie
Honorary coach: Jason Terry
Head coach: Ryan Saunders

^INJ1 Jalen Duren was unable to participate due to injury.
^REP1 Tari Eason was selected as Jalen Duren's replacement.
^INJ2 Jalen Green was unable to participate due to injury.
^REP2 Ayo Dosunmu was selected as Jalen Green's replacement.

Semifinals
Team Pau	40
Team Deron	25
Team Joakim	40
Team Jason	32

Final
Team Pau	25
Team Joakim	20

=== Skills Challenge ===
Team Rooks
Pos.	Player	Team
F	Paolo Banchero	Orlando Magic
G	Jaden Ivey	Detroit Pistons
F	Jabari Smith Jr.	Houston Rockets

Team Jazz
Pos.	Player	Team
G	Jordan Clarkson	Utah Jazz
C	Walker Kessler	Utah Jazz
G	Collin Sexton	Utah Jazz

Team Antetokounmpos
Pos.	Player	Team
F	Giannis Antetokounmpo^{INJ3}	Milwaukee Bucks
F	Alex Antetokounmpo	Wisconsin Herd
F	Thanasis Antetokounmpo	Milwaukee Bucks
G	Jrue Holiday^{REP3}	Milwaukee Bucks

^INJ3 Giannis Antetokounmpo was unable to play due to a wrist injury.
^REP3 Jrue Holiday was selected to play instead of Antetokoumnpo.

=== Three Point Contest ===
Contestants
Pos.	Player	Team	Height	Weight	First round	Final round
G	Damian Lillard	Portland Trail Blazers	6–2	195	26	26
G	Buddy Hield	Indiana Pacers	6–4	220	23	25
G	Tyrese Haliburton	Indiana Pacers	6–5	185	31	17
F	Lauri Markkanen	Utah Jazz	7–0	240	20	DNQ
F	Jayson Tatum	Boston Celtics	6–8	210	20	DNQ
G	Tyler Herro	Miami Heat	6–5	195	18	DNQ
F	Julius Randle^{REP1}	New York Knicks	6–8	250	13	DNQ
G	Kevin Huerter	Sacramento Kings	6–7	198	8	DNQ
G	Anfernee Simons^{INJ1}	Portland Trail Blazers	6–3	181	DNP	

^INJ1 Anfernee Simons was unable to play due to an ankle injury.
^REP1 Julius Randle was selected as Anfernee Simons' replacement.

=== Slam Dunk Contest ===
Contestants
Pos.	Player	Team	Height	Weight	First round	Final round
G	Mac McClung	Philadelphia 76ers	6–2	185	99.8 (50+49.8)	100 (50+50)
F	Trey Murphy III	New Orleans Pelicans	6–8	206	96 (46.6+49.4)	98 (48.8+49.2)
C	Jericho Sims^{REP1}	New York Knicks	6–10	250	95.4 (47.6+47.8)	DNQ
F	Kenyon Martin Jr.	Houston Rockets	6–7	216	93.2 (46+47.2)	DNQ
G	Shaedon Sharpe^{WD1}	Portland Trail Blazers	6–5	200	DNP	

^WD1 Shaedon Sharpe withdrew from the competition focusing on the rest of the regular season.
^REP1 Jericho Sims was selected as Shaedon Sharpe's replacement.
