= 2025–26 Portland Trail Blazers season =

- Head coach: Chauncey Billups (on leave); Tiago Splitter (acting) (Note: On October 23, 2025, Chauncey Billups was arrested for alleged involvement in an illegal gambling scheme and was placed on leave by the NBA. He was replaced by Tiago Splitter as the interim head coach.)
- President: Dewayne Hankins
- General manager: Joe Cronin
- Owner: Jody Allen
- Arena: Moda Center

Results
- Record: 42–40 (.512)
- Place: Division: 4th (Northwest); Conference: 8th (Western)
- Playoff finish: First round (lost to Spurs 1–4)
- Stats at Basketball Reference

Local media
- Television: Rip City Television Network (Note: Affiliates include: KUNP/KATU-DT2 (Portland); KVAL-DT2 (Eugene); KCBY-DT2 (Coos Bay); KPIC-DT2 (Roseburg); KTVL-DT3 (Medford); KUNS-TV/KSTW (Seattle); KIMA-DT3 (Yakima); KEPR-DT3 (Pasco); KXLY-TV/KXLY-DT2/KXLY-DT3 (Spokane); KOHD-DT2 (Bend)); BlazerVision
- Radio: KPOJ

The 2025–26 Portland Trail Blazers season was the 56th season of the franchise in the National Basketball Association (NBA). On July 19, 2025, former All-Star Damian Lillard signed a three-year deal with the Trail Blazers for his second stint with the team. However, he would miss the entire season while recovering from a torn left Achilles tendon. The team also updated both their white "Association" and black "Icon" uniforms by eliminating the silver accents and the contrasting neck and armhole striping.

On October 23, 2025, head coach Chauncey Billups was arrested for alleged involvement in an illegal gambling scheme and was placed on leave by the NBA. He was replaced by Tiago Splitter on interim basis. Deni Avdija was named an All-Star for the first time in his career, while Damian Lillard won the Three-Point Contest at the All-Star Weekend.

With their win against the Milwaukee Bucks on March 25, the Trail Blazers surpassed their win total from the previous season. On March 29, the Trail Blazers clinched a play-in spot. The team finished the regular season with a 42–40 record, placing eighth in the West as they also won the tiebreaker over the Los Angeles Clippers due to a better intra-conference record. Portland clinched their first playoff spot since 2021 with a win over the Phoenix Suns in the first stage of the play-in on April 14, securing the seventh seed. However, they lost in five games to the second-seeded San Antonio Spurs in the first round of the playoffs.

== Draft ==
Round	Pick	Player	Position	Nationality	College
1	11	Cedric Coward	Small Forward	United States	Washington State

The Trail Blazers entered the draft possessing only a single first-round selection. Their second-round pick was traded to the Sacramento Kings in 2020 and was ultimately used by the Toronto Raptors in the draft. The Trail Blazers used their only selection to draft Cedric Coward 11th overall, but soon traded him to the Memphis Grizzlies for the 16th pick Yang Hansen and three future draft picks.

== Roster ==
2025–26 Portland Trail Blazers roster
Players

Pos.	No.	Player	Height	Weight	DOB	From
F	8	Deni Avdija	6 ft 9 in (2.06 m)	240 lb (109 kg)	2001-01-03	Israel
F	33	Toumani Camara	6 ft 7 in (2.01 m)	229 lb (104 kg)	2000-05-08	Dayton
G	91	Sidy Cissoko	6 ft 6 in (1.98 m)	200 lb (91 kg)	2004-04-02	France
C	23	Donovan Clingan	7 ft 2 in (2.18 m)	280 lb (127 kg)	2004-02-23	Connecticut
F	9	Jerami Grant	6 ft 7 in (2.01 m)	210 lb (95 kg)	1994-03-12	Syracuse
G	00	Scoot Henderson	6 ft 3 in (1.91 m)	206 lb (93 kg)	2004-02-03	Carlton J. Kell HS (GA)
G	5	Jrue Holiday	6 ft 4 in (1.93 m)	185 lb (84 kg)	1990-06-12	UCLA
F	29	Jayson Kent (TW)	6 ft 8 in (2.03 m)	215 lb (98 kg)	2002-02-03	Texas
G	27	Vít Krejčí	6 ft 8 in (2.03 m)	195 lb (88 kg)	2000-06-19	Czech Republic
G	0	Damian Lillard (injured)	6 ft 2 in (1.88 m)	195 lb (88 kg)	1990-07-15	Weber State
G	2	Caleb Love (TW)	6 ft 4 in (1.93 m)	195 lb (88 kg)	2001-09-27	Arizona
F	24	Kris Murray	6 ft 8 in (2.03 m)	216 lb (98 kg)	2000-08-19	Iowa
G	17	Shaedon Sharpe	6 ft 5 in (1.96 m)	208 lb (94 kg)	2003-05-30	Dream City Christian (AZ)
G/F	4	Matisse Thybulle	6 ft 5 in (1.96 m)	201 lb (91 kg)	1997-03-04	Washington
F/C	35	Robert Williams III	6 ft 9 in (2.06 m)	249 lb (113 kg)	1997-10-17	Texas A&M
G	1	Blake Wesley	6 ft 3 in (1.91 m)	205 lb (93 kg)	2003-03-16	Notre Dame
C	16	Hansen Yang	7 ft 1 in (2.16 m)	249 lb (113 kg)	2005-06-26	China
G	11	Chris Youngblood (TW)	6 ft 4 in (1.93 m)	220 lb (100 kg)	2002-02-09	Alabama

Coaches
Head coach
- Chauncey Billups (on leave)
- Tiago Splitter (interim head coach)
Assistant(s)
- Nate Bjorkgren
- Ronnie Burrell
- Quinton Crawford
- Chris Fleming
- Jonah Herscu
- James Posey
- Roy Rogers
- Patrick St. Andrews
- Mark Tyndale

Legend
- (DP) Unsigned draft pick
- (FA) Free agent
- (S) Suspended
- (GL) On assignment to G League
- (TW) Two-way affiliate player
- Injured

Roster
Updated: March 3, 2026

== Standings ==
=== Division ===
Northwest Division	W	L	PCT	GB	Home	Road	Div	GP
z – Oklahoma City Thunder	64	18	.780	–	34‍–‍8	30‍–‍10	12‍–‍4	82
x – Denver Nuggets	54	28	.659	10.0	28‍–‍13	26‍–‍15	11‍–‍5	82
x – Minnesota Timberwolves	49	33	.598	15.0	26‍–‍15	23‍–‍18	9‍–‍7	82
x – Portland Trail Blazers	42	40	.512	22.0	24‍–‍17	18‍–‍23	7‍–‍9	82
Utah Jazz	22	60	.268	42.0	14‍–‍27	8‍–‍33	1‍–‍15	82

=== Conference ===
Western Conference
#	Team	W	L	PCT	GB	GP
1	z – Oklahoma City Thunder *	64	18	.780	–	82
2	y – San Antonio Spurs *	62	20	.756	2.0	82
3	x – Denver Nuggets	54	28	.659	10.0	82
4	y – Los Angeles Lakers *	53	29	.646	11.0	82
5	x – Houston Rockets	52	30	.634	12.0	82
6	x – Minnesota Timberwolves	49	33	.598	15.0	82
7	x – Phoenix Suns	45	37	.549	19.0	82
8	x – Portland Trail Blazers	42	40	.512	22.0	82
9	pi – Los Angeles Clippers	42	40	.512	22.0	82
10	pi – Golden State Warriors	37	45	.451	27.0	82
11	New Orleans Pelicans	26	56	.317	38.0	82
12	Dallas Mavericks	26	56	.317	38.0	82
13	Memphis Grizzlies	25	57	.305	39.0	82
14	Sacramento Kings	22	60	.268	42.0	82
15	Utah Jazz	22	60	.268	42.0	82

== Game log ==
=== Preseason ===
2025 preseason game log
Total: 1–3 (Home: 1–1; Road: 0–2)
Preseason: 1–3 (home: 1–1; road: 0–2)

Game	Date	Team	Score	High points	High rebounds	High assists	Location Attendance	Record
1	October 8	@ Golden State	L 123–129	Shaedon Sharpe (22)	Deni Avdija (8)	Jrue Holiday (7)	Chase Center; 18,064	0–1
2	October 10	Sacramento	W 124–123	Shaedon Sharpe (17)	Donovan Clingan (8)	Cissoko, Holiday (3)	Moda Center; 15,323	1–1
3	October 14	Golden State	L 111–118	Shaedon Sharpe (18)	Donovan Clingan (11)	Jrue Holiday (6)	Moda Center; 16,262	1–2
4	October 16	@ Utah	L 129–132	Jerami Grant (32)	Donovan Clingan (10)	Jrue Holiday (7)	Delta Center; 13,339	1–3

2025–26 preseason schedule

=== Regular season ===
2025–26 game log
Total: 42–40 (Home: 24–17; Road: 18–23)
October: 4–2 (home: 2–1; road: 2–1)

Game	Date	Team	Score	High points	High rebounds	High assists	Location Attendance	Record
1	October 22	Minnesota	L 114–118	Jerami Grant (29)	Toumani Camara (9)	Jrue Holiday (7)	Moda Center; 19,335	0–1
2	October 24	Golden State	W 139–119	Deni Avdija (26)	Donovan Clingan (8)	Jrue Holiday (11)	Moda Center; 18,090	1–1
3	October 26	@ L.A. Clippers	L 107–114	Deni Avdija (23)	Donovan Clingan (10)	Jrue Holiday (7)	Intuit Dome; 17,927	1–2
4	October 27	@ L.A. Lakers	W 122–108	Deni Avdija (25)	Donovan Clingan (14)	Jrue Holiday (6)	Crypto.com Arena; 18,512	2–2
5	October 29	@ Utah	W 136–134	Jrue Holiday (27)	Deni Avdija (9)	Jrue Holiday (8)	Delta Center; 18,186	3–2
6	October 31	Denver	W 109–107	Deni Avdija (23)	Donovan Clingan (15)	Jrue Holiday (13)	Moda Center; 16,382	4–2

November: 4–10 (home: 1–5; road: 3–5)

Game	Date	Team	Score	High points	High rebounds	High assists	Location Attendance	Record
7	November 3	L.A. Lakers	L 115–123	Deni Avdija (33)	Camara, Sharpe (7)	Jrue Holiday (6)	Moda Center; 17,083	4–3
8	November 5	Oklahoma City	W 121–119	Deni Avdija (26)	Deni Avdija (10)	Deni Avdija (9)	Moda Center; 16,822	5–3
9	November 8	@ Miami	L 131–136	Deni Avdija (33)	Deni Avdija (11)	Jrue Holiday (12)	Kaseya Center; 19,600	5–4
10	November 10	@ Orlando	L 112–115	Shaedon Sharpe (31)	Donovan Clingan (9)	Jrue Holiday (7)	Kia Center; 17,989	5–5
11	November 12	@ New Orleans	W 125–117	Shaedon Sharpe (35)	Donovan Clingan (11)	Jrue Holiday (12)	Smoothie King Center; 15,896	6–5
12	November 14	@ Houston	L 116–140	Deni Avdija (22)	Deni Avdija (10)	Jrue Holiday (6)	Toyota Center; 18,055	6–6
13	November 16	@ Dallas	L 133–138 (OT)	Shaedon Sharpe (36)	Donovan Clingan (11)	Deni Avdija (7)	American Airlines Center; 18,808	6–7
14	November 18	Phoenix	L 110–127	Shaedon Sharpe (29)	Donovan Clingan (12)	Avdija, Cissoko (5)	Moda Center; 17,051	6–8
15	November 19	Chicago	L 121–122	Jerami Grant (33)	Donovan Clingan (21)	Deni Avdija (11)	Moda Center; 17,795	6–9
16	November 21	@ Golden State	W 127–123	Avdija, Love (26)	Robert Williams (11)	Deni Avdija (13)	Chase Center; 18,064	7–9
17	November 23	@ Oklahoma City	L 95–122	Jerami Grant (21)	Donovan Clingan (8)	Camara, Cissoko, Hansen (3)	Paycom Center; 18,203	7–10
18	November 24	@ Milwaukee	W 115–103	Jerami Grant (35)	Donovan Clingan (11)	Deni Avdija (5)	Fiserv Forum; 16,526	8–10
19	November 26	San Antonio	L 102–115	Deni Avdija (37)	Donovan Clingan (11)	Deni Avdija (8)	Moda Center; 19,335	8–11
20	November 30	Oklahoma City	L 115–123	Deni Avdija (31)	Deni Avdija (19)	Deni Avdija (10)	Moda Center; 17,597	8–12

December: 6–8 (home: 4–3; road: 2–5)

Game	Date	Team	Score	High points	High rebounds	High assists	Location Attendance	Record
21	December 2	@ Toronto	L 118–121	Deni Avdija (25)	Donovan Clingan (11)	Deni Avdija (14)	Scotiabank Arena; 18,203	8–13
22	December 3	@ Cleveland	W 122–110	Deni Avdija (27)	Donovan Clingan (13)	Deni Avdija (7)	Rocket Arena; 19,432	9–13
23	December 5	@ Detroit	L 116–122	Deni Avdija (35)	Robert Williams III (14)	Deni Avdija (7)	Little Caesars Arena; 19,907	9–14
24	December 7	@ Memphis	L 96–119	Jerami Grant (21)	Avdija, Grant (7)	Deni Avdija (7)	FedExForum; 14,189	9–15
25	December 11	@ New Orleans	L 120–143	Shaedon Sharpe (21)	Kris Murray (9)	Deni Avdija (6)	Smoothie King Center; 13,448	9–16
26	December 14	Golden State	W 136–131	Grant, Sharpe (35)	Robert Williams III (11)	Deni Avdija (8)	Moda Center; 19,064	10–16
27	December 18	Sacramento	W 134–133 (OT)	Deni Avdija (35)	Jerami Grant (9)	Tied (5)	Moda Center; 16,382	11–16
28	December 20	@ Sacramento	W 98–93	Deni Avdija (24)	Donovan Clingan (14)	Deni Avdija (11)	Golden 1 Center; 15,963	12–16
29	December 22	Detroit	L 102–110	Shaedon Sharpe (25)	Donovan Clingan (10)	Deni Avdija (9)	Moda Center; 19,335	12–17
30	December 23	Orlando	L 106–110	Deni Avdija (25)	Donovan Clingan (14)	Deni Avdija (8)	Moda Center; 17,073	12–18
31	December 26	L.A. Clippers	L 103–119	Deni Avdija (29)	Robert Williams III (12)	Deni Avdija (9)	Moda Center; 17,839	12–19
32	December 28	Boston	W 114–108	Shaedon Sharpe (26)	Donovan Clingan (18)	Deni Avdija (10)	Moda Center; 17,949	13–19
33	December 29	Dallas	W 125–122	Deni Avdija (27)	Donovan Clingan (11)	Deni Avdija (11)	Moda Center; 18,067	14–19
34	December 31	@ Oklahoma City	L 95–124	Sidy Cissoko (19)	Robert Williams III (8)	Deni Avdija (7)	Paycom Center; 18,203	14–20

January: 9–6 (home: 6–2; road: 3–4)

Game	Date	Team	Score	High points	High rebounds	High assists	Location Attendance	Record
35	January 2	@ New Orleans	W 122–109	Deni Avdija (34)	Donovan Clingan (15)	Deni Avdija (11)	Smoothie King Center; 16,812	15–20
36	January 3	@ San Antonio	W 115–110	Deni Avdija (29)	Donovan Clingan (12)	Deni Avdija (10)	Frost Bank Center; 18,652	16–20
37	January 5	Utah	W 137–117	Deni Avdija (33)	Donovan Clingan (17)	Deni Avdija (9)	Moda Center; 16,785	17–20
38	January 7	Houston	W 103–102	Deni Avdija (41)	Clingan, Love (7)	Caleb Love (4)	Moda Center; 16,144	18–20
39	January 9	Houston	W 111–105	Toumani Camara (25)	Donovan Clingan (15)	Avdija, Clingan (6)	Moda Center; 17,012	19–20
40	January 11	New York	L 114–123	Deni Avdija (25)	Donovan Clingan (8)	Tied (4)	Moda Center; 17,867	19–21
41	January 13	@ Golden State	L 97–119	Shaedon Sharpe (19)	Donovan Clingan (9)	Caleb Love (7)	Chase Center; 18,064	19–22
42	January 15	Atlanta	W 117–101	Shaedon Sharpe (24)	Donovan Clingan (12)	Shaedon Sharpe (5)	Moda Center; 16,196	20–22
43	January 17	L.A. Lakers	W 132–116	Shaedon Sharpe (25)	Donovan Clingan (11)	Caleb Love (7)	Moda Center; 19,335	21–22
44	January 18	@ Sacramento	W 117–110	Deni Avdija (30)	Donovan Clingan (17)	Deni Avdija (8)	Golden 1 Center; 16,241	22–22
45	January 22	Miami	W 127–110	Shaedon Sharpe (27)	Robert Williams III (10)	Jrue Holiday (7)	Moda Center; 16,824	23–22
46	January 23	Toronto	L 98–110	Holiday, Sharpe (21)	Donovan Clingan (16)	Jrue Holiday (7)	Moda Center; 17,438	23–23
47	January 26	@ Boston	L 94–102	Jerami Grant (19)	Donovan Clingan (15)	Caleb Love (5)	TD Garden; 19,156	23–24
48	January 27	@ Washington	L 111–115	Shaedon Sharpe (31)	Donovan Clingan (20)	Jrue Holiday (5)	Capital One Arena; 13,852	23–25
49	January 30	@ New York	L 97–127	Shaedon Sharpe (26)	Robert Williams III (11)	Holiday, Love (4)	Madison Square Garden; 19,812	23–26

February: 6–6 (home: 3–4; road: 3–2)

Game	Date	Team	Score	High points	High rebounds	High assists	Location Attendance	Record
50	February 1	Cleveland	L 111–130	Caleb Love (21)	Clingan, Williams III (12)	Donovan Clingan (5)	Moda Center; 17,240	23–27
51	February 3	Phoenix	L 125–130	Jerami Grant (23)	Donovan Clingan (15)	Sidy Cissoko (6)	Moda Center; 16,092	23–28
52	February 6	Memphis	W 135–115	Jerami Grant (23)	Donovan Clingan (17)	Scoot Henderson (9)	Moda Center; 16,895	24–28
53	February 7	Memphis	W 122–115	Jerami Grant (29)	Donovan Clingan (19)	Caleb Love (8)	Moda Center; 16,273	25–28
54	February 9	Philadelphia	W 135–118	Toumani Camara (30)	Deni Avdija (10)	Deni Avdija (8)	Moda Center; 16,025	26–28
55	February 11	@ Minnesota	L 109–133	Jrue Holiday (23)	Donovan Clingan (9)	Blake Wesley (6)	Target Center; 16,988	26–29
56	February 12	@ Utah	W 135–119	Jrue Holiday (31)	Donovan Clingan (18)	Clingan, Holiday (7)	Delta Center; 18,186	27–29
All-Star Game
57	February 20	Denver	L 103–157	Jrue Holiday (19)	Donovan Clingan (9)	Deni Avdija (13)	Moda Center; 18,566	27–30
58	February 22	@ Phoenix	W 92–77	Clingan, Grant (23)	Donovan Clingan (13)	Jrue Holiday (7)	Mortgage Matchup Center; 17,071	28–30
59	February 24	Minnesota	L 121–124	Jrue Holiday (22)	Donovan Clingan (16)	Tied (5)	Moda Center; 17,581	28–31
60	February 26	@ Chicago	W 121–112	Jerami Grant (27)	Robert Williams III (14)	Jrue Holiday (7)	United Center; 18,516	29–31
61	February 28	@ Charlotte	L 93–109	Jrue Holiday (25)	Donovan Clingan (8)	Henderson, Holiday (4)	Spectrum Center; 19,634	29–32

March: 10–6 (home: 5–2; road: 5–4)

Game	Date	Team	Score	High points	High rebounds	High assists	Location Attendance	Record
62	March 1	@ Atlanta	L 101–135	Jrue Holiday (23)	Donovan Clingan (15)	Donovan Clingan (5)	State Farm Arena; 15,498	29–33
63	March 4	@ Memphis	W 122–114	Jrue Holiday (35)	Robert Williams III (11)	Jrue Holiday (11)	FedExForum; 14,661	30–33
64	March 6	@ Houston	L 99–106	Jerami Grant (21)	Donovan Clingan (13)	Jrue Holiday (10)	Toyota Center; 18,055	30–34
65	March 8	Indiana	W 131–111	Scoot Henderson (28)	Camara, Clingan (11)	Deni Avdija (8)	Moda Center; 16,833	31–34
66	March 10	Charlotte	L 101–103	Jerami Grant (24)	Donovan Clingan (11)	Deni Avdija (7)	Moda Center; 18,133	31–35
67	March 13	Utah	W 124–114	Henderson, Holiday (25)	Donovan Clingan (15)	Avdija, Holiday (8)	Moda Center; 17,352	32–35
68	March 15	@ Philadelphia	L 103–109	Deni Avdija (25)	Donovan Clingan (15)	Deni Avdija (9)	Xfinity Mobile Arena; 19,746	32–36
69	March 16	@ Brooklyn	W 114–95	Avdija, Camara (18)	Donovan Clingan (11)	Tied (5)	Barclays Center; 17,030	33–36
70	March 18	@ Indiana	W 127–119	Deni Avdija (32)	Donovan Clingan (13)	Jrue Holiday (8)	Gainbridge Fieldhouse; 17,274	34–36
71	March 20	@ Minnesota	W 108–104	Jerami Grant (26)	Clingan, Williams III (12)	Jrue Holiday (12)	Target Center; 18,978	35–36
72	March 22	@ Denver	L 112–128	Deni Avdija (23)	Donovan Clingan (13)	Deni Avdija (14)	Ball Arena; 19,924	35–37
73	March 23	Brooklyn	W 134–99	Toumani Camara (35)	Donovan Clingan (15)	Murray, Wesley (5)	Moda Center; 17,059	36–37
74	March 25	Milwaukee	W 130–99	Scoot Henderson (23)	Donovan Clingan (15)	Jrue Holiday (8)	Moda Center; 16,991	37–37
75	March 27	Dallas	L 93–100	Jrue Holiday (23)	Donovan Clingan (17)	Deni Avdija (6)	Moda Center; 17,701	37–38
76	March 29	Washington	W 123–88	Toumani Camara (23)	Avdija, Camara (7)	Scott Henderson (7)	Moda Center; 17,400	38–38
77	March 31	@ L.A. Clippers	W 114–104	Jrue Holiday (30)	Deni Avdija (11)	Deni Avdija (8)	Intuit Dome; 17,927	39–38

April: 3–2 (home: 3–0; road: 0–2)

Game	Date	Team	Score	High points	High rebounds	High assists	Location Attendance	Record
78	April 2	New Orleans	W 118–106	Jrue Holiday (27)	Clingan, Williams III (9)	Jrue Holiday (9)	Moda Center; 16,877	40–38
79	April 6	@ Denver	L 132–137 (OT)	Toumani Camara (30)	Donovan Clingan (12)	Jrue Holiday (11)	Ball Arena; 19,615	40–39
80	April 8	@ San Antonio	L 101–112	Deni Avdija (29)	Donovan Clingan (11)	Tied (6)	Frost Bank Center; 18,354	40–40
81	April 10	L.A. Clippers	W 116–97	Deni Avdija (35)	Donovan Clingan (13)	Deni Avdija (5)	Moda Center; 19,490	41–40
82	April 12	Sacramento	W 122–110	Deni Avdija (25)	Clingan, Williams III (10)	Deni Avdija (10)	Moda Center; 19,555	42–40

2025–26 season schedule

=== Play-in ===
2026 play-in game log
Total: 1–0 (Home: 0–0; Road: 1–0)
Play-in: 1–0 (home: 0–0; road: 1–0)

Game	Date	Team	Score	High points	High rebounds	High assists	Location Attendance	Record
1	April 14	@ Phoenix	W 114–110	Deni Avdija (41)	Donovan Clingan (11)	Deni Avdija (12)	Mortgage Matchup Center; 17,071	1–0

2025–26 season schedule

=== Playoffs ===
2026 playoff game log
Total: 1–4 (home: 0–2; road: 1–2)
First Round: 1–4 (home: 0–2; road: 1–2)

Game	Date	Team	Score	High points	High rebounds	High assists	Location Attendance	Series
1	April 19	@ San Antonio	L 98–111	Deni Avdija (30)	Deni Avdija (10)	Jrue Holiday (11)	Frost Bank Center; 19,372	0–1
2	April 21	@ San Antonio	W 106–103	Scoot Henderson (31)	Donovan Clingan (11)	Jrue Holiday (9)	Frost Bank Center; 19,338	1–1
3	April 24	San Antonio	L 108–120	Jrue Holiday (29)	Donovan Clingan (11)	Deni Avdija (9)	Moda Center; 20,438	1–2
4	April 26	San Antonio	L 93–114	Deni Avdija (26)	Deni Avdija (7)	Jrue Holiday (4)	Moda Center; 19,717	1–3
5	April 28	@ San Antonio	L 95–114	Deni Avdija (22)	Toumani Camara (8)	Jrue Holiday (7)	Frost Bank Center; 19,063	1–4

2026 playoff schedule

=== NBA Cup ===
==== West Group C ====
Pos	Team	Pld	W	L	PF	PA	PD	Qualification
1	San Antonio Spurs	4	3	1	483	457	+26	Advanced to knockout rounds
2	Denver Nuggets	4	2	2	484	461	+23	
3	Houston Rockets	4	2	2	463	449	+14	
4	Portland Trail Blazers	4	2	2	454	485	−31	
5	Golden State Warriors	4	1	3	436	468	−32	

Source: NBA

== Player statistics ==
Legend
GP	Games played	GS	Games started	MPG	Minutes per game
FG%	Field-goal percentage	3P%	3-point field-goal percentage	FT%	Free-throw percentage
RPG	Rebounds per game	APG	Assists per game	SPG	Steals per game
BPG	Blocks per game	PPG	Points per game

=== Regular season ===
Portland Trail Blazers statistics
Player	GP	GS	MPG	FG%	3P%	FT%	RPG	APG	SPG	BPG	PPG
Deni Avdija	66	66	33.3	.462	.318	.802	6.9	6.7	.8	.6	24.2
Toumani Camara	82	82	33.3	.440	.370	.708	5.1	2.5	1.1	.4	13.4
Sidy Cissoko	75	26	19.1	.398	.298	.659	2.2	1.5	.7	.3	5.1
Donovan Clingan	77	77	27.2	.520	.341	.680	11.6	2.1	.6	1.7	12.1
Javonte Cooke	19	0	4.9	.220	.130	1.000	1.0	.4	.3	.0	1.2
Jerami Grant	57	38	29.7	.453	.389	.814	3.5	2.1	.7	.6	18.6
Yang Hansen	43	1	7.0	.310	.119	.824	1.5	.5	.1	.2	2.2
Scoot Henderson	30	10	24.9	.418	.352	.840	2.7	3.7	.9	.3	14.2
Jrue Holiday	53	51	29.4	.451	.378	.838	4.6	6.1	1.0	.1	16.3
Jayson Kent	5	0	4.4	.571	.250	1.000	1.0	.0	.2	.2	2.0
Vít Krejčí^{†}	19	0	19.2	.405	.303	.733	2.7	1.7	.5	.3	7.2
Caleb Love	49	1	20.7	.388	.318	.735	2.3	2.5	.6	.1	10.4
Kris Murray	57	15	23.4	.467	.279	.684	3.6	1.4	.9	.4	5.8
Duop Reath	32	0	8.1	.446	.418	.833	1.2	.3	.2	.3	2.9
Rayan Rupert^{†}	48	0	12.0	.361	.310	.643	1.8	.7	.6	.0	2.9
Shaedon Sharpe	50	42	29.4	.452	.337	.787	4.3	2.6	1.4	.1	20.8
Matisse Thybulle	30	0	16.0	.433	.398	.840	2.0	.9	2.0	.5	5.8
Blake Wesley	31	0	11.6	.452	.278	.553	1.3	2.0	.5	.2	4.8
Robert Williams III	59	1	17.1	.708	.391	.596	7.0	1.0	.6	1.5	6.7
Chris Youngblood^{†}	2	0	5.5	.667	.667		.0	.5	.0	.0	3.0

=== Playoffs ===
Portland Trail Blazers statistics
Player	GP	GS	MPG	FG%	3P%	FT%	RPG	APG	SPG	BPG	PPG
Deni Avdija	5	5	34.8	.449	.350	.723	6.0	4.6	.4	.6	22.2
Toumani Camara	5	5	33.0	.289	.259	1.000	5.4	1.2	1.4	.6	7.0
Sidy Cissoko	4	0	6.5	.400	.400	1.000	1.3	.3	1.0	.0	2.8
Donovan Clingan	5	5	21.4	.304	.200	.500	7.8	2.2	.2	.6	7.0
Jerami Grant	5	0	22.4	.349	.333	.944	1.8	.4	1.0	.2	10.4
Yang Hansen	4	0	1.3	.000	.000		.3	.0	.0	.0	.0
Scoot Henderson	5	5	29.0	.475	.464	.750	1.6	1.2	.8	.2	15.0
Jrue Holiday	5	5	38.4	.403	.353	.889	5.4	7.2	1.4	.4	16.4
Vít Krejčí	4	0	4.0	.250	.000		.3	.5	.0	.0	.5
Kris Murray	5	0	5.0	.500	.000	.500	.6	.0	.0	.0	1.0
Shaedon Sharpe	5	0	13.4	.412	.273	.625	1.6	.6	.4	.4	7.2
Matisse Thybulle	4	0	13.3	.143	.091	1.000	2.0	1.0	.8	.8	1.8
Blake Wesley	4	0	1.3			.500	.0	.0	.0	.0	.3
Robert Williams III	5	0	21.6	.629	.333	.333	7.4	2.6	.6	1.2	9.6

- ^{†} Denotes player spent time with another team in the season. Stats reflect time with the Trail Blazers only.

== Transactions ==
=== Trades ===
Date	Trade		Ref.
June 25, 2025	To Memphis Grizzlies: Draft rights to Cedric Coward (No. 11)	To Portland Trail Blazers: Draft rights to Yang Hansen (No. 16); 2027 second-round pick (from Atlanta); 2028 first-round pick (from Orlando); 2028 second-round pick (from Sacramento)	
July 7, 2025	To Boston Celtics: Anfernee Simons	To Portland Trail Blazers: Jrue Holiday	
February 1, 2026	To Atlanta Hawks: Duop Reath; Own 2027 second-round pick; 2030 second-round pick (from New York)	To Portland Trail Blazers: Vít Krejčí	

=== Free agency ===
==== Re-signed ====
Date	Player	Ref.

==== Additions ====
Date	Player	Former Team	Ref.

==== Subtractions ====
Player	Reason	New Team	Ref.
Deandre Ayton	Waived	Los Angeles Lakers	
