= Dink Pate =

American basketball player (born 2006)

No. 11 – Westchester Knicks
- Position: Shooting guard / small forward
- League: NBA G League

Personal information
- Born: March 10, 2006 (age 20) Dallas, Texas, U.S.
- Listed height: 6 ft 8 in (2.03 m)
- Listed weight: 210 lb (95 kg)

Career information
- High school: L. G. Pinkston (West Dallas, Texas)
- NBA draft: 2025: undrafted
- Playing career: 2023–present

Career history
- 2023–2024: NBA G League Ignite
- 2024–2025: Mexico City Capitanes
- 2025–present: Westchester Knicks

Career highlights
- NBA G League Next Up Game (2024)
- Stats at Basketball Reference

Sasha "Dink" Pate (born March 10, 2006) is an American professional basketball player for the Westchester Knicks of the NBA G League. He became the youngest professional basketball player in U.S. history after joining the NBA G League Ignite.

== Early life and high school career ==
A native of Dallas, Texas, Pate played primarily point guard at L. G. Pinkston High School in West Dallas. In his last season, he averaged 20.3 points and was the named the 2022–2023 District 13-4A Most Valuable Player. He was also named to the 2022–2023 University Interscholastic League Boys 4A All-Region Team and All-State Team. Wanting to focus full time on basketball, Pate graduated from Pinkston a year early and continued his education by enrolling in online classes created by the NBA G League at Arizona State University.

=== Recruiting ===
Rated as a five-star prospect by ESPN, Pate announced he would forgo playing college basketball and instead play professionally for NBA G League Ignite after reclassifying to the 2023 class. He would have enrolled at Alabama or Arkansas had he not joined Ignite.

College recruiting
Name	Hometown	School	Height	Weight	Commit date
Dink Pate; SG	Dallas, TX	West Dallas (TX)	6 ft 8 in (2.03 m)	210 lb (95 kg)	—
Dink Pate; SG	Recruit ratings: Rivals: 247Sports: ESPN: (88)				
Overall recruit ranking: Rivals: 35 247Sports: 30 ESPN: 30
Note: In many cases, Scout, Rivals, 247Sports, On3, and ESPN may conflict in their listings of height and weight.; In these cases, the average was taken. ESPN grades are on a 100-point scale.; Sources: "2023 Team Ranking". Rivals.

== Professional career ==
=== NBA G League Ignite (2023–2024) ===
On April 17, 2023, Pate signed a two-year contract with the NBA G League Ignite. By joining Ignite, he became the youngest known professional basketball player in U.S. history, surpassing Scoot Henderson by five weeks. On February 27, 2024, Pate scored a career-high 16 points along with nine assists against the Texas Legends.

After the shutting down of the NBA G League Ignite on March 28, 2024, Pate was suggested to have had a waiver request to enter the 2024 NBA draft due to the team's closure and having turned 18 during the season, but he was denied entry to the draft that year.

=== Mexico City Capitanes (2024–2025) ===
On July 3, 2024, Pate signed with the Mexico City Capitanes.

=== Westchester Knicks (2025–present) ===
Pate entered the 2025 NBA draft, but went undrafted and signed with the New York Knicks on June 27, 2025. He spent the 2025–26 season with the Westchester Knicks of the NBA G League, averaging 16.0 points, 6.7 rebounds, and 3.6 assists across 50 appearances. On April 9, 2026, Pate committed to play for the Providence Friars for head coach Bryan Hodgson. On October 16, it was announced that Pate would not play for Providence due to eligiblity issues and would return to the NBA G League.

== Career statistics ==
Legend
GP	Games played	GS	Games started	MPG	Minutes per game
FG%	Field goal percentage	3P%	3-point field goal percentage	FT%	Free throw percentage
RPG	Rebounds per game	APG	Assists per game	SPG	Steals per game
BPG	Blocks per game	PPG	Points per game	**Bold**	Career high

=== NBA G League ===
Dink Pate NBA G League statistics
Year	Team	GP	GS	MPG	FG%	3P%	FT%	RPG	APG	SPG	BPG	PPG
2023–24	G League Ignite	31	20	23.5	.347	.214	**.727**	2.9	**3.8**	.6	.1	8.0
2024–25	Mexico City	34	**34**	26.9	.408	.261	.581	5.1	2.1	.6	.1	10.1
2025–26	Westchester	**36**	33	**30.8**	**.416**	**.368**	.708	**6.7**	3.6	**.8**	**.3**	**16.0**
Career		101	87	27.2	.396	.315	.669	5.0	3.2	.7	.2	11.5
