= London Johnson =

American-Jamaican basketball player (born 2004)

Personal information
- Born: June 6, 2004 (age 22) Norcross, Georgia, U.S.
- Listed height: 6 ft 3 in (1.91 m)
- Listed weight: 175 lb (79 kg)

Career information
- High school: Norcross (Norcross, Georgia)
- Playing career: 2022–present
- Position: Point guard / shooting guard

Career history
- 2022–2024: NBA G League Ignite
- 2024–2025: Maine Celtics
- 2025: Cleveland Charge

Career highlights
- Nike Hoop Summit (2021)

London Johnson (born June 6, 2004) is an American-Jamaican basketball player. He has previously played in the NBA G League.

== High school career ==
Johnson attended Norcross High School in Norcross, Georgia. As a junior, Johnson helped lead his team to victory in the Georgia High School Association Class 7A State Championship. Johnson scored 27 points and grabbed 8 rebounds in a 58–45 win against Berkmar High School. Johnson was selected for the World Team at the Nike Hoop Summit in 2021, was tabbed a Gatorade Player of the Year finalist, and was named to both the Atlanta Tip-Off all-metro team and the Gwinnett Tip-Off all-county team.

=== Recruiting ===
Johnson was a consensus four-star recruit on Rivals, 247Sports, On3, and ESPN, and regarded to be a top player in Georgia. On December 21, 2021, Johnson narrowed his commitment options to Georgia, Virginia, NC State, Clemson, USC, and Alabama. On October 3, 2022, Johnson reclassified to the 2022 class and decided to forgo college basketball, signing a two-year deal with NBA G League Ignite reportedly worth seven figures.

College recruiting
Name	Hometown	School	Height	Weight	Commit date
London Johnson; PG / SG	Norcross, GA	Norcross (GA)	6 ft 3 in (1.91 m)	175 lb (79 kg)	Oct 20, 2025
London Johnson; PG / SG	Recruit ratings: Rivals: 247Sports: On3: ESPN: (86)				
Overall recruit ranking: Rivals: — 247Sports: 64 On3: — ESPN: —
Note: In many cases, Scout, Rivals, 247Sports, On3, and ESPN may conflict in their listings of height and weight.; In these cases, the average was taken. ESPN grades are on a 100-point scale.; Sources: "Louisville 2025 Basketball Commitments". Rivals.; "2025 Louisville Cardinals Recruiting Class". ESPN.; "2025 Team Ranking". Rivals.

== College career ==
On October 20, 2025, Johnson committed to the Louisville Cardinals. The commitment drew criticism from coaches, especially Michigan State head coach Tom Izzo, who suggested that his age and prior experience could create an unfair advantage. Johnson joined Louisville midseason in December 2025 and ultimately did not play during the 2025–26 season; using a redshirt while contesting his eligibility. In August 2026, Johnson was dismissed from the program after violating university policy and rules.

== Professional career ==
=== NBA G League Ignite (2022–2024) ===
On October 3, 2022, Johnson signed a record deal to play for NBA G League Ignite. In his first season, Johnson averaged 10.5 points, two rebounds, and three assists in 30 games played. With the departure of teammate Scoot Henderson, Johnson was expected to have a breakout second season with the Ignite, but failed to improve his numbers significantly in a disastrous final season for the Ignite team, who finished with an abysmal 2–32 record. Johnson averaged 10.6 points, 2.2 rebounds, and 4.9 assists in 25 games played in his final season with the Ignite.

=== Maine Celtics (2024–2025) ===
Johnson did not declare for the 2024 NBA draft, and was selected with the 21st overall pick in the 2024 G League Draft by the Maine Celtics. In three games with the Celtics, he averaged 2.3 points, one rebound, and one assist. On January 1, 2025, Johnson was waived by the Celtics.

=== Cleveland Charge (2025) ===
On January 15, 2025, Johnson was acquired by the Cleveland Charge. He was waived eight days later, but was reacquired on February 2.

== National team career ==
Johnson played for the Jamaican U17 Team at the 2021 FIBA U17 Centrobasket Championships, and was named to the All-Tournament team after averaging 36 points, 9 rebounds, 4 assists, and 4 steals a game.

== Career statistics ==
Legend
GP	Games played	GS	Games started	MPG	Minutes per game
FG%	Field goal percentage	3P%	3-point field goal percentage	FT%	Free throw percentage
RPG	Rebounds per game	APG	Assists per game	SPG	Steals per game
BPG	Blocks per game	PPG	Points per game	**Bold**	Career high

=== NBA G League ===
Year	Team	GP	GS	MPG	FG%	3P%	FT%	RPG	APG	SPG	BPG	PPG
2022–23	NBA G League Ignite	**30**	**14**	25.6	**.432**	.329	.792	2.0	3.0	**.9**	.2	10.5
2023–24	NBA G League Ignite	25	8	**26.0**	.430	.319	.805	**2.2**	**4.9**	.6	**.4**	**10.6**
2024–25	Maine Celtics	3	1	13.3	.250	.333	**1.000**	1.0	1.0	.7	.0	2.3
2024–25	Cleveland Charge	18	2	13.7	.423	**.346**	.600	1.4	1.9	.6	.1	3.3
Career		76	25	22.3	.428	.328	.789	1.8	3.3	.7	.3	8.5
