= Leonard King (basketball) =

American basketball player (born 1966)

Personal information
- Born: 1966 (age 59–60)
- Listed height: 6 ft 4 in (1.93 m)

Career information
- High school: Cleveland Heights (Cleveland Heights, Ohio)
- College: Florida A&M (1984–1989)
- NBA draft: 1989: undrafted
- Playing career: 1991–2004
- Position: Guard / forward
- Coaching career: 2007–2013

Career history

Playing
- 1991–1998: Otago Nuggets
- 1999–2000: North Otago Penguins
- 2004: Otago Nuggets

Coaching
- 2007–2010: Mackay Meteors
- 2011: Brisbane Spartans
- 2012–2013: Northside Wizards

Career highlights
- As player: 2× CBL champion (1999, 2000); CBL Most Valuable Player (2000); NZNBL Most Outstanding Guard (1994); 2× NZNBL All-Star Five (1994, 1995); As coach: 2× QBL Coach of the Year (2009, 2010)

Leonard King (born 1966) is an American former basketball player. He played college basketball for the Florida A&M Rattlers before playing the majority of his career in New Zealand with the Otago Nuggets. Listed as a forward in college, he was named the recipient of the New Zealand NBL Most Outstanding Guard Award in 1994.

== High school and college career ==
King attended Cleveland Heights High School in Cleveland Heights, Ohio, where he was named Class AAA All-Ohio as a senior in 1983–84.

King played college basketball for the Florida A&M Rattlers between 1984 and 1989. He sat out the 1987–88 season. In 107 games, he averaged 15.1 points, 5.3 rebounds, 1.8 assists and 1.7 steals per game.

== Professional career ==
As a professional, King played in Germany, Italy, Portugal, Luxembourg and New Zealand.

King played for the Otago Nuggets in the New Zealand National Basketball League (NZNBL) from 1991 to 1998 and again in 2004. He was named NZNBL Most Outstanding Guard in 1994 and earned NZNBL All-Star Five honors in 1994 and 1995. He played 181 games for the Nuggets and averaged more than 25 points a game. As of 2019, he is the franchise's all time leader in points, rebounds and steals, as well as second in assists and blocks.

In 1999 and 2000, King played for the North Otago Penguins in the Conference Basketball League (CBL). He helped them win back-to-back championships and earned the Most Valuable Player award in 2000.

== Coaching career ==
Following the conclusion of his playing career, King began working with Basketball New Zealand as a high performance coach. He was an assistant coach with the New Zealand Tall Blacks in 2005 and 2006.

In 2007, King moved to Queensland, Australia, to coach the Mackay Meteors in the Queensland Basketball League (QBL). He was named the QBL Coach of the Year in 2009 and 2010. He left the Meteors following the 2010 season.

In 2011, King served as head coach of the Brisbane Spartans of the South East Australian Basketball League (SEABL).

In 2012 and 2013, King served as head coach of the Northside Wizards in the QBL.

King worked for Basketball Queensland during the 2010s and was the Emerging Boomers' assistant coach in 2016. In 2017, he returned to Basketball New Zealand as their general manager for high performance.

== Personal life ==
King has two children. His son, Mojave, is also a professional basketball player.

King's great-grandmother was full Native American while his grandfather was half Native American and half African American.
