= Sidy Cissoko =

French basketball player (born 2004)

No. 91 – Portland Trail Blazers
- Position: Small forward / shooting guard
- League: NBA

Personal information
- Born: 2 April 2004 (age 22) Saint-Maurice, France
- Listed height: 6 ft 6 in (1.98 m)
- Listed weight: 220 lb (100 kg)

Career information
- NBA draft: 2023: 2nd round, 44th overall pick
- Drafted by: San Antonio Spurs
- Playing career: 2021–present

Career history
- 2021–2022: Baskonia
- 2021–2022: →Iraurgi SB
- 2022–2023: NBA G League Ignite
- 2023–2025: San Antonio Spurs
- 2023–2025: →Austin Spurs
- 2025–present: Portland Trail Blazers
- 2025–2026: →Rip City Remix

Career highlights
- NBA G League Next Up Game (2023); Nike Hoop Summit (2022)
- Stats at NBA.com
- Stats at Basketball Reference

Sidy Cissoko (/ˈsiːdi sɪˈsoʊkoʊ/ SEE-dee sih-SOH-koh; born 2 April 2004) is a French professional basketball player for the Portland Trail Blazers of the National Basketball Association (NBA). He previously played for the NBA G League Ignite.

== Early life ==
Cissoko was born on 2 April 2004 in Saint-Maurice, France. His father, Yaya (or Yakia), was a basketball player who represented Senegal at the 1980 Summer Olympics in Moscow. Growing up in France, Sidy played basketball from a young age and looked up to Kyrie Irving, seeing as he was shorter than the rest of his teammates at the time. He reached the under-15 level with CTC Center Essonne.

In 2017, at 13 years of age, Cissoko moved to Spain and joined the youth ranks of Baskonia. In 2020–21, Cissoko played with the Baskonia reserves in the fourth-tier Liga EBA and averaged a team-leading 17.4 points per game. He also led the Baskonia junior (under-18) team to a fourth-place finish in the junior national championship while leading the competition in points and assists.

== Professional career ==
Cissoko was called up to the Baskonia first team ahead of the 2021–22 ACB season. On September 26, 2021, Cissoko made his senior debut for Baskonia at the age of 17, playing 28 seconds in a 72–61 loss to Joventut Badalona. This allowed Baskonia to retain his European rights.

A few days after his debut, Cissoko was loaned out to Baskonia's satellite club, Iraurgi SB, in the second-tier LEB Oro. He averaged 10.8 points, 3.0 rebounds and 2.4 assists in 32 games played. Cissoko trained with the Baskonia first team as well; he later said he learned a lot from watching Wade Baldwin IV.

Cissoko was invited to play in the 2022 Nike Hoop Summit in Portland, Oregon, recording three points, seven rebounds, four assists and three steals in 23 minutes for the World Team in a 102–80 loss to Team USA.

=== NBA G League Ignite (2022–2023) ===
On July 19, 2022, it was announced that Cissoko had signed with the NBA G League Ignite, a developmental team affiliated with the NBA G League. Cissoko became the first European player to sign with the Ignite. He pointed to the success of 2022 lottery pick, Dyson Daniels, who played at the NBA Global Academy in Australia before spending the 2021–22 season with the Ignite. At the time of his signing, Cissoko was ranked as the third-best European prospect in his class by Jonathan Givony of ESPN, behind countrymen Victor Wembanyama and Rayan Rupert.

Cissoko was one of four Ignite players chosen to compete in the Rising Stars Challenge at the 2023 NBA All-Star Weekend, recording one rebound, one assist and one steal for Team Jason in a 40–32 loss to Team Joakim. He was also one of 24 players named to the G League's inaugural Next Up Game.

On January 16, 2023, Cissoko scored a then-season-high 21 points in a 141–119 defeat to the Fort Wayne Mad Ants. In another loss to the Mad Ants the following day, he scored 20 points on 8-of-10 shooting, including 4-of-5 from three. Cissoko had five straight games of 20 or more points in February and March. This included a season-high 24-point performance, along with six rebounds and four assists, in a 123–97 loss to the Memphis Hustle on February 24. Cissoko tied his season high with 24 points against the Sioux Falls Skyforce on March 15.

For the 2022-2023 regular season, Cissoko played in 28 games with the G League Ignite and averaged 12.8 points, 2.8 rebounds and 3.6 assists while playing 29.3 minutes per game.

On March 29, 2023, Cissoko announced he was entering his name in the 2023 NBA draft.

=== San Antonio Spurs (2023–2025) ===
Cissoko was selected with the 44th overall pick of the draft by the San Antonio Spurs. On July 27, 2023, he signed with the Spurs.

Cissoko was immediately assigned to the Austin Spurs during his rookie season. He played with Austin during the Tip-Off Tournament and averaged 9.5 points, 6.0 rebounds and 4.0 assists in 27.0 minutes in four games before making his NBA debut on November 20, 2023. In his debut, Cissoko played four minutes and recorded no stats other than one turnover in a 99-124 loss to the Los Angeles Clippers.

Cissoko struggled shooting-wise in the NBA, shooting 1-for-7 on FGs in his first eight games. He turned the performance around and in the final four games of his rookie season, shot 15-for-26 on FGs.

Cissoko spent most of his rookie and sophomore seasons in the G League. In his regular season debut with the Austin Spurs on December 28, 2023, Cissoko recorded 22 points, nine rebounds, two assists, and two steals in a 118-117 victory over the South Bay Lakers. He went on to average 15.5 points, 4.9 rebounds, and 3.3 assists in 29.3 minutes per game for Austin.

=== Portland Trail Blazers (2025–present) ===
On February 3, 2025, Cissoko, alongside Zach LaVine and three first-round picks and two second-round picks, was traded to the Sacramento Kings in exchange for De'Aaron Fox and Jordan McLaughlin, in a deal in which the Spurs also sent Zach Collins, Tre Jones and a 2025-first round pick to the Chicago Bulls. On February 5, Cissoko, along with two second-round draft picks (2028, 2029), was traded to the Washington Wizards in exchange for center Jonas Valančiūnas, but was waived the next day.

On February 8, 2025, Cissoko signed a two-way contract with the Portland Trail Blazers. He made five appearances for the Trail Blazers during the final stretch of the season, averaging 2.0 points, 2.2 rebounds, and 1.8 assists. On February 20, 2026, Cissoko's contract was converted into a 2-year, $3.2 million standard deal.

== National team career ==
Cissoko played for the France national under-18 team at the 2021 FIBA U18 European Challengers. He averaged 7.8 points, 3.2 rebounds, 3.0 assists and 2.4 steals per game. At the 2022 FIBA U18 European Championship the following year, Cissoko averaged 11.3 points, 4.9 rebounds, 3.1 assists and 2.4 steals per game.

== Career statistics ==
Legend
GP	Games played	GS	Games started	MPG	Minutes per game
FG%	Field goal percentage	3P%	3-point field goal percentage	FT%	Free throw percentage
RPG	Rebounds per game	APG	Assists per game	SPG	Steals per game
BPG	Blocks per game	PPG	Points per game	**Bold**	Career high

=== NBA ===
==== Regular season ====
Year	Team	GP	GS	MPG	FG%	3P%	FT%	RPG	APG	SPG	BPG	PPG
2023–24	San Antonio	12	0	11.7	.485	.083	**.800**	1.8	.8	.6	**.3**	3.8
2024–25	San Antonio	17	0	3.2	**.500**	**.429**	.167	.6	.4	.1	.0	1.3
2024–25	Portland	5	0	12.0	.333	.000	.667	**2.2**	**1.8**	.2	.2	2.0
2025–26	Portland	**75**	**26**	**19.1**	.398	.298	.659	**2.2**	1.5	**.7**	**.3**	**5.1**
Career		109	26	15.5	.408	.283	.652	1.9	1.2	.6	.3	4.2

==== Playoffs ====
Year	Team	GP	GS	MPG	FG%	3P%	FT%	RPG	APG	SPG	BPG	PPG
2026	Portland	4	0	6.5	.400	.400	1.000	1.3	.3	1.0	.6	2.8
Career		4	0	6.5	.400	.400	1.000	1.3	.3	1.0	.6	2.8
