= Carlton J. Kell High School =

Public high school in Cobb County, Georgia, United States

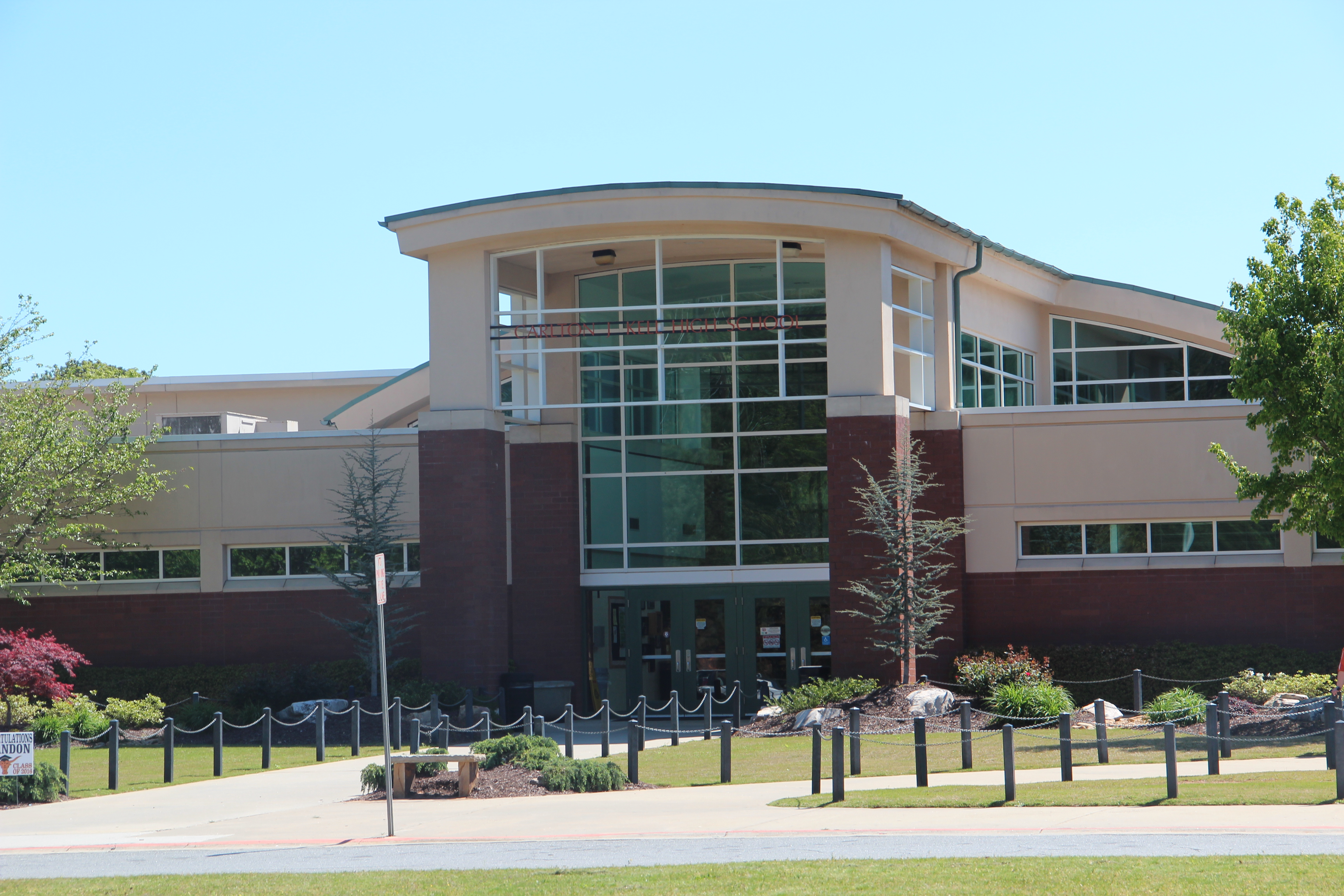
- Kell High School front entrance

Location
- 4770 Lee Waters Road; Marietta, Georgia 30066; United States; 34°03′50″N 84°30′56″W

Information
- Type: Public high school
- Opened: 2002; 24 years ago
- School district: Cobb County School District
- Principal: Dr. Peter Giles
- Teaching staff: 92.10 FTE
- Grades: 9–12
- Enrollment: 1,587 (2024–2025)
- Student to teacher ratio: 17.23
- Campus: Suburban
- Colors: Copper and black
- Nickname: Longhorns
- Yearbook: The Longhorn
- Website: www.cobbk12.org/Kell

Carlton J. Kell High School is a public high school in the Cobb County School District in the US state of Georgia. The school is located in unincorporated Cobb County, with a Marietta post office address, just northwest of Atlanta. The school was founded in 2002. It is also an Advanced Placement Certified School.

== History ==
Carlton J. Kell High School was established in 2002. It was named after a prominent coach in the Cobb County School District.

== Demographics ==
The demographic breakdown of the 1,582 students enrolled for the 2023–2024 school year was:

- Male - 52.0%
- Female - 48.0%
- Native American/Alaskan - 1.3%
- Asian/Pacific Islander - 3.0%
- Black - 24.7%
- Hispanic - 22.2%
- White - 44.6%
- Multiracial - 5.4%

Additionally, 43.7% of the enrolled students qualified for free or reduced lunch.

== Notable alumni ==
- Jonathan Dwyer, 2007, football player; played for the Pittsburgh Steelers and Arizona Cardinals
- Scoot Henderson, 2021, professional basketball player for the Portland Trail Blazers
- Christine Ko, 2006, actress
- Brendan Langley, 2013, NFL cornerback for the Denver Broncos
- Quincy Mauger, 2013, NFL Safety for Atlanta Falcons.
- Adam Morgan, 2008, professional baseball player for the Philadelphia Phillies
- Ben Paulsen, 2006, professional baseball player
- Zeke Spruill, 2008, professional baseball player for the Lamigo Monkeys of the CPBL
- Lucas Till, 2008, actor
- Mike Will Made It (Michael Len Williams), 2007, music producer
