= NBA G League Ignite =

- Conference: Western
- League: NBA G League
- Founded: 2020
- Folded: 2024
- History: NBA G League Ignite; 2020–2024
- Arena: The Dollar Loan Center
- Location: Henderson, Nevada
- Team colors: Purple, black, white
- Head coach: Jason Hart
- Championships: 0
- Website: Official website

The NBA G League Ignite was a developmental basketball team in the NBA G League. Originally based in Walnut Creek, California, with home games planned to have been played at the Ultimate Fieldhouse for their first two seasons before moving to Henderson, Nevada for their final two seasons of existence, the team was designed to play exhibition games outside the G League's traditional scheduling as part of a one-year development program for elite National Basketball Association (NBA) prospects. Unlike other NBA G League rosters, its roster was primarily made up of both talented young prospects and veteran players meant to guide the younger prospects. The NBA G League Ignite was created on April 16, 2020, and was touted as an alternative to college basketball at the time, offering the young prospects salaries of up to $500,000 for time spent with them at a time when an average G League contract would be of lesser value by comparison.

== History ==
The NBA G League has been an avenue for high school, college and international prospects to be drafted into the NBA since 2008 back when the league was named the NBA Development League (NBA D-League). On October 18, 2018, the G League introduced Select Contracts of $125,000 for elite prospects, including opportunities for basketball development, life skills, mentorship, and academic scholarships starting from the 2019–20 season. However, no players in the 2019 high school class signed a Select Contract.

On April 16, 2020, the G League announced a raised salary for elite prospects and a one-year development program outside of its traditional team structure. The prospects would play alongside veteran players on a select team that would take part in training and 10 to 12 exhibition games against other G League teams, foreign national teams, and NBA academies. Under this select team that later became the NBA G League Ignite, younger players would have earned financial incentives for playing games, participating in community events, and attending life skills programs coordinated by the G League. They would also receive a full scholarship to Arizona State University, which was partnered with the NBA during that period of time.

On the same day that the G League's new development program was announced, Jalen Green, the highest ranked player in the 2020 high school class according to ESPN, became the first player to join the NBA G League Ignite, earning $500,000. The G League subsequently drew attention as an alternative to college basketball, with some media outlets speculating that Green's decision would threaten the National Collegiate Athletic Association. Green was soon joined on the team by fellow five-star recruits Isaiah Todd and Daishen Nix, both former college commits, as well as Kai Sotto of the Philippines. On June 9, 2020, former NBA player and coach Brian Shaw was named head coach of the Ignite. On July 16, Jonathan Kuminga, the highest ranked player in the 2021 high school class, reclassified to the 2020 class and signed with the Ignite. The name of the team, previously referred to as the G League Select Team, was announced as the NBA G League Ignite on September 2. On November 12, the Ignite signed veteran players Brandon Ashley, Bobby Brown, Cody Demps, Reggie Hearn, and Amir Johnson to play alongside and mentor the team's prospects. On January 14, 2021, the Ignite signed Donta Hall and Jarrett Jack.

The Ignite joined the 2020–21 season playing a full 15-game schedule in the single-site bubble tournament at the ESPN Wide World of Sports Complex in Orlando, Florida, with 11 teams opting not to participate. In their first season, they put up an 8–7 record and entered the G League Playoffs in their first season, but they lost in the quarterfinal round to the Raptors 905.

In the Ignite's second season, they were only allowed to play in the Winter Showcase, an early-season tournament that allowed both them and the Capitanes de la Ciudad de México, a Mexican-based G League team that was meant to join the G League Ignite in their inaugural season before the COVID-19 pandemic changed plans for them, an opportunity to compete with other G League teams due to the reeling effects of that pandemic. This season was primarily led by new prospects Dyson Daniels from Australia, former Yakima Valley College student MarJon Beauchamp, and 5-star recruit Jaden Hardy. While they were still based in Walnut Creek, California during this time, the Ignite would play their home games at the Michelob Ultra Arena in Las Vegas, Nevada due to the still-ongoing effects of the COVID-19 pandemic at the time. In the 12 games they were allowed to play in, the Ignite held a 6–6 record, which gave them a 4th-place finish in the West Division but did not give them qualifications to compete any further in the Winter Showcase. They also competed against the Capitanes de la Ciudad de México alongside other NBA G League teams in exhibition games after the Winter Showcase ended in order to give the younger Ignite players some extra reps during the second half of the G League's season.

For their third season, the NBA G League Ignite moved from Walnut Creek, California to the Las Vegas Valley to play their home games at the Henderson Event Center in Henderson, Nevada going forward. This season would best be noted for the 2022 Metropolitans 92 vs. NBA G League Ignite series of exhibition games that not only showcased the talents of Scoot Henderson and other young G League talents from the Ignite, but also that of 7'4" center Victor Wembanyama (and later Top 10 selection Bilal Coulibaly) from the Metropolitans' end as well. The Ignite would see their highest amount of wins and highest number of wins that season with 11 total, but they would also finish with the highest amount of losses, as well as the highest number of losses by this point in their existence with 21 games lost as well.

During their fourth season of existence, commissioner Adam Silver indicated in a press conference on February 17, 2024, that the NBA would reassess the future of the Ignite as a whole. Silver noted that the implementation of name, image, and likeness rights in college basketball had diminished the need for an official feeder program. In addition to collegiate and even high school student athlete compensation being fully adopted by the early 2020s, the increasing growth of the competitive Overtime Elite youth basketball league being an alternative to not just the Ignite, but also collegiate and even professional basketball for younger prospects also became a factor in reassessing the Ignite's future in the NBA G League.

On March 21, 2024, it was announced that the NBA would be shutting down the franchise after the end of the 2023–24 NBA G League season. Their final game as a franchise came on March 28, 2024, losing 113–102 to the Ontario Clippers. They lost 32 games in their 34-game season to set a mark for most losses in the history of the G League for one season to go with the lowest winning percentage ever at .059, while their two wins (which came on January 31 & February 12, 2024 with a 123–118 victory over the Iowa Wolves and a 123–114 win over the recently rebranded Indiana Mad Ants (now Noblesville Boom) respectively) tied the Iowa Wolves of the pandemic-shortened 2020–21 NBA G League season for the fewest wins ever in a season. Not only that, but the four wins they got during the Showcase Cup earlier on in the season (which did not count towards the overall record of the NBA G League's official season) tied the records of the Greensboro Swarm and Raptors 905 for the worst records of the event that year. For the 2024 NBA draft, former G League Ignite players Ron Holland, Matas Buzelis, Babacar Sané, and Tyler Smith were the last players representing the team properly for the NBA draft, though Sané would be the only player of that group to go undrafted that year, with Smith being the last Ignite player selected directly from the team. Other young players that were on the team that season like Izan Almansa, Thierry Darlan, London Johnson, and Dink Pate would also look to be selected in future draft classes by as early as 2025, which Almansa and Pate decided to do for their draft stock stipulations, though neither player would get selected in that draft when it was all said and done, despite Almansa getting a "green room" invite to the draft following the conclusion of the first round. Meanwhile, Darlan and Johnson would try their luck with entering the 2026 NBA draft under what would have been their senior years in college.

== Season by season ==
Season	Division	Regular season				Postseason results
Season	Division	Finish	Wins	Losses	Pct.	Postseason results
NBA G League Ignite
2020–21	—	8th	8	7	.533	Lost quarterfinal (Raptors 905) 102–127
2021–22	West	4th	6	6	.500	did not qualify
2022–23	West	11th	11	21	.344	did not qualify
2023–24	West	15th	2	32	.059	did not qualify
Regular Season Record			27	66	.290	
Playoff Record			0	1	.000	

== Final roster ==
2023–24 NBA G League Ignite roster
Players

Pos.	No.	Player	Height	Weight	DOB	From
C	10	Efe Abogidi	6 ft 9 in (2.06 m)	228 lb (103 kg)	2001-10-11	Washington State
F	33	Izan Almansa (P)	6 ft 10 in (2.08 m)	230 lb (104 kg)	2005-06-07	Spain
F	13	Matas Buzelis	6 ft 10 in (2.08 m)	209 lb (95 kg)	2004-10-13	Sunrise Christian (KS)
G	30	Norris Cole	6 ft 2 in (1.88 m)	180 lb (82 kg)	1988-10-13	Cleveland State
G	84	Thierry Darlan (P)	6 ft 8 in (2.03 m)	211 lb (96 kg)	2004-02-03	NBA Academy Africa (SEN)
F/C	62	Will Davis	6 ft 8 in (2.03 m)	228 lb (103 kg)	1992-11-09	UC Irvine
G	21	Michael II Frazier	6 ft 3 in (1.91 m)	200 lb (91 kg)	1994-03-08	Florida
G	3	Admon Gilder	6 ft 4 in (1.93 m)	205 lb (93 kg)	1995-11-14	Gonzaga
F	0	Ron Holland	6 ft 8 in (2.03 m)	206 lb (93 kg)	2005-07-07	Duncanville HS (TX)
G	23	John Jenkins	6 ft 4 in (1.93 m)	206 lb (93 kg)	1991-03-06	Vanderbilt
G	2	London Johnson (P)	6 ft 3 in (1.91 m)	181 lb (82 kg)	2004-06-06	Norcross HS (GA)
G	8	Jeremy Pargo	6 ft 2 in (1.88 m)	219 lb (99 kg)	1986-03-17	Gonzaga
G	1	Dink Pate (P)	6 ft 8 in (2.03 m)	210 lb (95 kg)	2006-03-10	L. G. Pinkston HS (TX)
G/F	4	Babacar Sané	6 ft 7 in (2.01 m)	230 lb (104 kg)	2003-09-19	NBA Academy Africa (SEN)
F	11	Tyler Smith	6 ft 11 in (2.11 m)	224 lb (102 kg)	2004-11-02	George Bush HS (TX)
F	14	Isaiah Todd	6 ft 9 in (2.06 m)	219 lb (99 kg)	2001-10-17	Word of God (NC)
G	32	Gabe York	6 ft 3 in (1.91 m)	190 lb (86 kg)	1993-08-02	Arizona

Coaches
Head coach
- Jason Hart
Assistant(s)
- Rod Baker
- Amir Johnson
- CJ Williams

Legend
- (DP) Unsigned draft pick
- (FA) Free agent
- (S) Suspended
- (P) Prospects
- (NBA) On assignment from NBA affiliate
- (TW) Two-way affiliate player
- Injured

Roster
Updated: January 31, 2024

== All-time roster ==
- Efe Abogidi
- Dakarai Allen
- Izan Almansa
- Brandon Ashley
- MarJon Beauchamp
- Bobby Brown
- Matas Buzelis
- Sidy Cissoko
- Norris Cole
- Dyson Daniels
- Thierry Darlan
- Will Davis
- Aubrey Dawkins
- Cody Demps
- Michael Foster Jr.
- Michael Frazier
- Admon Gilder
- Jessie Govan
- Marcus Graves
- Jalen Green
- Donta Hall
- Amauri Hardy
- Jaden Hardy
- Reggie Hearn
- Scoot Henderson
- Ron Holland
- Jarrett Jack
- John Jenkins
- Eugene "Pooh" Jeter
- Amir Johnson
- London Johnson
- Mojave King
- Kosta Koufos
- Jonathan Kuminga
- Eric Mika
- C. J. Miles
- Leonard Miller
- Kevin Murphy
- Daishen Nix
- Landry Nnoko
- Shareef O'Neal
- Jeremy Pargo
- Dink Pate
- Malik Pope
- Babacar Sané
- Princepal Singh
- Tyler Smith
- James Southerland
- David Stockton
- Isaiah Todd
- Gabe York
- Cameron Young
- Zeng Fanbo

In addition to them, Kai Sotto would also join the roster, but he would depart with them before playing a single, official game with them due to him playing for the Philippine national team instead during their inaugural season at the 2021 NBA G League Bubble.

== Drafted players ==
List of G League Ignite players selected in the NBA Draft
Draft	Player	Nationality	Pick no.	Team
2021	Jalen Green	United States	2	Houston Rockets
2021	Jonathan Kuminga	DR Congo	7	Golden State Warriors
2021	Isaiah Todd	United States	31	Milwaukee Bucks
2022	Dyson Daniels	Australia	8	New Orleans Pelicans
2022	MarJon Beauchamp	United States	24	Milwaukee Bucks
2022	Jaden Hardy	United States	37	Sacramento Kings
2023	Scoot Henderson	United States	3	Portland Trail Blazers
2023	Leonard Miller	Canada	33	San Antonio Spurs
2023	Sidy Cissoko	France	44	San Antonio Spurs
2023	Mojave King	New Zealand; United States	47	Los Angeles Lakers
2024	Ron Holland	United States	5	Detroit Pistons
2024	Matas Buzelis	United States; Lithuania	11	Chicago Bulls
2024	Tyler Smith	United States	33	Milwaukee Bucks

List of undrafted G League Ignite players who signed NBA contracts
Draft	Player	Nationality
2021	Daishen Nix	United States
2022	Michael Foster Jr.	United States

== Head coaches ==
#	Head coach	Term	Regular season				Playoffs				Achievements
#	Head coach	Term	G	W	L	Win%	G	W	L	Win%	Achievements
1	Brian Shaw	2020–2021				–				–	
2	Jason Hart	2021–2024				–	—	—	—	—	
