= Steeve Ho You Fat =

French basketball player (born 1988)

Personal information
- Born: 12 June 1988 (age 38) Cayenne, French Guiana
- Listed height: 202 cm (6 ft 8 in)
- Listed weight: 90 kg (198 lb)

Career information
- Playing career: 2008–present
- Position: Power forward

Career history
- 2008–2009: Cholet Basket
- 2009–2011: Olympique Antibes
- 2011–2013: ALM Évreux Basket
- 2013–2014: Cholet Basket
- 2014–2015: Chorale Roanne Basket
- 2015–2016: BC Orchies
- 2016–2017: Rouen Métropole Basket
- 2017–2019: ALM Évreux Basket
- 2019–2021: Chorale Roanne Basket
- 2021–2023: Metropolitans 92
- 2023–2024: Fos Provence Basket
- 2024: Haukar
- 2025: Þór Þorlákshöfn

Steeve Ho You Fat (born 12 June 1988) is a French former professional basketball player whose playing career lasted from 2008 to 2025.

== Early life ==
Ho You Fat was born in French Guiana, where his family business controls shipping at the port of Cayenne; his paternal grandfather was an immigrant from China.

== Playing career ==
Ho You Fat began his basketball career with Cholet Basketball in 2008. He enjoyed his best season in 2018–19, when he averaged 15.6 points per game for ALM Évreux Basket in LNB Pro B.

In 2021 Ho You Fat signed with Metropolitans 92 and he was teammates with future NBA star Victor Wembanyama during his tenure with the team.

On 16 July 2023, Ho You Fat signed with Fos Provence Basket of the Pro B.

On 24 June 2024, Ho You Fat signed with Haukar of the Icelandic Úrvalsdeild karla. He was released by the club on 17 December in a major roster overhaul as the team entered the Christmas break. In 11 regular season games, he averaged 14.5 points, 7.0 rebounds and 1.5 blocks per game.

Ho You Fat remained in the Úrvalsdeild and signed with Þór Þorlákshöfn on 21 January 2025. On 2 February, he suffered a broken kneecap in a game against Haukar and was ruled out for the rest of the season.

On 7 May 2025, Ho You Fat announced his retirement from professional basketball via his Instagram account.
