= Scoot Henderson =

American basketball player (born 2004)

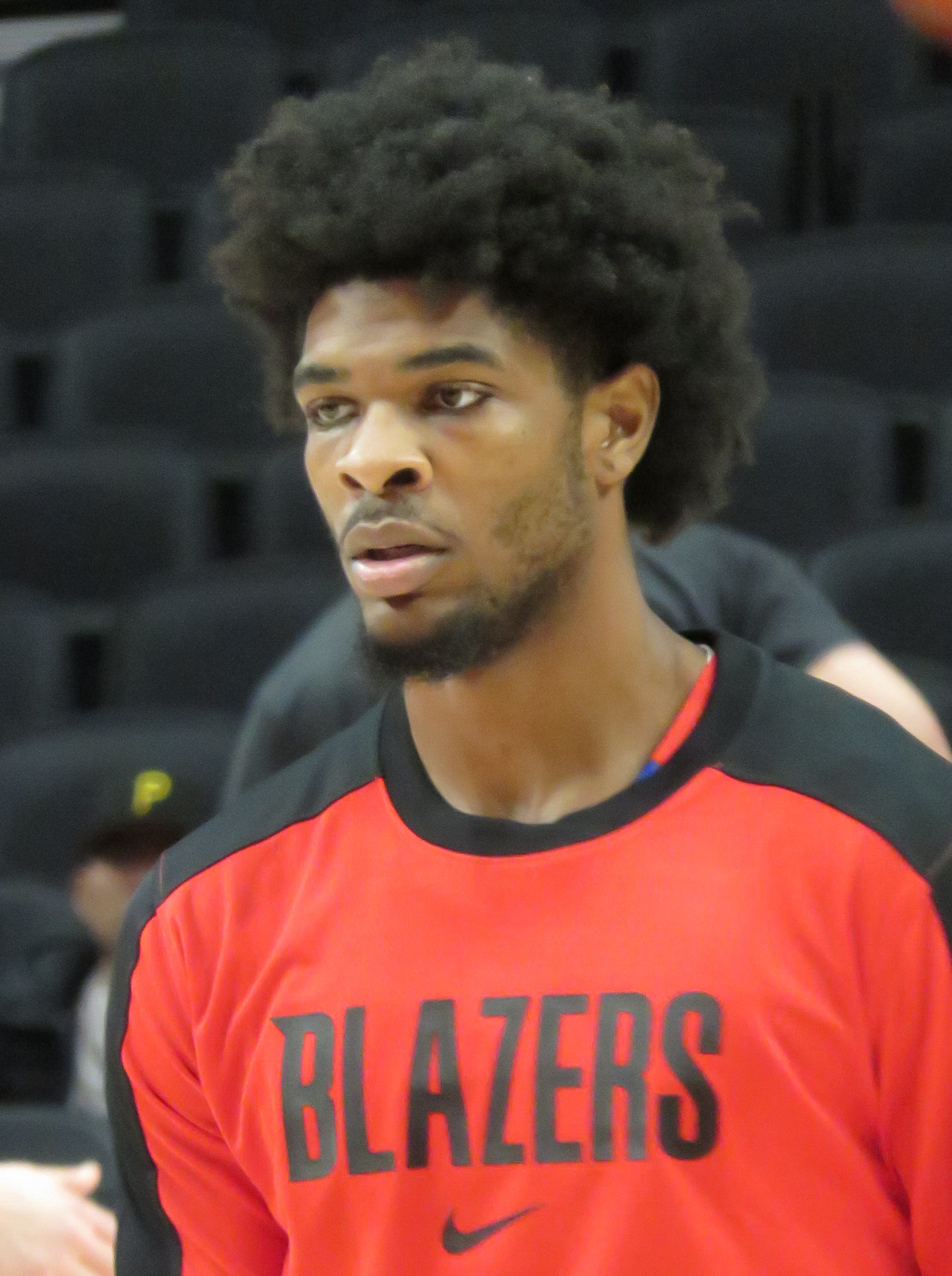
- Henderson in 2024

No. 00 – Portland Trail Blazers
- Position: Point guard
- League: NBA

Personal information
- Born: February 3, 2004 (age 22) Marietta, Georgia, U.S.
- Listed height: 6 ft 3 in (1.91 m)
- Listed weight: 207 lb (94 kg)

Career information
- High school: Carlton J. Kell (Marietta, Georgia)
- NBA draft: 2023: 1st round, 3rd overall pick
- Drafted by: Portland Trail Blazers
- Playing career: 2023–present

Career history
- 2021–2023: NBA G League Ignite
- 2023–present: Portland Trail Blazers

Career highlights
- NBA G League Next Up Game (2023)
- Stats at NBA.com
- Stats at Basketball Reference

Sterling "Scoot" Henderson (born February 3, 2004) is an American professional basketball player for the Portland Trail Blazers of the National Basketball Association (NBA). He played for Carlton J. Kell High School in his hometown of Marietta, Georgia, where he was a five-star recruit. At age 17, Henderson signed with the NBA G League Ignite after graduating early from high school and became the youngest player in G League history. In his second season, he was selected as a captain of the G League Next Up Game. Henderson was drafted with the 3rd pick in the 2023 NBA draft by the Trail Blazers.

== Early life ==
Henderson was born in Marietta, Georgia, to Chris and Crystal Henderson. His father is a coach and trainer, and his mother is a healthcare administrator. His parents run the training facility Next Play 360° in Marietta, where they moved from Hempstead, New York, shortly before Henderson's birth. He is the second youngest of seven siblings, including three sisters who played NCAA Division I basketball, and was nicknamed "Scoot" or "Scoota" because of how he would scoot across the floor as a baby.

== High school career ==
Henderson played basketball for Carlton J. Kell High School in Marietta. During his freshman season, he came off the bench and played alongside his brother, C. J., a senior on the team. In February 2020, during his sophomore season, Henderson scored a then career-high 49 points and made the game-winning shot in a 92–91 overtime win over Miller Grove High School in the first round of the Class 5A state tournament. He led Kell to the semifinals and averaged 24 points, six rebounds, three assists and three steals per game as a sophomore. Henderson was named Class 5A Player of the Year and first-team 5A All-State by The Atlanta Journal-Constitution. On January 22, 2021, as a junior, he scored 53 points in a 94–64 win against Osborne High School, breaking the program single-game and career scoring records. Henderson led Kell to the Class 6A state title game, scoring 29 points in a loss to a Wheeler High School team featuring future top prospect Isaiah Collier. He averaged 32 points, seven rebounds and six assists per game in the season, earning Class 6A Player of the Year and first-team 6A All-State honors from The Atlanta Journal-Constitution. He bypassed his senior season to play professionally. In January 2023, Henderson and his sister, Crystal both had their jerseys retired at Kell. The two of them are the top scorers in school history, with Crystal surpassing Henderson's total during her senior season.

=== Recruiting ===
Henderson was a consensus five-star recruit, and 247Sports ranked him as the second-best point guard in the 2021 class. He drew the attention of NCAA Division I programs at camps following his freshman year of high school. He received his first Division I scholarship offer from Ole Miss and held offers from Florida, Florida State and Georgia Tech by his sophomore season. On May 21, 2021, he announced that he would reclassify to the 2021 class and join the NBA G League Ignite, declining offers from Auburn and Georgia.

College recruiting
Name	Hometown	School	Height	Weight	Commit date
Scoot Henderson; PG	Marietta, GA	Carlton J. Kell (GA)	6 ft 3 in (1.91 m)	181 lb (82 kg)	—
Scoot Henderson; PG	Recruit ratings: Rivals: 247Sports: ESPN: (92)				
Overall recruit ranking: Rivals: 13 247Sports: 10 ESPN: 7
Note: In many cases, Scout, Rivals, 247Sports, On3, and ESPN may conflict in their listings of height and weight.; In these cases, the average was taken. ESPN grades are on a 100-point scale.; Sources:

== Professional career ==
=== NBA G League Ignite (2021–2023) ===
On May 21, 2021, Henderson signed a two-year, $1 million contract with the NBA G League Ignite, a developmental team affiliated with the NBA G League that began in the previous year. He was sidelined to start the season with a rib injury. On November 17, 2021, Henderson made his debut with eight points and six rebounds in a 115–103 win against the South Bay Lakers. At age 17, he became the youngest player in G League history. In his second game, on November 26, Henderson recorded a career-high 31 points, six rebounds and five assists in a 112–110 loss to the Santa Cruz Warriors. In February 2022, he was one of four Ignite players to compete in the Rising Stars Challenge at NBA All-Star Weekend, scoring two points for Team Payton in a 50–48 loss to Team Barry. In the 2021–22 season, he played 11 games in the G League Showcase Cup and 10 exhibition games and averaged 14.3 points, 4.8 rebounds and 4.2 assists per game.

In October 2022, Henderson represented the Ignite in a pair of exhibition games against Victor Wembanyama, the projected first overall pick, and Metropolitans 92. In the first game on October 4, he recorded 28 points, nine assists and five rebounds in a 122–115 win. On October 6, he left the second game after suffering a bone bruise in his right knee during the first quarter, as his team lost, 112–106. On November 12, Henderson posted 18 points, a career-high 16 assists and six rebounds in a 125–115 victory over the Santa Cruz Warriors. Four days later, he recorded a season-high 27 points, five rebounds, five assists and four steals in a 110–95 win against the Oklahoma City Blue. On November 18, Henderson suffered a nasal fracture and concussion and missed 11 games before returning on December 27. On January 10, 2023, he scored 27 points in a 123–122 win over Capitanes de la Ciudad de México. In February, Henderson was named captain of Team Scoot in the inaugural G League Next Up Game. He played for Team Jason Terry in the Rising Stars Challenge at NBA All-Star Weekend, scoring four points in a loss to Team Joakim. On March 14, it was announced that Henderson would not play in the final five games of the season. He averaged 17.6 points, 6.4 assists, 5.1 rebounds and 1.2 steals per game in 25 appearances.

=== Portland Trail Blazers (2023–present) ===
==== 2023–24 season ====
The Portland Trail Blazers selected Henderson with the third overall pick in the 2023 NBA draft. He made his 2023 NBA Summer League debut on July 7 against the Houston Rockets with 15 points, five rebounds and six assists. He left the game early due to a shoulder injury and sat out the rest of Summer League. On October 10, Henderson made his preseason debut, putting up seven points, one rebound and six assists in a 106–66 victory over the New Zealand Breakers. Henderson debuted his first signature shoe during the Blazers' media day. He will be the seventh player in NBA history to wear a signature shoe in their debut game. On October 25, Henderson made his NBA regular-season debut, putting up 11 points and four assists in a 123–111 loss to the Los Angeles Clippers. On November 1, Henderson suffered a sprained right ankle and bone bruise against the Detroit Pistons and was sidelined for an unknown amount of time until November 21, where he was assigned to G League affiliate Rip City Remix to return to court conditioning. On December 14, Henderson had a career-high 10 assists in a 122–114 loss to the Utah Jazz. On January 14, Henderson put up a career-high 33 points along with nine assists in a 127–116 loss to the Phoenix Suns. On March 29, Henderson recorded the then-worst plus–minus in NBA history, later surpassed by Cody Williams with a minus 58 in a 142–82 loss to the Miami Heat.

==== 2024–25 season ====
During his second season, on January 14, 2025 Henderson put up a new career-high 39 points along with six assists in a 132–114 loss to the Brooklyn Nets. He made 66 appearances (10 starts) for Portland during the 2024–25 NBA season, averaging 12.7 points, 3.0 rebounds and 5.1 assists.

==== 2025–26 season ====
On September 26, 2025, Henderson was ruled out for at least one-to-two months after suffering a left hamstring tear during a workout. On February 6, 2026, Henderson made his season debut, scoring 11 points, five rebounds and nine assists in a 135–115 victory over the Memphis Grizzlies.

On April 22, 2026, Henderson scored a game-high 31 points in a game-two win against the San Antonio Spurs in the first round of the 2026 NBA playoffs, becoming the youngest Trail Blazer to score at least 30 points in a playoff game.

== Career statistics ==
Legend
GP	Games played	GS	Games started	MPG	Minutes per game
FG%	Field goal percentage	3P%	3-point field goal percentage	FT%	Free throw percentage
RPG	Rebounds per game	APG	Assists per game	SPG	Steals per game
BPG	Blocks per game	PPG	Points per game	**Bold**	Career high

=== NBA ===
==== Regular season ====
Year	Team	GP	GS	MPG	FG%	3P%	FT%	RPG	APG	SPG	BPG	PPG
2023–24	Portland	62	**32**	**28.5**	.385	.325	.819	**3.1**	**5.4**	.8	.2	14.0
2024–25	Portland	**66**	10	26.7	**.419**	**.354**	.767	3.0	5.1	**1.0**	.2	12.7
2025–26	Portland	30	10	24.9	.418	.352	**.840**	2.7	3.7	.9	**.3**	**14.2**
Career		158	52	27.0	.404	.344	.802	3.0	5.0	.9	.2	13.5

==== Playoffs ====
Year	Team	GP	GS	MPG	FG%	3P%	FT%	RPG	APG	SPG	BPG	PPG
2026	Portland	5	5	29.0	.475	.464	.750	1.6	1.2	.8	.2	15.0
Career		5	5	29.0	.475	.464	.750	1.6	1.2	.8	.2	15.0

=== NBA G League ===
Year	Team	GP	GS	MPG	FG%	3P%	FT%	RPG	APG	SPG	BPG	PPG
2021–22	NBA G League Ignite	10	4	31.5	.460	.250	.778	4.6	4.8	1.6	.3	14.7
2022–23	NBA G League Ignite	19	18	30.7	.429	.275	.764	5.4	6.5	1.1	.5	16.5
Career		29	22	31.1	.445	.263	.771	5.0	5.7	1.6	.4	15.6

== Off the court ==
On June 15, 2022, Henderson signed a multi-year endorsement deal with Puma. In 2022, Henderson applied for trademarks on his name and his motto, "Overly Determined to Dominate." In the same year, he launched his own boys' and girls' Amateur Athletic Union programs. Henderson starred in Shooting Stars (2023), where he portrayed Romeo Travis.
