= Mojave King =

New Zealand-American basketball player (born 2002)

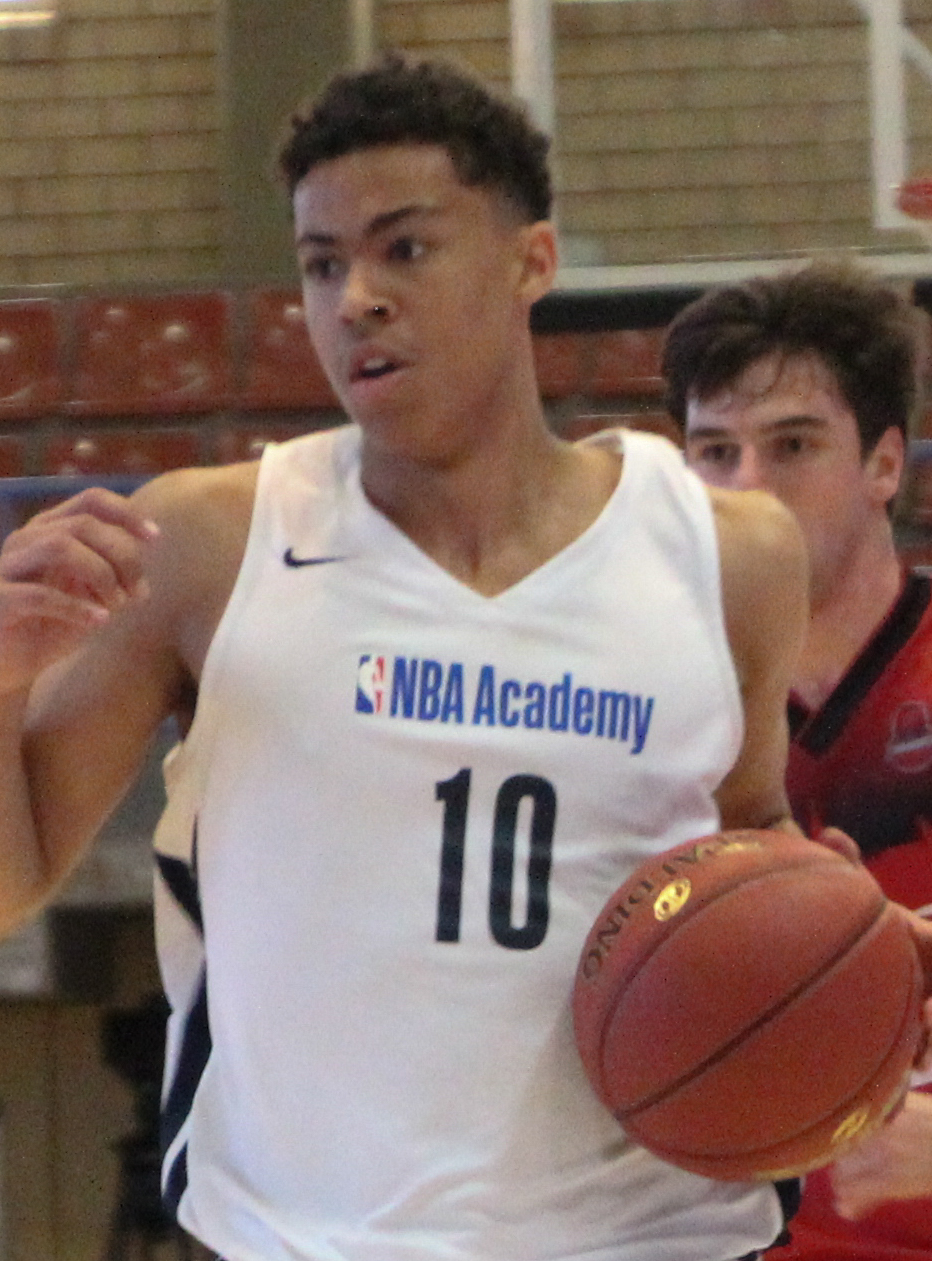
- King with the NBA Global Academy in 2020

No. 9 – New Zealand Breakers
- Position: Shooting guard
- League: NBL

Personal information
- Born: 11 June 2002 (age 24) Dunedin, New Zealand
- Listed height: 6 ft 5 in (1.96 m)
- Listed weight: 195 lb (88 kg)

Career information
- High school: Brisbane State (Brisbane, Queensland)
- NBA draft: 2023: 2nd round, 47th overall pick
- Drafted by: Los Angeles Lakers
- Playing career: 2018–present

Career history
- 2018: Brisbane Capitals
- 2019: BA Centre of Excellence
- 2020–2021: Cairns Taipans
- 2021–2022: Adelaide 36ers
- 2022: Southland Sharks
- 2022–2023: NBA G League Ignite
- 2023–2024: Indiana Mad Ants
- 2024–2025: New Zealand Breakers
- 2025: Cangrejeros de Santurce
- 2025: Tauranga Whai
- 2025–2026: Cairns Taipans
- 2026: Mykonos
- 2026–present: New Zealand Breakers

Career highlights
- NBA G League Next Up Game (2023)
- Stats at NBA.com
- Stats at Basketball Reference

Mojave Jackson King (/məˈhɑːvi/ mə-HAH-vee; born 11 June 2002) is a New Zealand-American professional basketball player for the New Zealand Breakers of the National Basketball League (NBL). He began his career in the NBL in 2020, playing his first season for the Cairns Taipans. After a season with the Adelaide 36ers, he joined the NBA G League Ignite in 2022. He was selected by the Los Angeles Lakers with the 47th overall pick in the 2023 NBA draft.

== Early life and career ==
King was born in Dunedin, New Zealand. He was named after the Mojave Desert in the southwestern United States.

In 2007, at the age of four, King moved with his family to Mackay, Queensland, when his father accepted a role to coach the Mackay Meteors in Australia's semi-professional Queensland Basketball League (QBL). The family settled in Brisbane four years later when King's father accepted a position to coach the Brisbane Spartans in the South East Australian Basketball League. There he attended Brisbane State High School.

In 2018, King played one game in the QBL for the Brisbane Capitals.

In 2019, King joined the NBA Global Academy, a training centre at the Australian Institute of Sport in Canberra. In association with the academy, he played for the BA Centre of Excellence in the NBL1, an Australian semi-professional league. Later that year, King represented Queensland South at the Australian Under-18 Championships, where he led the competition in scoring with 26.6 points per game. At the NBA Academy Games in Atlanta, Georgia in July 2019, he averaged a tournament-high 19.2 points per game.

== Professional career ==
=== Cairns Taipans (2020–2021) ===
On 12 March 2020, at the age of 17, King signed with the Cairns Taipans of the National Basketball League (NBL) as a part of the league's Next Stars program to develop NBA draft prospects. By joining the NBL, he turned down offers from several NCAA Division I programs, including Arizona, Baylor, Oregon and Virginia. During the 2020–21 season, King averaged 6.2 points and 2.4 rebounds.

=== Adelaide 36ers (2021–2022) ===
On 14 July 2021, King was transferred to the Adelaide 36ers for the final year of his Next Stars contract.

=== Southland Sharks (2022) ===
On 19 April 2022, King signed with the Southland Sharks for the 2022 New Zealand NBL season.

=== NBA G League Ignite (2022–2023) ===
On 7 September 2022, King signed a contract with the NBA G League Ignite. He was named to the G League's inaugural Next Up Game for the 2022–23 season.

=== Indiana Mad Ants (2023–2024) ===
King was selected with the 47th overall pick in the 2023 NBA draft by the Los Angeles Lakers. His draft rights were then immediately traded to the Indiana Pacers. He became just the third New Zealand-born player to be picked in the NBA draft, following Sean Marks and Steven Adams. He subsequently played for the Pacers in the 2023 NBA Summer League. In October 2023, he joined the Indiana Mad Ants, the Pacers' NBA G League affiliate. He appeared in 15 games for the Mad Ants in the 2023–24 NBA G League season, averaging 3.9 points in 8.9 minutes per game.

=== New Zealand Breakers (2024–2025) ===
On 18 April 2024, King signed with the New Zealand Breakers for the 2024–25 NBL season. On 7 January 2025, he was ruled out for four weeks due to a calf injury.

=== Cangrejeros de Santurce (2025) ===
In March 2025, King signed with Cangrejeros de Santurce of the Baloncesto Superior Nacional for the 2025 season. He left the team in April after appearing in seven games.

=== Tauranga Whai (2025) ===
On 16 May 2025, King signed with the Tauranga Whai for the rest of the 2025 New Zealand NBL season. On 29 June 2025, he scored 43 points in the Whai's 98–88 loss to the Southland Sharks.

In September 2025, King joined Greek team Panathinaikos as a complementary player for the Pavlos Giannakopoulos Tournament in Melbourne.

=== Return to Cairns (2025–2026) ===
On 29 October 2025, King signed with the Cairns Taipans as an injury replacement for Alex Higgins-Titsha, returning to the team for a second stint. In just his third game for the Taipans on 7 November, King had the best game of his 76-game NBL career with 32 points on 13-of-16 shooting and 6-of-8 from 3-point range in a 107–90 loss to the Illawarra Hawks.

=== Mykonos (2026) ===
On 7 March 2026, King signed with Mykonos of the Greek Basketball League.

=== Return to New Zealand Breakers (2026–present) ===
On 16 September 2026, King signed with the New Zealand Breakers as a nominated injury replacement for Josiah-Jordan James to start the 2026–27 NBL season.

=== NBA draft rights ===
On 17 June 2025, King's draft rights were traded by the Indiana Pacers to the New Orleans Pelicans. King's draft rights were then traded to the Houston Rockets on 6 July 2025.

== National team ==
In July 2025, King was named in his first New Zealand Tall Blacks squad ahead of the 2025 FIBA Asia Cup. In November 2025, he was named in the Tall Blacks squad for the first window of the FIBA Basketball World Cup 2027 Asian Qualifiers. In June 2026, he was named in the squad for two more Asian qualifiers, but was later replaced. In November 2026, he was named in the squad for two more Asian qualifiers.

== Personal life ==
King is the son of Leonard and Tracey King (née Paul). His father is from the United States and played for the Florida A & M University Rattlers in college; in New Zealand; and, he coached in Australia. His mother is a New Zealand native and played NCAA basketball for Duquesne. His older sister, Tylah, played for Pacific in the NCAA. King's maternal grandfather, John Paul, coached basketball in Otago for over 50 years and is one of the region's most prominent basketball figures.

=== Nationality and citizenship ===
King is a dual citizen of New Zealand and the United States. As of 2019, he did not hold an Australian passport, but signalled at the time his intentions to represent the Australian national team. He later chose to represent New Zealand.
