= Jusuf Nurkić =

Bosnian basketball player (born 1994)

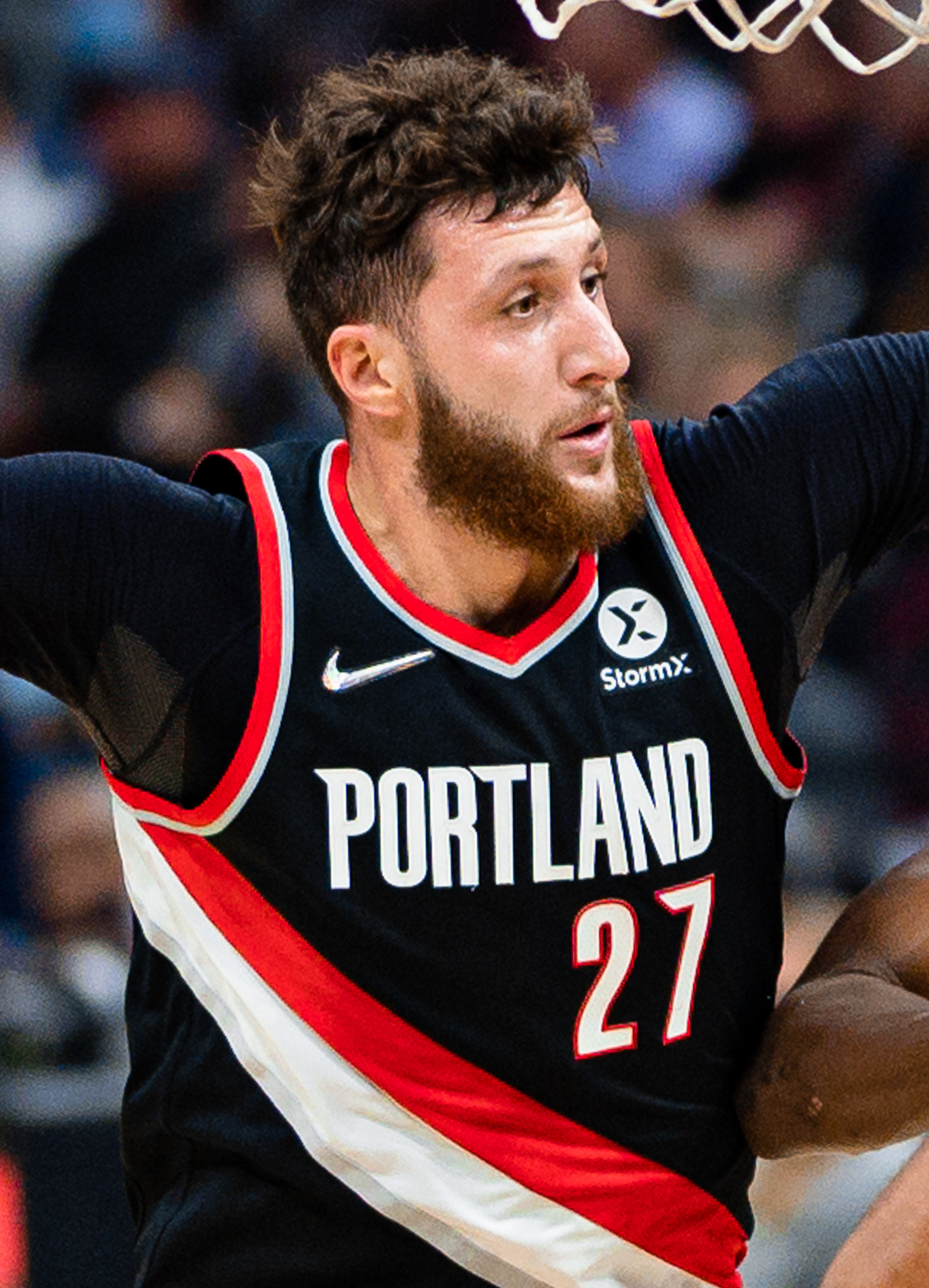
- Nurkić with the Portland Trail Blazers in 2021

No. 30 – Utah Jazz
- Position: Center
- League: NBA

Personal information
- Born: 23 August 1994 (age 32) Živinice, Bosnia and Herzegovina
- Listed height: 7 ft 0 in (2.13 m)
- Listed weight: 290 lb (132 kg)

Career information
- NBA draft: 2014: 1st round, 16th overall pick
- Drafted by: Chicago Bulls
- Playing career: 2012–present

Career history
- 2012–2014: Cedevita
- 2013: →Zadar
- 2014–2017: Denver Nuggets
- 2017–2023: Portland Trail Blazers
- 2023–2025: Phoenix Suns
- 2025: Charlotte Hornets
- 2025–present: Utah Jazz

Career highlights
- NBA All-Rookie Second Team (2015); Croatian League champion (2014); Croatian League Finals MVP (2014); All-Croatian League Second Team (2014)
- Stats at NBA.com
- Stats at Basketball Reference

Jusuf Nurkić (/jusuf ˈnʊərkitʃ/ YOO-soof NURR-kitch; born 23 August 1994) is a Bosnian professional basketball player for the Utah Jazz of the National Basketball Association (NBA). He also represents the senior Bosnia and Herzegovina national team. Nurkić was selected by the Chicago Bulls with the 16th overall pick in the 2014 NBA draft, before being traded to the Denver Nuggets on draft night. He has also played for the Portland Trail Blazers, Phoenix Suns, and Charlotte Hornets.

== Early career ==
Nurkić was born on 23 August 1994 in Živinice, Bosnia and Herzegovina. He began playing basketball at age 14 after Bosnian sports agent Enes Trnovčević took Nurkić to Slovenia and gave him an opportunity to play. Nurkić played in the youth categories for Slovenian team Zlatorog Laško. In February 2012, he was briefly loaned to Union Olimpija in order to play the Nike International Junior Tournament, which was held in Belgrade. Nurkić attracted attention internationally by averaging 18.8 points and 11.0 rebounds in five games. Shortly after the tournament, he parted ways with Zlatorog Laško. Just days after, it was revealed that Nurkić was training with Croatian team Cedevita.

== Professional career ==
=== Cedevita Zagreb (2012–2014) ===
In October 2012, after a few months of training with Croatian team Cedevita, Nurkić signed a contract with Cedevita Zagreb. In his first season with Cedevita, Nurkić had a small role in the team under head coach Aleksandar Petrović, mostly playing in garbage time. In the Euroleague, Nurkić played in only six games, averaging 1.8 points per game. In January 2013, he was loaned to Zadar until the end of the season on his initiative, hoping to play more minutes. In Nurkić's second season under new head coach Jasmin Repeša, he had breakthroughs in the regional Adriatic League, averaging 11.6 points and 5.6 rebounds per game, for only 16.3 minutes spent on the court. This was attributed mainly to foul troubles and conditioning issues.

In 2014, Nurkić was nominated for the FIBA Europe Young Player of the Year Award.

=== Denver Nuggets (2014–2017) ===
On 26 June 2014, Nurkić was selected by the Chicago Bulls with the 16th overall pick in the 2014 NBA draft. He was later traded to the Denver Nuggets on draft night. On 31 July, Nurkić signed his rookie scale contract with the Nuggets.

On 29 October 2014, Nurkić made his NBA debut, recording five points and seven rebounds in an 89–79 victory over the Detroit Pistons. On 1 January 2015, Nurkić had his first career double-double with 10 points and 10 rebounds in a 106–101 loss to the Chicago Bulls. Two days later, Nurkić recorded his second career double-double with 11 points and 10 rebounds to go along with five blocks in a 114–85 victory over the Memphis Grizzlies. Nurkić went on to record two more double-doubles in February. He was named a participant in the 2015 Rising Stars Challenge as a replacement for Steven Adams of the Oklahoma City Thunder, but declined to play in the event for personal reasons. During the regular-season finale against the Golden State Warriors, Nurkić scored a season-high 17 points in the 133–126 loss. On 20 May, he underwent successful surgery to repair a partially torn left patellar tendon.

On 11 October 2015, the Nuggets exercised their third-year team option on Nurkić's rookie scale contract, extending the contract through the 2016–17 season. After being inactive for the first two months of the season due to recovering from his torn left patellar tendon, Nurkić made his 2015–16 season debut on 2 January against the Warriors and finished the 111–108 overtime loss with three points and two rebounds. Four days later, Nurkić had 15 points, 10 rebounds, and five blocks in a 78–74 victory over the Minnesota Timberwolves. On 12 March, he scored a season-high 17 points in a 116–100 victory over the Washington Wizards. Nurkić topped that mark twice in late March, scoring 18 points against the Los Angeles Lakers on 25 March, and 19 points against the Los Angeles Clippers on 27 March. On 8 April, he scored a career-high 21 points in a 102–98 victory over the San Antonio Spurs.

In the Nuggets' 2016–17 season opener on 26 October 2016, Nurkić set a new career high with 23 points in a 107–102 victory over the New Orleans Pelicans. Five days later, he had 13 points and a career-high 18 rebounds in a 105–102 loss to the Toronto Raptors. After Nikola Jokić emerged as Denver's starting center, Nurkić was demoted to the bench. The demotion to the bench did not sit well with Nurkić, and he was not afraid to voice his displeasure with the situation, requesting to be traded twice, first in April 2016 and then again in December 2016. The Nuggets eventually granted Nurkić his wish 10 days before the 2017 trade deadline.

=== Portland Trail Blazers (2017–2023) ===
==== First years in Portland (2017–2019) ====
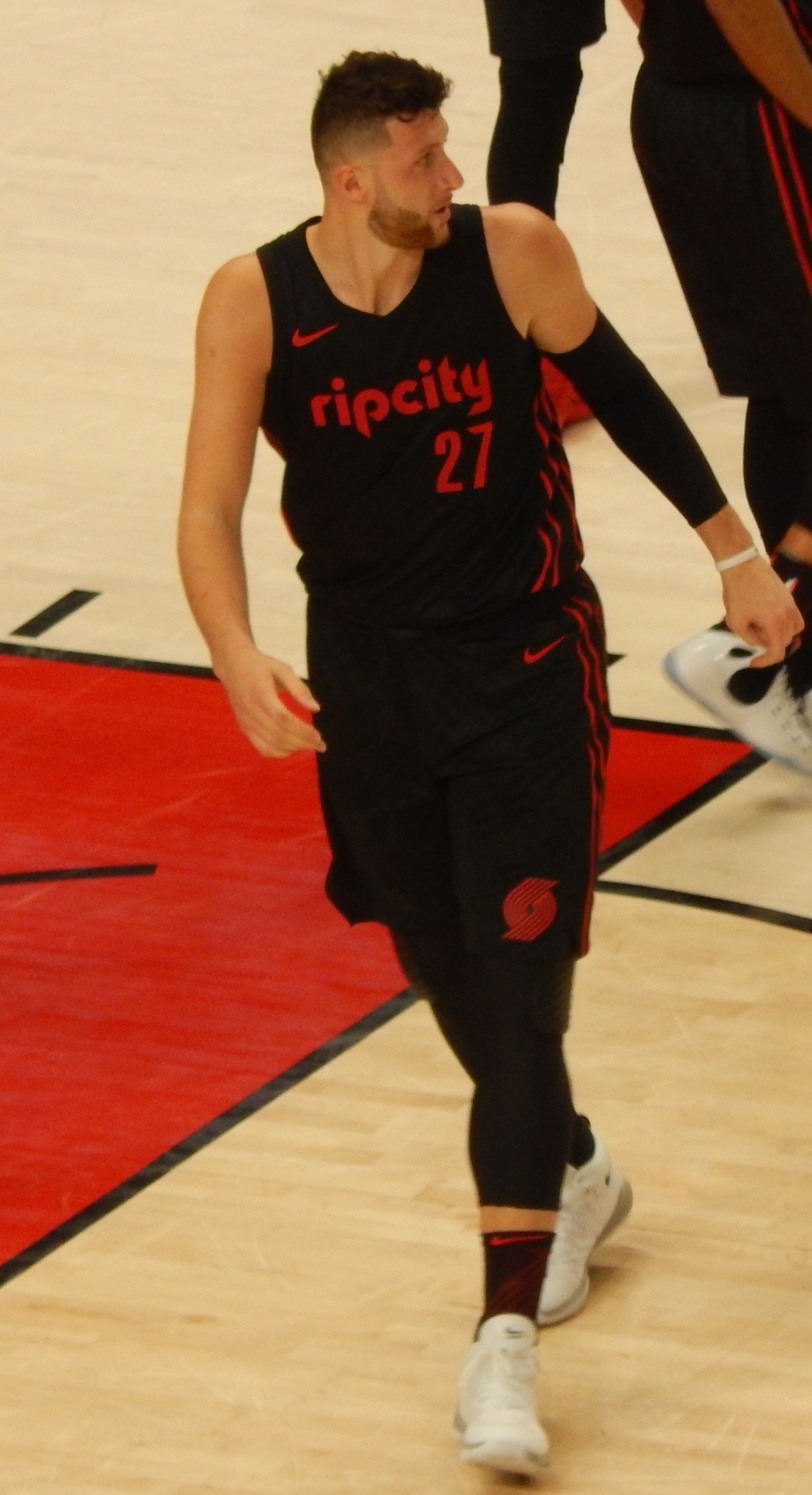
Nurkić in 2018

On 13 February 2017, Nurkić was traded, along with the rights to the Memphis Grizzlies' 2017 first round draft pick, to the Portland Trail Blazers in exchange for Mason Plumlee, a 2018 second round pick and cash considerations.

Nurkić made his debut for the Trail Blazers on 15 February, recording 13 points and seven rebounds in 21 minutes off the bench in a 111–88 loss to the Utah Jazz. Nurkić made his first start for the Trail Blazers in the next game eight days later following the NBA All-Star break, recording 12 points and 12 rebounds in a 112–103 victory over the Orlando Magic. On 2 March, he had 18 points, 12 rebounds, a career-high six assists, and five blocks in a 114–109 victory over the Oklahoma City Thunder. Exactly a week later, Nurkić had a career-high 28 points and 20 rebounds in a 114–108 overtime victory over the Philadelphia 76ers. He also had eight assists and six blocks, becoming the first NBA player to post at least 28 points, 20 rebounds, eight assists, and six blocks in a game since Charles Barkley pulled the feat in November 1986. On 28 March, Nurkić set a new career high with 33 points to go along with 15 rebounds in a 122–113 victory over his former team, the Nuggets. Three days later, Nurkić was ruled out for the rest of the regular season with a non-displaced fracture in his right leg.

On 22 April 2017, Nurkić returned to action in Game 3 of the Trail Blazers' first-round playoff series against the Golden State Warriors, after having missed the final seven games of the regular season and the first two playoff games at Golden State. He finished the 119–113 loss with two points and 11 rebounds as the Trail Blazers went down 3–0 in the series. Nurkić went on to miss Game 4 of the series, as the Trail Blazers bowed out of the playoffs with a 4–0 series loss to the Warriors.

On 24 November 2017, Nurkić recorded 29 points and 15 rebounds in a 127–125 victory over the Brooklyn Nets. On 18 January 2018, he had 19 points and a season-high 17 rebounds in a 100–86 victory over the Indiana Pacers. On 9 April, Nurkić recorded 20 points and 19 rebounds in an 88–82 loss to the Nuggets. In Game 4 of the Trail Blazers' first-round playoff series against the New Orleans Pelicans, Nurkić had 18 points and 11 rebounds in a 131–123 loss. The loss eliminated Portland from the playoffs, as they lost the series in a four-game sweep.

On 6 July 2018, Nurkić re-signed with the Trail Blazers. On 22 October, he recorded 22 points and 18 rebounds in a narrow 125–124 overtime loss to the Washington Wizards. On 18 November, Nurkić had 13 points, 14 rebounds, and matched his career high with eight assists in a 119–109 victory over the Wizards. Two days later, Nurkić recorded 13 points and 11 rebounds in a 118–114 victory over the New York Knicks, thus recording his career-best fifth straight double-double. On 27 December, Nurkić had 27 points and 12 rebounds in a narrow 110–109 overtime victory over the Warriors.

On 1 January 2019, Nurkić logged a career-high 23 rebounds in a 113–108 overtime win against the Sacramento Kings, while also putting up an impressive stat line of 24 points, seven assists, five blocks, and five steals in that game. This performance marked a historic milestone, as it was the first ever game since the official recording of steals and blocks in 1973, where a player achieved 20+ points, 20+ rebounds, 5+ assists, 5+ blocks, and 5+ steals for an official 5x5. Ten days later, Nurkić had 11 points, 11 rebounds, and tied career highs with eight assists and six blocks in a 127–96 victory over the Charlotte Hornets, becoming the third player in NBA history to record such a stat line in fewer than 30 minutes. On 16 January, he recorded his first career triple-double with 10 points, 10 rebounds, and 10 assists in a 129–112 victory over the Cleveland Cavaliers.

==== Injury-plagued seasons (2019–2023) ====
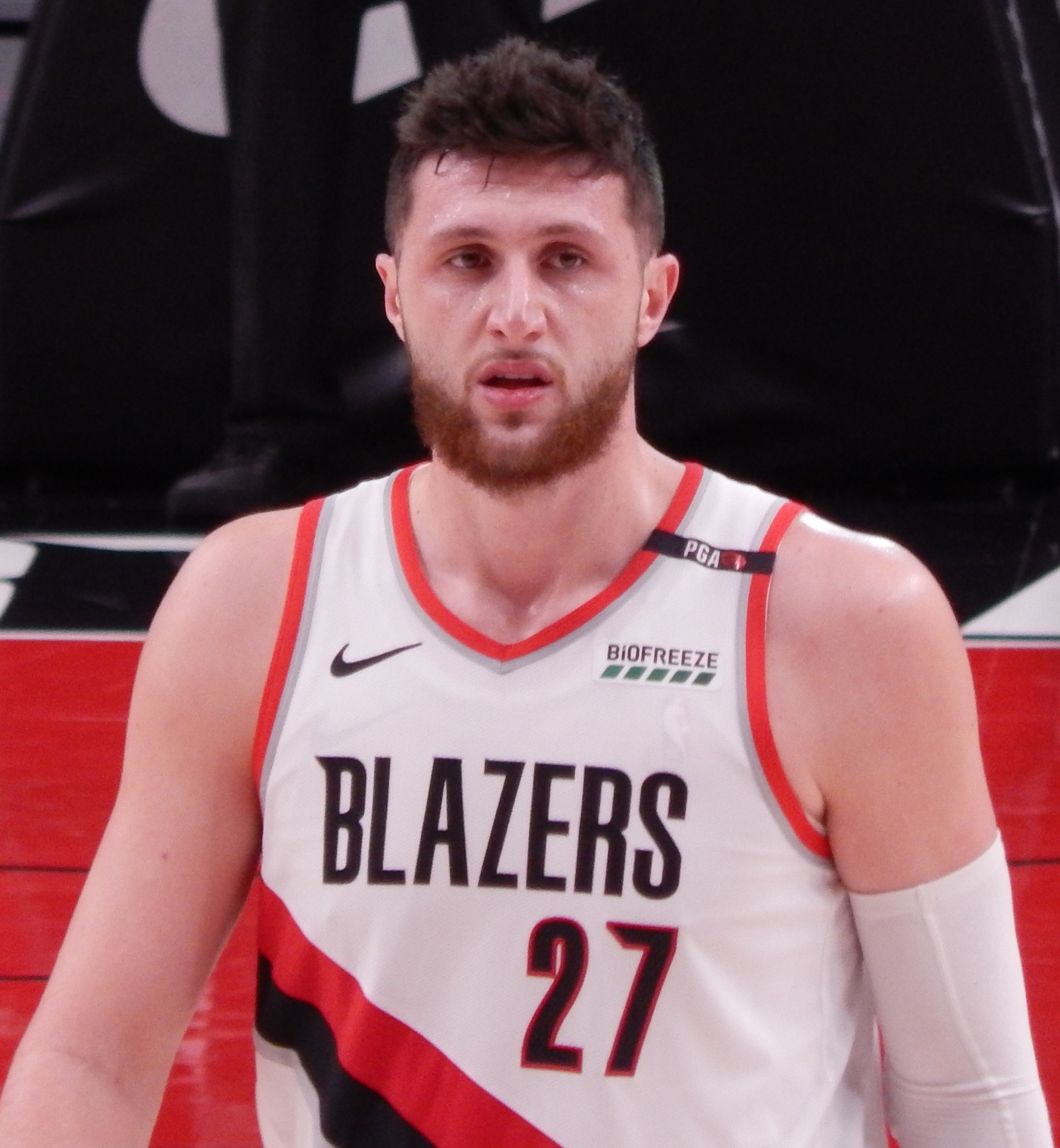
Nurkić in 2019

On 25 March 2019, Nurkić suffered a compound fracture of his left tibia and fibula in the second overtime of the Portland Trail Blazers 148–144 victory over the Brooklyn Nets. Nurkić had a season-high 32 points and 16 rebounds before the injury. The Trail Blazers confirmed that it was a season-ending injury the same night.

Nurkic was expected to return from his injury on 15 March 2020. However, with the suspension of the 2019–20 NBA season due to the COVID-19 pandemic, Nurkić did not make his return until 31 July, in a 140–135 overtime victory over the Memphis Grizzlies, where he recorded 18 points, nine rebounds, and six blocks.

On 14 January 2021, Nurkić fractured his right wrist in a 111–87 blowout loss to the Indiana Pacers. Nurkić returned on 26 March, recording eight points and eight rebounds in a 112–105 victory over the Orlando Magic. On 23 April, he logged a season-high 26 points in a 130–128 loss to the Memphis Grizzlies.

On 6 January 2022, during the fourth quarter of a 115–109 loss to the Miami Heat, Nurkić was ejected from the game after an altercation with Heat guard Tyler Herro. The next day, the NBA fined both Nurkić and Herro $25,000 each for the incident. On 22 January, Nurkic scored 29 points, including a go-ahead basket with 13 seconds left, and grabbed 17 rebounds in a 109–105 victory over the Boston Celtics. On 22 March, he was fined $40,000 by the NBA for a confrontation with a fan two days earlier after a 129–98 blowout loss to the Indiana Pacers, during which Nurkić threw the fan's phone into the stands. Six days later, Nurkić was ruled out for the remainder of the season with plantar fasciitis in his left foot.

On 6 July 2022, Nurkić re-signed with the Trail Blazers on a four-year, $70 million contract.

=== Phoenix Suns (2023–2025) ===
On 27 September 2023, Nurkić, alongside Grayson Allen, Nassir Little, and Keon Johnson was traded to the Phoenix Suns as part of a three-team trade that sent Damian Lillard to the Milwaukee Bucks and Jrue Holiday, Deandre Ayton, Toumani Camara and a 2029 first-round draft pick to the Trail Blazers.

Nurkić made his Suns debut on 24 October, recording a double-double of 14 points and 14 rebounds, including a game-securing driving lay-up, in a 108–104 victory over the Golden State Warriors. On 8 November, Nurkić recorded 20 points, 17 rebounds, and eight assists alongside a game-winning floater in a narrow 116–115 overtime victory over the Chicago Bulls.

On 3 March 2024, Nurkić recorded a career-high 31 rebounds alongside 14 points in a 118–110 loss to the Oklahoma City Thunder, marking the most rebounds in a game by a player since 2010. He also broke the Suns franchise record for most rebounds by a player in a game, which was previously held by Tyson Chandler.

On 28 December 2024, Nurkić was suspended for three games without pay for an altercation involving both Naji Marshall and P. J. Washington during a game against the Dallas Mavericks. With the Suns sitting at 15–18 to begin the 2025 part of their 2024–25 campaign, the Suns elected to move Nurkić to the bench in favor of Mason Plumlee, beginning with their 6 January 2025 game against the Philadelphia 76ers. He would later miss out on playing time altogether starting on their 9 January game against the Atlanta Hawks as well.

=== Charlotte Hornets (2025) ===
On 6 February 2025, Nurkić was traded to the Charlotte Hornets alongside a 2026 first-round pick in exchange for Cody Martin, Vasilije Micić, and a 2026 second-round pick.

=== Utah Jazz (2025–present) ===
On 29 June 2025, Nurkić was traded to the Utah Jazz in exchange for Collin Sexton and a 2030 second-round pick.

On 25 January 2026, Nurkić became the first player in franchise history to record three triple doubles in a row. He made 41 total appearances (including 36 starts) for the Jazz, averaging 10.9 points, 10.4 rebounds, and 4.8 assists. On 23 February, it was announced that Nurkić would be undergoing a season-ending nose surgery.

On 29 June 2026, Nurkić re-signed with the Jazz on a two-year, $22 million contract.

== National team career ==
Playing for Bosnia and Herzegovina, Nurkić was named MVP of the FIBA Europe Under-18 Championship Division B held in 2012, where he averaged 19.4 points and 13.3 rebounds per game. Nurkić was also the MVP of the FIBA Europe Under-20 Championship Division B, held in 2014, where he averaged 21.4 points and 12.0 rebounds per game. Nurkić played a minor role in the senior team of Bosnia and Herzegovina during the FIBA EuroBasket 2013 qualification, but did not make the squad for the final tournament due to the conflict with the board of Bosnian National Basketball Association. Nurkić represented the senior Bosnia and Herzegovina national basketball team during Eurobasket 2017 qualification. He averaged 19.2 points, 13.5 rebounds, and 1.0 blocks per game.

Nurkić represented Bosnia and Herzegovina at EuroBasket 2022, where the team was eliminated in the group stage. He helped his country get a "shock win", 97–93, against the defending champions Slovenia. Nurkić averaged 16.2 points and 7.0 rebounds over the tournament.

== Career statistics ==
Legend
GP	Games played	GS	Games started	MPG	Minutes per game
FG%	Field-goal percentage	3P%	3-point field-goal percentage	FT%	Free-throw percentage
RPG	Rebounds per game	APG	Assists per game	SPG	Steals per game
BPG	Blocks per game	PPG	Points per game	PIR	Performance index rating
**Bold**	Career high

=== NBA ===
==== Regular season ====
Year	Team	GP	GS	MPG	FG%	3P%	FT%	RPG	APG	SPG	BPG	PPG
2014–15	Denver	62	27	17.8	.446	.000	.636	6.2	.8	.8	1.1	6.9
2015–16	Denver	32	3	17.1	.417	.000	.616	5.5	1.3	.8	1.4	8.2
2016–17	Denver	45	29	17.9	.507	.000	.496	5.8	1.3	.6	.8	8.0
2016–17	Portland	20	19	29.2	.508	.000	.660	10.4	3.2	1.3	1.9	15.2
2017–18	Portland	**79**	**79**	26.4	.505	.000	.630	9.0	1.8	.8	1.4	14.3
2018–19	Portland	72	72	27.4	.508	.103	.773	10.4	3.2	1.0	1.4	15.6
2019–20	Portland	8	8	**31.6**	.495	.200	**.886**	10.3	4.0	**1.4**	**2.0**	**17.6**
2020–21	Portland	37	37	23.8	.514	**.400**	.619	9.0	3.4	1.0	1.1	11.5
2021–22	Portland	56	56	28.2	**.535**	.268	.690	**11.1**	2.8	1.1	.6	15.0
2022–23	Portland	52	52	26.8	.519	.361	.661	9.1	2.9	.8	.8	13.3
2023–24	Phoenix	76	76	27.3	.510	.244	.640	11.0	4.0	1.1	1.1	10.9
2024–25	Phoenix	25	23	23.7	.454	.322	.696	9.2	1.9	.9	.6	8.6
2024–25	Charlotte	26	9	18.1	.497	.283	.627	6.5	2.6	.7	.7	9.2
2025–26	Utah	41	36	26.4	.503	.352	.549	10.4	**4.8**	1.3	.5	10.9
Career		631	526	24.5	.502	.294	.661	8.9	2.6	.9	1.1	11.8

==== Playoffs ====
Year	Team	GP	GS	MPG	FG%	3P%	FT%	RPG	APG	SPG	BPG	PPG
2017	Portland	1	1	16.7	.333	.000	.000	**11.0**	**4.0**	.0	1.0	2.0
2018	Portland	4	4	23.4	.487	—	**.818**	8.0	1.0	**1.5**	1.3	11.8
2020	Portland	5	5	**32.3**	.439	**.273**	.783	10.4	3.6	1.4	.2	**14.2**
2021	Portland	**6**	**6**	28.9	**.545**	.200	.720	10.3	2.7	.5	1.2	13.2
2024	Phoenix	4	4	25.9	.500	.000	.455	8.3	2.8	**1.5**	**1.5**	7.8
Career		20	20	27.4	.489	.211	.714	9.5	2.7	1.1	1.0	11.5

=== EuroLeague ===
Year	Team	GP	GS	MPG	FG%	3P%	FT%	RPG	APG	SPG	BPG	PPG	PIR
2012–13	Cedevita	6	0	3.7	.625	1.000	.000	.7	.0	.2	.5	1.8	2.0
Career		6	0	3.7	.625	1.000	.000	.7	.0	.2	.5	1.8	2.0

=== Domestic leagues ===
Season	Team	League	GP	MPG	FG%	3P%	FT%	RPG	APG	SPG	BPG	PPG
2012–13	Cedevita Zagreb	Adriatic League	5	6.8	.750	.000	.500	1.0	.2	.0	.0	2.6
2012–13	KK Zadar	Adriatic League	9	6.6	.579	.000	.600	2.0	.6	.3	.4	4.1
2012–13	KK Zadar	Croatia A-1 Liga	19	13.3	.495	.000	.691	4.4	.5	.8	.9	8.1
2013–14	Cedevita Zagreb	Adriatic League	28	16.6	.560	.143	.701	5.7	.7	1.1	.8	11.7
2013–14	Cedevita Zagreb	Croatia A-1 Liga	15	16.5	.551	.000	.614	5.3	1.0	.7	1.2	11.5

== Personal life ==
Nurkić's father, Hariz, is a police officer in Bosnia and Herzegovina and as first noted by some of the Denver Nuggets' broadcasters, he stands at a similar height to Jusuf at 7 feet (2.13 m) tall, but weighs over 400 pounds (181 kg). In an interview with ESPN's Rachel Nichols, Nurkić confirmed his father's enormous physical stature and noted that his younger brother, at the age of 13, is already engaged in basketball, donning size 16 shoes, and is looking to play collegiately in the United States once he reaches that education level.

Nurkić is a practicing Muslim. On 12 April 2021, he sparked controversy in former Yugoslavia after marking the beginning of Ramadan by tweeting an image of the Meštrović Pavilion in 1944, when it was converted into a mosque by the Ustaše regime in the Independent State of Croatia, a Nazi puppet state established in the occupied Yugoslavia. During that time, the Pavilion bore the name of Croatian fascist dictator and genocide perpetrator, Poglavnik Ante Pavelić (Džamija poglavnika Ante Pavelića, transl. the Poglavnik Ante Pavelić Mosque).

== See also ==
- List of NBA single-game rebounding leaders
- List of European basketball players in the United States
