= Bol Bol =

South Sudanese-American basketball player (born 1999)

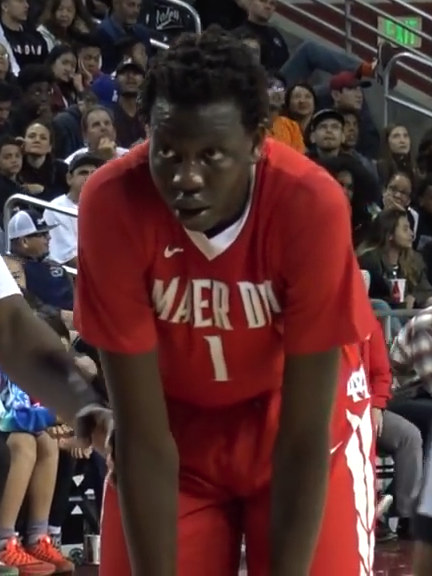
- Bol with Mater Dei High in 2017

Free agent
- Position: Center / power forward

Personal information
- Born: November 16, 1999 (age 26) Khartoum, Sudan
- Listed height: 7 ft 3 in (2.21 m)
- Listed weight: 220 lb (100 kg)

Career information
- High school: Blue Valley Northwest (Overland Park, Kansas); Bishop Miege (Roeland Park, Kansas); Mater Dei (Santa Ana, California); Findlay Prep (Henderson, Nevada)
- College: Oregon (2018–2019)
- NBA draft: 2019: 2nd round, 44th overall pick
- Drafted by: Miami Heat
- Playing career: 2019–present

Career history
- 2019–2022: Denver Nuggets
- 2019–2020: →Windy City Bulls
- 2022–2023: Orlando Magic
- 2023–2025: Phoenix Suns
- 2026: TNT Tropang 5G

Career highlights
- McDonald's All-American (2018)
- Stats at NBA.com
- Stats at Basketball Reference

Bol Manute Bol (/ˈboʊl ˈboʊl/ BOHL BOHL; born November 16, 1999) is a South Sudanese–American professional basketball player who last played for the TNT Tropang 5G of the Philippine Basketball Association (PBA). He played college basketball for the Oregon Ducks. A son of basketball player Manute Bol, who was known for being one of the tallest players in NBA history, Bol was born in Khartoum, Sudan, but was raised in the Kansas City area from a young age. In high school, Bol was considered one of the best players in the class of 2018, having been rated a consensus five-star recruit and earning McDonald's All-American honors. A center listed at 7 feet 3 inches (2.21 m), he is one of the tallest players in NBA history.

Bol started his high school career at Blue Valley Northwest High School, where he was assigned to the junior varsity team. He transferred to Bishop Miege High School in the middle of the season but remained on junior varsity due to transfer rules. He joined varsity in his second year. As a junior, he moved to Mater Dei High School in Santa Ana, California, rising in profile as a recruit. In his final season, Bol played for Findlay Prep in Henderson, Nevada. At the international level, he represents the United States but has never competed for them in a FIBA tournament. He was drafted with the 44th pick in the 2019 NBA draft by the Miami Heat, but was traded to the Denver Nuggets on draft day. He has also played for the Orlando Magic and the Phoenix Suns.

== Early life ==
Bol was born on November 16, 1999, in Khartoum, Sudan, as the second child of former National Basketball Association (NBA) star Manute Bol and his wife Ajok Kuag. He was named after his late great-grandfather and Dinka chief Bol Chol Bol. In 1998, after an American missile strike during the Second Sudanese Civil War, Manute was accused of being an American spy and was barred by the Sudanese government from fleeing to the United States. In 2001, the family traveled to Cairo, Egypt, where they were stranded for many months due to visa problems, despite having acquired tickets to the United States from American friends.

In the following year, when Bol was two years old, his family moved to Connecticut as designated political refugees. Upon encouragement from his father, he began playing basketball at age four, although he was initially reluctant. Bol eventually began training with his father in the gym. At age seven, his family moved to Kansas City and settled in Olathe, Kansas, a city with a large South Sudanese population. As a 6-foot-5-inch (1.96 m) seventh grader, Bol featured in a highlight video at an Indianapolis basketball camp that drew attention from CBS Sports and The Washington Post. His first NCAA Division I offer came from New Mexico State when he was still in the eighth grade.

== High school ==
For the beginning of his freshman basketball season, Bol played for the junior varsity team of Blue Valley Northwest High School in Overland Park, Kansas. Because he did not live in his school district, Bol transferred to Bishop Miege High School in Roeland Park, Kansas where he continued his freshman season. At age 14, he stood 6 ft 10 in (2.08 m), but he was forced to remain at the junior varsity level until February 2015 because of transfer rules. Bol made his debut for the Bishop Miege junior varsity team on December 11, 2014, displaying his shot blocking and shooting ability. Despite becoming eligible on the varsity team by the end of the season, he did not earn playing time. On March 4, 2015, sports website Bleacher Report compared him to a taller Kevin Durant. In May, Bol played for his under-15 Amateur Athletic Union (AAU) team KC Run GMC at the Jayhawk Invitational in Kansas City, Missouri, scoring 15 points in one game. By then, he was receiving interest from a number of NCAA Division I programs, including Kansas and Oklahoma.

In his sophomore season, Bol was ranked as one of the top players in the class of 2018 by recruiting service 247Sports. On January 6, 2016, in his fourth varsity game, he posted 16 points in a 59–57 upset loss to Hogan Preparatory Academy. Bol contributed 14 points to help Bishop Miege win the Kansas Class 4A Division I state title game, 69–59, over McPherson High School in March. After leading his team to a 22-win season, he earned class 4A-I first-team honors. In April 2016, he received a scholarship offer from Kansas.

In November 2016, Bol announced that he was transferring from Bishop Miege to Mater Dei High School in Santa Ana, California for his junior year. He was encouraged to join the program because of its head coach Gary McKnight. Bol debuted for Mater Dei on January 24, 2017, recording 21 points, 10 rebounds, and 3 blocks to coast past Orange Lutheran High School. On February 24, he recorded 14 points, 14 rebounds, and 5 blocks in an overtime win over defending national champions Chino Hills High School. He scored 15 points in a March 4 loss to Bishop Montgomery High School at the CIF Southern Section Open Division title game. On March 14, at the Open Division semifinals, Bol led Mater Dei with 15 points and 6 rebounds as they defeated St. Augustine High School. He averaged 16.5 points, 8.6 rebounds, and 2.9 blocks per game as a junior, leading his team to a California Interscholastic Federation (CIF) runner-up finish. During the season he received offers from Arizona, USC, and Oregon, as well as offers from Kentucky and UCLA. In May, at the Nike Elite Youth Basketball League (EYBL) with his team California Supreme, Bol averaged 25.4 points, 9.9 rebounds and 4.1 blocks per game.

Bol transferred to Findlay Prep in Henderson, Nevada in November 2017, where he would play under head coach Paul Washington. His head coach at Mater Dei said that Bol made the move due to "family reasons." Shortly after, he committed to play college basketball for Oregon, choosing them over Kentucky. Before the season, Bol was included among 20 players in the USA Today preseason boys' basketball team. On November 27, 2017, he recorded 30 points, 8 rebounds, and 4 blocks in a 66–61 win over Morgan Park High School at the Like Mike Invitational. Bol scored 32 points in 21 minutes, shooting 14-of-17 from the field, in a January 14, 2018, rout of Immaculate Conception High School at the Spalding Hoophall Classic. He was selected for the 2018 McDonald's All-American Boys Game, but was unable to play due to injury. Bol finished his senior season at Findlay Prep averaging 20.4 points, 8.2 rebounds, and 2.4 blocks per game, earning All-USA Boys Basketball Second-Team honors from USA Today High School Sports.

=== Recruiting ===
College recruiting
| Name | Hometown | School | Height | Weight | Commit date |
|---|---|---|---|---|---|
| Bol Bol; C | Olathe, KS | Findlay Prep (NV) | 7 ft 2 in (2.18 m) | 225 lb (102 kg) | Nov 20, 2017 |
| Bol Bol; C | Recruit ratings: Rivals: 247Sports: ESPN: (96) | | | | |
Overall recruit ranking: Rivals: 4 247Sports: 4 ESPN: 4
Note: In many cases, Scout, Rivals, 247Sports, On3, and ESPN may conflict in their listings of height and weight.; In these cases, the average was taken. ESPN grades are on a 100-point scale.; Sources: "Oregon 2018 Basketball Commitments". Rivals.; "2018 Oregon Ducks Recruiting Class". ESPN.; "2018 Team Ranking". Rivals.

== College career ==
Bol joined Oregon as a freshman in the 2018–19 season under head coach Dana Altman. Entering the season, he was considered one of the best prospects for the upcoming NBA draft, although analysts described him as a polarizing prospect in the long term. On November 6, 2018, Bol debuted with a double-double of 12 points, 12 rebounds, and 3 blocks in 23 minutes against Portland State. He later recorded a season-high 32 points and 11 rebounds in an 89–84 loss to Texas Southern. After recording 20 points, 9 rebounds, and 4 blocks in a 66–54 win over San Diego on December 12, Bol injured his left foot and missed the rest of the season. He declared for the NBA draft after his freshman season. Bol was projected as the third pick in the 2019 NBA draft behind Zion Williamson and RJ Barrett before his season-ending injury.

== Professional career ==
=== Denver Nuggets (2019–2022) ===
Bol was drafted with the 44th pick of the 2019 NBA draft by the Miami Heat. He was originally mentioned as a potential lottery pick or being selected somewhere in the first round on draft night, but slid in the draft until the second round. His draft rights were then traded to the Denver Nuggets for a 2022 second-round draft pick acquired from the Philadelphia 76ers. On September 6, 2019, Bol signed a two-way contract with the Nuggets, splitting time with the Windy City Bulls. He had his first double double in the NBA G League on November 20, recording 16 points, 11 rebounds and two blocks in a 115–105 win over the Fort Wayne Mad Ants. On November 24, the Nuggets recalled Bol.

Bol eventually made his NBA debut in the 2020 NBA Bubble on August 1, 2020, recording 5 points and 4 rebounds in under 11 minutes of play in a 105–125 loss to the Miami Heat. The Nuggets finished as the third seed in the Western Conference, and faced the Utah Jazz during their first round matchup. Bol made his playoff debut on August 19, scoring two points in a 105–124 Game 2 loss. The Nuggets eliminated the Jazz in seven games, and advanced to face the Los Angeles Clippers in the second round, whom they defeated in another seven-game series. The Nuggets eventually fell to the Los Angeles Lakers in the Western Conference Finals, losing in five games.

On January 1, 2022, Bol scored a season-high 11 points, alongside three rebounds, in a 124–111 win over the Houston Rockets. On January 10, Bol was traded to the Detroit Pistons in exchange for Rodney McGruder and a 2022 second-round draft pick via the Brooklyn Nets. The trade was voided on January 13, after Bol failed his physical fitness exam. On January 18, he underwent surgery on his right foot and was listed as out indefinitely.

=== Orlando Magic (2022–2023) ===
On January 19, 2022, Bol and PJ Dozier were traded to the Boston Celtics in a three-team transaction involving the San Antonio Spurs, which sent Juancho Hernangómez to San Antonio and Bryn Forbes to Denver. On February 10, before playing in a game for the Celtics, Bol and Dozier were traded to the Orlando Magic, alongside a future second-round draft pick and cash considerations, for a 2023 protected second-round pick. On March 15, he was ruled out for the remainder of the season.

On July 7, 2022, Bol re-signed with the Magic. On November 16, Bol recorded a career-high 26 points, alongside 12 rebounds, and three blocks in a 108–126 loss to the Minnesota Timberwolves.

On July 4, 2023, Bol was waived by the Magic.

=== Phoenix Suns (2023–2025) ===
On July 18, 2023, the Phoenix Suns signed Bol to a one-year deal. On January 1, 2024, Bol recorded his best game of the season at the time with season-highs of 11 points and a team-high 9 rebounds in 20 minutes of action in a 109–88 win over the Portland Trail Blazers after previously only playing 19 total minutes throughout 8 games played with Phoenix. On February 23, 2024, Bol put up his best game of the season with the Suns with season-high performances of 25 points and 14 rebounds while coming off the bench in a 114–110 loss to the Houston Rockets. On July 7, 2024, he re-signed with the Suns.

=== TNT Tropang 5G (2026) ===
In February 2026, Bol signed with the TNT Tropang 5G of the Philippine Basketball Association (PBA) as the team's import for the 2026 Commissioners Cup. He made his debut for the TNT Tropang 5G in their 112–109 loss to the Rain or Shine Elasto Painters in March 2026. Bol developed a reputation for not giving post-game interviews in the PBA, with TNT coach Chot Reyes attributing it to Bol's personality and unfamiliarity in playing in a non-U.S. league.

Bol recorded a career high with TNT in a 108–101 loss to the Magnolia Hotshots on May 5, 2026, with 53 points, seven blocks and 20 rebounds. TNT finished as the eight placed team in the elimination round advancing to the quarterfinals.

The team underperformed with TNT coming close to a grand slam, only failing to win the 2025 Philippine Cup, the third and final tournament of the 2024–25 season. This led to the players to holding an open forum among players to determine the issue internally. Bol was told to pass the ball to his teammates more.

In the playoffs, TNT reached the quarterfinals and beat the top-seeded NLEX Road Warriors, who had a twice-to-beat advantage. TNT became the fifth No. 8 seed to advance to the tournament. However, Bol suffered a torn Achilles tendon in semifinals Game 2 against the Meralco Bolts, causing him to miss the rest of the tournament. Reyes said that, contrary to perceptions, Bol was coachable and had a good relationship with teammates during Bol's stint.

== National team career ==
After taking part in training camp, Bol was a finalist to make the United States roster for the 2017 FIBA Under-19 Basketball World Cup. However, he was later cut from the squad by head coach John Calipari.

In April 2018, Bol drew attention at the Nike Hoop Summit, playing for the United States junior national select team. He recorded 20 points, 9 rebounds, 6 assists, and 5 steals in an 89–76 loss to Team World, which was made up of international players playing high school basketball in the United States.

In June 2024, Bol was among the fifty pre-selected players for the South Sudan national team, who were playing in the 2024 Summer Olympics at the time. On July 19, 2024, it was announced Bol had been ruled out for the Olympics for undisclosed personal reasons.

== Personal life ==
Bol is the son of former NBA player Manute Bol, who was even taller and stood at a towering 7 feet, 7 inches. Bol has ten siblings, including Madut, who played college basketball at Southern University and graduated in 2013.

== Career statistics ==
Legend
| GP | Games played | GS | Games started | MPG | Minutes per game |
| FG% | Field goal percentage | 3P% | 3-point field goal percentage | FT% | Free throw percentage |
| RPG | Rebounds per game | APG | Assists per game | SPG | Steals per game |
| BPG | Blocks per game | PPG | Points per game | **Bold** | Career high |

=== NBA ===
==== Regular season ====
| Year | Team | GP | GS | MPG | FG% | 3P% | FT% | RPG | APG | SPG | BPG | PPG |
|---|---|---|---|---|---|---|---|---|---|---|---|---|
| 2019–20 | Denver | 7 | 0 | 12.4 | .500 | **.444** | **.800** | 2.7 | .9 | .3 | .9 | 5.7 |
| 2020–21 | Denver | 32 | 2 | 5.0 | .431 | .375 | .667 | .8 | .2 | .1 | .3 | 2.2 |
| 2021–22 | Denver | 14 | 0 | 5.8 | .556 | .250 | .400 | 1.4 | .4 | .1 | .1 | 2.4 |
| 2022–23 | Orlando | **70** | **33** | **21.5** | .546 | .265 | .759 | **5.8** | **1.0** | **.4** | **1.2** | **9.1** |
| 2023–24 | Phoenix | 43 | 0 | 10.9 | **.616** | .423 | .789 | 3.2 | .4 | .2 | .6 | 5.2 |
| 2024–25 | Phoenix | 36 | 10 | 12.4 | .525 | .344 | .769 | 2.9 | .6 | .3 | .7 | 6.8 |
| Career | | 202 | 45 | 13.6 | .545 | .332 | .749 | 3.5 | .6 | .3 | .8 | 6.2 |

==== Playoffs ====
| Year | Team | GP | GS | MPG | FG% | 3P% | FT% | RPG | APG | SPG | BPG | PPG |
|---|---|---|---|---|---|---|---|---|---|---|---|---|
| 2020 | Denver | **4** | 0 | **5.4** | **.556** | **.667** | .875 | **1.3** | .0 | **.5** | **.5** | **4.8** |
| 2021 | Denver | 3 | 0 | 2.0 | .000 | .000 | — | .3 | **.7** | .0 | .0 | .0 |
| 2024 | Phoenix | 3 | 0 | 4.3 | .333 | — | — | **1.3** | .0 | .3 | .0 | .7 |
| Career | | 10 | 0 | 4.0 | .462 | .500 | .875 | 1.0 | .2 | .3 | .2 | 2.1 |

=== NBA G League ===
==== Regular season ====
| Year | Team | GP | GS | MPG | FG% | 3P% | FT% | RPG | APG | SPG | BPG | PPG |
|---|---|---|---|---|---|---|---|---|---|---|---|---|
| 2019–20 | Windy City | 8 | 0 | 19.3 | .577 | .364 | 1.000 | 5.8 | .0 | .1 | 2.3 | 12.0 |

=== College ===
| Year | Team | GP | GS | MPG | FG% | 3P% | FT% | RPG | APG | SPG | BPG | PPG |
|---|---|---|---|---|---|---|---|---|---|---|---|---|
| 2018–19 | Oregon | 9 | 9 | 29.8 | .561 | .520 | .757 | 9.6 | 1.0 | .8 | 2.7 | 21.0 |

== See also ==
- List of tallest players in NBA history
- List of second-generation NBA players
