= Josh Okogie =

Nigerian basketball player (born 1998)

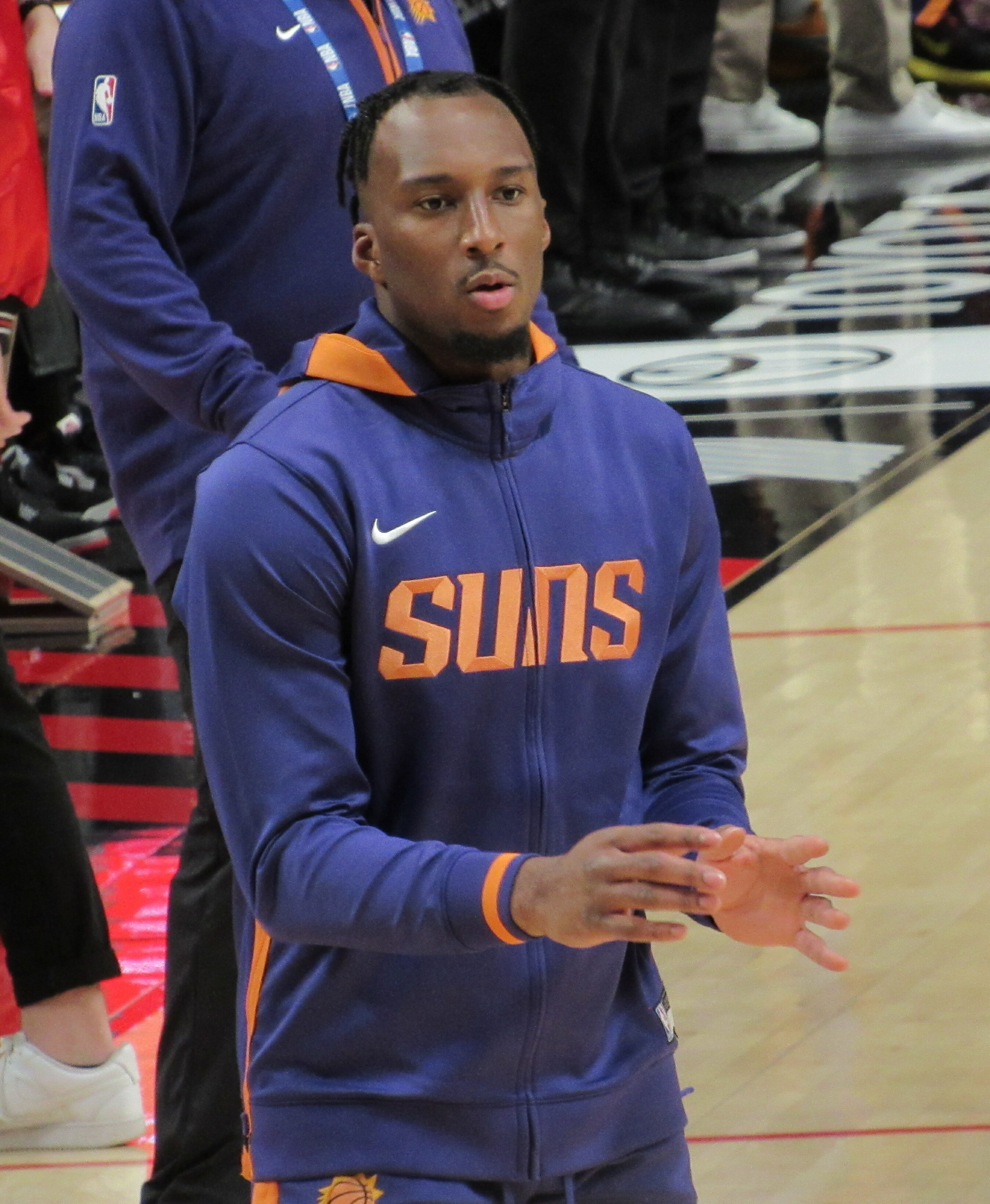
- Okogie with the Phoenix Suns in 2022

No. 21 – Utah Jazz
- Position: Shooting guard
- League: NBA

Personal information
- Born: 1 September 1998 (age 28) Lagos, Nigeria
- Listed height: 6 ft 4 in (1.93 m)
- Listed weight: 213 lb (97 kg)

Career information
- High school: Shiloh (Snellville, Georgia)
- College: Georgia Tech (2016–2018)
- NBA draft: 2018: 1st round, 20th overall pick
- Drafted by: Minnesota Timberwolves
- Playing career: 2018–present

Career history
- 2018–2022: Minnesota Timberwolves
- 2022–2025: Phoenix Suns
- 2025: Charlotte Hornets
- 2025–2026: Houston Rockets
- 2026–present: Utah Jazz

Career highlights
- Third-team All-ACC (2018); ACC All-Freshman Team (2017)
- Stats at NBA.com
- Stats at Basketball Reference

Joshua Aloiye Okogie (/əˈkoʊɡi/ ə-KOH-ghee; born 1 September 1998) is a Nigerian-American professional basketball player for the Utah Jazz of the National Basketball Association (NBA). He played college basketball for the Georgia Tech Yellow Jackets, and was selected 20th overall in the 2018 NBA draft by the Minnesota Timberwolves, where he spent his first four seasons before signing with the Phoenix Suns in 2022. He also represents the Nigeria national team.

== Early life ==
Okogie immigrated with his family to the United States when he was three years old. The family settled in Snellville, Georgia, where Okogie started playing basketball for Shiloh High School.

== College career ==
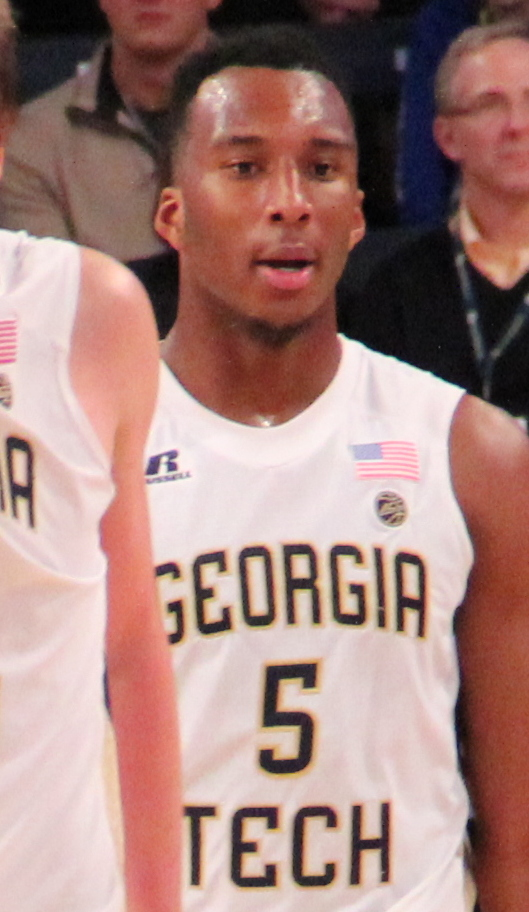
Okogie in 2016

As a 6 ft 4 in (1.93 m) shooting guard, he was not ranked by ESPN in the recruiting class of 2016. He signed with Georgia Tech and as a freshman, Okogie averaged 16.1 points 5.4 rebounds per game and was named to the ACC All-Freshman Team. He was a third team 2017–18 All-ACC selection as a sophomore. As a sophomore, Okogie led Georgia Tech in scoring with 18.2 points per game. After the season he declared for the 2018 NBA draft but did not hire an agent, thus leaving open the possibility of returning to school. However, he confirmed his intentions on entering the NBA draft on 21 May.

== Professional career ==
=== Minnesota Timberwolves (2018–2022) ===
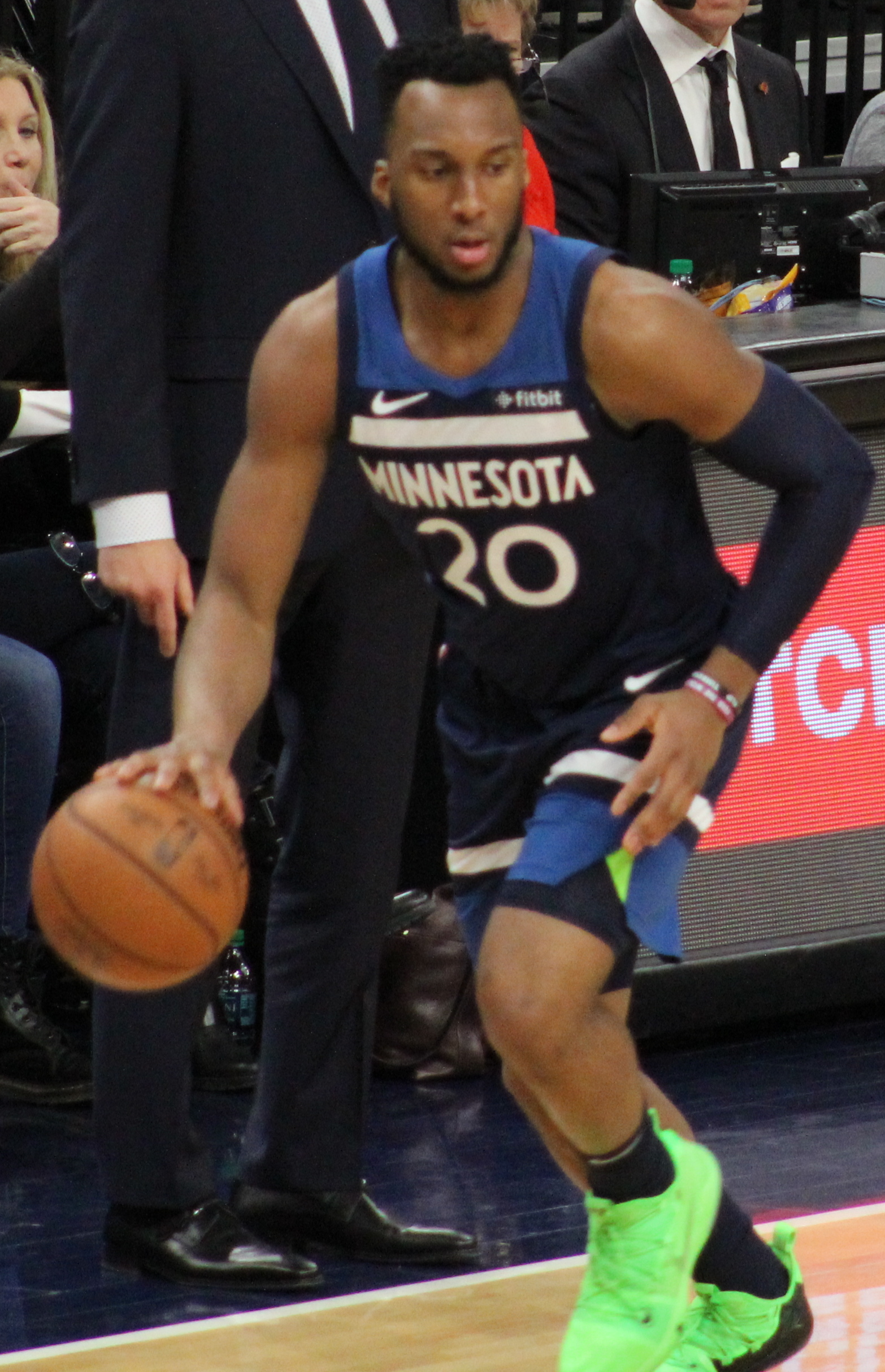
Okogie with the Minnesota Timberwolves in 2018

On 21 June 2018, the Minnesota Timberwolves drafted Okogie with the 20th overall pick in the 2018 NBA draft. On July 2, he signed with the Timberwolves. He participated in the 2018 NBA Summer League. After Jimmy Butler was traded from Minnesota in early November, Okogie entered the starting lineup, averaging nearly 22 minutes per game on the season. After the season, he participated in the 2019 NBA Summer League. On 29 January 2019, he was named a member of the World Team for the 2019 Rising Stars Challenge.

=== Phoenix Suns (2022–2025) ===
On 2 July 2022, Okogie signed a minimum deal with the Phoenix Suns. On 7 December Okogie scored a career-high 28 points in a 125–98 loss to the Boston Celtics. On 11 July 2023, Okogie re-signed with the Suns on a two-year, $5.8 million deal, with the second year being a player option. On 13 July 2024, Okogie re-signed with the Suns on a two-year, $16 million contract.

=== Charlotte Hornets (2025) ===
On 15 January 2025, Okogie and three future second-round picks were traded to the Charlotte Hornets in exchange for Nick Richards and one future second-round draft pick. Okogie made his debut five days later on January 20, finishing second on the team in plus/minus behind only Cody Martin in Charlotte's 110–105 win over the Dallas Mavericks. On January 24, during his third game with the Hornets, Okogie recorded a double-double with season highs of 16 points and 10 rebounds in a 102–97 loss to the Portland Trail Blazers. On 15 July 2025, Okogie was waived by the Hornets.

=== Houston Rockets (2025–2026) ===
On 22 July 2025, Okogie signed a one-year, minimum contract with the Houston Rockets. In the 2025–26 season, Okogie played a career-high 78 regular-season games for the Rockets (32 starts), averaging 4.5 points, 2.6 rebounds, 0.9 assists and 0.8 steals in 17.4 minutes per game. He shot 42.5% from the field and a career-best 38.5% from three-point range (on 2.1 attempts per game), well above his prior career mark of 31.2%. He appeared in six playoff games during Houston's first-round series against the Los Angeles Lakers, averaging 4.8 points, 2.3 rebounds and 1.2 steals in 17.3 minutes while maintaining the same 38.5% three-point accuracy.

=== Utah Jazz (2026–present) ===
On 9 July 2026, Okogie signed a two-year, $12 million contract with the Utah Jazz, with the second year being a team option.

== National team career ==
Okogie plays for the Nigerian national basketball team and participated in the 2019 FIBA Basketball World Cup. He also is currently playing for Nigeria at FIBA AfroBasket 2025.

== Career statistics ==
Legend
GP	Games played	GS	Games started	MPG	Minutes per game
FG%	Field goal percentage	3P%	3-point field goal percentage	FT%	Free throw percentage
RPG	Rebounds per game	APG	Assists per game	SPG	Steals per game
BPG	Blocks per game	PPG	Points per game	**Bold**	Career high

=== NBA ===
==== Regular season ====
Year	Team	GP	GS	MPG	FG%	3P%	FT%	RPG	APG	SPG	BPG	PPG
2018–19	Minnesota	74	**52**	23.7	.386	.279	.728	2.9	1.2	1.2	.4	7.7
2019–20	Minnesota	62	28	**25.0**	.427	.266	**.796**	**4.3**	**1.6**	1.1	.4	8.6
2020–21	Minnesota	59	37	20.3	.402	.269	.769	2.6	1.1	.9	**.5**	5.4
2021–22	Minnesota	49	6	10.5	.404	.298	.686	1.4	.5	.5	.2	2.7
2022–23	Phoenix	72	26	18.8	.391	.335	.724	3.5	1.5	.8	**.5**	7.3
2023–24	Phoenix	60	11	16.0	.417	.309	.745	2.6	1.1	.8	.4	4.6
2024–25	Phoenix	25	1	14.0	**491**	.381	.688	2.9	.6	.8	.4	6.0
2024–25	Charlotte	15	6	18.3	.388	.320	.774	2.7	1.3	**1.8**	**.5**	**8.9**
2025–26	Houston	**78**	32	17.4	.425	**.385**	.594	2.6	.9	.8	.2	4.5
Career		494	199	18.8	.409	.312	.736	2.9	1.1	.9	.4	6.1

==== Playoffs ====
Year	Team	GP	GS	MPG	FG%	3P%	FT%	RPG	APG	SPG	BPG	PPG
2022	Minnesota	1	0	2.2	—	—	—	.0	.0	.0	.0	.0
2023	Phoenix	**10**	**5**	**17.5**	.378	.143	.846	2.1	**1.3**	.6	**.2**	4.1
2024	Phoenix	4	0	7.3	**.556**	.333	.500	1.0	.5	.5	.0	3.5
2026	Houston	6	2	17.3	.440	**.385**	**1.000**	**2.3**	.8	**1.2**	.0	**4.8**
Career		21	7	14.8	.423	.267	.762	1.9	1.0	.7	.1	4.0

=== College ===
Year	Team	GP	GS	MPG	FG%	3P%	FT%	RPG	APG	SPG	BPG	PPG
2016–17	Georgia Tech	**37**	**37**	30.8	**.453**	**.384**	.747	5.4	1.6	1.3	.7	16.1
2017–18	Georgia Tech	24	24	**36.4**	.416	.380	**.821**	**6.3**	**2.5**	**1.8**	**1.0**	**18.2**
Career		61	61	33.0	.437	.382	.777	5.8	2.0	1.5	.8	16.9
