= 2023–24 Phoenix Suns season =

Professional basketball season

- Head coach: Frank Vogel
- General manager: James Jones
- Owners: Mat Ishbia & Justin Ishbia
- Arena: Footprint Center

Results
- Record: 49–33 (.598)
- Place: Division: 2nd (Pacific); Conference: 6th (Western)
- Playoff finish: First round (lost to Timberwolves 0–4)
- Stats at Basketball Reference

Local media
- Television: Arizona's Family Sports (Note: KTVK, KPHO-TV, KOLD-TV, KPHE-LD, KAZF, KAZS); FuboTV (Note: Albuquerque, New Mexico); Kiswe (Suns Live)
- Radio: KTAR

The 2023–24 Phoenix Suns season was the 56th season of the franchise in the National Basketball Association (NBA), as well as their 31st season at the Footprint Center. It is also the first full season under the ownership group led by Mat Ishbia and Justin Ishbia after the brothers purchased the team on February 8, 2023. It was the first season since 1971–72 without Al McCoy broadcasting any games. He announced his retirement after the 2023 NBA playoffs. It also was the first season the Suns moved their broadcasting services from Bally Sports Arizona (previously named FSN Arizona and Fox Sports Arizona) back in 2003 to local broadcast stations in Arizona owned by Gray Television, branded as Arizona's Family Sports (with it also being included to Albuquerue, New Mexico viewers via FuboTV), alongside an over-the-top subscription service called "Suns Live" that was created by Kiswe. During their first season under this change, the Suns would see a 69% increase in viewership by comparison to the previous season under Bally Sports Arizona. This was the first season since 2018–19 without head coach Monty Williams after a second straight disappointing second-round exit. He was fired on May 13, 2023, despite having the team's first winning record as head coach since Jeff Hornacek, the first overall winning record and first coach to make the playoffs since Alvin Gentry, their first NBA Coach of the Year Award winner since Mike D'Antoni, and their first head coach since Paul Westphal (and third overall alongside John MacLeod) to reach the NBA Finals, with one season left on his original deal.

On June 6, the Suns hired Frank Vogel (a championship-winning head coach in the 2020 NBA Finals with the Los Angeles Lakers) over finalists Doc Rivers (who won the NBA Finals in 2008 with the Boston Celtics) and associate coach Kevin Young (who kept his job with a pay raise in mind), with his new coaching staff made official on June 21. On June 24, the Suns traded with the Washington Wizards to acquire 3-time All-Star shooting guard Bradley Beal (alongside Jordan Goodwin and Isaiah Todd) in exchange for 12-time All-Star point guard Chris Paul, shooting guard Landry Shamet, six second-rounders, four first-round pick swaps (with at least one of them not conveying properly), and cash, though the deal was later considered a part of a three-way deal with the Indiana Pacers. This became the team's second trade for a star player in four months after trading for 13-time NBA All-Star and 2-time NBA Finals MVP Kevin Durant during the previous season in February. During the month of July, the Suns made three more trades to gain more immediate draft capital on their end. On September 27, before training camp, the Suns traded center Deandre Ayton and rookie Toumani Camara to the Portland Trail Blazers in a three-way deal that sent 7-time All-Star Trail Blazers guard Damian Lillard to the Milwaukee Bucks in exchange for Milwaukee shooting guard Grayson Allen, Portland center Jusuf Nurkić, and Portland guards Nassir Little and Keon Johnson (the last of whom was waived before the start of the regular season). The Suns then made a three-team trade at the February 8, 2024 trade deadline with the Brooklyn Nets and Memphis Grizzlies to acquire Nets forward Royce O'Neale and Grizzlies forward David Roddy alongside a 2026 first-round pick swap with Memphis in exchange for mostly free agent acquisitions from earlier in the season in Keita Bates-Diop, Jordan Goodwin, Yuta Watanabe, Chimezie Metu, and three of the Suns' four remaining second-round picks they had at the time, and also signed veteran free agents Thaddeus Young and Isaiah Thomas (the latter of whom had played with the Suns during the 2014–15 season) in a final attempt to bolster up their roster for the season.

Throughout this season, the Suns dealt with constant challenges that had them performing below expectations early on, such as the delayed debut of their Big Three of Devin Booker, Kevin Durant, and Bradley Beal together until December 13, 2023 (with them not even seeing consistent playing time together until the end of 2023 and the start of 2024) alongside injuries and poor fourth quarter production by comparison to the rest of their quarters of play that would cost them some games, especially earlier in the season. Despite these consistent issues, including starting the season out with a 4–6 record and ending 2023 at 17–15, the Suns would still manage to obtain their fourth straight winning season in a row following a 131–106 blowout win over the San Antonio Spurs on March 23, 2024. They would then match last season's win total with a 122–101 blowout win over the Cleveland Cavaliers at home on April 3 and surpass it two days later with a 97–87 win over the then #1 Western Conference team, the Minnesota Timberwolves. After a dramatic April that went down to the wire at times, the Suns secured the sixth playoff spot in the Western Conference, avoiding the play-in tournament altogether due to a combination of a 125–106 blowout win over the Timberwolves and a 124–108 Los Angeles Lakers win over the New Orleans Pelicans, with the Suns holding the series victory over the Pelicans 2–1 this season. Despite sweeping Minnesota in the regular season, the Suns were swept in the first round by the Timberwolves (who fell to the #3 seed in part by the Suns' hands at the end of the regular season) in four games, losing each game by an average margin of 15 points. This not only was the first time since 2008 that the Suns were exited out of the first round, but it was also the first time they were swept in a playoff series in general since 1999. It also was Vogel's only season in his original five-year, $31 million deal that he served with the team, as he was eventually fired from his position on May 9, 2024, following their disappointing playoff appearance. The Phoenix Suns drew an average home attendance of 17,071 in 41 home games in the 2023-24 NBA season.

== Draft ==
Round	Pick	Player	Position(s)	Nationality	College / Club
2	52	Toumani Camara	Power Forward	Belgium	Dayton

The Suns entered this draft with only a second-round pick after trading their first-round pick to acquire Kevin Durant during the previous season. With the 52nd pick, the Suns selected Belgian power forward Toumani Camara, who originally played for the University of Georgia before transferring to the University of Dayton after his sophomore season ended. During his time in Dayton, Camara was a part of the All-Atlantic 10 Third Team in his junior year before entering both the All-Atlantic 10 First Team and the Atlantic 10 All-Defensive Team in his senior year. Camara signed a four-year, partially-guaranteed rookie-scaled deal on July 3, with years after his first season being guaranteed later on via his production with the team. On September 27, Camara was traded alongside Deandre Ayton to the Portland Trail Blazers in a three-way deal that also saw Trail Blazers guard Damian Lillard being sent to the Milwaukee Bucks.

== Roster ==
2023–24 Phoenix Suns roster
Players

Pos.	No.	Player	Height	Weight	DOB	From
G	8	Grayson Allen	6 ft 4 in (1.93 m)	198 lb (90 kg)	1995-10-08	Duke
F/C	27	Udoka Azubuike (TW)	6 ft 11 in (2.11 m)	270 lb (122 kg)	1999-09-17	Kansas
G	3	Bradley Beal	6 ft 4 in (1.93 m)	207 lb (94 kg)	1993-06-28	Florida
F/C	11	Bol Bol	7 ft 3 in (2.21 m)	220 lb (100 kg)	1999-11-16	Oregon
G	1	Devin Booker	6 ft 6 in (1.98 m)	206 lb (93 kg)	1996-10-30	Kentucky
F	35	Kevin Durant	6 ft 11 in (2.11 m)	240 lb (109 kg)	1988-09-29	Texas
F/C	14	Drew Eubanks	6 ft 10 in (2.08 m)	245 lb (111 kg)	1997-02-01	Oregon State
G	23	Eric Gordon	6 ft 3 in (1.91 m)	215 lb (98 kg)	1988-12-25	Indiana
G/F	10	Damion Lee	6 ft 6 in (1.98 m)	210 lb (95 kg)	1992-10-21	Louisville
G	38	Saben Lee (TW)	6 ft 2 in (1.88 m)	183 lb (83 kg)	1999-06-23	Vanderbilt
G/F	25	Nassir Little	6 ft 6 in (1.98 m)	220 lb (100 kg)	2000-02-11	North Carolina
C	20	Jusuf Nurkić	7 ft 0 in (2.13 m)	290 lb (132 kg)	1994-08-23	Bosnia and Herzegovina
G	2	Josh Okogie	6 ft 4 in (1.93 m)	213 lb (97 kg)	1998-09-01	Georgia Tech
F	00	Royce O'Neale	6 ft 6 in (1.98 m)	226 lb (103 kg)	1993-06-05	Baylor
F	21	David Roddy	6 ft 4 in (1.93 m)	255 lb (116 kg)	2001-03-27	Colorado State
G	4	Isaiah Thomas	5 ft 9 in (1.75 m)	185 lb (84 kg)	1989-02-07	Washington
F	12	Ish Wainright (TW)	6 ft 5 in (1.96 m)	250 lb (113 kg)	1994-09-12	Baylor
F	30	Thaddeus Young	6 ft 8 in (2.03 m)	225 lb (102 kg)	1988-06-21	Georgia Tech

Coaches
Head coach
- Frank Vogel
Assistant(s)
- Dru Anthrop
- Quinton Crawford
- David Fizdale
- John Lucas III
- Jon Pastorek
- Miles Simon
- Greg St. Jean

Legend
- (DP) Unsigned draft pick
- (FA) Free agent
- (S) Suspended
- (GL) On assignment to G League affiliate
- (TW) Two-way affiliate player
- Injured

Roster
Updated: April 9, 2024

== Standings ==
=== Division ===
Pacific Division	W	L	PCT	GB	Home	Road	Div	GP
y – Los Angeles Clippers	51	31	.622	–	25‍–‍16	26‍–‍15	9‍–‍7	82
x – Phoenix Suns	49	33	.598	2.0	25‍–‍16	24‍–‍17	9‍–‍9	82
x – Los Angeles Lakers	47	35	.573	4.0	28‍–‍14	19‍–‍21	7‍–‍10	82
pi – Sacramento Kings	46	36	.561	5.0	24‍–‍17	22‍–‍19	10‍–‍7	82
pi – Golden State Warriors	46	36	.561	5.0	21‍–‍20	25‍–‍16	7‍–‍9	82

=== Conference ===
Western Conference
#	Team	W	L	PCT	GB	GP
1	c – Oklahoma City Thunder *	57	25	.695	–	82
2	x – Denver Nuggets	57	25	.695	–	82
3	x – Minnesota Timberwolves	56	26	.683	1.0	82
4	y – Los Angeles Clippers *	51	31	.622	6.0	82
5	y – Dallas Mavericks *	50	32	.610	7.0	82
6	x – Phoenix Suns	49	33	.598	8.0	82
7	x – New Orleans Pelicans	49	33	.598	8.0	82
8	x – Los Angeles Lakers	47	35	.573	10.0	82
9	pi – Sacramento Kings	46	36	.561	11.0	82
10	pi – Golden State Warriors	46	36	.561	11.0	82
11	Houston Rockets	41	41	.500	16.0	82
12	Utah Jazz	31	51	.378	26.0	82
13	Memphis Grizzlies	27	55	.329	30.0	82
14	San Antonio Spurs	22	60	.268	35.0	82
15	Portland Trail Blazers	21	61	.256	36.0	82

== Game log ==
=== Preseason ===
2023 preseason game log
Total: 4–1 (Home: 1–1; Road: 3–0)
Preseason: 4–1 (home: 1–1; road: 3–0)

Game	Date	Team	Score	High points	High rebounds	High assists	Location Attendance	Record
1	October 8	@ Detroit	W 130–126 (OT)	Grayson Allen (18)	Drew Eubanks (8)	Saben Lee (4)	Little Caesars Arena; 15,062	1–0
2	October 10	Denver	L 107–115	Josh Okogie (17)	Josh Okogie (6)	Saben Lee (9)	Footprint Center; 17,071	1–1
3	October 12	@ Portland	W 122–111	Eric Gordon (20)	Udoka Azubuike (9)	Kevin Durant (6)	Moda Center; 17,713	2–1
4	October 16	Portland	W 117–106	Booker, Durant (19)	Jordan Goodwin (8)	Booker, Durant (4)	Footprint Center; 17,071	3–1
5	October 19	@ L.A. Lakers	W 123–100	Kevin Durant (21)	Drew Eubanks (9)	Drew Eubanks (6)	Acrisure Arena; 10,203	4–1

2023–24 preseason schedule

=== Regular season ===
2023–24 game log
Total: 49–33 (Home: 25–16; Road: 24–17)
October: 2–2 (home: 1–1; road: 1–1)

Game	Date	Team	Score	High points	High rebounds	High assists	Location Attendance	Record
1	October 24	@ Golden State	W 108–104	Devin Booker (32)	Jusuf Nurkić (14)	Devin Booker (8)	Chase Center; 18,064	1–0
2	October 26	@ L.A. Lakers	L 95–100	Kevin Durant (39)	Kevin Durant (11)	Grayson Allen (4)	Crypto.com Arena; 18,997	1–1
3	October 28	Utah	W 126–104	Kevin Durant (26)	Jusuf Nurkić (7)	Kevin Durant (7)	Footprint Center; 17,071	2–1
4	October 31	San Antonio	L 114–115	Kevin Durant (26)	Jusuf Nurkić (12)	Kevin Durant (7)	Footprint Center; 17,071	2–2

November: 9–5 (home: 3–3; road: 6–2)

Game	Date	Team	Score	High points	High rebounds	High assists	Location Attendance	Record
5	November 2	San Antonio	L 121–132	Devin Booker (31)	Devin Booker (9)	Devin Booker (13)	Footprint Center; 17,071	2–3
6	November 4	@ Philadelphia	L 100–112	Kevin Durant (31)	Jusuf Nurkić (9)	Jusuf Nurkić (5)	Wells Fargo Center; 19,796	2–4
7	November 5	@ Detroit	W 120–106	Kevin Durant (41)	Goodwin, Okogie (7)	Eric Gordon (8)	Little Caesars Arena; 20,062	3–4
8	November 8	@ Chicago	W 116–115 (OT)	Grayson Allen (26)	Jusuf Nurkić (17)	Kevin Durant (9)	United Center; 18,220	4–4
9	November 10	L.A. Lakers	L 119–122	Kevin Durant (38)	Allen, Durant, Nurkić (9)	Jusuf Nurkić (7)	Footprint Center; 17,071	4–5
10	November 12	Oklahoma City	L 99–111	Kevin Durant (28)	Kevin Durant (9)	Bradley Beal (5)	Footprint Center; 17,071	4–6
11	November 15	Minnesota	W 133–115	Booker, Durant (31)	Kevin Durant (6)	Kevin Durant (6)	Footprint Center; 17,071	5–6
12	November 17	@ Utah	W 131–128	Kevin Durant (38)	Kevin Durant (9)	Devin Booker (15)	Delta Center; 18,206	6–6
13	November 19	@ Utah	W 140–137 (2OT)	Kevin Durant (39)	Jusuf Nurkić (12)	Kevin Durant (10)	Delta Center; 18,206	7–6
14	November 21	Portland	W 120–107	Kevin Durant (31)	Jusuf Nurkić (12)	Kevin Durant (9)	Footprint Center; 17,071	8–6
15	November 22	Golden State	W 123–115	Kevin Durant (32)	Booker, Durant (8)	Devin Booker (10)	Footprint Center; 17,071	9–6
16	November 24	@ Memphis	W 110–89	Devin Booker (40)	Jusuf Nurkić (10)	Jusuf Nurkić (6)	FedExForum; 17,794	10–6
17	November 26	@ New York	W 116–113	Devin Booker (28)	Jusuf Nurkić (10)	Devin Booker (11)	Madison Square Garden; 19,812	11–6
18	November 29	@ Toronto	L 105–112	Kevin Durant (30)	Jusuf Nurkić (14)	Durant, Nurkić (6)	Scotiabank Arena; 19,800	11–7

December: 6–8 (home: 5–5; road: 1–3)

Game	Date	Team	Score	High points	High rebounds	High assists	Location Attendance	Record
19	December 1	Denver	L 111–119	Jusuf Nurkić (31)	Grayson Allen (9)	Kevin Durant (11)	Footprint Center; 17,071	11–8
20	December 2	Memphis	W 116–109	Devin Booker (34)	Devin Booker (10)	Devin Booker (7)	Footprint Center; 17,071	12–8
21	December 5	@ L.A. Lakers	L 103–106	Kevin Durant (31)	Devin Booker (11)	Devin Booker (6)	Crypto.com Arena; 18,664	12–9
22	December 8	Sacramento	L 106–114	Devin Booker (28)	Jusuf Nurkić (9)	Devin Booker (7)	Footprint Center; 17,071	12–10
23	December 12	Golden State	W 119–116	Devin Booker (32)	Jusuf Nurkić (13)	Booker, Nurkić (7)	Footprint Center; 17,071	13–10
24	December 13	Brooklyn	L 112–116	Devin Booker (34)	Jusuf Nurkić (22)	Devin Booker (12)	Footprint Center; 17,071	13–11
25	December 15	New York	L 122–139	Kevin Durant (29)	Jusuf Nurkić (12)	Booker, Goodwin (9)	Footprint Center; 17,071	13–12
26	December 17	Washington	W 112–108	Kevin Durant (28)	Jusuf Nurkić (17)	Devin Booker (8)	Footprint Center; 17,071	14–12
27	December 19	@ Portland	L 104–109	Kevin Durant (40)	Jusuf Nurkić (13)	Devin Booker (7)	Moda Center; 18,233	14–13
28	December 22	@ Sacramento	L 105–120	Kevin Durant (28)	Udoka Azubuike (11)	Devin Booker (7)	Golden 1 Center; 17,794	14–14
29	December 25	Dallas	L 114–128	Grayson Allen (32)	Chimezie Metu (19)	Devin Booker (10)	Footprint Center; 17,071	14–15
30	December 27	@ Houston	W 129–113	Durant, Gordon (27)	Durant, Nurkić (10)	Kevin Durant (16)	Toyota Center; 18,055	15–15
31	December 29	Charlotte	W 133–119	Devin Booker (35)	Jusuf Nurkić (15)	Kevin Durant (11)	Footprint Center; 17,071	16–15
32	December 31	Orlando	W 112–107	Kevin Durant (31)	Jusuf Nurkić (13)	Booker, Durant (5)	Footprint Center; 17,071	17–15

January : 11–5 (home: 5–2; road: 6–3)

Game	Date	Team	Score	High points	High rebounds	High assists	Location Attendance	Record
33	January 1	Portland	W 109–88	Bradley Beal (21)	Bol Bol (9)	Devin Booker (6)	Footprint Center; 17,071	18–15
34	January 3	L.A. Clippers	L 122–131	Devin Booker (35)	Jusuf Nurkić (6)	Devin Booker (6)	Footprint Center; 17,071	18–16
35	January 5	Miami	W 113–97	Grayson Allen (31)	Jusuf Nurkić (9)	Devin Booker (10)	Footprint Center; 17,071	19–16
36	January 7	Memphis	L 115–121	Devin Booker (24)	Jusuf Nurkić (19)	Devin Booker (8)	Footprint Center; 17,071	19–17
37	January 8	@ L.A. Clippers	L 111–138	Kevin Durant (30)	Kevin Durant (7)	Devin Booker (5)	Crypto.com Arena; 19,370	19–18
38	January 11	@ L.A. Lakers	W 127–109	Bradley Beal (37)	Jusuf Nurkić (12)	Booker, Durant (5)	Crypto.com Arena; 18,416	20–18
39	January 14	@ Portland	W 127–116	Devin Booker (34)	Jusuf Nurkić (13)	Devin Booker (7)	Moda Center; 18,071	21–18
40	January 16	Sacramento	W 119–117	Grayson Allen (29)	Jusuf Nurkić (15)	Devin Booker (11)	Footprint Center; 17,071	22–18
41	January 19	@ New Orleans	W 123–109	Devin Booker (52)	Jusuf Nurkić (15)	Jusuf Nurkić (9)	Smoothie King Center; 18,686	23–18
42	January 21	Indiana	W 117–110	Kevin Durant (40)	Jusuf Nurkić (13)	Devin Booker (8)	Footprint Center; 17,071	24–18
43	January 22	Chicago	W 115–113	Kevin Durant (43)	Drew Eubanks (8)	Kevin Durant (8)	Footprint Center; 17,071	25–18
44	January 24	@ Dallas	W 132–109	Devin Booker (46)	Kevin Durant (10)	Durant, Beal (7)	American Airlines Center; 20,202	26–18
45	January 26	@ Indiana	L 131–133	Devin Booker (62)	Kevin Durant (7)	Kevin Durant (6)	Gainbridge Fieldhouse; 17,274	26–19
46	January 28	@ Orlando	L 98–113	Devin Booker (44)	Drew Eubanks (8)	Bradley Beal (6)	Kia Center; 18,823	26–20
47	January 29	@ Miami	W 118–105	Eric Gordon (23)	Booker, Durant, Nurkić (8)	Beal, Booker, Durant (7)	Kaseya Center; 19,600	27–20
48	January 31	@ Brooklyn	W 136–120	Kevin Durant (33)	Jusuf Nurkić (11)	Booker, Durant (8)	Barclays Center; 17,732	28–20

February: 7–4 (home: 6–0; road: 1–4)

Game	Date	Team	Score	High points	High rebounds	High assists	Location Attendance	Record
49	February 2	@ Atlanta	L 120–129	Kevin Durant (35)	Jusuf Nurkić (9)	Bradley Beal (10)	State Farm Arena; 16,536	28–21
50	February 4	@ Washington	W 140–112	Bradley Beal (43)	Jusuf Nurkić (13)	Jusuf Nurkić (8)	Capital One Arena; 16,984	29–21
51	February 6	Milwaukee	W 114–106	Devin Booker (32)	Beal, Durant, Nurkić (10)	Booker, Nurkić (4)	Footprint Center; 17,071	30–21
52	February 8	Utah	W 129–115	Kevin Durant (31)	Durant, Nurkić (8)	Grayson Allen (14)	Footprint Center; 17,071	31–21
53	February 10	@ Golden State	L 112–113	Devin Booker (32)	Kevin Durant (10)	Kevin Durant (7)	Chase Center; 18,064	31–22
54	February 13	Sacramento	W 130–125	Kevin Durant (28)	Kevin Durant (11)	Devin Booker (9)	Footprint Center; 17,071	32–22
55	February 14	Detroit	W 116–100	Kevin Durant (25)	Jusuf Nurkić (13)	Jusuf Nurkić (7)	Footprint Center; 17,071	33–22
All-Star Game
56	February 22	@ Dallas	L 113–123	Devin Booker (35)	Royce O'Neale (9)	Devin Booker (8)	American Airlines Center; 20,377	33–23
57	February 23	@ Houston	L 110–114	Kevin Durant (28)	Bol Bol (14)	Kevin Durant (8)	Toyota Center; 18,055	33–24
58	February 25	L.A. Lakers	W 123–113	Grayson Allen (24)	Jusuf Nurkić (22)	Devin Booker (9)	Footprint Center; 17,071	34–24
59	February 29	Houston	W 110–105	Devin Booker (35)	Jusuf Nurkić (13)	Royce O'Neale (7)	Footprint Center; 17,071	35–24

March: 8–7 (home: 3–3; road: 5–4)

Game	Date	Team	Score	High points	High rebounds	High assists	Location Attendance	Record
60	March 2	Houston	L 109–118	Kevin Durant (30)	Nurkić, O'Neale (10)	Nurkić, Booker (5)	Footprint Center; 17,071	35–25
61	March 3	Oklahoma City	L 110–118	Bradley Beal (31)	Jusuf Nurkić (31)	Bradley Beal (6)	Footprint Center; 17,071	35–26
62	March 5	@ Denver	W 117–107 (OT)	Kevin Durant (35)	Jusuf Nurkić (12)	three players (6)	Ball Arena; 19,589	36–26
63	March 7	Toronto	W 120–113	Kevin Durant (35)	Jusuf Nurkić (14)	Bradley Beal (8)	Footprint Center; 17,071	37–26
64	March 9	Boston	L 107–117	Kevin Durant (45)	Jusuf Nurkić (11)	Kevin Durant (6)	Footprint Center; 17,071	37–27
65	March 11	@ Cleveland	W 117–111	Kevin Durant (37)	Durant, Nurkić (8)	Devin Booker (7)	Rocket Mortgage FieldHouse; 19,432	38–27
66	March 14	@ Boston	L 112–127	Devin Booker (23)	Jusuf Nurkić (20)	Beal, Booker (7)	TD Garden; 19,156	38–28
67	March 15	@ Charlotte	W 107–96	Devin Booker (21)	Jusuf Nurkić (21)	Devin Booker (11)	Spectrum Center; 18,613	39–28
68	March 17	@ Milwaukee	L 129–140	Bradley Beal (28)	Booker, Durant (9)	Grayson Allen (8)	Fiserv Forum; 17,783	39–29
69	March 20	Philadelphia	W 115–102	Grayson Allen (32)	Jusuf Nurkić (14)	Devin Booker (11)	Footprint Center; 17,071	40–29
70	March 21	Atlanta	W 128–115	Devin Booker (30)	Jusuf Nurkić (10)	Bradley Beal (9)	Footprint Center; 17,071	41–29
71	March 23	@ San Antonio	W 131–106	Devin Booker (32)	Jusuf Nurkić (10)	Bradley Beal (12)	Frost Bank Center; 18,354	42–29
72	March 25	@ San Antonio	L 102–104	Devin Booker (36)	Jusuf Nurkić (9)	Beal, Durant (6)	Frost Bank Center; 18,044	42–30
73	March 27	@ Denver	W 104–97	Kevin Durant (30)	Kevin Durant (13)	Devin Booker (9)	Ball Arena; 19,827	43–30
74	March 29	@ Oklahoma City	L 103–128	Kevin Durant (26)	Grayson Allen (9)	Allen, Booker (5)	Paycom Center; 18,203	43–31

April: 6–2 (home: 2–2; road: 4–0)

Game	Date	Team	Score	High points	High rebounds	High assists	Location Attendance	Record
75	April 1	@ New Orleans	W 124–111	Devin Booker (52)	Jusuf Nurkić (19)	Devin Booker (9)	Smoothie King Center; 17,753	44–31
76	April 3	Cleveland	W 122–101	Devin Booker (40)	Jusuf Nurkić (10)	Devin Booker (8)	Footprint Center; 17,071	45–31
77	April 5	Minnesota	W 97–87	Grayson Allen (23)	Jusuf Nurkić (15)	Devin Booker (13)	Footprint Center; 17,071	46–31
78	April 7	New Orleans	L 105–113	Bradley Beal (33)	Jusuf Nurkić (10)	Devin Booker (7)	Footprint Center; 17,071	46–32
79	April 9	L.A. Clippers	L 92–105	Kevin Durant (21)	Royce O'Neale (11)	Devin Booker (5)	Footprint Center; 17,071	46–33
80	April 10	@ L.A. Clippers	W 124–108	Devin Booker (37)	Jusuf Nurkić (19)	Jusuf Nurkić (10)	Crypto.com Arena; 19,370	47–33
81	April 12	@ Sacramento	W 108–107	Kevin Durant (28)	Jusuf Nurkić (10)	Devin Booker (6)	Golden 1 Center; 17,832	48–33
82	April 14	@ Minnesota	W 125–106	Bradley Beal (36)	Allen, Beal (6)	Jusuf Nurkić (8)	Target Center; 18,024	49–33

2023–24 season schedule

=== Playoffs ===
2024 playoff game log
Total: 0–4 (home: 0–2; road: 0–2)
First Round: 0–4 (home: 0–2; road: 0–2)

Game	Date	Team	Score	High points	High rebounds	High assists	Location Attendance	Series
1	April 20	@ Minnesota	L 95–120	Kevin Durant (31)	Kevin Durant (7)	Bradley Beal (6)	Target Center; 19,478	0–1
2	April 23	@ Minnesota	L 93–105	Devin Booker (20)	Jusuf Nurkić (14)	Bradley Beal (6)	Target Center; 19,310	0–2
3	April 26	Minnesota	L 109–126	Bradley Beal (28)	Jusuf Nurkić (7)	Devin Booker (8)	Footprint Center; 17,071	0–3
4	April 28	Minnesota	L 116–122	Devin Booker (49)	Kevin Durant (9)	Devin Booker (6)	Footprint Center; 17,071	0–4

2024 playoff schedule

=== In-Season Tournament ===
This was the first regular season where all the NBA teams competed in a mid-season tournament setting due to the implementation of the 2023 NBA In-Season Tournament. During the in-season tournament period, the Suns competed in Group A of the Western Conference, which included the Memphis Grizzlies, the long-time rivaling Los Angeles Lakers, the Utah Jazz, and the Portland Trail Blazers. After losing their first ever In-Season Tournament match in a close nailbiter to the rivaling Lakers, the Suns bounced back during their seven-game winning streak in November with a close victory over the Jazz to even up their point differential. They then won through more convincing, double-digit victories over the Trail Blazers and Grizzlies, thus securing a +34 point differential for the open Wild Card spot. Following an initial scare with the New Orleans Pelicans on November 24 through them almost matching their point differential, the +34 score was enough of a difference maker for the Suns to advance as the Wild Card team of the Western Conference. Their next match in the event was on December 5 as a rematch against the Lakers, who already beat them twice earlier this season, with this game also counting as each team's 81st confirmed game of the regular season. This match also turned out to be their last, as this match ended controversially due to the referees allowing a timeout from the Lakers despite them not having possession of the ball at the time of them calling the timeout, which led to the Lakers winning 106–103 and later winning the inaugural In-Season Tournament afterward. As for the Suns, their 82nd game of the regular season was now going to involve a fifth match against the Sacramento Kings, who lost to the New Orleans Pelicans in the In-Season Tournament a match earlier.

==== West group A ====
Pos	Team	Pld	W	L	PF	PA	PD	Qualification	LAL	PHX	UTA	POR	MEM
1	Los Angeles Lakers	4	4	0	494	420	+74	Advance to knockout stage	—	122–119	131–99	107–95	134–107
2	Phoenix Suns	4	3	1	480	446	+34	Advance to knockout stage	119–122	—	131–128	120–107	110–89
3	Utah Jazz	4	2	2	469	482	−13		99–131	128–131	—	115–99	127–121
4	Portland Trail Blazers	4	1	3	416	455	−39		95–107	107–120	99–115	—	115–113 (OT)
5	Memphis Grizzlies	4	0	4	430	486	−56		107–134	89–110	121–127	113–115 (OT)	—

Source: NBA
Rules for classification: Tiebreakers

Games

Note: Times are Eastern Time (UTC−4 or UTC−5) as listed by the NBA. If the venue is located in a different time zone, the local time is also given.

ESPN

November 10
10:00 P.M. (8:00 P.M. Mountain)

Recap

Los Angeles Lakers 122, Phoenix Suns 119
Scoring by quarter: 25–34, 30–29, 34–33, 33–23
Pts: LeBron James 32; Rebs: Davis, James 11 each Asts: D'Angelo Russell 9	Pts: Kevin Durant 38; Rebs: Allen, Durant, Nurkić 9 each Asts: Jusuf Nurkić 7

Footprint Center, Phoenix, AZ
Attendance: 17,071
Referees:
- No. 24 Kevin Scott
- No. 68 Jacyn Goble
- No. 37 Eric Dalen

ESPN

November 17
10:00 P.M. (8:00 P.M. Mountain)

Recap

Phoenix Suns 131, Utah Jazz 128
Scoring by quarter: 41–38, 34–37, 27–24, 29–29
Pts: Kevin Durant 38; Rebs: Kevin Durant 9 Asts: Devin Booker 15	Pts: Jordan Clarkson 37; Rebs: John Collins 14; Asts: Kelly Olynyk 7

Delta Center, Salt Lake City, UT
Attendance: 18,206
Referees:
- No. 55 Bill Kennedy
- No. 38 Michael Smith
- No. 70 Phenizee Ransom

NBA League Pass

November 21
9:00 P.M. (7:00 P.M. Mountain)

Recap

Portland Trail Blazers 107, Phoenix Suns 120
Scoring by quarter: 21–34, 30–22, 31–38, 25–26
Pts: Jerami Grant 26; Rebs: Deandre Ayton 8 Asts: Jerami Grant 6	Pts: Kevin Durant 31; Rebs: Jusuf Nurkić 12; Asts: Kevin Durant 9

Footprint Center, Phoenix, AZ
Attendance: 17,071
Referees:
- No. 4 Sean Wright
- No. 64 Justin Van Duyne
- No. 91 Che Flores

NBA TV

November 24
5:00 P.M. (4:00 P.M. Central)

Recap

Phoenix Suns 110, Memphis Grizzlies 89
Scoring by quarter: 29–27, 33–22, 19–24, 29–16
Pts: Devin Booker 40; Rebs: Jusuf Nurkić 10; Asts: Jusuf Nurkić 6	Pts: Santi Aldama 21; Rebs: Jaren Jackson Jr. 7 Asts: Desmond Bane 10

FedExForum, Memphis, TN
Attendance: 17,794
Referees:
- No. 46 Ben Taylor
- No. 38 Michael Smith
- No. 96 Intae Hwang

TNT

December 5
10:00 P.M. (7:00 P.M. Pacific)

Recap

Phoenix Suns 103, Los Angeles Lakers 106
Scoring by quarter: 23–33, 24–26, 35–24, 21–23
Pts: Kevin Durant 31; Rebs: Devin Booker 11; Asts: Devin Booker 6	Pts: LeBron James 31; Rebs: Anthony Davis 15; Asts: LeBron James 11

Crypto.com Arena, Los Angeles, CA
Attendance: 18,664
Referees:
- No. 58 Josh Tiven
- No. 37 Eric Dalen
- No. 49 Tom Washington

== Awards, honors and records ==
- On August 9, 2023, the Phoenix Suns announced that both Shawn Marion's #31 and Amar'e Stoudemire's #32 would be inducted into the Phoenix Suns Ring of Honor during this season.
  - During their regular season home debut against the Utah Jazz on October 28, 2023, the Phoenix Suns unveiled their "reimagined" Ring of Honor with every member represented by either themself or family members being introduced by new owner Mat Ishbia and being given commemorative watches by him before unveiling the new Ring of Honor design at halftime. With this event, the Suns made sure that Tom Chambers, Dan Majerle, Charles Barkley, and Steve Nash had their numbers properly retired by the team after only being honored initially. The Suns ultimately won the game 126–104, though it was the last public appearance of Walter Davis, who died days later through natural causes on November 2, 2023.
  - Shawn Marion's number was retired on December 15, 2023, against the New York Knicks. Unlike prior retirement ceremonies for the Ring of Honor, this one happened after the end of the night's game, which ended in a brutal 139–122 defeat that also saw Bradley Beal getting injured early in the game. However, the ceremony featured most existing Ring of Honor members, as well as Marion's past Suns teammates, Dirk Nowitzki, and Marion's family members as guests of honor.
  - Amar'e Stoudemire's #32 was retired on March 2, 2024, against the Houston Rockets. Like most other Suns Ring of Honor ceremonies, this one happened at halftime instead of at the end of the game, which resulted in a 119–108 defeat that also saw injuries to Jusuf Nurkić, Devin Booker, and Royce O'Neale during the game, as well as a surprise ejection toward Bradley Beal during the third quarter. For this Ring of Honor ceremony, some former Suns teammates of Stoudemire's (primarily from the Seven Seconds Or Less era, including Ring of Honor members Steve Nash and Shawn Marion) celebrated the ceremony alongside Stoudemire's wife and four children.
- Following the conclusion of the 2023 NBA In-Season Tournament, Kevin Durant would be named a member of the inaugural All-Tournament Team on December 11, 2023.
- On March 7, 2024, it was confirmed that the Phoenix Suns would host the 2027 NBA All-Star Game. This will be their fourth hosting of the NBA All-Star Game after the 2009, 1995, and 1975 games.
- On April 5, 2024, long-time former Suns player Walter Davis would join one-time former Suns player Vince Carter and former Phoenix Mercury All-Star Michele Timms as honorary members for the Naismith Basketball Hall of Fame for the Class of 2024.
- On May 22, 2024, both Kevin Durant and Devin Booker were named to All-NBA Teams for their consistent production and meeting the new quality standard of at least 65 games played for this season. For Durant, he was named to the All-NBA Second Team for the fifth time in his career (his 11th overall All-NBA selection), as well as it being his first entry while with the Suns. As for Booker, he would barely qualify over Jaylen Brown for the final spot on the All-NBA Third Team, which would be his second All-NBA Team honor following his All-NBA First Team honor in 2022. This has now become the team's 12th pair of teammates to be named onto All-NBA Teams in the same season.

=== Week/Month ===
- On November 27, 2023, Devin Booker won his eighth Player of the Week Award, winning it for the period of November 20–26, 2023. That week Booker averaged 30.3 points (including a season-high 40 points from an In-Season Tournament match against the Memphis Grizzlies), 7.8 assists, 5.3 rebounds, and 1.5 steals per game during a perfect 4–0 week. Booker holds the franchise record for most Player of the Week honors.
- On January 22, 2024, Kevin Durant won his first Player of the Week Award with the Suns (32nd overall), for the period of January 15–21, 2024. During that week, Durant averaged 31.0 points on 60.0% field goal shooting (47.6% three-point shooting), 6.3 rebounds, and 2.3 blocks per game during a perfect 3–0 week, including a record game where he scored 40 points without attempting a single free-throw. Durant ranks third for the most Player of the Week Award honors behind Kobe Bryant with 33 and LeBron James who has 67 honors as of that date. His teammate Devin Booker was also nominated for this week.
- One week after Kevin Durant won Player of the Week on January 22, Devin Booker won the ninth Player of the Week Award of his career on January 29, 2024, winning the award for the week of January 22–28, 2024 despite the Suns finishing with a 2–2 record that week. During the week, Booker averaged 42.0 points through 63.9% field goal shooting, 70.1% two-point field goal shooting, 50.0% three-point shooting, and 82.9% free-throw shooting; he also averaged 5.0 rebounds and 1.3 steals per game. His lowest-scoring game that week was on January 22 with 16 points in a comeback win over the Chicago Bulls, while his best scoring game happened on January 26 with 62 points scored in a crushing loss to the Indiana Pacers on a night that also saw Luka Dončić score 73 points in a win against the Atlanta Hawks, though Booker and the Suns would beat Dončić and the Mavericks on January 24 with Booker starting a streak of scoring over 40 points during that week (and by extension, continuing a streak that saw at least one Suns player scoring at least 40 points starting back on January 19 by Booker himself). Not only does this extend Booker's Player of the Week franchise record, but with Kevin Durant's Player of the Week honor from the prior week, it marked the first time that the Suns had players that won the award in back-to-back weeks since Steve Nash won the award on January 21 & 28, 2007.
- Three days after winning his second Player of the Week Award of the season, Devin Booker won his third Player of the Month Award for his career on February 1, 2023, for his performances throughout January 2023. With him previously winning the honor for both February 2021 and the combined months of October & November 2022, Booker broke a previous six-way tie between himself, Charles Barkley, Kevin Johnson, Shawn Marion, Steve Nash, and Amar'e Stoudemire to become the sole franchise leader for most of these honors held in franchise history. Throughout the 16 games played in January 2023, Booker averaged 30.0 points on 53.9% field goal shooting and 40.0% three-point shooting, 6.3 assists, and 4.3 rebounds per game to give the Suns an 11–5 record for the month and help improve their standings by February 2024 after ending December 2023 with a barely above-average 17–15 record. Booker also achieved records previously held by Michael Jordan and Wilt Chamberlain during the team's seven-game road stretch that month.

=== All-Star ===
- On January 25, 2024, Kevin Durant was voted by the NBA and its fans as one of the five Western Conference starters (and one of three frontcourt starters) for the 2024 NBA All-Star Game. This ties him for All-Star nods at seventh overall with 14 total All-Star selections in NBA history alongside other NBA greats like Jerry West, Michael Jordan, Karl Malone, and Dirk Nowitzki. This is also his first official selection to the All-Star Game as a starter while with the Phoenix Suns properly (while he joined the team last season, he officially made the 2023 NBA All-Star Game as a member of the Brooklyn Nets, plus he did not play at the event properly that year), thus making him the franchise's first official All-Star starter since Steve Nash and Amar'e Stoudemire were both named starters in 2010. Durant would get 18 points, 5 rebounds, 5 assists, and 2 steals in 24:51 of action as a starter in an unprecedented 211–186 defeat for the Western Conference.
- Less than a week later, on the same day Devin Booker won the Player of the Month Award for January 2023, on February 1, Devin Booker was also named one of the seven All-Star reserve players (as determined by the NBA's head coaches) for the Western Conference in the 2024 NBA All-Star Game. This not only became his fourth All-Star appearance in the last five seasons, but he joins Connie Hawkins, Paul Westphal, Charles Barkley, Shawn Marion, Amar'e Stoudemire, Walter Davis, and Steve Nash as the only Suns players to have at least four All-Star selections while with the franchise. Booker would get 15 points, 7 assists, 4 rebounds, and 2 steals in 19:05 of action off the bench for the Western Conference's 211–186 defeat to the Eastern Conference.

=== Season ===
- Grayson Allen finished the season as the season leader in three-point shooting percentage with 46.1% three-pointers made. He became the second Suns player behind Craig Hodges (and first player to be with the team throughout an entire season) to lead the NBA in three-point field goal shooting percentages in a season with 445 three-point field goal attempts.

=== Records ===
- On March 3, 2024, Jusuf Nurkić tied a 21st-century record for most rebounds in one game in NBA history (set by Kevin Love in 2010) with 31 rebounds in a 118–110 loss to the Oklahoma City Thunder. He set this new career-high a day after being injured during the previous night's game by a bump with his teammate, Josh Okogie.
- On April 1, 2024, Devin Booker recorded his third straight game of scoring over 50 points against the New Orleans Pelicans, this time scoring 52 points (including recording a new career-high eight three-pointers made) in a 124–111 win after previously scoring 52 earlier in the season on January 19, 2024, in a 123–109 win at New Orleans and scoring 58 last season on December 17, 2022, in a 118–114 win in Phoenix. He would tie Wilt Chamberlain's record of three straight games of over 50 points in games with the Philadelphia Warriors against the Los Angeles Lakers early in the 1961–62 season as the only other player to record such a feat in the NBA against one specific opponent.
- Devin Booker and Kevin Durant would be the third pair of teammates in NBA history (and the first pair of non-Los Angeles Lakers teammates) to average over 27 points per game throughout an entire season, joining the likes of Shaquille O'Neal and Kobe Bryant during the 2000–01 & 2002–03 seasons and Elgin Baylor and Jerry West during the 1964–65 season.

=== Team records ===
- On January 5, 2024, Grayson Allen tied former Suns players Quentin Richardson, Channing Frye, Aron Baynes, Cameron Johnson, and Landry Shamet for the franchise record of most three-pointers made in a single game with 9 made in a 113–97 win over the Miami Heat.
  - Eleven days later, Grayson Allen tied the record with 9 three-pointers made for 27 points scored in a historic game where the Suns had a 22-point fourth quarter comeback and a 32–8 comeback stretch late in the game to upset the Sacramento Kings to win 119–117 at home.
  - On March 20, 2024, Grayson Allen had his third game of the season where he tied the franchise record of 9 three-pointers made with 32 points made in a 115–102 win over the Philadelphia 76ers in a night that also saw Kevin Durant surpass former Suns player Shaquille O'Neal for the 8th-most points scored in the NBA and saw Isaiah Thomas officially return to the Suns.
- On January 21, 2024, Kevin Durant became the first player in franchise history to score 40 points in a game while not recording a single free-throw attempt.
- On March 3, 2024, Jusuf Nurkić broke the franchise record for most rebounds grabbed in a single game for the Suns with 31 in a 118–110 loss to the Oklahoma City Thunder. The previous franchise record was 27 set by Tyson Chandler in January 2016.

=== Milestones ===
- On October 31, 2023, Kevin Durant passed Hakeem Olajuwon to become 12th on the NBA's all-time scoring list. Durant scored a team-high 26 points that night in an upset 115–114 loss to the San Antonio Spurs.
- On November 21, 2023, Kevin Durant passed Elvin Hayes for 11th place on the NBA's all-time scoring list. Durant scored 31 points during an In-Season Tournament match where they won 120–107 over Deandre Ayton and the Portland Trail Blazers.
- On December 1, 2023, Kevin Durant passed Moses Malone to enter the top 10 in the all-time scoring list. Durant recorded a double-double of 30 points and 11 assists that night in a 119–111 loss to the defending champion Denver Nuggets.
- On February 23, 2024, Kevin Durant passed Carmelo Anthony for 9th place on the NBA's all-time scoring list. Durant surpassed Anthony around the start of the fourth quarter with a free-throw, later finishing the night with a double-double of 28 points and 11 rebounds in a 114–110 loss to the Houston Rockets that also saw his teammate, Bol Bol, get season-highs of 25 points and 14 rebounds off the bench that same game.
- On March 20, 2024, Kevin Durant surpassed former Suns player Shaquille O'Neal to finish the season in 8th place on the NBA's all-time scoring list. Durant would surpass O'Neal with a midrange jumpshot at 10:22 in the third quarter and later finish the night with 22 points scored in a 115–102 win over the Philadelphia 76ers on a night that also saw Grayson Allen tie his personal record (and franchise record) for most three-pointers made in a single game for a third game this season and saw the official return of Isaiah Thomas with the Suns.

=== Team milestones ===
- On February 13, 2024, Devin Booker surpassed long-time Suns center Alvan Adams to become the second-highest scoring Suns player in franchise history, reaching a milestone high of 13,918 points at the end of the Suns' 130–125 win over the Sacramento Kings. He would first tie Adams' mark by hitting a game-changing shot that gave Phoenix the lead for good with 2:37 left in the fourth quarter before expanding the team's lead moments later with another mid-range jumpshot to surpass Adams with 2:16 left in the game.

== Injuries/Personal missed games ==
Player	Duration		Reason(s) for missed time	Games missed
Player	Start	End	Reason(s) for missed time	Games missed
Damion Lee	October 1, 2023	The Entire Season	Tore right meniscus during training camp.	82 + 4*
Bradley Beal	October 19, 2023	November 8, 2023	Tight lower back	7
Devin Booker	October 26, 2023	November 2, 2023	Sore left foot	2
Devin Booker	November 4, 2023	November 15, 2023	Sore left ankle and calf	5
Bradley Beal	November 15, 2023	Unknown	Nerve irritation relating to lower back strain	??
Yuta Watanabe	November 18, 2023	November 26, 2023	Left quad contusion	4
Drew Eubanks	November 24, 2023	November 26, 2023	Left ankle sprain	1
Kevin Durant	November 24, 2023	Unknown	Sore right foot	?
Grayson Allen	November 26, 2023	Unknown	Illness	?

* - Number of games lost during the NBA Playoffs.

== Player statistics ==
Legend
GP	Games played	GS	Games started	MPG	Minutes per game
FG%	Field-goal percentage	3P%	3-point field-goal percentage	FT%	Free-throw percentage
RPG	Rebounds per game	APG	Assists per game	SPG	Steals per game
BPG	Blocks per game	PPG	Points per game

=== Regular season ===
Phoenix Suns statistics
Player	GP	GS	MPG	FG%	3P%	FT%	RPG	APG	SPG	BPG	PPG
Grayson Allen	75	74	33.5	.499	.461	.878	3.9	3.0	.9	.6	13.5
Udoka Azubuike	16	0	7.1	.696		.231	2.0	.2	.1	.4	2.2
Keita Bates-Diop^{†}	39	8	15.3	.427	.313	.722	2.6	.9	.6	.5	4.5
Bradley Beal	53	53	33.3	.513	.430	.813	4.4	5.0	1.0	.5	18.2
Bol Bol	43	0	10.9	.616	.423	.789	3.2	.4	.2	.6	5.2
Devin Booker	68	68	36.0	.492	.364	.886	4.5	6.9	.9	.4	27.1
Kevin Durant	75	75	37.2	.523	.413	.856	6.6	5.0	.9	1.2	27.1
Drew Eubanks	75	6	15.6	.601	1.000	.774	4.3	.8	.4	.8	5.1
Jordan Goodwin^{†}	40	0	14.0	.389	.288	.862	2.9	2.0	.6	.2	5.0
Eric Gordon	68	24	27.8	.443	.378	.797	1.8	2.0	1.0	.4	11.0
Saben Lee	24	0	7.7	.364	.125	.744	1.3	1.3	.3	.1	3.0
Nassir Little	45	2	10.2	.460	.300	.850	1.7	.5	.2	.2	3.4
Théo Maledon^{†}	4	0	3.3	.250		1.000	.3	.0	.0	.0	1.3
Chimezie Metu^{†}	37	5	12.1	.508	.294	.884	3.0	.5	.5	.2	5.0
Jusuf Nurkić	76	76	27.3	.510	.244	.640	11.0	4.0	1.1	1.1	10.9
Royce O'Neale^{†}	30	8	25.1	.411	.376	.692	5.2	2.7	.9	.5	8.1
Josh Okogie	60	11	16.0	.417	.309	.745	2.6	1.1	.8	.4	4.6
David Roddy^{†}	17	0	3.7	.435	.125	1.000	.6	.2	.1	.0	1.3
Isaiah Thomas	6	0	3.2	.300	.500		.0	.5	.0	.0	1.3
Ish Wainright^{†}	4	0	4.0	.167	.250		1.3	.3	.5	.0	.8
Yuta Watanabe^{†}	29	0	13.2	.361	.320	.667	1.6	.3	.3	.2	3.6
Thaddeus Young^{†}	10	0	8.9	.524	.000	.333	2.8	.7	.5	.2	2.3

=== Playoffs ===
Phoenix Suns statistics
Player	GP	GS	MPG	FG%	3P%	FT%	RPG	APG	SPG	BPG	PPG
Grayson Allen	2	2	21.5	.200	.200	1.000	4.0	1.0	.5	.0	3.5
Bradley Beal	4	4	38.5	.441	.435	.800	2.8	4.5	.8	.3	16.5
Bol Bol	3	0	4.3	.333			1.3	.0	.3	.0	.7
Devin Booker	4	4	41.5	.492	.350	.951	3.3	6.0	1.8	.3	27.5
Kevin Durant	4	4	42.0	.552	.417	.824	6.5	3.3	.5	1.5	26.8
Drew Eubanks	3	0	12.3	.583		1.000	1.3	.0	.7	.3	5.7
Eric Gordon	4	0	29.5	.321	.412	.875	1.8	1.3	1.3	.5	8.0
Nassir Little	4	0	3.5	.600	.333		.3	.0	.0	.0	1.8
Jusuf Nurkić	4	4	26.0	.500	.000	.455	8.3	2.8	1.5	1.5	7.8
Royce O'Neale	4	2	26.0	.318	.333		4.8	1.0	.3	.0	5.0
Josh Okogie	4	0	7.3	.556	.333	.500	1.0	.5	.5	.0	3.5
David Roddy	2	0	1.5				.0	.0	.0	.0	.0
Isaiah Thomas	1	0	4.0	.000	.000		.0	.0	.0	.0	.0
Thaddeus Young	1	0	4.0				.0	.0	.0	.0	.0

- ^{†} Denotes player spent time with another team in the season. Stats reflect time with the Suns only.

== Transactions ==
=== Trades ===
June 24, 2023	Three–team trade
June 24, 2023	To Phoenix Suns (United States) Bradley Beal (from Washington) (United States) Jordan Goodwin (from Washington) (United States) Isaiah Todd (from Washington)	To Indiana Pacers Draft rights to #8 pick Jarace Walker (from Washington) 2028 second-round pick (from Phoenix) 2029 second-round pick (from Washington)
June 24, 2023	To Washington Wizards (United States) Chris Paul (from Phoenix) (United States) Landry Shamet (from Phoenix) Draft rights to #7 pick Bilal Coulibaly (from Indiana) Right to swap 2024 first-round pick with Phoenix Right to swap 2026 first-round pick with Phoenix Right to swap 2028 first-round pick with Phoenix Right to swap 2030 first-round pick with Phoenix 2024 second-round pick (from Phoenix) 2025 second-round pick (from Phoenix) 2026 second-round pick (from Phoenix) 2027 second-round pick (from Phoenix) 2030 second-round pick (from Phoenix) Cash considerations (from Phoenix)
July 11, 2023	To Phoenix Suns 2025 second-round pick (from New Orleans) 2028 second-round pick (from Memphis) 2029 second-round pick (from Memphis)	To Memphis Grizzlies (United States) Isaiah Todd Right to swap 2024 first-round pick with Phoenix Right to swap 2030 first-round pick with Phoenix
July 17, 2023	To Phoenix Suns ~~2024 second-round pick (from Denver)~~ 2026 second-round pick (from Detroit) 2028 Top-45 protected second-round pick (from Boston)	To Orlando Magic Right to swap 2026 first-round pick with Phoenix
July 17, 2023	To Phoenix Suns 2024 heavily protected second-round pick $6.5 million traded player exception	To San Antonio Spurs (United States) Cameron Payne 2025 second-round pick (from New Orleans) Cash considerations
September 27, 2023	Three–team trade
September 27, 2023	To Phoenix Suns (United States) Grayson Allen (from Milwaukee) (Bosnia and Herzegovina) Jusuf Nurkić (from Portland) (United States) Nassir Little (from Portland) (United States) Keon Johnson (from Portland)	To Portland Trail Blazers (The Bahamas) Deandre Ayton (from Phoenix) (Belgium) Toumani Camara (from Phoenix) (United States) Jrue Holiday (from Milwaukee) 2029 first-round pick (from Milwaukee) Right to swap 2028 first-round pick with Milwaukee Right to swap 2030 first-round pick with Milwaukee
September 27, 2023	To Milwaukee Bucks (United States) Damian Lillard (from Portland)
February 8, 2024	Three–team trade
February 8, 2024	To Phoenix Suns (United States) Royce O'Neale (from Brooklyn) (United States) David Roddy (from Memphis)	To Memphis Grizzlies (Japan) Yuta Watanabe (from Phoenix) (Nigeria) / (United States) Chimezie Metu (from Phoenix) Right to swap 2026 first-round pick with the least valuable option between Phoenix, Orlando, and Washington
February 8, 2024	To Brooklyn Nets (United States) Keita Bates-Diop (from Phoenix) (United States) Jordan Goodwin (from Phoenix) 2026 second-round pick (from Phoenix via Detroit) 2028 second-round pick (from Phoenix via Memphis) 2029 second-round pick (from Phoenix via Memphis) Draft rights to Vanja Marinković (from Memphis)

I: Initially, the Phoenix Suns would have acquired the least valuable pick between themselves and from either the Washington Wizards or the New York Knicks in 2024 due to a previous trade the Wizards and the Knicks did that allowed the Knicks the option to acquire the Wizards' first-round pick in 2024 if it was outside of the Top 12 that year. However, with their later trade with the Memphis Grizzlies in July 2023, the Suns now acquired the least valuable pick between themselves, the Wizards (or Knicks), and the Grizzlies, while the Grizzlies acquired the middle pick of the available options at hand instead. For the Suns, they ultimately kept their pick as it originally was (as the 22nd pick, which became DaRon Holmes II) anyway due to Washington utilizing their plans to tank this season for a high draft pick as one of the worst teams of the NBA during this time, Memphis suffering from many different injuries throughout the season to become a lottery team, and Phoenix becoming a last-minute Playoff team to close out the regular season. The same would also apply for the Wizards and Grizzlies with Washington's pick being at #2 (which became Alex Sarr) and Memphis' pick being at #9 (which became Zach Edey) in 2024, thus making each of the pick swaps become ultimately irrelevant for 2024.
II: Originally, the Phoenix Suns would just acquire the least valuable pick between themselves and the Washington Wizards in 2026 due to their Bradley Beal trade in June (although if the Wizards' 2025 first-round pick had gone to the Knicks via being outside of Top 10 protections instead of stayed with them due to them being one of the worst teams that season, the Suns would have automatically kept their pick by default due to the Ted Stepien rule). However, due to their July trade with the Orlando Magic, the Suns would have acquired the least valuable pick between themselves, the Wizards (presuming they keep their pick for 2026 as a Top 8 protection), and the Magic, with Orlando having unprotected swap rights in the process. Despite that, another trade with the Memphis Grizzlies being involved on the February 8, 2024 trade deadline now made it so that the Grizzlies would acquire the second-least valuable draft pick between Memphis themselves, the Suns, the Magic, and the Wizards (who are also considered likely to trade their own pick to the Knicks due to a previous deal the Wizards made), while the Suns would have still acquired the least valuable option at hand from those four teams before the following season's trade deadline allowed for the Charlotte Hornets to take on the Suns' draft pick rights that upcoming year instead. By the end of that season, the Washington Wizards would continue to be one of the worst teams in the NBA (to the point of acquiring the #1 pick of the draft that year, which resulted in them selecting AJ Dybantsa with that pick) and the Memphis Grizzlies were also next to them in terms of awfulness that same season (which resulted in them getting Cameron Boozer with the #3 pick there), while the Phoenix Suns (technically Charlotte Hornets) and Orlando Magic would swap first round picks this time around due to Phoenix having a better draft position in the first round than Orlando that season despite them having the same record that season. This led to the Orlando Magic drafting Bennett Stirtz with the #16 pick of the draft and the Charlotte Hornets drafting Christian Anderson Jr. with the #18 pick of the draft, with the Suns eventually drafting Arizona native Koa Peat with the #30 pick of that draft at the end of the first round.
III: The Phoenix Suns will acquire the least valuable of the first-round picks in 2028 between themselves, the Washington Wizards, and either the Brooklyn Nets or the Philadelphia 76ers due to the combination of the Suns' trade for Kevin Durant from the previous season and a trade the Nets did with the 76ers that allows them the option to acquire Philadelphia's first-round pick in 2028 if it is between picks 9 and 30.
IV: The Phoenix Suns initially held the rights to only the least valuable first-round pick between themselves and the Washington Wizards in 2030 due to the Bradley Beal trade in June. However, with their later trade with the Memphis Grizzlies in July, the Suns now would hold the least valuable first-round selection between themselves, the Grizzlies, and the Wizards, with Memphis holding the middle pick of the available options at hand.
V: On October 25, 2023, the NBA punished the Phoenix Suns for tampering violations via engaging in free agency conversations with former Portland Trail Blazers center Drew Eubanks earlier than they were allowed to do so by taking away the 2024 second-round pick they had acquired from the defending champion Denver Nuggets via the Orlando Magic from their July trade with the Magic. Had that pick been conveyed properly, it would have been a late second round pick for the 2024 NBA draft instead.
VI: Due to previous trades the Orlando Magic had with both the Detroit Pistons and the Milwaukee Bucks, the Suns were originally involved with acquiring the least valuable second-round option between the Magic, Pistons, and Bucks in 2026. However, thanks to their three-team trade with the Brooklyn Nets and Memphis Grizzlies on the February 8, 2024 trade deadline, the Brooklyn Nets would now get the least valuable second-round option from those three teams instead. Surprisingly, by the end of that season, it would be the Detroit Pistons that would be the best team of those three teams that season (and by a pretty wide margin, to boot), with that selection ultimately becoming Jaron Pierre Jr. with the #58 pick of the draft that year.
VII: The San Antonio Spurs' 2024 second-round pick that was traded from the Cameron Payne deal in July allowed for the Phoenix Suns to acquire San Antonio's pick only if that selection was around picks #50–54. If San Antonio's pick went to around picks #55–58 for 2024 (there would be no 59th or 60th pick in that year's draft as of October 25, 2023 due to tampering violations relating to the Philadelphia 76ers in the previous season and the Phoenix Suns themselves this season), that pick would go to the Boston Celtics instead due to a prior trade the Spurs did with the Celtics in the previous season. However, due to the Spurs being one of the worst teams in the NBA this season, the second-round pick would not be conveyed to Phoenix or Boston. Instead, it would be kept by San Antonio entering the 2024 NBA draft since it remained in the #31-49 range (specifically at pick #35, which became Johnny Furphy).

=== Free agency ===
==== Re-signed ====
Player	Signed	Date
Damion Lee	Signed 2-year partially guaranteed deal worth $5,373,575	July 7, 2023
Josh Okogie	Signed 2-year partially guaranteed deal worth $5,772,671	July 11, 2023
Saben Lee	Signed two-way contract worth $559,782	July 13, 2023
Grayson Allen	Signed 4-year contract extension worth $70 Million	April 15, 2024

==== Additions ====
Player	Signed	Former team(s)
Keita Bates-Diop	Signed 2-year partially guaranteed deal worth $5,001,258	San Antonio Spurs
Drew Eubanks	Signed 2-year partially guaranteed deal worth $5,001,258	Portland Trail Blazers
Chimezie Metu	Signed 1-year deal worth $2,346,614	Sacramento Kings
Yuta Watanabe	Signed 2-year partially guaranteed deal worth $5,001,258	Brooklyn Nets
Eric Gordon	Signed 2-year partially guaranteed deal worth $6,552,719	Los Angeles Clippers
Bol Bol	Signed 1-year deal worth $2,019,706	Orlando Magic
Udoka Azubuike	Signed two-way contract worth $559,782	Utah Jazz
Théo Maledon	Signed two-way contract worth $559,782	Charlotte Hornets / Greensboro Swarm
Thaddeus Young	Signed 1-year buyout deal worth $1,010,371	(Canada) Toronto Raptors / Brooklyn Nets
Ish Wainright	Signed two-way contract worth $135,120	Portland Trail Blazers / Rip City Remix
Isaiah Thomas	Signed two 10-day contracts / rest of the season deal worth $477,630	Salt Lake City Stars / Phoenix Suns

==== Subtractions ====
Player	Reason left	New team(s)
Chris Paul	Traded	Washington Wizards / Golden State Warriors
Landry Shamet	Traded	Washington Wizards
Jock Landale	Unrestricted free agent	Houston Rockets
Isaiah Todd	Traded	Memphis Grizzlies / NBA G League Ignite
Torrey Craig	Unrestricted free agent	Chicago Bulls
Darius Bazley	Unrestricted free agent	Brooklyn Nets / Delaware Blue Coats / Philadelphia 76ers / Utah Jazz / Salt Lake City Stars
Cameron Payne	Traded	San Antonio Spurs / Milwaukee Bucks / Philadelphia 76ers
Deandre Ayton	Traded	Portland Trail Blazers
Toumani Camara	Traded	Portland Trail Blazers
Bismack Biyombo	Waived / Unrestricted free agent	Memphis Grizzlies / Oklahoma City Thunder
Terrence Ross	Waived / Unrestricted free agent	—N/a (Retired)
T. J. Warren	Waived / Unrestricted free agent	Minnesota Timberwolves
Ish Wainright	Waived	Portland Trail Blazers / Rip City Remix / Phoenix Suns
Keon Johnson	Waived	Brooklyn Nets / Long Island Nets
Keita Bates-Diop	Traded	Brooklyn Nets
Jordan Goodwin	Traded	Brooklyn Nets / Memphis Grizzlies
Chimezie Metu	Traded	Memphis Grizzlies / Detroit Pistons
Yuta Watanabe	Traded	Memphis Grizzlies
Théo Maledon	Waived two-way contract	Sioux Falls Skyforce
