= Drew Eubanks =

American basketball player (born 1997)

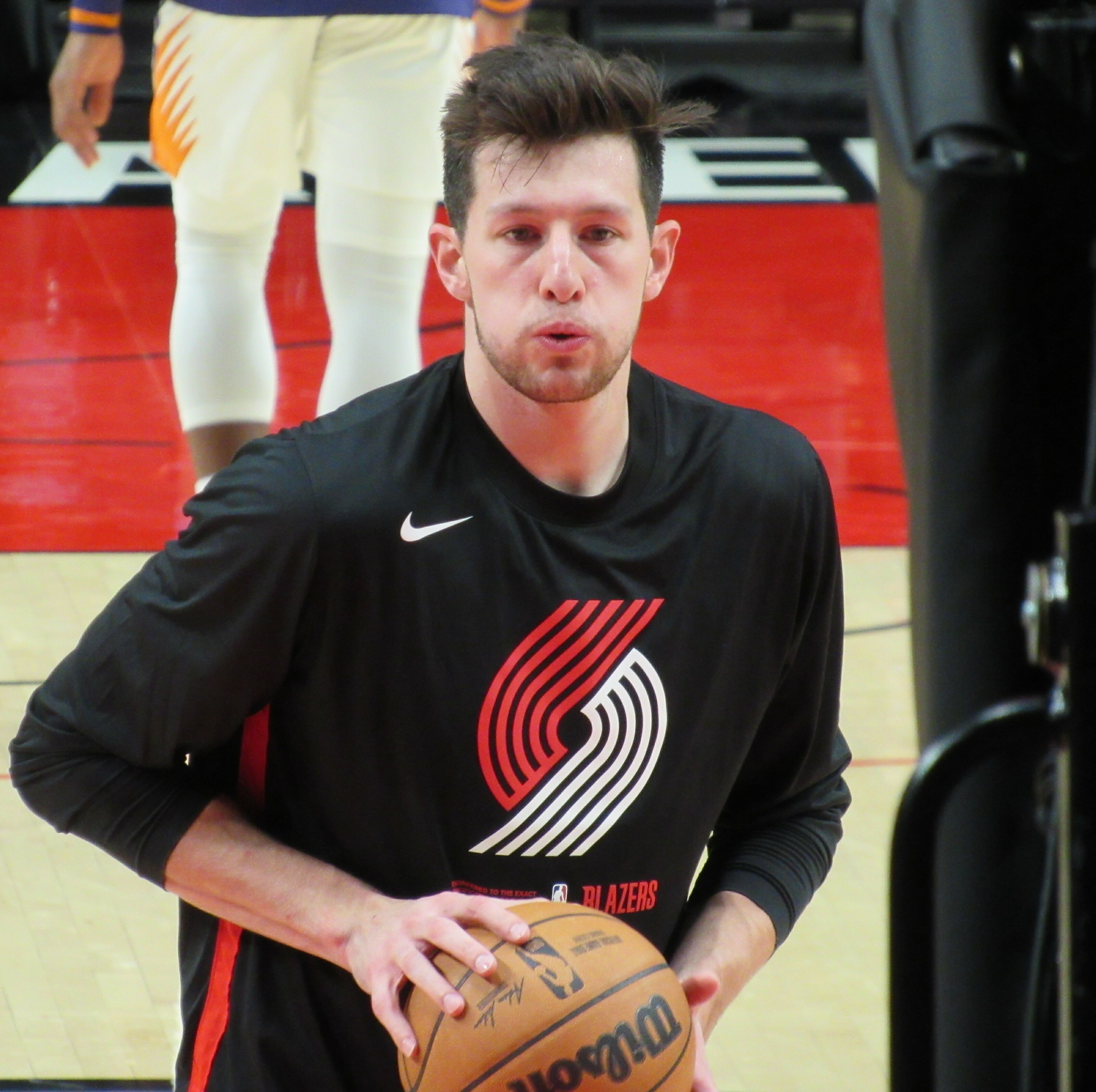
- Eubanks with the Portland Trail Blazers in 2022

Free agent
- Position: Center

Personal information
- Born: February 1, 1997 (age 29) Starkville, Mississippi, U.S.
- Listed height: 6 ft 10 in (2.08 m)
- Listed weight: 245 lb (111 kg)

Career information
- High school: Reynolds (Troutdale, Oregon)
- College: Oregon State (2015–2018)
- NBA draft: 2018: undrafted
- Playing career: 2018–present

Career history
- 2018–2022: San Antonio Spurs
- 2018–2020: →Austin Spurs
- 2022–2023: Portland Trail Blazers
- 2023–2024: Phoenix Suns
- 2024–2025: Utah Jazz
- 2025: Los Angeles Clippers
- 2025–2026: Sacramento Kings
- Stats at NBA.com
- Stats at Basketball Reference

Drew Eubanks (/ˈjuːbæŋks/ YOO-banks; born February 1, 1997) is an American professional basketball player who last played for the Sacramento Kings of the National Basketball Association (NBA). He played college basketball for the Oregon State Beavers.

== Early life ==
Eubanks was born in Starkville, Mississippi, and lived in Louisville, Mississippi, before moving to Troutdale, Oregon, at age 2.

== College career ==
Eubanks played for the Oregon State Beavers of the Pac-12 Conference. He was rated a 4-star recruit who was rated No. 1 in the state of Oregon and committed to the Beavers over Cal, Gonzaga, Oregon, and others.

Eubanks averaged 14.5 points, 8.3 rebounds and 2.2 blocks per game as a sophomore on a team that won five games. As a junior, Eubanks averaged 13.2 points, 6.8 rebounds and 1.7 blocks per game. He declared for the 2018 NBA draft after the season, forgoing his final season of collegiate eligibility.

== Professional career ==
=== San Antonio Spurs (2018–2022) ===
After going undrafted in the 2018 NBA draft, Eubanks signed with the San Antonio Spurs for NBA Summer League play. On September 17, 2018, Eubanks signed a two-way deal with the San Antonio Spurs. Eubanks made his NBA debut on October 20, 2018, in a 108–121 loss against the Portland Trail Blazers, playing three and a half minutes and scoring two points.

On November 24, 2020, Eubanks re-signed with the Spurs.

On 10 February 2022, Eubanks, Thaddeus Young, and a 2022 second-round selection were traded to the Toronto Raptors in exchange for Goran Dragić and a 2022 first-round draft selection. He was subsequently waived.

=== Portland Trail Blazers (2022–2023) ===
On February 22, 2022, Eubanks signed a 10-day contract with the Portland Trail Blazers. He signed a second 10-day contract on March 4, a third 10-day contract on March 14 and a fourth on March 24. On April 3, he signed a contract for the rest of the season.

On July 7, 2022, the Trail Blazers re-signed Eubanks to a 1-year deal.

=== Phoenix Suns (2023–2024) ===
On July 4, 2023, Eubanks signed a 2-year, $5 million deal with the Phoenix Suns. After making his debut with the Suns on October 24, the NBA announced on October 25 that the Suns lost one of the second-round picks they had the rights to at the time for the 2024 NBA draft due to being in contact with Eubanks before the 2023 free agency period began. On February 14, 2024, Eubanks was punched in the face by Detroit Pistons F/C Isaiah Stewart hours before the Suns' home game against the Pistons at the Footprint Center began. Despite the punch, Eubanks would still play for the Suns that night, putting up 6 points and 6 rebounds in 18 minutes for Phoenix's 116–100 win over the Pistons. On June 21, 2024, Eubanks declined his $2.6 million player option with the Suns entering free agency.

=== Utah Jazz (2024–2025) ===
On August 13, 2024, Eubanks signed a 2-year $10 million deal with the Utah Jazz.

=== Los Angeles Clippers (2025) ===
On February 1, 2025, Eubanks was traded to the Los Angeles Clippers alongside Patty Mills in exchange for Mo Bamba, P. J. Tucker, a 2030 second-round pick and cash considerations.

=== Sacramento Kings (2025–2026) ===
On July 8, 2025, the Sacramento Kings announced that they had signed Eubanks. He made 42 appearances (including 11 starts) for Sacramento during the 2025–26 season, recording averages of 5.2 points, 3.0 rebounds, and 0.5 assists. On March 15, 2026, it was announced that Eubanks would require season-ending surgery to repair a torn UCL in his left thumb.

On September 16, 2026, Eubanks signed a one–year, non–guaranteed contract with the New York Knicks. On October 16, 2026, Eubanks was waived by the New York Knicks after sustaining a torn pectoral muscle.

== Personal life ==
Eubanks married his wife Hailey on August 20, 2022. His parents are David and Laura Eubanks.

== Career statistics ==
Legend
GP	Games played	GS	Games started	MPG	Minutes per game
FG%	Field goal percentage	3P%	3-point field goal percentage	FT%	Free throw percentage
RPG	Rebounds per game	APG	Assists per game	SPG	Steals per game
BPG	Blocks per game	PPG	Points per game	**Bold**	Career high

=== NBA ===
==== Regular season ====
Year	Team	GP	GS	MPG	FG%	3P%	FT%	RPG	APG	SPG	BPG	PPG
2018–19	San Antonio	23	0	4.9	.577	—	**.846**	1.5	.3	.1	.2	1.8
2019–20	San Antonio	22	3	12.4	.642	**1.000**	.769	3.9	.7	.2	.8	4.9
2020–21	San Antonio	54	3	14.0	.566	**1.000**	.726	4.5	.8	.3	.9	5.8
2021–22	San Antonio	49	9	12.1	.528	.125	.747	4.0	1.0	.3	.6	4.7
2021–22	Portland	22	22	**29.5**	**.646**	.267	.784	**8.5**	**1.6**	**.8**	.5	**14.5**
2022–23	Portland	**78**	**28**	20.3	.641	.389	.664	5.4	1.3	.5	**1.3**	6.6
2023–24	Phoenix	75	6	15.6	.601	**1.000**	.774	4.3	.8	.4	.8	5.1
2024–25	Utah	37	4	15.4	.607	.600	.632	4.5	1.2	.3	.9	5.8
2024–25	L.A. Clippers	24	0	7.4	.551	.000	.786	2.4	.4	.1	.3	2.7
2025–26	Sacramento	42	11	13.1	.596	.143	.561	3.0	.5	.4	.6	5.2
Career		426	86	15.1	.603	.367	.710	4.3	.9	.4	.8	5.6

==== Playoffs ====
Year	Team	GP	GS	MPG	FG%	3P%	FT%	RPG	APG	SPG	BPG	PPG
2024	Phoenix	**3**	0	**12.3**	**.583**	—	**1.000**	**1.3**	.0	**.7**	**.3**	**5.7**
2025	L.A. Clippers	**3**	0	4.3	.000	—	.667	.3	.0	.0	.0	1.3
Career		6	0	8.3	.500	—	.778	.8	.0	.3	.2	3.5

=== College ===
Year	Team	GP	GS	MPG	FG%	3P%	FT%	RPG	APG	SPG	BPG	PPG
2015–16	Oregon State	**32**	30	21.4	.580	–	.635	4.6	.4	.4	1.2	7.6
2016–17	Oregon State	**32**	**32**	**32.1**	.587	–	**.712**	**8.3**	**1.2**	**.6**	**2.2**	**14.5**
2017–18	Oregon State	**32**	**32**	31.3	**.624**	–	.701	6.8	1.1	.5	1.7	13.2
Career		96	94	28.3	.598	–	.693	6.6	.9	.5	1.7	11.7
