= Robert DeStefano =

American physician (born 1962)

- Born: Robert Louis DeStefano; July 14, 1962 (age 64); New Jersey, U.S.
- Education: Kutztown University of Pennsylvania; Palmer School of Chiropractic
- Occupations: physician, sports chiropractor, author, inventor, television personality

Robert Louis DeStefano (born July 14, 1962) is an American sports chiropractor, author, and inventor. He is a team doctor for the New York-based football team the New York Giants, and competitive triathlete. He has spoken and taught manual therapies nationally for 15 years, and has appeared on The View, and Sirius and XM Radio, as well as many local TV and radio programs.

== Early life ==
DeStefano was born and raised in New Jersey. After a high school athletic career of track, football, decathlon, power-lifting, and lacrosse, DeStefano attended Kutztown University of Pennsylvania on a football scholarship, and then earned a rugby scholarship to Palmer School of Chiropractic in Davenport, Iowa, where he earned his D.C. in 1986. Soon after graduation, he earned his CCSP (Certified Chiropractic Sports Physician), and attended his first A.R.T. (Active Release Techniques) seminar.

== Career ==
=== ART instructor ===
After a few years of practicing chiropractic medicine and ART, he became an ART instructor. From the early 1990s to 2009. DeStefano has taught at over 100 ART seminars and related teaching and lecturing events. He has assisted in certifying thousands of ART providers. He is currently launching his own seminars to promote integrative healthcare and self treatment.

=== Practice ===
DeStefano opened his first offices in Ridgefield Park and in Lodi, NJ in 1987, his first NY office in 1999, at La Palestra on the upper west side. In 2002 Dr Rob became an official ART provider to the New York Football Giants, seeing them through their 2008 Super Bowl XLII Championship and continuing at present as the official ART provider and also the official Chiropractor. 2009 saw the opening of his first two satellite offices in NY, in The Orion and The Ariel. Within these offices and also in the field, he has worked with athletes of all levels including the US Olympic Bobsled/Luge/Skeleton teams, US Olympic Hockey Team, the NHL, NBA, LPGA, and the NFL. On September 15, 2009, DeStefano released his first book, Muscle Medicine, with Bryan Kelly and Joe Hooper, about the diagnosis and treatment of muscle, and muscle’s important role in the future of healthcare. He is currently developing a new treatment technique and self-treatment modality to complement doctor care that has already been successfully adopted by many of his athletes and patients. In 2010, he has plans to introduce a piece of exercise equipment, and a self-treatment tool, which is already being used by national, professional sports teams.

=== Inventor ===
DeStefano has developed two pieces of exercise equipment: a variation on the kettlebell, in development; and a self treatment tool, the F.A.S.T. Stick currently in usage by pro athletes, and available to the public in 2010.

== Works ==
=== Books and publications ===
- Muscle Medicine: The Revolutionary Approach to Maintaining, Strengthening, and Repairing your Muscle and Joints. Simon and Schuster, 2009.

=== Television ===
- “The View” on NBC
- “America's Newsroom” on Fox News
- "To Your Health" on Channel 12 News.

=== Radio ===
- Morning Show"/WGAU Radio (Athens, GA) 9/17/2009
- Broadminded"/Sirius XM Satellite Radio, 9/18/2009
- Morning Living Show" Martha Stewart Radio 9/25/2009
- Empty Nesters" 10/21/2009

== Personal life ==
DeStefano has four children – Jason, Amy, Jacob and Devyn. In addition to his practices, work with the Giants, book and equipment development, Dr. Rob participates and competes in triathlons and running races. To date, he himself has competed in over 300 races, including 9 Ironman triathlons and 2 Ironman World Championships. In 2012, DeStefano married Alyssa Hulahan. The couple later divorced.
