= Thomas Hyde (disambiguation) =

Thomas Hyde (1636–1703) was an English Orientalist.

Thomas Hyde may also refer to:

- Thomas Hyde (Catholic exile) (1524–1597), English educator and Catholic exile
- Thomas W. Hyde (1841–1899), general in the American Civil War
- Thomas Hyde (composer) (dates unknown), classical music composer
- Tom Hyde (born 1945), American chiropractor
