= Tom Hyde =

American chiropractor

Thomas E. Hyde
- Born: 1945 (age 80–81); Thomasville, Georgia
- Education: Florida State University; Logan College of Chiropractic
- Occupation: Chiropractor

Thomas E. Hyde, (born 1945 in Thomasville, Georgia) is an American chiropractor, having received his Doctor of Chiropractic degree from Logan College of Chiropractic in 1977 and his Bachelor of Arts degree in biology from Florida State University in 1973. He is married to Susan Hyde and has one daughter.

Hyde served as Secretary-general of the International Federation of Sports Chiropractic, and was chosen by the newly established USOC chiropractic selection committee (composed of DC's) to provide chiropractic services at the Pan American Games held in Indianapolis, Indiana in 1987, He summited Mount Kilimanjaro, Mount Fuji and Aconcagua, and was the Expedition Leader for the 2003 Prostate Cancer Climb on Mount Kilimanjaro.

== Career ==
Hyde has lectured all over the world, and is considered an expert regarding chiropractic care of athletes. He served as president and executive director of the American Chiropractic Association (ACA) Sports Council for eight years. He served as the secretary general for the International Federation of Sports Chiropractic (FICS), and also served as the liaison between FICS and the World Olympians Association. He also served on the board of directors of the Miami-Dade Sports Commission, and the editorial board of the Journal of the Canadian Chiropractic Association (JCCA). He served a four-year term as a member of the Florida Olympics and Pan American Games Task Force.

- 1987 - Hyde was the 8th chiropractor to be accepted to the volunteer program for chiropractors at the United States Olympic Training Center, in Colorado Springs, Colorado, and was subsequently selected to serve as the official chiropractor for the 1987 Pan American Games, making him only the 3rd DC to do so.
- 1990 - Hyde was the State of Florida's coordinator for medical services for the Sunshine State Games.
- 1990-1997 - He served as the chiropractic consultant for the Miami Dolphins.
- Hyde served many years on the Governor's Council on Physical Fitness and Sports.
- 2004 - Hyde was a member of the commission, called "The Mercy Guidelines" which created the seminal, national professional guidelines for the practice of Chiropractic.

In 2001, Hyde was inducted to the Hall of Fame of the Sports Council of the American Chiropractic Association. In 2002, he was named "Sports Chiropractor of the Year" by the Florida Chiropractic Association Sports Injury Council. He was named "Person of the Year" by Dynamic Chiropractic in 2009.

== Bibliography ==
Hyde has written several peer-reviewed articles and books (listed below):

- Souza, Thomas A.; Hyde, Thomas E. (2004), Differential Diagnosis and Management for the Chiropractor: Protocols and (3rd ed.), Jones and Bartlett, ISBN 978-0-7637-3220-2.
- Hyde, T & Gengenbach, M., "Conservative Management of Sports Injuries", 1996, Williams and Wilkins. ISBN 0-683-03944-X.
- Hyde, T & Gengenbach, M., "Conservative Management of Sports Injuries", 2nd ed., 2006, (Jones and Bartlett) ISBN 0-7637-3252-4.
