= CCSP =

CCSP may refer to:

- Canadian Centre for Studies in Publishing, Simon Fraser University
- Certified Chiropractic Sports Physician
- Certified Cloud Security Professional, a (ISC)² certification
- Cisco Certified Security Professional, a Cisco certification
- Climate Change Science Program
- Club cell secretory protein
