= ICCSD =

ICCSD may refer to:

- International Chiropractic Sport Science Diploma
- Iowa City Community School District
- Izard County Consolidated School District
