= Sports chiropractic =

Medical specialty

Sports chiropractic is a specialty of chiropractic. It generally requires post-graduate coursework and a certification or diplomate status granted by a credentialing agency recognized in a practitioner's region.

Assessment and diagnosis of sports-related injuries by a sports chiropractor involves a physical exam and sometimes imaging studies. Treatment is described as non-invasive and can include joint manipulations and recommendations for exercises designed to improve strength, flexibility and range of motion. Sports Chiropractors specialize in the prevention and care of musculoskeletal injuries. The demand for sports teams to have a Sports Chiropractor is increasing. All 32 teams in the National Football League (NFL) offer chiropractic services. Additionally, 30 teams in Major League Baseball (MLB) utilize chiropractors.

== Training and credentialing ==
The International Federation of Sports Chiropractic (FICS) established the Internationally Certified Chiropractic Sports Practitioner (ICSSP) program in connection with Murdoch University, in Perth, Australia. Applicants can receive a certification through participation in a combination of online courses and seminars, and can receive credit for post-doctoral education programs. FICS coordinates with athletic associations to provide chiropractors for international sporting events.

In March 2019, the ICCSP program underwent a major revamp and today is known as the International Certificates in Sports Chiropractic (ICSC). There is also a diploma and a fellowship course developed at a higher level to this accreditation.

In Canada, a minimum two-year post-graduate program and certification as a chiropractic sports specialist (FRCCSS) are offered by the Royal College of Chiropractic Sports Sciences. The U.S. equivalent is the Certified Chiropractic Sports Physician (CCSP), or the Diplomate of the American Chiropractic Board of Sports Physicians (DACBSP), a three-year post-doctoral program.

== Use by amateur and professional athletes ==
Athletes normally subject their bodies to strenuous exercises that often cause muscle and body pains. These physically straining activities can create spinal alignment and movement problems. With sports chiropractic care, the athlete does not have to live with chronic pains anymore.

As of the 2014-2015 season, every NFL team had an official team chiropractor. In Major League Baseball, 30 teams have a team chiropractor. In 2006, a study analyzing Division I NCAA athletes at intercollegiate sporting events in Hawaii found that chiropractic usage within the last 12 months was reported by 39% of respondents.

Chiropractic sports medicine specialists first began treating Olympic athletes at the Olympic Games in Montreal in 1976, when Leroy Perry began working with the Aruban team. The first official appointment of a chiropractor to the US team was during the 1980 Winter Olympic Games in Lake Placid, New York, when Stephen J. Press recommended George Goodheart to the chairman of the US Olympic Committee (USOC)'s Division of Sports Medicine. Subsequently, a program was developed to screen chiropractors for the USOC in Colorado Springs, CO and chiropractors have been included with the US and other national teams since then. In 1996, Dr. Steven Horwitz, D.C. was selected by the USOC as the third chiropractor to part of the Medical Staff for the Games of the XXVI Olympiad in Atlanta. In 2000, Life University opened a 4500 sq. ft. chiropractic clinic in the Costa Rican Olympic Committee Compound to provide chiropractic services for athletes. The US team sent four chiropractors to Beijing for the 2008 Olympic games, where Mike Reed served the U.S. team as a treating chiropractor and also as the chiropractic medical director of the Performance Services Division of the USOC. Chiropractors were included on the US medical team again for the 2010 Vancouver Olympic Games, where Michael Reed acted as the external medical director for the USOC, and oversaw the USOC volunteer medical program and the USOC Sports Medicine Network. Chiropractic care was arranged by the British Chiropractic Association and integrated into the treatment of athletes for a polyclinic during the 2010 Winter Olympics in Vancouver. At the 2012 Summer Games in London, the USOC brought eight chiropractors in addition to the full-time paid medical director, William Moreau. The World Games 2022, doctors of chiropractic from eight countries represented the International Federation of Sports Chiropractic (FICS) from July 7–17, 2022 The World Games in Birmingham, Alabama. FICS chiropractors treated more than 3,400 athletes participating in 30+ unique sports.

== Associations ==
- International Federation of Sports Chiropractic or Fédération Internationale de Chiropratique du Sport (FICS)
- International Association of Olympic Chiropractic Officers
