= List of chiropractic credentials =

There are a number of degrees and credentials that are awarded to chiropractors, depending on the culture and regulations of different jurisdictions.

In the United States, where chiropractic education and practice is regulated, the degree of Doctor of Chiropractic (DC) is awarded to students who have completed a professional course in chiropractic.

In some countries, the practice of chiropractic is not regulated. Some chiropractors do not have degrees, including the founder of chiropractic, D. D. Palmer.

== Chiropractic degrees around the world ==
Degree	Full Name	Nation(s) in which it is awarded
B.App.Sc. (clin). & B.C.Sc.	Bachelor of Applied Science (Clinical Science) & Bachelor of Chiropractic Science	Japan
B.Sc. (chiro) & B.C.	Bachelor of Science (Chiropractic) & Bachelor of Chiropractic	Australia, Japan
B.App.Sc. (Compl) & M.Clin.Chiro.	Bachelor of Applied Science (Complementary Medicine) & Master of Clinical Chiropractic	Australia
B.Chiro.	Bachelor of Chiropractic	New Zealand
B.Chiro.Sc & M.Chiro	Bachelor of Chiropractic Science & Master of Chiropractic	Australia
B.Sc. (Hons) Chiro	Bachelor of Science (Hons) Chiropractic	Malaysia
B.Tech. (chiro) and M.Tech. (chiro)	Bachelor in Technology (Chiropractic) & Master in Technology (Chiropractic)	South Africa
D.C.	Doctor of Chiropractic	Brazil, Canada, France, Japan, Mexico, Spain, United States
D.C. and M.S. (Chiro)	Doctor of Chiropractic and Master of Science (Chiropractic)	South Korea
M.C. or M.Chiro.	Master of Chiropractic or Master in Chiropractic	Australia, United Kingdom
M Chiro Med and DCM	Master of Chiropractic Medicine and Doctor of Chiropractic Medicine	Switzerland
M.C.B.	Master in Clinical Biomechanics	Denmark
M.Tech. (chiro)	Master in Technology, Chiropractic	South Africa

== Post-professional education ==
Some chiropractic schools offer post-professional degrees in chiropractic specialisms, such as veterinary and rehabilitative chiropractic.

In the United States, it is possible to receive board certification in a chiropractic specialism. Board certified chiropractics receive a diploma in the specialism and are known as a diplomate or fellow.

=== Chiropractic specialist certifications ===
Degree	Full Name	Description
CAC	Certified in Animal (Veterinary) Chiropractic	Continuing education course, in this specialty, sponsored by the American Veterinary Chiropractic Association. The program consists of 100 post-doctoral hours, run through the continuing education programs of accredited Chiropractic colleges, and culminating in an examination.
CCEP	Certified Chiropractic Extremity Practitioner	American program, seven-weekend post-Doctoral course; provided by an accredited American Chiropractic college; followed by a Certifying examination.
CCRD	Certified Chiropractic Rehabilitation Doctor	Continuing education course, in this specialty, sponsored by the American Chiropractic Association Council of Chiropractic Physiological Therapeutics and Rehabilitation. The program consists of 100 post-doctoral hours, run through the continuing education programs of accredited Chiropractic colleges, and culminating in an examination.
CCSP	Certified Chiropractic Sports Physician	American program (but exported) 1 yr post-Doctoral; consisting of four weekend seminars provided by an accredited American Chiropractic college; followed by a nationally administered Certifying Examination administered by the American Chiropractic Board of Sports Physicians.
CCST	Chiropractic Certification in Spinal Trauma	International Chiropractor's Association Council on Applied Chiropractic Sciences affiliated program. The program consists of ten weekend sessions taught through the continuing education department of an accredited Chiropractic College and culminating in a qualifying examination.
ICSC	Internationally Certified Sports Chiropractor	A program offered by the International Federation of Sports Chiropractic (FICS), of week-end seminars, run through an accredited Chiropractic college, and followed by a FICS certification examination.
PSP	Primary Spine Practitioner	A certifying program offered by the University of Pittsburgh, consisting of approximately 120 hours of seminars and 60 hours online education modules, followed by an in-person certification examination. The program is designed to train physical therapists and chiropractors to be the first-contact provider for patients with spine-related disorders.

=== Board certifications ===
Degree	Full Name	Description
DABCA	Diplomate of the American Chiropractic Board of Acupuncture	American program, 3 yr post-doctoral; consisting of 36 week-end seminars provided through an accredited American Chiropractic college; followed by a nationally-administered board certifying examination. This Board is affiliated with the American Chiropractic Association.
DACBR	Diplomate of the American Chiropractic Board of Radiology	American program, 3 yr post-Doctoral; consisting of a 3-year in-house post-doctoral residency program at an accredited American Chiropractic college; followed by a nationally administered 2-part (written and oral) board certifying examination. This Board is affiliated with the American Chiropractic Association.
DACAN or DACNB or DIACN or DABCN	Diplomate of the American Chiropractic Board of Neurology or Diplomate of the International Board of Chiropractic Neurology	American program, 3 yr post-Doctoral; consisting of 36 week-end seminars provided through an accredited American chiropractic college; followed by a nationally administered board certifying examination. This Board is affiliated with the American Chiropractic Association.
DABCI	Diplomate of the American Chiropractic Board of Diagnosis and Internal Disorders	American program, 3 yr post-Doctoral; consisting of 36 week-end seminars provided through an accredited American Chiropractic college; followed by a nationally administered board certifying examination. This Board is affiliated with the American Chiropractic Association.
DABCO , DACO and FACO	Diplomate (or Fellow) of the Academy of Chiropractic Orthopedists (ACO)	This is a 3-year postdoctoral American program consisting of 36 weekend seminars provided through an accredited American Chiropractic college and is affiliated with the American Chiropractic Association. Having completed the required coursework, individuals become board eligible for a nationally administered board certifying examination. Individuals having completed the postdoctoral program and along with passing the ACO board examination are entitled to the designation of Diplomate of the Academy of Chiropractic Orthopedists (DACO). Individuals who have achieved Diplomate status with the ABCO or the ACO and are also current members of the ACO are entitled to the status of Fellow of the Academy of Chiropractic Orthopedists (FACO).
DIANM and FIANM	Diplomate (or Fellow) of the International Academy of Neuromusculoskeletal Medicine	This is a 3-year advanced postdoctoral program undertaken through the University of Bridgeport in Connecticut (USA). This includes a 3-year, full-time neuromusculoskeletal medicine residency. Individuals who have achieved Diplomate status with the IANM and are also current members of the IANM are entitled to the status of Fellow of the International Academy of Neuromusculoskeletal Medicine (FIANM).
DACRB	Diplomate of the American Chiropractic Board of Rehabilitation	American program, 3 yr post-Doctoral; consisting of 3 years full-term residency program provided through an accredited American Chiropractic college; followed by a nationally administered board certifying examination. This Board is affiliated with the American Chiropractic Association.
DACBSP	Diplomate of the American Chiropractic Board of Sports Physicians	American program, 3 yr post-Doctoral; consisting of 36 weekend seminars provided through an accredited American Chiropractic college; a practical experience component and followed by a nationally administered board certifying examination.
DCCJP and FCCJP	Diplomate in Chiropractic Craniocervical Junction Procedures	This is a 3-year, 300-hour, post-graduate American program. The Board responsible for developing the curriculum and credentialing is affiliated with the International Chiropractic Association. Fellowship is awarded by the council's board of directors, to those Diplomates that have met eligibility criteria.
FCCR (C)	Fellow, College of Chiropractic Radiology (Canada)	This is a three-year post-doctoral program operated by the Canadian College of Chiropractic Radiology, in association with an accredited Chiropractic College, culminating in a board examination administered by the college.
FRCCSS(C)	Fellow, Royal College of Chiropractic Sports Sciences(Canada)	Successful Fellows earn the right to practice as chiropractic sports specialists.
DICCP and FICCP	Diplomate and Fellow, International College of Chiropractic Pediatrics	American program, run through the International Chiropractor's Association, Council on Chiropractic Pediatrics. It consists of three years of week-end seminars provided through an accredited Chiropractic College (currently New York Chiropractic College, Palmer College of Chiropractic and the New Zealand College of Chiropractic all sponsor this program); and followed by a board certifying examination. Fellowship is awarded by the council's board of directors, to those Diplomates having made significant contributions to the field, and is an honorary title.
CACCP and DACCP	Certified and Diplomate, Academy of Chiropractic Family Practice	American program, run through the International Chiropractic Pediatric Association. It consists of 200 hours of week-end seminars for Certification and 400 hours of in-office projects for the Diplomate provided through an accredited Chiropractic College; as well as participation in Practice Based Research projects; and followed by a board certifying examination. The entire Diplomate Program is co-sponsored by Cleveland Chiropractic Colleges. Additional post graduate sponsors of the Certification Program include: Northwestern Health Sciences University, Life University, and Parker Chiropractic College. Previously the ICPA issued credentials of FICPA with similar requirements to the current CACCP and DACCP programs.
DGCSS and FGCSS	Diplomate and Fellow, Gonstead Clinical Studies Society	This credential is bestowed upon Doctors of Chiropractic by the Board who have taken a minimum of 238 post-doctoral seminar hours in the Gonstead technique; have been in practice for a minimum of 3 years for Diplomate and 10 years for Fellow; and have passed written and practical examinations. The Fellow credential also carries a requirement of participation in GCSS sponsored research or other research specific to the Gonstead technique. This board recognizes educational hours from seminars run by both non-profit and for-profit groups recognized as authorities in the Gonstead technique and certified by accredited Chiropractic Colleges.

== Honorary titles ==
Degree	Full Name	Description
FICC	Fellow, International College of Chiropractors	This honorary degree is bestowed upon Doctors of Chiropractic by a body generally allied with the American Chiropractic Association.
FACC	Fellow, American College of Chiropractors	This honorary degree is bestowed upon Doctors of Chiropractic by a New York based, body generally allied with the American Chiropractic Association and the New York Chiropractic College.
FRCC	Fellow, Royal College of Chiropractors	This honorary degree is bestowed upon Doctors of Chiropractic by United Kingdom-based Royal College of Chiropractors. Must have at least 5 years postgraduate experience and successfully complete a relevant, university-validated postgraduate Masters or Doctoral programme.
FICA	Fellow, International Chiropractors Association	This honorary degree is bestowed periodically by the "Distinguished Fellows" of the International Chiropractor's Association upon those deemed worthy.
PhC	Doctor of Chiropractic Philosophy	This was an honorary degree awarded to doctors of chiropractic by chiropractic colleges, especially by Palmer College of Chiropractic. The requirements for this honorary degree transitioned from its inception in 1908 until it demise in 1968, and included: high chiropractic academic achievement, postgraduate chiropractic philosophic coursework, or writing a 15,000 word essay regarding chiropractic philosophy. During the 1960s the Ph.C. was awarded indiscriminately and requirements for achievement were not maintained. In 1968 the Council on Chiropractic Education officially denounced recognition of this award and opposed its use.

== Unrecognised certifications ==
These credentials are generally recognized only by the bodies which grant them.

Degree	Full Name	Description
BCAO	Board Certified, Atlas Orthogonist	This degree is bestowed upon Doctors of Chiropractic by a family-run corporation.
FASBE	Fellow Academy of Spinal Bio-Engineering	This degree is bestowed upon Doctors of Chiropractic by an unaccredited corporation.
DABCC	Diplomate of the American Board of Chiropractic Consultants	This specialty diploma is bestowed upon Doctors of Chiropractic by an unaccredited organization.
ABDA and FABDA	American Board of Disability Examiners, and "Fellow" of the ABDA.	This degree is bestowed upon Doctors of Chiropractic by an unaccredited organization.
FAFICC	Fellow, Academy of Forensic and Industrial Chiropractic Consultants	This degree is bestowed upon Doctors of Chiropractic by an unaccredited organization.
FNAMUAP	Fellow, National Academy of Manipulation Under Anesthesia Physicians	This degree is bestowed upon Doctors of Chiropractic by an unaccredited organisation.
