= Confirmed (album) =

Studio album by Dame D.O.L.L.A.
- Released: October 6, 2017
- Recorded: 2016–2017
- Genre: Hip hop
- Length: 44:05

Dame D.O.L.L.A. chronology
| The Letter O (2016) | Confirmed (2017) | Big D.O.L.L.A. (2019) |

Confirmed is the second studio album by professional basketball player Damian Lillard, under the moniker Dame D.O.L.L.A., which stands for Different on Levels the Lord Allows. The album charted on number 72 of the Top Album Charts as well as on number 18 of the indie charts.

== Track listing ==
| No. | Title | Writer(s) | Producer(s) | Length |
|---|---|---|---|---|
| 1. | "No Punches" | Damian Lillard | Like | 2:42 |
| 2. | "Boss Life" | Lillard | Fabe | 3:37 |
| 3. | "Switch Sides" (featuring Verse Simmonds and Brookfield Duece) | Lillard | Scott Storch | 3:42 |
| 4. | "Run It Up" (featuring Lil Wayne) | Lillard; Dwayne Carter | Scott Storch | 4:00 |
| 5. | "Shoota" (featuring Expensive Melodies) | Lillard | Expensive Melodies | 2:42 |
| 6. | "Anomaly" (featuring 2 Chainz) | Lillard; Tauheed Epps | John Sk McGee | 4:06 |
| 7. | "Marshawn Lynch" (featuring Danny from Sobrante) | Lillard | Husss | 2:48 |
| 8. | "Trap Party (Funeral)" | Lillard | Husss | 4:33 |
| 9. | "5th of Henn" (featuring Danny from Sobrante) | Lillard | Ben Billions | 2:36 |
| 10. | "One & Only" | Lillard | Fabe | 3:23 |
| 11. | "The Let Down" (featuring Nick Grant and BJ the Chicago Kid) | Lillard | Flippa | 4:47 |
| 12. | "Members Only" (featuring Allstar Bozzle) | Lillard | D.Woo | 3:09 |
| 13. | "Wonderland" | Lillard | BP The Producer | 1:53 |
| Total length: | | | | 44:05 |
