= The Letter O =

Studio album by Dame D.O.L.L.A.
- Released: October 21, 2016
- Recorded: 2015–2016
- Genre: Hip hop
- Length: 48:00
- Label: Front Page
- Producers: John $k McGee; BP The Producer; Like; Cardiak; Swiff D; SK; Cali Got Tha Juice; Raphael Saadiq

Dame D.O.L.L.A. chronology
The Letter O (2016)	Confirmed (2017)

The Letter O is the debut studio album by professional basketball player Damian Lillard, under the moniker Dame D.O.L.L.A., which stands for Different On Levels the Lord Allows. The album peaked at number 119 on the Billboard 200, number 13 on the Independent Albums chart, and number seven on the R&B/Hip-Hop Album chart.

== Track listing ==
No.	Title	Writer(s)	Producer(s)	Length
1.	"Bill Walton"	Damian Lillard	John $k McGee	3:22
2.	"Wasatch Front"	Lillard	BP The Producer	4:25
3.	"Growth Spurt" (featuring Dupre')	Lillard	BP The Producer	3:16
4.	"Misguided"	Lillard	Like	3:02
5.	"Thank You" (featuring Marsha Ambrosius, Brookfield Duece, and Danny from Sobrante)	Lillard	Cardiak	5:16
6.	"Plans" (featuring Jamie Foxx)	Lillard	BP The Producer	4:19
7.	"Legacy" (featuring Juvenile and Danny from Sobrante)	Lillard		3:56
8.	"Loyal to the Soil" (featuring Lil Wayne)	Lillard; Dwayne Carter	Swiff D	4:00
9.	"Roll Call" (featuring Brooksfield Duece)	Lillard	SK	3:49
10.	"Pillow Talk" (featuring Manny Lotus)	Lillard	John $k McGee; Cali Got Tha Juice	4:16
11.	"Baggage" (featuring Adrian Marcel)	Lillard		4:55
12.	"Hero" (Bonus track) (featuring Raphael Saadiq)	Raphael Saadiq	Cardiak	3:46
Total length:				48:22

Notes

- Initially when Damian Lillard released The Letter O, Cash Money Records had a problem with Lil Wayne being on "Loyal to the Soil," but it was eventually resolved after a short legal dispute.

== Charts ==
Chart (2016)	Peak position
US Billboard 200	119

== Personnel ==
- Derrick "Lottery" Hardy - A&R
- Mike Bozzi - Mastering
- Christopher Henry - Engineer, Mixing Engineer
- Scott Desmarais - Engineer
- Tim O'Sullivan - Assistant Engineer
