= Magic Johnson Award =

National Basketball Association award

The Magic Johnson Award is an annual award for a National Basketball Association (NBA) player who recognizes excellence on the court and cooperation and dignity with the media and public.

The award, which was created in 2001 by the Pro Basketball Writers Association, has been given to some of the league's most prominent players over the years. It is named in honor of player Magic Johnson, whom the writers association regards as "the ideal model" for this award.

Ray Allen was the inaugural recipient of the award. Shane Battier, Damian Lillard, Stephen Curry, and Kevin Durant are the only players to win the award multiple times. The most recent winner of the award is Victor Wembanyama, in 2026.

== Winners ==
Year	Player	Team	Ref(s)
2001	Ray Allen	Milwaukee Bucks	
2002	Elton Brand	Los Angeles Clippers	
2003	Jalen Rose	Chicago Bulls	
2004	Jermaine O'Neal	Indiana Pacers	
2005	Antawn Jamison	Washington Wizards	
2006	Grant Hill	Orlando Magic	
2007	Shane Battier	Houston Rockets	
2008	Derek Fisher	Los Angeles Lakers	
2009	Brandon Roy	Portland Trail Blazers	
2010	Chris Bosh	Toronto Raptors	
2011	Kevin Durant	Oklahoma City Thunder	
2012	Steve Nash	Phoenix Suns	
2013	Shane Battier (2)	Miami Heat	
2014	Dirk Nowitzki	Dallas Mavericks	
2015	Pau Gasol	Chicago Bulls	
2016	Stephen Curry	Golden State Warriors	
2017	Damian Lillard	Portland Trail Blazers	
2018	DeMar DeRozan	Toronto Raptors	
2019	Dwyane Wade	Miami Heat	
2020	Damian Lillard (2)	Portland Trail Blazers	
2021	Not awarded due to the COVID-19 pandemic		
2022	Not awarded due to the COVID-19 pandemic		
2023	Giannis Antetokounmpo	Milwaukee Bucks	
2024	Stephen Curry (2)	Golden State Warriors	
2025	Kevin Durant (2)	Phoenix Suns	
2026	Victor Wembanyama	San Antonio Spurs	

== Multiple-time winners ==
Awards	Player	Team(s)	Years
2	Shane Battier	Houston Rockets (1) / Miami Heat (1)	2007, 2013
2	Stephen Curry	Golden State Warriors	2016, 2024
2	Kevin Durant	Oklahoma City Thunder (1) / Phoenix Suns (1)	2011, 2025
2	Damian Lillard	Portland Trail Blazers	2017, 2020
