= Big D.O.L.L.A. =

Studio album by Dame D.O.L.L.A.
- Released: August 9, 2019
- Recorded: 2018–2019
- Genre: Hip hop
- Length: 44:05

Dame D.O.L.L.A. chronology
Confirmed (2017)	Big D.O.L.L.A. (2019)	Different On Levels The Lord Allowed (2021)

Big D.O.L.L.A. is the third studio album by professional basketball player Damian Lillard, released under his Dame D.O.L.L.A. moniker. Unlike his previous albums, he released a regular as well as a deluxe version. The album charted on number 68 of the Top Album Charts as well as on number 12 of the indie charts.

== Track listing ==
No.	Title	Writer(s)	Producer(s)	Length
1.	"Sorry" (featuring Lil Wayne)	Damian Lillard; Dwayne Carter; John McGee	Nonstop Da Hitman; John $k McGee; Cali Got Tha Juice	2:47
2.	"Check"	Lillard; Eduardo Earle; Jeffrey LaCroix; Keanu Torres	Fuse 808; Tre Pounds; Keanu Beats; Nagra	2:40
3.	"Bestie" (featuring Marley Waters)	Lillard; Brendon Waters	Omar Grand; Yonatan Watts	3:02
4.	"Baggage Claim" (featuring Mozzy)	Lillard; Timothy Patterson; Gary Fountaine; Joshua Parker; Michael Hernandez	Nonstop Da Hitman; OG Parker; Foreign Teck	2:56
5.	"Dre Grant" (featuring Brookefield Duece)	Lillard; Frank Miller II; Fountaine	D.Woo; Nonstop Da Hitman	3:04
6.	"Cupid"	Lillard; Earle; Torres; Fabio Aguillar	Fuse 808; Keanu Beats; Fabio Aguillar	2:26
7.	"Ricky Bobby"	Lillard; Fountaine; Tim Gomringer; Kevin Gomringer	Nonstop Da Hitman; Cubeatz; Nils	3:05
8.	"Money Ball" (featuring Jeremih, Derrick Milano, and Danny from Sobrante)	Lillard; Jeremy Felton; Derrick Gray; Torres; Anthony Clemons; Fountaine	Keanu Beats; Fabio Aguillar	3:37
9.	"Beach" (featuring Derrick Milano)	Lillard; Gray; Juan Guerrieri-Maril; Fountaine; Eugene Karavasilidis	Z3N; Nonstop Da Hitman	3:32
10.	"Track Meet" (featuring Major Myjah)	Lillard; Myjah Veira; Aliandro Prawl; Scott Carter	Triangle Park Music	2:26
Total length:				44:05

Deluxe edition
No.	Title	Writer(s)	Producer(s)	Length
11.	"I Rest My Case"	Lillard		3:15
12.	"You Feel Me" (featuring Mozzy)	Lillard; Patterson; Earle; Jack Gibson; Dorien Theus	Fuse 808; Gibbo; DT	3:16
13.	"Sorry (Remix)" (featuring Lil Wayne and Jadakiss)	Lillard; Carter; Jason Phillips	John $k McGee; Cali Got Tha Juice	3:20
14.	"Check (Remix)" (featuring G-Eazy and Sada Baby)	Lillard; Gerald Gillum; Casada Sorrell	Fuse 808; Tre Pounds; Keanu Beats; Nagra	3:20
15.	"Bestie (Remix)" (featuring Lil Durk and Marley Waters)	Lillard; Brendon Waters; Durk Banks	Omar Grand; Yonatan Watts	3:41
16.	"Baggage Claim (Remix)" (featuring Mozzy and Benny the Butcher)	Lillard; Patterson; Jeremie Pennick	Nonstop Da Hitman; OG Parker	2:20
Total length:				63:17
