= International Council of Sport Science and Physical Education =

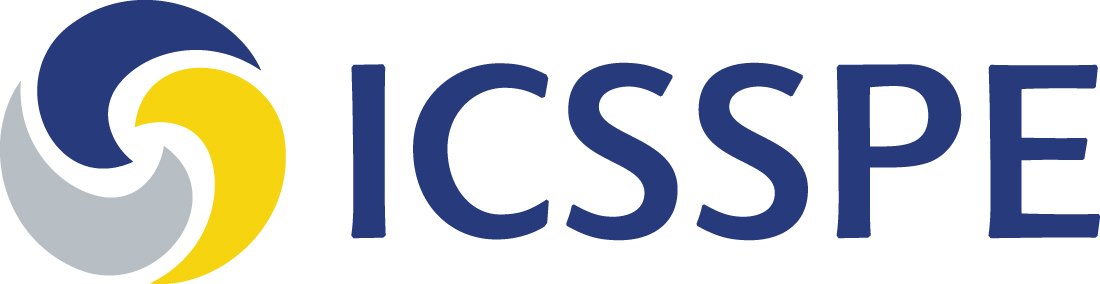
- Abbreviation: ICSSPE/CIEPSS
- Formation: 1958; 68 years ago
- Headquarters: Berlin, Germany
- President: Prof. Annette R. Hofmann
- Website: www.icsspe.org

The International Council of Sport Science and Physical Education (international abbreviations: ICSSPE - International Council of Sport Science and Physical Education; CIEPSS - Conseil International pour l'Education Physique et la Science du Sport) is an international umbrella organisation for sport, sport science, and physical education. The legal seat and the headquarters are both based in Berlin, Germany.

The mission of ICSSPE is to:

– Integrate research to enhance physical activity and sport;

– Educate for improved quality of life and health for all people through physical activity and sport;

– Promote policies for active lifestyles, human performance and good governance in physical activity and sport.

ICSSPE membership is composed of:

– Governmental sport, health and education authorities;

– Non-governmental sport organisations;

– Scientific and educational organisations and institutions.

== Development ==
The first international sports science associations already existed before World War I. In the early days, it was mainly sports physicians who contributed to the science of sport. In 1956, Fritz Duras organised a scientific congress on the occasion of the Summer Olympics, which attracted 350 participants from all continents. They decided to found a world association of sports science and commissioned Duras to prepare it. The Council was then founded in Paris in 1958 with the support of UNESCO.The German-Australian sports physician of Jewish origin Duras, who had to emigrate to Australia in 1937, thus became the founding president. Since then, the organisation had been registered with UNESCO before the legal seat was moved to Berlin in 2009. Well-known sport officials and scientists subsequently served as presidents, such as Nobel Peace Prize winner Philip Noel-Baker, the former world-class athlete Sir Roger Bannister and the Director of the Federal Institute of Sports Science, Germany, Dr August Kirsch. The current President is Dr Uri Schaefer; Professor Dr Gudrun Doll-Tepper is Honorary President. At present, 171 organisations and institutions from more than 60 countries are members of ICSSPE.

== Structure ==
The highest body of ICSSPE is the General Assembly, which is held every two years. The Executive Board, elected by the General Assembly, serves for a period of four years. It consists of a President, three Vice-Presidents, a Treasurer and six further members. The office is located in Germany (Friesenhaus I, Hans-Braun-Straße 14053 Berlin). Patrick Stolpmann has been the managing director since 2023

== Presidents ==
- 1958–1960 Fritz Duras (Australia)
- 1960–1976 Sir Philip Noel-Baker (United Kingdom)
- 1976–1983 Sir Roger Bannister (United Kingdom)
- 1983–1990 August Kirsch (Federal Republic of Germany)
- 1990–1996 Paavo V. Komi (Finland)
- 1997–2008 Gudrun Doll-Tepper (Federal Republic of Germany)
- 2009–2014 Margaret Talbot (United Kingdom)
- 2014–2025 Uri Schaefer (Israel)
- Since 2025 Annette R. Hofmann (Germany)

ICSSPE conducts its activities in the domains of Science, Education and Policy. It promotes interdisciplinary research and participates regularly in a number of projects. The organisation contributes to education of professionals in sport science, physical education and physical activity and supports governmental authorities and non-governmental sport organisations in the development of effective and sustainable policies. ICSSPE cooperates with a number of national, international and supranational organisations.

== Sources ==
- Bailey, Steve. Science in the Service of Physical Education and Sport: The Story of the International Council of Sport Science and Physical Education 1956 - 1996. John Wiley and Sons. ISBN 0-471-96924-9.
- "Doll-Tepper Re-elected ICSSPE President". Paralympic.org. 9 August 2004. Archived from the original on 30 September 2007.
