= Thomas Hyde (Catholic exile) =

Thomas Hyde (1524–1597), was an English Roman Catholic academic, teacher, priest and exile.

== Life ==
Hyde was born at Newbury, Berkshire and was related to the family of Edward Hyde, 1st Earl of Clarendon. He became at the age of 13 (1537) a scholar of Winchester College, and went on to New College, Oxford, where he was elected fellow in 1543, and graduated B.A. in October 1545 and M.A. in 1549. He resigned his fellowship at New College in 1550, and in 1551 succeeded William Everard as headmaster of Winchester. He was installed a prebendary of Winchester on 23 June 1556.

A fervent Catholic, Hyde was forced to resign his offices after Elizabeth I's accession, and was ordered to the custody of the lord treasurer by the ecclesiastical commissioners in 1561. He then went abroad, and lived for some years at Leuven; William Allen commended his counsel and abilities in a letter dated 1579. He later moved to Douai, where he boarded with a printer's widow. He died there on 9 May 1597, and was buried in the lady chapel of St. James's Church.

== Works ==
Hyde's major work was A Consolatorie Epistle to the Afflicted Catholikes. Being a Dissuasive against frequenting Protestant Churches, and an Exhortation to Suffer with Patience. Set foorth by Thomas Hide, Priest, Louvain, 1579; 2nd edition, with three woodcuts, 1580.
