= Internationally Certified Chiropractic Sports Practitioner =

The Internationally Certified Chiropractic Sport Science Practitioner (ICCSP) (or alternatively "physician" in those jurisdictions which allow the term), is a post-doctoral professional certification, granted by the International Federation of Sports Chiropractic (FICS), through an association with Murdoch University. It was previously referred to as the "International Chiropractic Sports Science Diploma" up until 2013.).

The ICCSP is the "minimum qualification required to be part of a FICS chiropractic delegation for a national or international event such as the Olympic and World Games."

== Programs ==
The Program is run via several week-end seminars, taught by faculty at accredited Chiropractic Colleges, and other locations around the world. A Doctor of Chiropractic can also obtain the credential by submitting national post-doctoral sports Chiropractic credentials, a current CPR certification, and other qualifications to the FICS Education Commission for evaluation.

== Applications ==
It is considered a pre-requisite to the Post-Graduate Diploma in Sports Chiropractic program at Murdoch University, in Perth, Australia. The ICCSP is recognized by the profession in many countries around the World.
