= Logan University =

Chiropractice college in Chesterfield, Missouri, US

- Former names: Logan College of Chiropractic; Logan Basic College of Chiropractic
- Motto: Leaders Made
- Type: Private university
- Established: 1935
- Endowment: $26,464,358 (2014)
- President: Garrett Thompson
- Academic staff: 84
- Administrative staff: 76
- Students: 1380
- Undergraduates: 111
- Postgraduates: 552
- Doctoral students: 717
- Location: Chesterfield, Missouri, U.S. 38.6316°N 90.5418°W
- Campus: 112 acres (45.3 ha)
- Colors: Blue & white
- Mascot: Leopard
- Website: www.logan.edu

Logan University is a private university focused on chiropractic and the health sciences and located in Chesterfield, Missouri, United States.

== History ==
The college was named after founder and first president Hugh B. Logan, D.C. The first class of seven men and women enrolled on September 1, 1935. The college was housed in a converted residence in St. Louis' Central West End area at 4490 Lindell Blvd. After five more students joined in February 1936, the college moved to a 17-acre (6.88 ha) estate in Normandy, Missouri, a suburb of St. Louis, Missouri, that November.

In 1958, Carver College of Chiropractic (founded in 1906) of Oklahoma City merged with Logan Basic College of Chiropractic. In 1964, Missouri Chiropractic College also merged with Logan Basic College of Chiropractic; the name then changed to Logan College of Chiropractic.

In 1972, Logan acquired the buildings and grounds of the former Maryknoll Seminary in Chesterfield, Missouri. Additional buildings have since been constructed: the Health Center in 1982; the Science and Research Center in 1986; the Sports/Wellness Complex in 2000; the William D. Purser Center in 2007; and the Standard Process Student Center in 2008. Additionally, the former Maryknoll chapel was renovated and transformed into the Learning Resource Center in 2003; the Biofreeze Sports & Rehabilitation Center was added to the Health Center in 2006; and the university opened a new Educational Wing with an assessment center in 2012. The campus is on a 112-acre (45.3 ha) wooded hilltop and was included in MSNBC's 2007 list of "America's Most Beautiful College Campuses".

The institution changed its name to Logan University in 2013–14.

=== Leadership ===
Presidents of the institution have included:

- Hugh B. Logan, 1936–1944
- Vinton F. Logan, 1944–1961
- William Coggins, 1961–1979
- Milton T. Morter, Jr., 1979–1980
- Beatrice B. Hagen, 1980–1992
- George A. Goodman, 1992–2013
- J. Clay McDonald, 2013–2025
- Garrett Thompson, 2025–present

== Academics ==
The university is classified as a Special Focus Institution by the Carnegie Classification of Institutions of Higher Education.

Logan University’s primary academic offering is the Doctor of Chiropractic (D.C.) degree, complemented by the Doctor of Education (Ed.D.) in Health Professions Education. The university also offers master's programs and one baccalaureate degree in Human Biology. The university also offers a Chiro-Direct pathway within Logan's Bachelor of Science in Human Biology (BSHB) program, where students complete three years of the bachelor's degree and then begin the first year of the Doctor of Chiropractic program while finishing their final year in the bachelor's program. Logan also has agreements with colleges and universities that allow students from those schools to enter Logan's Doctor of Chiropractic program after completion of three years study and to be awarded their baccalaureate degrees from the partner schools after successful completion of their first year at Logan.

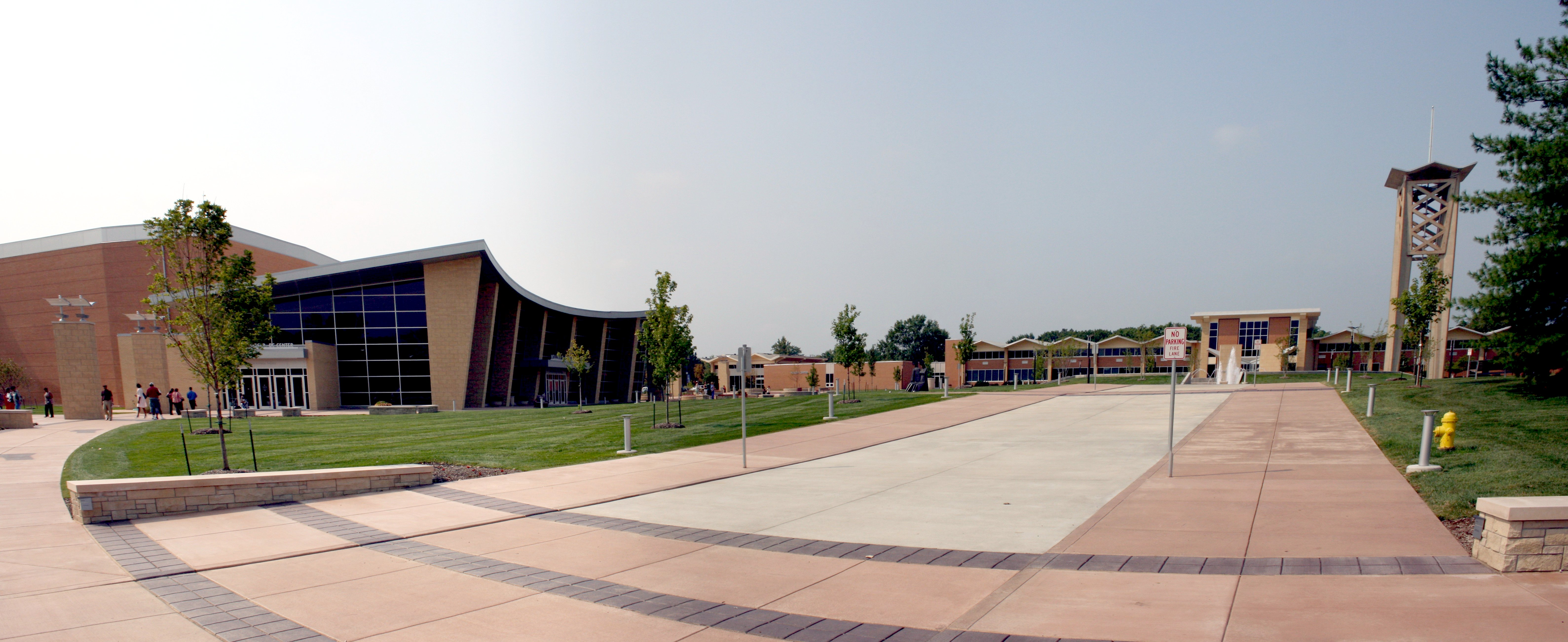
Logan University campus

Logan University confers degrees from its two schools: the Logan College of Chiropractic and the Logan College of Health Sciences.

The chiropractic program is accredited by the Council on Chiropractic Education (C.C.E.) and has had full accreditation since 1978. The Higher Learning Commission has accredited Logan for the awarding of baccalaureate, master's, and doctoral degrees since 1987.

== Student life ==
=== Student body ===
The student body at Logan consists of only 8% undergraduates, with doctoral students making up nearly 51% of enrollment. 56.5% of the students are male and 43.5% female. The overwhelming majority of the students are from around the United States, while there are only about a dozen international students.

=== Student clubs and activities ===
Logan hosts about 30 student organizations, Greek organizations, and sports clubs. Students are encouraged to take advantage of the campus recreational facilities, including the disc golf course; 1/4 mile running track; basketball, tennis, and sand volleyball courts; and the weights and workout equipment inside the Sports/Wellness Center.

The Greek community has four organizations, of which only one (Pi Kappa Chi) has chapters elsewhere.

=== Athletics and sports ===
While Logan previously fielded intercollegiate athletic teams, it has not done so since 2010–11. In 2015, there were club teams in men's basketball, soccer, softball, and ice hockey, as well as women's basketball and co-ed soccer and softball.

=== Student government ===
The nine-member Logan Student Government represents the student body on student concerns, governs the actions of recognized student organizations, adopts the Student Code of Conduct, sponsors student events, and governs the financing of student organizations.
