= Primary spine practitioner =

Occupation
- Names: PSP, Spine Care Clinician, or Spine Care Specialist
- Occupation type: Health care professional

Primary spine practitioners (also referred to as PSP, Spine Care Clinician, or Spine Care Specialist, or in the broader context a primary musculoskeletal specialist or provider) are health care professionals who are specially trained to provide primary care for patients with spinal disease.

A PSP has the training necessary to provide differential diagnosis, rule out serious pathology (such as infection, fracture, cancer, inflammatory joint disease) and give evidence-based management for many patients with spinal diseases. Evidence-based treatment methods include spinal manipulation and manual therapy, rehabilitative exercises, patient education, motivational techniques and the application of psychological principles, particularly those of cognitive-behavioral therapy and acceptance and commitment therapy.

PSPs recognize patients who require special tests (radiography, MRI, laboratory workup) and invasive procedures (injections, surgery), and to serve as the center of care for the purpose of providing counseling for the patient, coordination of care, and long term follow up.

An important aspect of this role is educating the patient on the risks, benefits and research evidence of all treatments for spinal pain so that, through a shared decision-making process, appropriate choices can be made as to what is the best treatment for the patient. In addition, the PSP is tasked with helping the patient navigate social systems, particularly for patients whose spinal disease arose from a work-related incident or personal injury.

== History ==
The concept of a spine care clinician or practitioner was first presented by neurologist Scott Haldeman in an editorial in The Spine Journal in 2001. The PSP role may include all clinical specialties that treat patients with spinal disease. This was emphasized at the American Back Society Annual Convention in San Francisco in November 2005.

At that time none of the current clinical disciplines offering care to people with spinal disorders were adequately trained in the skills necessary to offer treatment protocols consistent with current evidence-based guidelines. The necessity to define a primary spine care clinician or specialist became even more evident when it was determined that there were over 200 treatment approaches available for people with spinal pain but a lack of clinicians with the knowledge, and ability to guide patients through these treatment options.

Similar considerations were presented in the British Medical Journal by Harvigsen et al. which noted that the general medical practitioner is not adequately equipped to deal with the complexities of musculoskeletal disorders and suggested that the solution to this problem would be the development of a primary musculoskeletal specialist. Hartvigsen et al. argued that, with appropriate changes to education, clinical practice, and professional regulation, chiropractors, physical therapists, and osteopathic physicians could play an expanded role in delivering evidence-based musculoskeletal care.

This has not gone unrecognized by these professions with a series of articles now appearing in chiropractic and physical therapy journals Following Hartvigsen et al.'s proposal, several articles published in chiropractic and physical therapy journals argued that these professions could assume an expanded role in primary spine care, provided that education, clinical training, and standards of practice were further developed.
