= American Chiropractic Board of Sports Physicians =

US certification organization

- Abbreviation: ACBSP
- Formation: 1980; 46 years ago
- Type: NGO
- Legal status: 501c3 non-profit
- Purpose: Educational/regulatory
- Headquarters: Esterville, IA
- Services: Specialty Board certification
- Members: Chiropractic Physicians
- President: Robert Nelson, DC, DACBSP®
- Main organ: board of directors
- Website: Official site

The American Chiropractic Board of Sports Physicians, founded in 1980, is a chiropractic agency that certifies chiropractors practicing in the field of sports medicine as who have completed a certification program (Certified Chiropractic Sports Physician) or a post-doctoral degree program (Diplomate of the American Chiropractic Board of Sports Physicians).

== Credentialling of the Board ==
On October 31, 2006, the National Commission for Certifying Agencies (NCCA) granted accreditation to the American Chiropractic Board of Sports Physicians for demonstrating compliance with the NCCA Standards for the Accreditation of Certification Programs. NCCA is the accrediting body of the National Organization for Competency Assurance (NOCA). The NCCA Standards were created in 1977 and updated in 2003 to ensure certification programs adhere to modern standards of practice for the certification industry. The ACBSP joins an elite group of 78 organizations with 190 programs that have received and maintained NCCA accreditation.

== Boards given ==
=== CCSP ===
The Certified Chiropractic Sports Physician or CCSP, certification, is a one post graduate year course, taken at centers around the country, in week-end programs, and consists of 12 week-end classes and a Board exam. This course was first given in New Jersey, by National College of Chiropractic in 1980, and was then called Certified Team Physician, or CTP. The name was later changed to Certified Chiropractic Team Physician, or CCTP, and finally to its present designation of Certified Chiropractic Sports Physician

=== DACBSP ===
The Diplomate level course requires 3 years of such classes and a more comprehensive exam. recipients receive the DACBSP degree, Diplomate of the American Chiropractic Board of Sports Physicians.
