= International Federation of Sports Chiropractic =

International sports organization

International Federation of Sports Chiropractic (FICS)
- Abbreviation: FICS
- Formation: 1987
- Legal status: Current
- Purpose: To empower athletes so they can achieve their optimal performance naturally.
- Headquarters: MSI Maison du Sport International Avenue de Rhodanie 54, CH-1007
- Location: Lausanne, Switzerland
- Region served: Worldwide
- Members: 26 National Councils of Sports Chiropractors Worldwide
- Official language: English
- President: Martin Isaksson
- Website: www.fics.sport

The International Federation of Sports Chiropractic (French: Federation Internationale de Chiropratique du Sport or FICS) is an international organization that promotes sports chiropractic around the world. It is composed of national sports chiropractic councils, or national associations, from many countries such as Australia, Canada, Chile, Japan, Mexico, Spain, Turkey, United States, and the United Kingdom.

== History ==
FICS was formed in 1987, and has its headquarters in the Maison du Sport Internationale in Lausanne, Switzerland. It also maintains an administrative office in Canberra, Australia.

== Credentials granted ==
The International Certificate in Sports Chiropractic (ICSC) offers an International Certificate in Sports Chiropractic (ICSC), a post-graduate professional qualification in sports chiropractic. Depending on the laws of the jurisdiction in which the Doctor practices, (ICSC) may be a requirement for a chiropractor to participate as a FICS sports chiropractor at an international event. For example, Sports Chiropractors must complete their ICSC before being selected to provide care at Sporting Federation Games.

== Awards and honors ==
The FICS Executive Board bestows various awards upon individuals whom they deem to have made considerable contributions to the professional specialty of sports chiropractic. These awards include "Sports Chiropractor of the Year" and FICS' Gold Medal. The latter is considered one of the highest awards that sports chiropractors can earn internationally.

In 2011 at the World Chiropractic Congress, in Rio de Janeiro, they awarded the "FICS' Founder's Award" to Dr. Stephen Press, one of FICS' founder and first president.

== Pro bono work ==
FICS has promoted the participation of chiropractors in sports medicine teams, and has organized chiropractors to provide treatment at many national and international sporting events including the winter and summer Olympics. It has held Congresses in Mexico City, Rome, the United States (e.g., New Jersey and Washington, DC), Australia, Iowa, Montreal, and Tokyo; and sent delegations to Moscow, Africa, and Caracas.

== Recognition ==
- ICSSPE - FICS is a member of the Associations' Board of the International Council of Sport Science and Physical Education
- SportAccord - Associate member of international sports accrediting agency SportAccord (the former GAISF).
- UNESCO - Affiliate of the United Nations Educational, Scientific and Cultural Organization.
- IWGA International World Games Association, in contract with FICS to provide all medical services at World Games.

== Events ==
FICS Chiropractors have provided treatment at events including:

- African Championships in Athletics (1988)
- African Championships in Athletics (1990)
- All-Africa Games (1991)
- World Track and Field Championships (1991)
- XVIth Winter Olympic Games (1992)
- All-Africa Games (1999)
- Gunston 500 International Surfing Competition (1998)
- Ontario Games (2000)
- Maritime Life Olympic Trials (2000)
- Canadian Paralympic Trials (2000)
- World Surfing Games (2000)
- Summer Olympics (2000)
- Mediterranean Games (2001)
- XIXth Central American and Caribbean Games (2002)
- Winter Olympics (2002)
- World Games (2005)
- Summer Olympics (2008)
- World Games (2009)
- PanAm Games (2011)
- World Games (2013)
- World Games (2017)
- World Urban Games / GAISF games(2019)
- CSIT Games 2019 (2019)
- World Games (2022)
- CSIT Games (2023)
- World Combat Games / SportAccord (2023)
