= Performance Health =

Company; medical and physical therapy supply manufacturing company

- Formerly: Hygenic Corporation
- Company type: Private
- Industry: Manufacturing
- Founded: 1925 (Hygenic)
- Founder: Chris Cox, Craig Cox, Perry Isenberg
- Headquarters: Warrenville, Illinois, U.S.
- Number of locations: 15
- Area served: Worldwide
- Products: Dyna-Band; Aquafins; Parabath; Hygenic
- Revenue: NA
- Owner: Madison Dearborn Partners
- Number of employees: 1200 (2023)
- Website: www.performancehealth.com

Performance Health is a medical and physical therapy supply manufacturing company head-quartered in Illinois, United States. The company is a merge of two companies: Performance Health Inc, which originated in Export, Pennsylvania and Hygenic Corporation which originated in Akron, Ohio. They manufacture and deliver products for the healthcare industry, such as mobility and physical therapy equipment, diagnostic tools, and pain relief products.

== History ==
Hygenic Corporation was founded in 1925 by Walter P. Keith. They originated the Thera-Band, Dyna-Band, Parabath, and Hygenic products.

In 2006, Hygenic bought Performance Health Inc., a company from Export, Pennsylvania that makes the Biofreeze topical analgesic and the Prossage warming massage ointment.

Hygenic has changed hands several times being bought and sold by private equity firms.

In 2016, Hygenic / Performance Health was acquired by Patterson Medical. Its headquarters was moved to Warrenville, Illinois, but its facilities at Akron, Ohio and Cuyahoga Falls, Ohio were retained.

In 2018, the National Basketball Association (NBA)'s Portland Trail Blazers selected Biofreeze as their jersey patch sponsor.

In 2021, the Biofreeze and TheraPearl brands were sold to the English consumer goods company Reckitt.
