= Tokunbo =

Tokunbo (Yoruba: Tòkunbọ̀, pronounced [tòkũ̄bɔ̀]) is primarily a unisex Yoruba given name, meaning 'returned from overseas'. It may refer to:

== People ==
- Mukhail Adetokunbo "Tokunbo" Abiru (born 1964), Nigerian banker and politician
- Tokunbo Afikuyomi (born 1962), Nigerian politician
- Ramsey Tokunbo Nouah Jr. (born 1970), Nigerian actor and film director
- Tokunbo Olajide (born 1976), Canadian former boxer
- Tokunbo Olowofoyeku (born 1952), known as Toby Foyeh, British-Nigerian musician

== Other uses ==
- Tòkunbò, a 2024 Nigerian action drama film
- Tokunbo vehicle, a term for European vehicles imported to Nigeria

== See also ==
- Adetokunbo
- Olatokunbo
