= Mariah Riddlesprigger =

Volleyball player

Mariah Antetokounmpo

Personal information
- Born: 17 September 1992 (age 34); Fresno, California, U.S.
- Height: 5 ft 10 in (1.78 m)

Volleyball information
- Position: Outside hitter

Career
Years	Teams
2010–2014	Rice Owls

Mariah Danae Antetokounmpo (née Riddlesprigger; born September 17, 1992) is an American entrepreneur and former volleyball player. She is married to NBA All-Star Giannis Antetokounmpo.

== Early life and education ==
Born Mariah Danae Riddlesprigger in Fresno, California. She attended Rice University in Houston, Texas, where she earned a degree in Sports Management and Sociology in 2014. During her time at Rice, she played volleyball as an outside hitter for the university's team.

== Career ==
Following her graduation from Rice University, Antetokounmpo interned with the NBA Summer League for two consecutive years. She later worked in the basketball operations department for the Philadelphia 76ers.

In 2021, Antetokounmpo launched her own apparel brand, "Sincerely, Mariah." The brand features loungewear with messages intended to promote positivity and self-empowerment. The creation of the brand was influenced by her experiences during the COVID-19 pandemic.

Antetokounmpo is heavily involved in the Charles Antetokounmpo Family Foundation's (CAFF) impact and philanthropic work.

== Personal life ==
Mariah Antetokounmpo and Giannis Antetokounmpo were married on September 1, 2024, following a three-day celebration at the Costa Navarino resort near Pylos, Greece. The wedding was attended by numerous high-profile guests, including LeBron James, Jrue Holiday, Serena Williams, and Greek Prime Minister Kyriakos Mitsotakis. The couple's longtime friend and Bucks teammate Khris Middleton served as the best man.

The couple have been together since 2014, when they first met at the 2014 NBA Summer League. They have four children: Liam Charles (born 2020), Maverick Shai (born 2021), Eva Brooke (born 2023), and Aria Capri (born 2025). The family participates in various philanthropic activities, particularly in the Milwaukee area. Mariah is Catholic.

The Antetokounmpo family founded the Charles Antetokounmpo Family Foundation in 2022. The Foundation's work focuses their impact on supporting basic needs and leveraging the power of sport, and works across the three geographies the Antetokounmpos have called home: Greece, Nigeria, and Milwaukee, WI, USA.

=== Advocacy and community involvement ===
Riddlesprigger is involved in advocacy for maternal and infant health, with a particular focus on addressing racial disparities in healthcare. She has spoken about her own experiences with pre-eclampsia during her first pregnancy, which has informed her work in this area. She is also a board member of the Milwaukee Diaper Mission.
