= Kostas Antetokounmpo =

Greek basketball player (born 1997)

Kostas Antetokounmpo Κώστας Αντετοκούνμπο
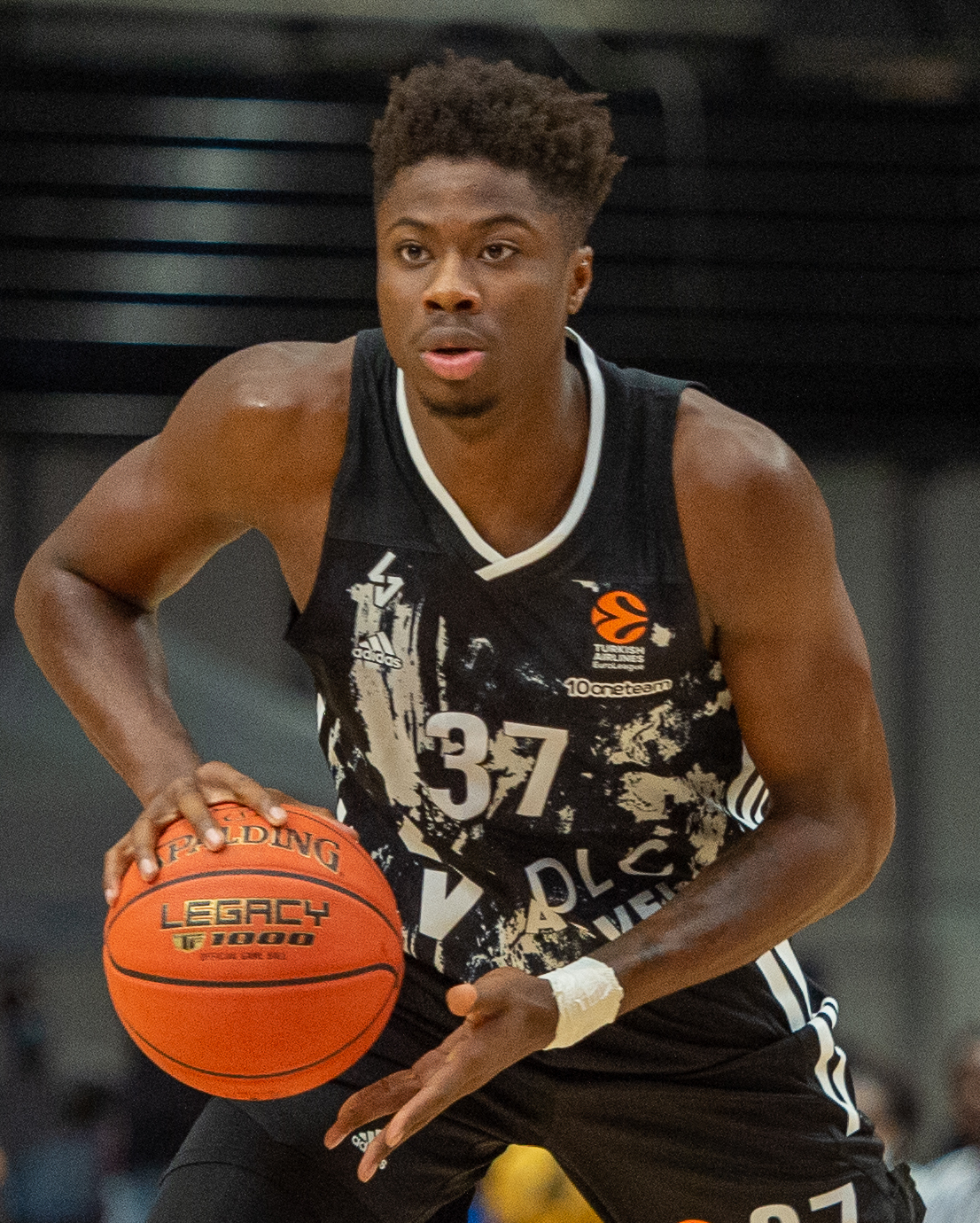
- Antetokounmpo with ASVEL in 2022

No. 37 – Aris Thessaloniki
- Position: Center
- League: GBL; EuroCup

Personal information
- Born: November 20, 1997 (age 28) Athens, Attica, Greece
- Listed height: 6 ft 10 in (2.08 m)
- Listed weight: 200 lb (91 kg)

Career information
- High school: Dominican (Whitefish Bay, Wisconsin)
- College: Dayton (2017–2018)
- NBA draft: 2018: 2nd round, 60th overall pick
- Drafted by: Philadelphia 76ers
- Playing career: 2018–present

Career history
- 2018–2019: Dallas Mavericks
- 2018–2019: →Texas Legends
- 2019–2021: Los Angeles Lakers
- 2019–2021: →South Bay Lakers
- 2021–2022: ASVEL
- 2022: Windy City Bulls
- 2022–2023: Fenerbahçe
- 2023–2025: Panathinaikos
- 2025: UCAM Murcia
- 2025–2026: Olympiacos
- 2026: →Aris Thessaloniki
- 2026–present: Aris Thessaloniki

Career highlights
- NBA champion (2020); EuroLeague champion (2024); Greek League champion (2024); Greek Supercup winner (2025); French League champion (2022); Greek League All-Star (2023)
- Stats at NBA.com
- Stats at Basketball Reference
Medals
Men's basketball
Representing Greece
EuroBasket
Bronze medal – third place	2025 Cyprus–Finland–Poland–Latvia

Konstantinos Entoumpouisi "Kostas" Antetokounmpo (Note: /ˌɑːntɛtəˈkuːmpoʊ/ AHN-tet-ə-KOOM-poh; Greek: Κωνσταντίνος Εντουμπουίσι "Κώστας" Αντετοκούνμπο, IPA: [ˈkostas a(n)detoˈkumbo].) (born Konstantinos Ndubuisi Adetokunbo, (Note: His official surname (Αντετοκούνμπο) is a Greek transcription of his parents' Yoruba language name Adétòkunbọ̀; in Greek, ‹ντ› is used for /d/, ‹ου› for /u/, and ‹μπ› for /b/. This is usually transliterated letter-for-letter back into the Latin alphabet as Antetokounmpo. The same applies to his middle name Entoumpouisi, which stems from the Greek transliteration of Ndubuisi.) November 20, 1997) is a Greek professional basketball player for Aris Thessaloniki of the Greek Basketball League (GBL) and the EuroCup.

Antetokounmpo played college basketball for the Dayton Flyers. He was drafted 60th overall by the Philadelphia 76ers in the 2018 NBA draft, and his draft rights were then traded to the Dallas Mavericks. He won an NBA championship with the Los Angeles Lakers in 2020.

His brothers Giannis, Thanasis and Alex are also professional basketball players.

Kostas, along with his brothers, Giannis, Thanasis and Alex, and hockey player Filip Forsberg, was announced as joining the Nashville SC ownership group in the MLS.

== Early life and family ==
Antetokounmpo was born in Sepolia in Athens, Attica Region, Greece. His parents were immigrants from Nigeria. His late father, Charles, was a former Nigerian soccer player, while his mother, Veronica, was a high jumper. Charles died in September 2017, at age 54. His parents are from different Nigerian ethnic groups; Charles was Yoruba, and Veronica is Igbo.

He has a Nigerian passport, granted to him in June 2013 so that he could gain a visa, and be allowed to legally enter the United States. He officially became a Greek citizen in 2016.

He is the younger brother of basketball players Giannis and Thanasis and the older brother of Alex. His oldest brother, Francis, is also a professional association football player.

He began playing basketball with the junior teams of Filathlitikos, in Athens.

== High school career ==
After his older brother Giannis was drafted by the Milwaukee Bucks in the 2013 NBA draft, Antetokounmpo, along with his parents and his younger brother, Alexis, moved to Milwaukee. He attended Dominican High School in Whitefish Bay, Wisconsin, where he played high school basketball during his junior and senior years. As a senior, he led his team to a state championship.

== College career ==
After high school, Antetokounmpo moved on to play college basketball at the University of Dayton. In the 2016–17 season, his first with the Flyers, he was red-shirted, after being ruled a "partial qualifier", due to having spent his first two years of high school in Greece. He debuted in the 2017–18 season, averaging 5.2 points, 2.9 rebounds, 0.4 assists, 0.2 steals, and 1.1 blocks per game, in 15.1 minutes per game.

== Professional career ==
=== Dallas Mavericks (2018–2019) ===
On March 22, 2018, Antetokounmpo declared for the 2018 NBA draft. On May 4, 2018, Antetokounmpo was one of a record-high 69 players to enter the NBA Draft Combine. Antetokounmpo was projected to be a second round selection, similar to his older brother Thanasis. He was the last pick of the 2018 NBA draft, selected by the Philadelphia 76ers, and then immediately traded to the Dallas Mavericks. Antetokounmpo signed a two-way contract on July 13. Throughout the contract, he would split his playing time between the Mavericks and their NBA G League affiliate, the Texas Legends. During his time in the G-League, he averaged 12.3 points and 7 rebounds per game, earning him the nickname “Mr Fantastic” by Legends Radio Announcer Quinn Redmond. He made his NBA debut on March 20, 2019, in a 118–126 loss to the Portland Trail Blazers.

On July 19, 2019, Antetokounmpo was waived by the Mavericks.

=== Los Angeles Lakers (2019–2021) ===
Antetokounmpo was claimed off waivers by the Los Angeles Lakers on July 22, 2019. He played 5 games throughout the season on a two-way contract and scored a career high 7 points in the team's 136–122 loss to the Sacramento Kings on August 13, 2020. Antetokounmpo won his first championship after the Lakers defeated the Miami Heat in six games. He became the first Greek-born player to win an NBA championship, with his brothers Giannis and Thanasis winning their own championships with the Milwaukee Bucks the next season.

On November 26, 2020, Antetokounmpo re-signed with the Lakers to a two-way contract.

=== ASVEL (2021–2022) ===
On July 16, 2021, Antetokounmpo signed with ASVEL Villeurbanne of the French LNB Pro A and the EuroLeague. In 26 EuroLeague games, he averaged 5.8 points, 2.6 rebounds and 0.7 blocks, playing around 13 minutes per contest.

=== Chicago Bulls (2022) ===
On October 14, 2022, Antetokounmpo signed a two-way contract with the Chicago Bulls. He was waived by the Bulls on December 16, 2022, without appearing in a game for the team at the NBA level.

=== Fenerbahçe (2022–2023) ===
On December 19, 2022, Antetokounmpo signed with Fenerbahçe Beko of the Turkish Basketball Super League (BSL). In 14 EuroLeague games, he averaged 2.7 points and 0.8 rebounds, playing around 7 minutes per contest. On June 20, 2023, he mutually parted ways with the club.

=== Panathinaikos (2023–2025) ===
On June 22, 2023, Antetokounmpo signed a two-year contract with Panathinaikos of the Greek Basket League and the EuroLeague, where his older brother Thanasis had previously played for two seasons. On February 5, 2025, coach Ergin Ataman announced that Antetokounmpo would be parting ways with the defending EuroLeague champions. On February 11, 2025, he mutually parted ways with the team.

=== UCAM Murcia (2025) ===
Antetokounmpo finished out the 2024–2025 campaign playing for Spanish club UCAM Murcia of the Liga ACB and BCL, signing in February 2025.

=== Olympiacos (2025–2026) ===
On July 10, 2025, Antetokounmpo signed a two-year contract with Olympiacos.

==== Loan to Aris (2026) ====
On January 4, 2026, it was announced that Antetokounmpo would be loaned out to Aris of the Greek Basketball League and the EuroCup. The news came as Olympiacos announced the signing of Tyrique Jones. The move was officially announced by Olympiacos on January 9, 2026.

=== Aris (2026–present) ===
On July 5, 2026, Antetokounmpo signed a three–year deal with Aris Thessaloniki of the Greek Basketball League (GBL) and the EuroCup.

== National team career ==
=== Greek junior national team ===
Antetokounmpo played with the junior Greek Under-20 national team. He played at the 2016 FIBA Europe Under-20 Championship Division B, where he won a bronze medal. During the tournament, he averaged 1.3 points, 1.8 rebounds, and 0.3 assists per game.

=== Greek senior national team ===
Antetokounmpo played with the senior men's Greek national team at the 2020 Victoria FIBA World Olympic Qualifying Tournament, and at the EuroBasket 2022.

== Career statistics ==
Legend
GP	Games played	GS	Games started	MPG	Minutes per game
FG%	Field-goal percentage	3P%	3-point field-goal percentage	FT%	Free-throw percentage
RPG	Rebounds per game	APG	Assists per game	SPG	Steals per game
BPG	Blocks per game	PPG	Points per game	PIR	Performance index rating
**Bold**	Career high

=== NBA ===
==== Regular season ====
†	Denotes seasons in which Antetokounmpo won the NBA championship

Year	Team	GP	GS	MPG	FG%	3P%	FT%	RPG	APG	SPG	BPG	PPG
2018–19	Dallas	2	0	**5.5**	.000	—	.500	.5	—	**1.0**	—	1.0
2019–20†	L.A. Lakers	5	0	4.0	**1.000**	—	.500	.6	**.4**	—	—	**1.4**
2020–21	L.A. Lakers	**15**	0	3.7	.300	—	.462	**1.3**	.1	.1	**.3**	0.8
Career		22	0	4.0	.375	—	.474	1.0	.1	.2	.2	1.0

=== EuroLeague ===
†	Denotes season in which Antetokounmpo won the EuroLeague
*	Led the league

Year	Team	GP	GS	MPG	FG%	3P%	FT%	RPG	APG	SPG	BPG	PPG	PIR
2021–22	ASVEL	26	3	**13.1**	.700	**.400**	.548	**2.6**	.3	**.5**	**.7**	**5.8**	**7.1**
2022–23	Fenerbahçe	14	**4**	6.5	**.778***	.000	**.588**	.8	**.4**	.2	.1	2.7	2.3
2023–24†	Panathinaikos	**31**	3	7.2	.633	—	.391	1.7	.2	.3	**.7**	2.6	3.3
Career		71	10	9.3	.688	.333	.486	1.9	.3	.4	.6	3.8	4.5

=== Domestic leagues ===
Year	Team	League	GP	MPG	FG%	3P%	FT%	RPG	APG	SPG	BPG	PPG
2018–19	(United States) Texas Legends	G League	40	25.4	.522	.244	.685	6.1	.8	1.0	1.3	10.5
2019–20	(United States) South Bay Lakers	G League	38	25.5	.623	.154	.585	7.9	1.5	.8	1.3	14.1
2021–22	(France) ASVEL	LNB Élite	26	10.6	.656	.167	.548	2.1	.3	.4	.9	3.9
2022–23	(United States) Windy City Bulls	G League	12	29.0	.670	.200	.500	6.3	1.6	1.2	1.3	11.7
2022–23	(Turkey) Fenerbahçe	TBSL	3	17.6	.643	.000	.417	5.0	.3	.3	1.0	7.7
2023–24	(Greece) Panathinaikos	GBL	29	12.7	.650	.286	.473	3.3	.7	.5	.9	5.9

=== College ===
Year	Team	GP	GS	MPG	FG%	3P%	FT%	RPG	APG	SPG	BPG	PPG
2016–17	Dayton	Redshirt										
2017–18	Dayton	29	6	15.1	.574	.133	.516	2.9	.4	.2	1.1	5.2
Career		29	6	15.1	.574	.133	.516	2.9	.4	.2	1.1	5.2
