= Alex Antetokounmpo =

Greek basketball player (born 2001)

Alex Antetokounmpo Άλεξ Αντετοκούνμπο
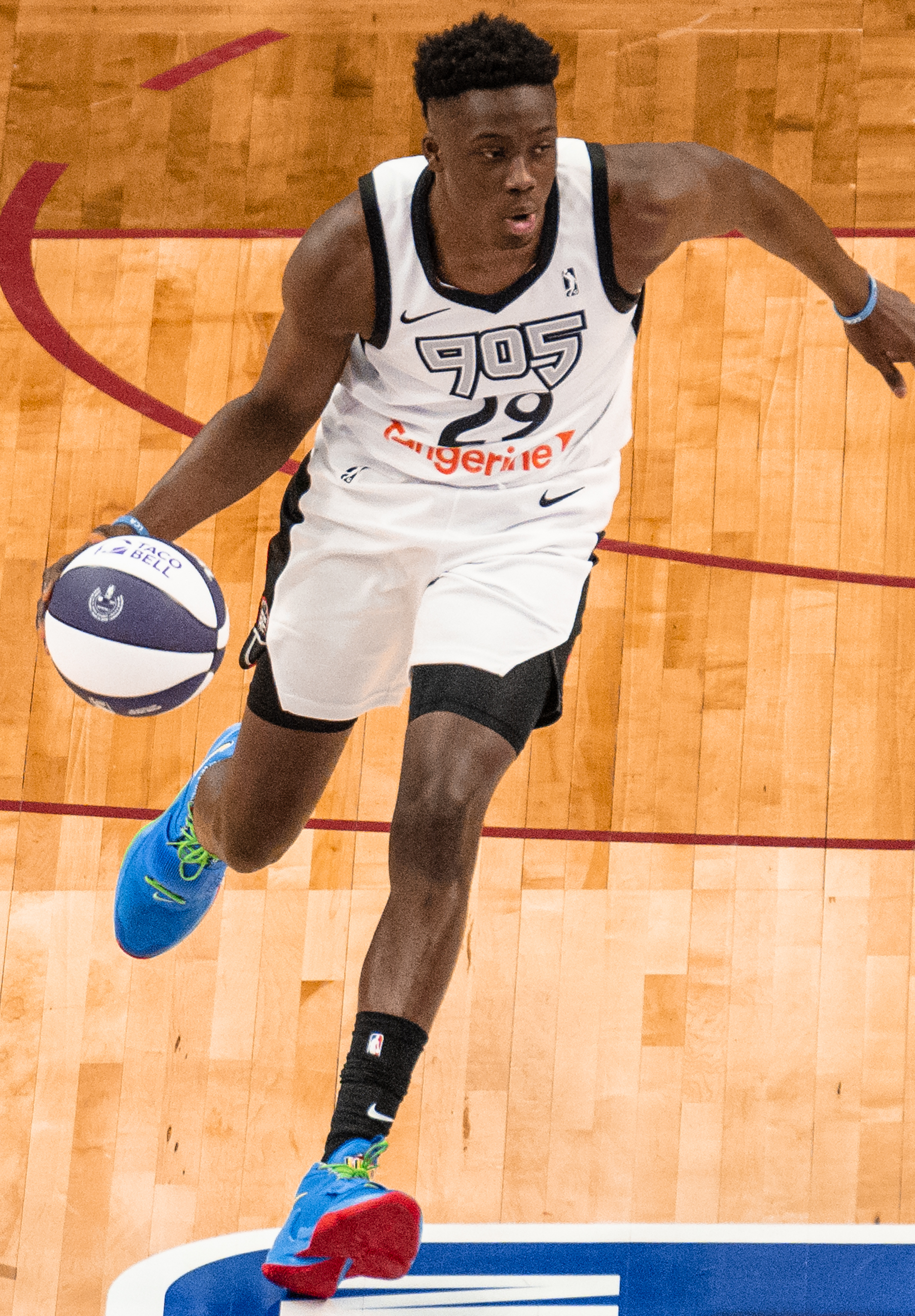
- Antetokounmpo in the 2022 NBA All-Star Skills Challenge

No. 29 – Promitheas Patras
- Position: Small forward / power forward
- League: GBL; BCL

Personal information
- Born: 27 August 2001 (age 25) Athens, Attica, Greece
- Listed height: 6 ft 8 in (2.03 m)
- Listed weight: 214 lb (97 kg)

Career information
- High school: Dominican (Whitefish Bay, Wisconsin)
- NBA draft: 2021: undrafted
- Playing career: 2020–present

Career history
- 2020–2021: Murcia
- 2020–2021: →Murcia B
- 2021–2022: Raptors 905
- 2022–2024: Wisconsin Herd
- 2024: M-Basket Mažeikiai
- 2024: KK Podgorica
- 2024–2025: PAOK
- 2025: Aris
- 2025–2026: Milwaukee Bucks
- 2025–2026: →Wisconsin Herd
- 2026–present: Promitheas Patras
- Stats at NBA.com
- Stats at Basketball Reference

Alexandros Emeka Antetokounmpo (Note: /ˌɑːntɛtəˈkuːmpoʊ/ AHN-tet-ə-KOOM-poh; Greek: Αλέξανδρος Εμέκα "Άλεξ" Αντετοκούνμπο, IPA: [ˈaleks a(n)detoˈkumbo].) (born Adetokunbo, (Note: His official surname (Αντετοκούνμπο) is a Greek transcription of his parents' Yoruba language name Adétòkunbọ̀; in Greek, ‹ντ› is used for /d/, ‹ου› for /u/, and ‹μπ› for /b/. This is usually transliterated letter-for-letter back into the Latin alphabet as Antetokounmpo.) 27 August 2001) is a Greek professional basketball player for Promitheas Patras of the Greek Basket League (GBL) and the Basketball Champions League (BCL). He is the youngest brother of basketball players Giannis, Thanasis, and Kostas.

== Early life ==
Antetokounmpo was born in Sepolia, a neighbourhood in Athens, Attica Region, Greece, as the son of Nigerian parents Veronica and Charles Antetokounmpo. He has a Nigerian passport, which he received in June 2013, so that he could gain a visa, and be allowed to legally enter into the United States. He received Greek citizenship in September 2021, alongside his mother. He started playing basketball at age nine, and in sixth grade, moved with his family to Cudahy, Wisconsin, near where his older brother Giannis was practicing for his rookie season for the Milwaukee Bucks of the (NBA) National Basketball Association. Before high school he moved to River Hills, Wisconsin. He attended Dominican High School in Whitefish Bay, Wisconsin.

== High school career ==
Antetokounmpo played basketball for Dominican High School in Whitefish Bay for four years. As a freshman, he averaged 2.9 points per game, and grew about 12 cm (five inches) to 2.03 m (6 ft 8 in) by the time he was a sophomore. Antetokounmpo was a two-time all-state selection and averaged 20 points and seven rebounds per game as a senior. He received scholarship offers from DePaul, Ohio and Green Bay. On 9 May 2020, Antetokounmpo announced that he would play in Europe after graduating from high school, rather than playing college basketball. He was considered a three-star recruit by major recruiting services.

== Professional career ==
=== UCAM Murcia (2020–2021) ===
On 22 June 2020, Antetokounmpo signed a three-year contract with UCAM Murcia of the Liga ACB. On 18 October, he made his debut for the club's reserve team in the Liga EBA, recording 28 points and six rebounds, shooting 6-of-9 from three-point range, in an 83–69 win over SCD Carolinas.

=== Raptors 905 (2021–2022) ===
After going undrafted in the 2021 NBA draft, Antetokounmpo joined the Sacramento Kings for the 2021 NBA Summer League. The Sacramento Kings then proceeded to win the 2021 NBA Summer League. On 14 October 2021, Antetokounmpo was signed to an Exhibit 10 contract by the Toronto Raptors. However, he was waived the following day to join the Raptors 905 as an affiliate player.

=== Wisconsin Herd (2022–2024) ===
On 3 November 2022, Antetokounmpo was named to the opening night roster for the Wisconsin Herd in the NBA G League.

On 31 August 2023, Antetokounmpo signed with the Milwaukee Bucks, but was waived the same day and on 30 October, he rejoined Wisconsin. On 8 February 2024, he was waived by the Herd.

=== Mažeikiai (2024) ===
On 13 February 2024, Antetokounmpo signed with M Basket-Delamode Mažeikiai of the Lithuanian Basketball League.

=== Podgorica (2024) ===
On 17 August 2024, Antetokounmpo signed with Podgorica of the Prva A Liga and the ABA League 2, eventually playing only five games for the Montenegrin club.

=== PAOK (2024–2025) ===
On 22 October 2024, Antetokounmpo signed with PAOK of the Greek Basketball League. On 31 July 2025, he renewed his contract with the FIBA Europe Cup finalists. On 13 August of the same year, however, Antetokounmpo requested to be released from the club.

=== Aris (2025) ===
On 15 August 2025, Antetokounmpo signed a two-year contract with Aris. However, he appeared in only two official games with the club.

=== Milwaukee Bucks / Wisconsin Herd (2025–2026) ===
On 13 October 2025, Antetokounmpo signed a two-way contract with the Milwaukee Bucks, marking the first time in NBA franchise history that three brothers — Giannis, Thanasis, and Alex— played on the same team.

On 31 March 2026, Antetokounmpo made his NBA and Bucks debut, putting up 3 points in a 123–99 win over the Dallas Mavericks.. Including that debut, he played in 6 of the Bucks' final 8 games of the season.

=== Promitheas Patras (2026–present) ===
On 27 June 2026, Greek basketball club Promitheas Patras B.C. announced that Antetokounmpo would be joining the team for the upcoming season. As of 8 July, however, he is also still listed on the Milwaukee Bucks' roster, and no departure announcement has been made.

== Personal life ==
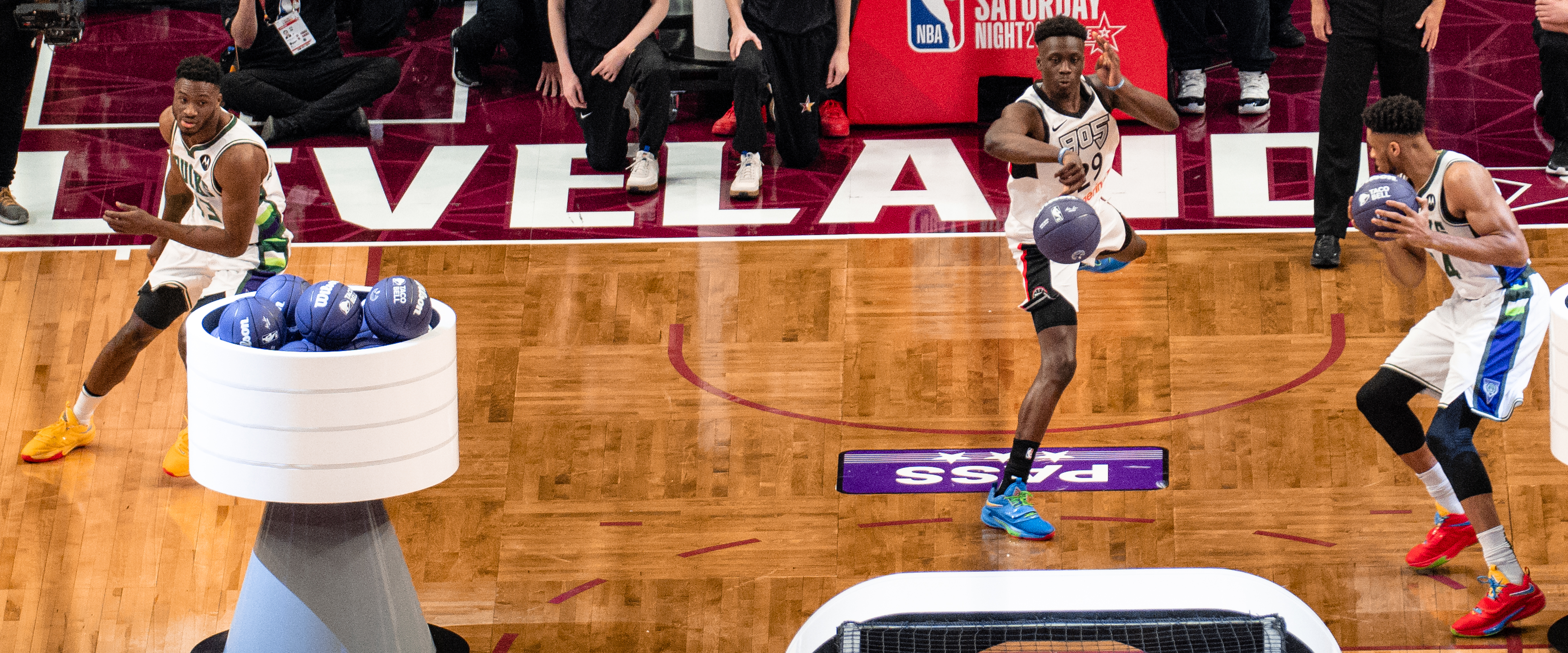
The Antetokounmpo brothers participating in the 2022 NBA All-Star Skills Challenge

Three of his older brothers, Giannis, Thanasis and Kostas, play basketball professionally, and all three have won NBA championships. Giannis was named NBA Most Valuable Player in both 2019 and 2020. Thanasis and Giannis won the NBA championship in 2021 with the Milwaukee Bucks, where Giannis was also named Finals MVP. Kostas last played for the Chicago Bulls and won an NBA title with the Los Angeles Lakers in 2020.

In 2025, Alex joined the Milwaukee Bucks on a two-way contract, becoming teammates with Giannis and Thanasis.

Antetokounmpo's father, Charles, and his oldest brother, Francis, played soccer in Nigeria. His mother, Veronica, was a high jumper.

In September 2021, Alex and his mother were granted honorary Greek citizenship by the Prime Minister of Greece, Kyriakos Mitsotakis.

Alex, hockey player Filip Forsberg, and three of his older brothers — Giannis, Thanasis, and Kostas — were also announced as part of the Nashville SC ownership group in MLS.

== Career statistics ==
Legend
GP	Games played	GS	Games started	MPG	Minutes per game
FG%	Field goal percentage	3P%	3-point field goal percentage	FT%	Free throw percentage
RPG	Rebounds per game	APG	Assists per game	SPG	Steals per game
BPG	Blocks per game	PPG	Points per game	**Bold**	Career high

=== NBA ===
Year	Team	GP	GS	MPG	FG%	3P%	FT%	RPG	APG	SPG	BPG	PPG
2025–26	Milwaukee	6	0	3.5	.375	.286	.733	1.0	.2	.0	.2	3.2
Career		6	0	3.5	.375	.286	.733	1.0	.2	.0	.2	3.2
