= Adetokunbo =

- Gender: Unisex, although predominantly male
- Language: Yoruba language

Origin
- Origin: Nigerian
- Meaning: The crown or royalty from across the seas (ocean), otherwise the crown or royalty from a foreign land (abroad)
- Region of origin: Southwestern Nigeria

Adétòkunbọ̀ (Yoruba pronunciation: [ādétòkũ̄bɔ̀]) is both a surname and a given name of Yoruba origin meaning "the crown or royalty from across the seas (ocean)" or "the crown or royalty from a foreign land (abroad)".

The name ultimately consists of two parts: Adé which simply means "crown/royalty" (and can also be used to form other Yorùbá names such as Adéwálẹ̀), and Tòkunbọ from ti-òkun-bọ̀ which roughly means "came (by) sea (and) arrived", and is often applied/given to Yorùbá children/people born outside of Africa, or that are majorly part of the Nigerian diaspora.

== Surname ==
- Antetokounmpo (basketball-playing brothers from Greece): (Note: The following individuals with the Adétòkunbọ̀ surname live in Greece. In Modern Greek, voiced stops such as /b/ or /d/ are commonly transcribed using digraphs, respectively ‹μπ› (mp) for /b/ and ‹ντ› (nt) for /d/. As a result, the surname Adétòkunbọ̀ is commonly transcribed Αντετοκούνμπο in Greek, which is pronounced [a(n)detoˈkumbo] and in turn romanized as Antetokounmpo. This practice reflects literally the order of the Greek letters (transliteration) rather than reflecting the name's pronunciation in Yoruba or in Greek (phonetic or orthographic transcription).)
  - Alex Antetokounmpo (born 2001), Greek basketball player for the Milwaukee Bucks in the NBA.
  - Giannis Antetokounmpo (born 1994), Greek basketball player for the Miami Heat in the NBA.
  - Kostas Antetokounmpo (born 1997), Greek basketball player for Olympiacos in the GBL and the EuroLeague.
  - Thanasis Antetokounmpo (born 1992), Greek basketball player for the Milwaukee Bucks in the NBA.

== Given name ==
- Adetokunbo Ademola (1906–1993), Nigerian jurist
- Adetokunbo Kayode (born 1958), Nigerian politician
- Adetokunbo Lucas (1931–2020), Nigerian physician
- Adetokunbo Ogundeji (born 1998), American football player

== See also ==
- Adetokumboh M'Cormack (born 1982), Sierra Leonean-born American actor
