= Giannis Antetokounmpo =

Nigerian-Greek basketball player (born 1994)

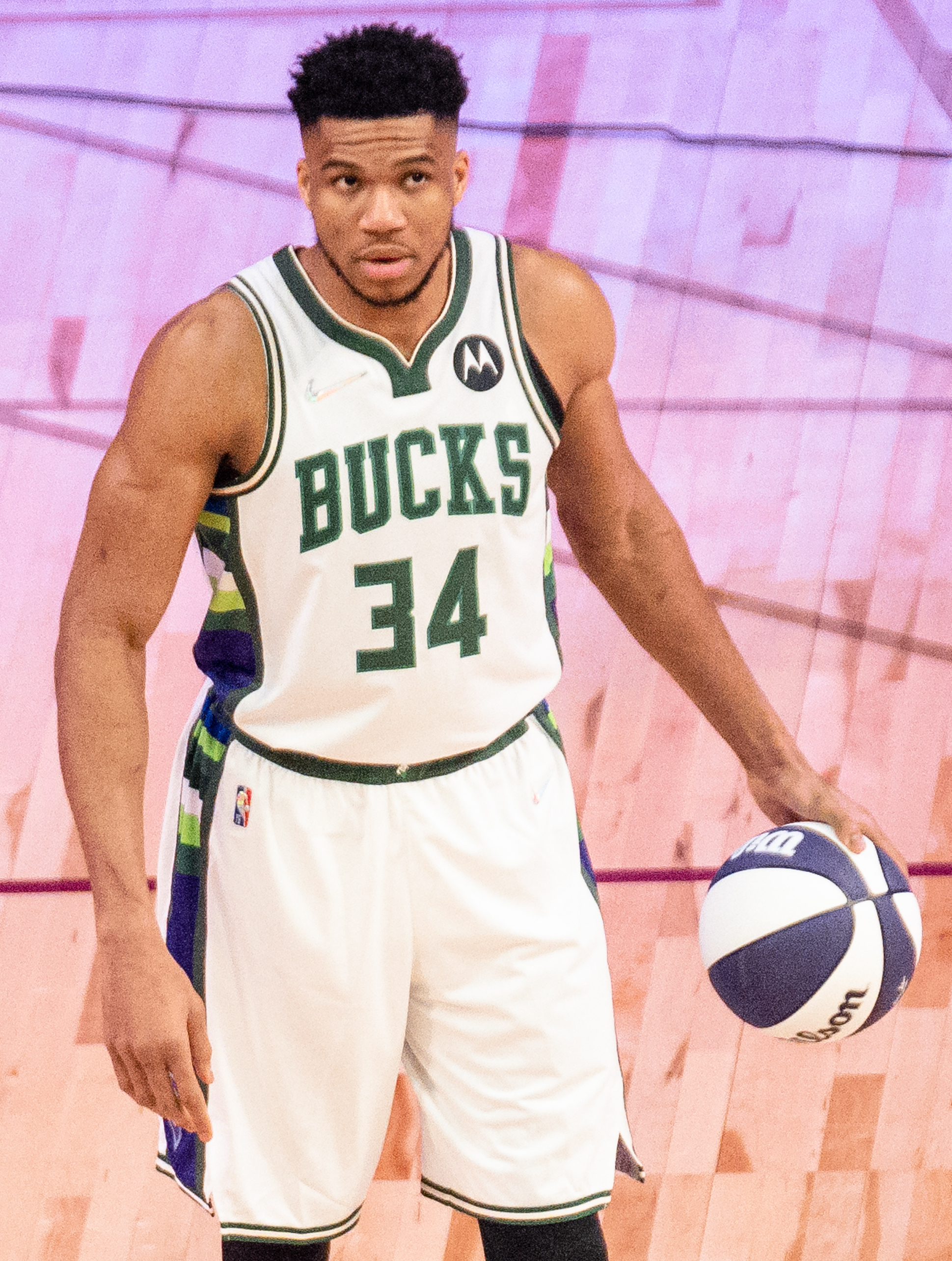
- Antetokounmpo with the Milwaukee Bucks during the 2022 All-Star Weekend

No. 7 – Miami Heat
- Position: Power forward
- League: NBA

Personal information
- Born: December 6, 1994 (age 31) Athens, Attica, Greece
- Listed height: 6 ft 11 in (2.11 m)
- Listed weight: 250 lb (113 kg)

Career information
- NBA draft: 2013: 1st round, 15th overall pick
- Drafted by: Milwaukee Bucks
- Playing career: 2011–present

Career history
- 2011–2013: Filathlitikos
- 2013–2026: Milwaukee Bucks
- 2026–present: Miami Heat

Career highlights
- NBA champion (2021); NBA Finals MVP (2021); 2× NBA Most Valuable Player (2019, 2020); 10× NBA All-Star (2017–2026); NBA All-Star Game MVP (2021); 7× All-NBA First Team (2019–2025); 2× All-NBA Second Team (2017, 2018); NBA Defensive Player of the Year (2020); 4× NBA All-Defensive First Team (2019–2022); NBA All-Defensive Second Team (2017); NBA Most Improved Player (2017); NBA All-Rookie Second Team (2014); NBA Cup champion (2024); NBA Cup MVP (2024); NBA 75th Anniversary Team; Euroscar Player of the Year (2018)
- Stats at NBA.com
- Stats at Basketball Reference
Medals
Men's basketball
Representing Greece
EuroBasket
Bronze medal – third place	2025 Cyprus–Finland–Poland–Latvia

Giannis Sina Ougko Antetokounmpo (Note: /ˈjɑːnɪs ˈuːɡoʊ ˌɑːntɛtəˈkuːmpoʊ/ YAH-niss OO-goh AHN-tet-ə-KOOM-poh; Greek: Γιάννης Σίνα-Ούγκο Αντετοκούνμπο, IPA: [ˈʝanis a(n)detoˈkumbo].) (born Giannis Sina Ugo Adetokunbo, (Note: His official surname (Αντετοκούνμπο) is a Greek transcription of his parents' Yoruba language name Adétòkunbọ̀; in Greek, ‹ντ› is used for /d/, ‹ου› for /u/, and ‹μπ› for /b/. This is usually transliterated letter-for-letter back into the Latin alphabet as Antetokounmpo. The same applies to his middle name Ougko, which stems from the Greek transliteration of Ugo.) December 6, 1994) is a Greek-Nigerian professional basketball player for the Miami Heat of the National Basketball Association (NBA). His size, speed, and strength have earned him the nickname "Greek Freak". He is widely regarded as one of the greatest players and power forwards of all time.

Born and raised in Athens to Nigerian parents, Antetokounmpo began playing basketball for the youth teams of Filathlitikos in Athens. In 2011, he began playing for the club's senior team before entering the 2013 NBA draft, where he was selected 15th overall by the Milwaukee Bucks. In 2016–17, he led the Bucks in all five major statistical categories and became the first player in NBA history to finish a regular season in the top 20 in all five statistics: total points, rebounds, assists, steals, and blocks. He received the NBA Most Improved Player award in 2017. Antetokounmpo has received ten NBA All-Star selections, including being selected as an All-Star captain in 2019, 2020, 2023, and 2024 as he led the Eastern Conference in voting in these four years.

One of the most decorated players in NBA history, Antetokounmpo won consecutive NBA Most Valuable Player (MVP) awards in 2019 and 2020, joining Kareem Abdul-Jabbar and LeBron James as the only players in NBA history to win two MVPs before turning 26. Along with his second MVP award, he was named the NBA Defensive Player of the Year in 2020, becoming only the third player, after Michael Jordan (1988) and Hakeem Olajuwon (1994), to win both awards in the same season. Antetokounmpo is a nine-time All-NBA Team member (including seven first-team selections). In 2021, he led the Bucks to their first NBA championship since 1971 and was named Finals MVP. The same year, Antetokounmpo was honored as one of the league's greatest players of all time by being named to the NBA 75th Anniversary Team.

Antetokounmpo was named one of Time's 100 most influential people in the world in 2021 and has been listed by Forbes as one of the world's ten highest-paid athletes in 2022 and 2024.

For his sporting achievements in his discipline, on July 10, 2024, the Hellenic Olympic Committee designated him as the Greek flag bearer for the Paris 2024 Olympic Games, along with race walker Antigoni Drisbioti. The film Rise, based on the life of Antetokounmpo and his family, was released in 2022.

== Early life ==
As the son of immigrants from Nigeria, Giannis Sina Ugo Adetokunbo was born in Athens, Attica, Greece, on December 6, 1994. His father was a soccer player, and his mother was a high jumper in Nigeria. Three years earlier, they had moved from Lagos, leaving their firstborn son, Francis, under the care of his grandparents. Adetokunbo grew up in the Athens neighborhood of Sepolia in a primarily Nigerian household. His parents, as immigrants without work permits, could not easily find work, so Giannis and his older brother Thanasis helped by hawking watches, handbags, and sunglasses in the streets. In 2007, Adetokunbo started playing basketball.

Although Adetokunbo and three of his four brothers were born in Greece, they did not automatically receive Greek citizenship as Greek nationality law follows jus sanguinis. Growing up, he sometimes felt like an outsider to both the Greek and Nigerian communities in Athens due to his parents' heritage and different skin color in the former, and due to his lack of understanding of the Yoruba or Igbo languages in the latter. For the first 18 years of his life, Adetokunbo could not travel outside the country and was effectively stateless, having no papers from Greece or Nigeria. He was eventually issued Greek citizenship on May 9, 2013, less than two months before the NBA draft.

After gaining Greek citizenship, his official name became Γιάννης Σίνα Ούγκο Αντετοκούνμπο, the Greek transcription of Giannis Sina Ugo Adetokunbo, which was then transliterated letter-for-letter and officially spelled on his Greek passport as Giannis Sina Ougko Antetokounmpo. Giannis is a Modern Greek variant of Ioannes (John). Because many NBA fans could not pronounce his surname, he quickly became known as the "Greek Freak". Antetokounmpo also holds Nigerian citizenship, having received his Nigerian passport in 2015, and as such possesses dual citizenship. He has stated that he feels both Greek and Nigerian and that he embraces both his Greek, as well as his African/Nigerian identity.

== Professional career ==
=== Filathlitikos (2011–2013) ===
Antetokounmpo played with the senior men's team of Filathlitikos in the semi-pro Greek B Basket League (Third Division) during the 2011–12 season.

In December 2012, a few days after turning 18, Antetokounmpo signed a four-year deal with Spanish club CAI Zaragoza, reportedly including NBA buyouts after each season. Several other major European clubs had been interested in adding him, including Barcelona and Anadolu Efes.

During the 2012–13 Greek A2 League season, Antetokounmpo shot 46.4% from the field (62.1% on two-point field goals), 31.3% from three-point range, and 72.0% from the free throw line, while averaging 22.5 minutes per game. Over 26 games, he averaged 9.5 points, 5.0 rebounds, 1.4 assists, and 1.0 blocks per game. He was also selected by the coaches as a special participant in the 2013 Greek League All-Star Game. Though he was not selected as an all-star, coaches let him play in the game as a treat for the fans, since he was attending the game. However, he was not officially counted as an all-star selection, since only players in Greece's top league are eligible to be voted to play in the game, and Antetokounmpo was playing in Greece's second-tier league.

=== Milwaukee Bucks (2013–2026) ===
==== Early years (2013–2016) ====
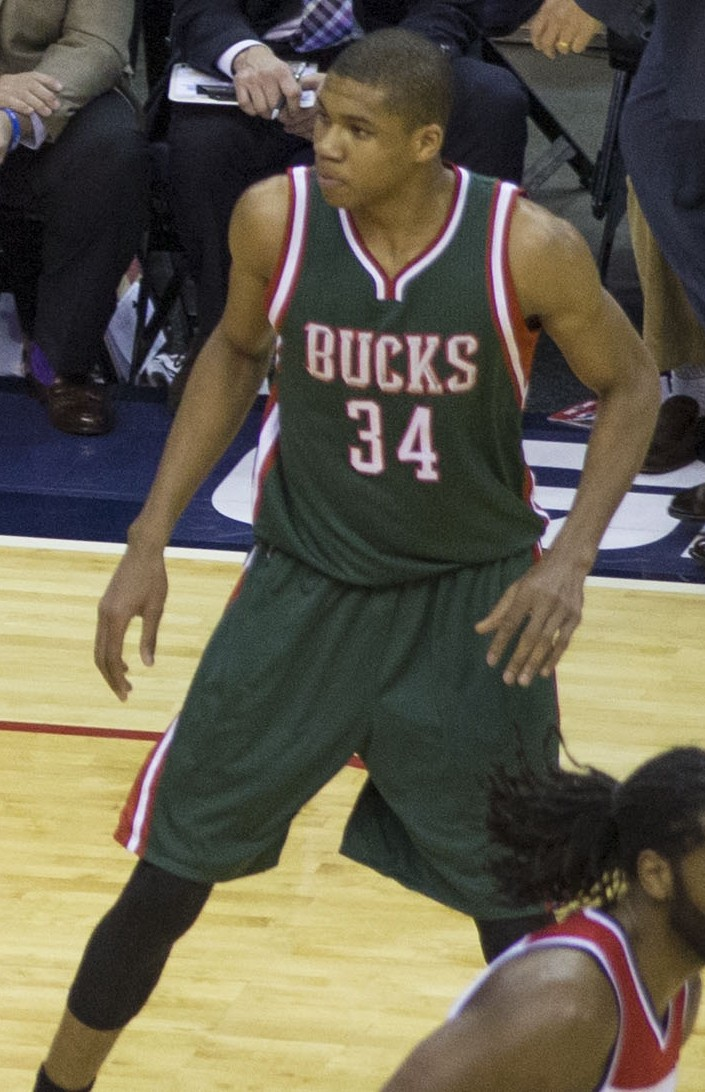
Antetokounmpo with the Bucks in November 2014

On April 28, 2013, Antetokounmpo officially made himself eligible for the 2013 NBA draft. He fulfilled his draft projections as a first-round pick by being selected 15th overall by the Milwaukee Bucks. On July 30, he signed his rookie scale contract with the Bucks. Antetokounmpo selected 34 as his jersey number because his mother was born in 1963 and his father was born in 1964, so he combined the last digits of their birth years.

Antetokounmpo made his NBA debut on October 13, at the age of 18 years, 311 days, as one of the youngest NBA players ever. He averaged 6.8 points, 4.4 rebounds, 1.9 assists, 0.8 steals, and 0.8 blocks in 77 appearances during his rookie season. He scored in double figures 23 times and grabbed at least 10 rebounds twice, with both efforts resulting in double-doubles. He finished the season with 61 total blocks, which led all NBA rookies and was the seventh-most by a rookie in franchise history. He was selected to participate in the Rising Stars Challenge at NBA All-Star Weekend in New Orleans, where he had nine points, two rebounds, and two assists in 17 minutes. At the season's end, he was named to the 2013–14 NBA All-Rookie second team.

Antetokounmpo's second season with the Bucks saw both individual and team development. On February 6, 2015, he recorded a then career-high 27 points and 15 rebounds in a loss to the Houston Rockets. Three days later, he was named the Eastern Conference Player of the Week for games played February 2–8, earning Player of the Week honors for the first time in his career. He later competed in the 2015 NBA Slam Dunk Contest at All-Star Weekend in New York. On March 9, he scored a then career-high 29 points on 11-of-16 shooting in a loss to the New Orleans Pelicans.

In the 2015–16 season, Antetokounmpo developed further, upping his scoring average to almost 17 points per game. On November 19, he scored a then career-high 33 points in a loss to the Cleveland Cavaliers. On December 12, he recorded a near triple-double with 11 points, 12 rebounds, and 8 assists, helping the Bucks snap the Golden State Warriors' 24-game unbeaten start to the season with a 108–95 win. On February 22, 2016, Antetokounmpo recorded his first career triple-double with 27 points, 12 rebounds, and 10 assists in a 108–101 win over the Los Angeles Lakers. At 21 years old, he became the youngest Buck to record a triple-double.

==== First All-Star years (2016–2018) ====
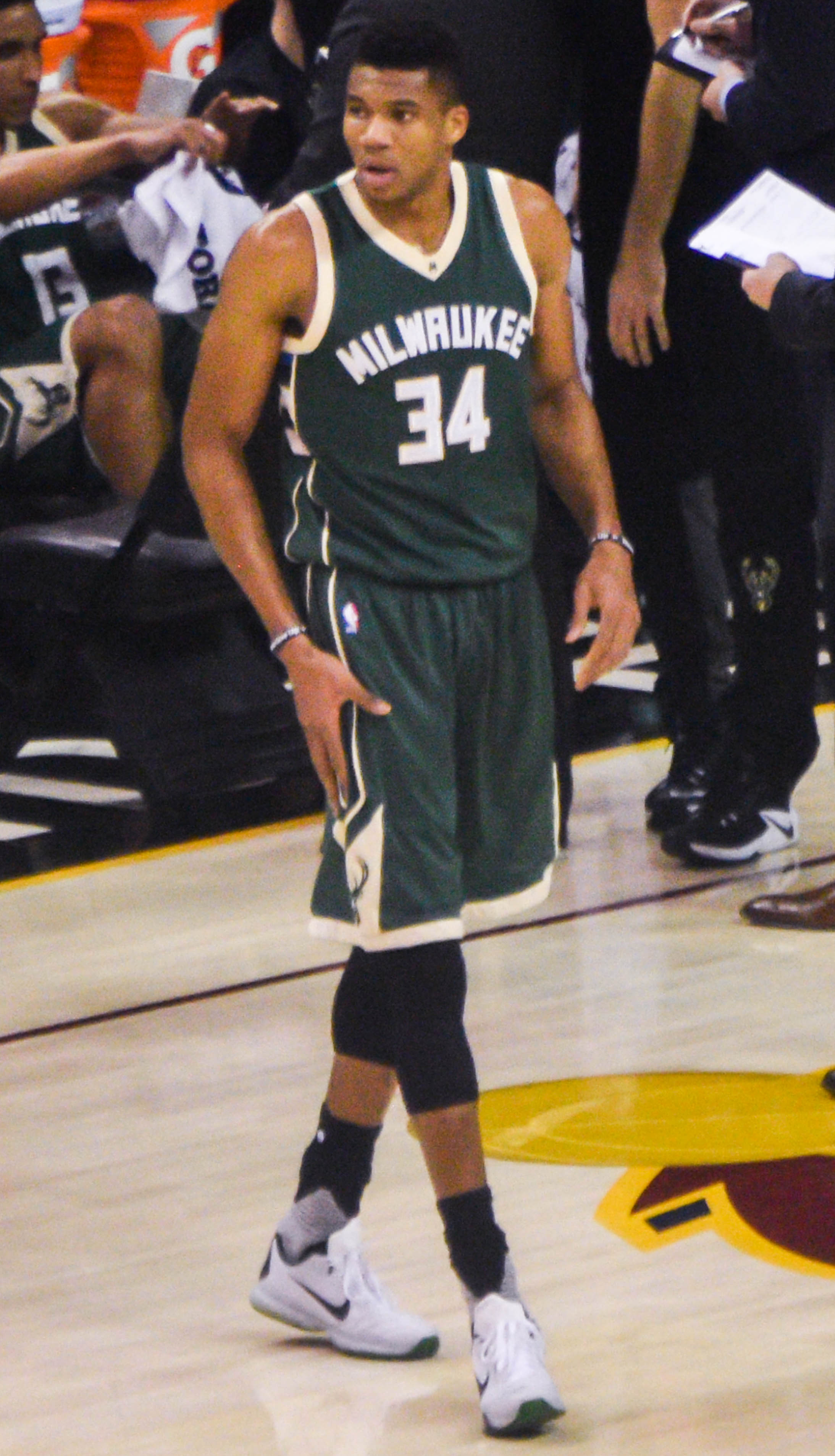
Antetokounmpo with the Bucks in December 2016

On September 19, 2016, Antetokounmpo agreed to a four-year, $100 million contract extension with the Bucks. Antetokounmpo's fourth year with the Bucks would be his breakout season, as he further increased his statistical output and ascended to stardom. On December 23, he had a then career-high 39 points, eight rebounds, and six assists in a 123–96 win over the Washington Wizards. A couple of weeks later, Antetokounmpo recorded 27 points and 13 rebounds and made his first game-winning buzzer-beater, a 15-foot turnaround jumper which gave the Bucks a 105–104 victory over the New York Knicks. With 25 points against the Knicks on January 6, Antetokounmpo had at least 20 points in his 14th consecutive game, matching the longest streak by a Bucks player since Michael Redd in 2006. On January 19, 2017, Antetokounmpo was named a starter on the Eastern Conference All-Star team for the NBA All-Star Game. At 22 years and 74 days old, he became the youngest player in franchise history to start in an All-Star Game. He also became the first Greek NBA All-Star. In the game, he led the East with 30 points in a 192–182 loss to the West. On April 3, he was named Eastern Conference Player of the Month for March. The award was the first of Antetokounmpo's career and the first for a Buck since Redd won the award in January 2004. Antetokounmpo helped the Bucks finish an Eastern Conference-best 14–4 in March, the franchise's first calendar month with at least 14 victories since going 16–2 in February 1971. Antetokounmpo led the Bucks in all of the five major statistical categories (points, rebounds, assists, steals, and blocks) in the regular season, becoming only the fifth NBA player to do so after Dave Cowens, Scottie Pippen, Kevin Garnett, and LeBron James; Nikola Jokić has since matched it. Antetokounmpo also became the first player in NBA history to finish in the top 20 in the league in each of the five major categories in a regular season. As a result of his efforts, Antetokounmpo was named to the All-NBA Second Team, his first All-NBA honor. He was also named the recipient of the NBA Most Improved Player Award for the 2016–17 season, becoming the first player in Bucks history win that award.

On April 15, Antetokounmpo scored a then playoff career-high 28 points in a 97–83 win over the third-seed Toronto Raptors in Game 1 of their first-round playoff series. He would top that total in two subsequent games: in Game 5 on April 24, Antetokounmpo set a new playoff career-high with 30 points, but could not lead the Bucks to a win as they lost 118–93 to go down 3–2 in the series. The Bucks then lost Game 6 three days later, despite a 34-point effort from Antetokounmpo, ending their season.

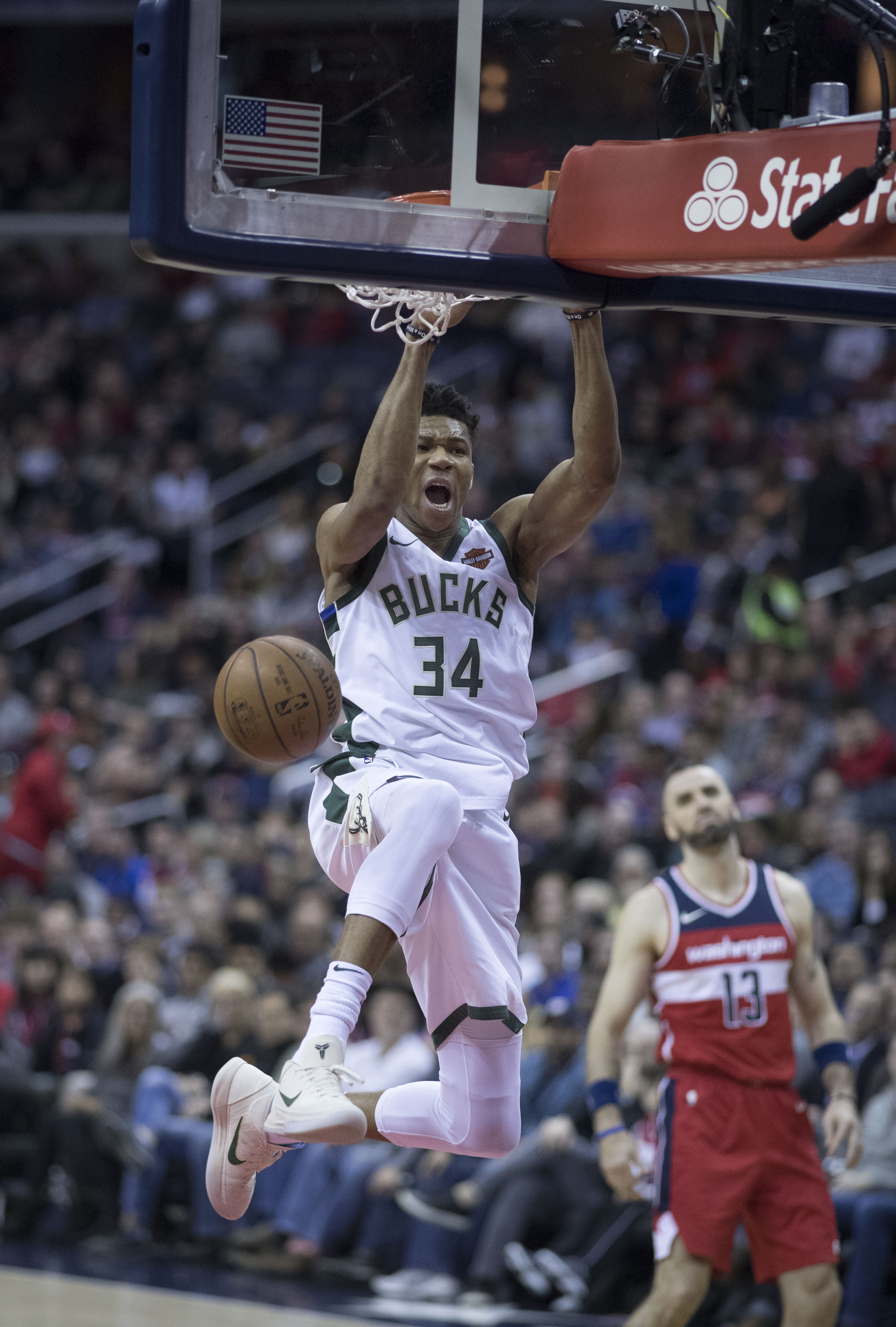
Antetokounmpo dunking against the Washington Wizards in 2018

Antetokounmpo began the 2017–18 season on a tear, scoring 175 points over the first five games of the season, including a then career-high 44 points in a 113–110 win over the Portland Trail Blazers. He averaged almost 27 points during the season, earning his second straight All-Star nomination and All-NBA selection, and broke Kareem Abdul Jabbar's franchise record for triple-doubles.

In Game 1 of the Bucks' first-round playoff series against the Boston Celtics, Antetokounmpo recorded 35 points, 13 rebounds and seven assists in a 113–107 overtime loss. Antetokounmpo's game-winning tip-in in Game 4 equalized the series at two games a piece. However, the Celtics would go on to eliminate the Bucks in seven games, in spite of Antetokounmpo's 22 points and nine rebounds in Game 7.

==== Back-to-back MVP and DPOY award (2018–2020) ====
Starting from the 2018–19 season, Antetokounmpo and the Bucks achieved a period of sustained team success. Under new coach Mike Budenholzer, the Bucks began the season with seven consecutive victories and went 25–10 through the end of December.

Antetokounmpo was critical to this early success, earning the Eastern Conference Player of the Month awards for October, November, December, and February. On March 17, 2019, he scored a then career-high 52 points to go with 16 rebounds in a 130–125 loss to the 76ers. He avenged this loss in an April 4 victory where he recorded 45 points and 13 rebounds in a 128–122 win over Philadelphia, helping the Bucks clinch the No. 1 seed in the conference. Antetokounmpo guided the Bucks to a 60–22 season and the best record in the league. He helped the Bucks advance to the second round of the playoffs for the first time since 2001 after scoring 41 points in a 127–104 win in Game 4 over the Detroit Pistons for a four-game sweep. The Bucks reached the NBA Eastern Conference Finals, where they were defeated 4–2 by the eventual champions, the Raptors, despite winning the first two games. At the 2019 NBA Awards, Antetokounmpo was named the league's Most Valuable Player (MVP). He joined Kareem Abdul-Jabbar as the second Bucks player to win MVP and became the third youngest player to win the MVP over the previous 40 seasons, behind Derrick Rose and LeBron James.

Antetokounmpo began the 2019–20 season with a triple-double, recording 30 points, 13 rebounds, and 11 assists in a 117–111 season-opening win over the Houston Rockets on October 24, 2019. On November 25, Antetokounmpo scored a season-high 50 points, along with 14 rebounds, in a 122–118 win over the Utah Jazz. After a December 14 victory over Cleveland, Antetokounmpo had led the Bucks to their 18th consecutive victory, two shy of the franchise record. The winning streak ended on December 16 with a close loss to the Dallas Mavericks, despite Antetokounmpo recording an efficient 48 points and 14 rebounds. On December 19, Antetokounmpo made a career-high five three-pointers to lead Milwaukee over the Western Conference top seed, the Lakers and helped the Bucks claim the NBA's best record at 25–4. On January 23, 2020, Antetokounmpo was named an All-Star Game captain, alongside James, for the second consecutive year.

During the season postponement that lasted from early March to the end of July, due to the COVID-19 pandemic, Antetokounmpo claimed to not have a basketball hoop to practice with. He later clarified that he did have access to a gym and basketball hoop, explaining his earlier comments as a means to "get a little bit ahead of the competition." Antetokounmpo and the Bucks resumed their campaign against the Celtics on July 31, where Antetokounmpo led the Bucks to victory with 36 points and 15 rebounds. Although the Bucks finished the seeding games with a 3–5 record, they had the best record in the NBA for the second consecutive year, finishing with a 56–17 record. On August 12, Antetokounmpo was suspended for one game without pay for headbutting Moritz Wagner during a game against the Wizards. During the playoffs, the Bucks advanced to the second round but lost 4–1 to the Miami Heat. In Game 2, the Heat's Jimmy Butler was fouled while shooting by Antetokounmpo as time expired, leading to Butler's game-winning walk-off free throws. Antetokounmpo missed most of Game 4 after re-injuring his right ankle which he twisted in Game 3. Milwaukee won the game, but Antetokounmpo was also out for Game 5, when the Bucks were eliminated.

On September 18, Antetokounmpo won his second consecutive MVP award. In doing so, he joined Hakeem Olajuwon and Michael Jordan as the only players to win MVP and NBA Defensive Player of the Year awards in the same season.

==== NBA championship and Finals MVP (2020–2021) ====
On December 15, 2020, Antetokounmpo re-signed with the Bucks, coming to terms on a five-year, $228 million extension, the largest in league history. At the 2021 All-Star Game, he played on the team captained by James and scored 35 points on a perfect 16-of-16 shooting from the field to lead the team to a 170–150 win and became the first non-American to win the All-Star Game MVP. The Bucks finished the 2020–21 season with a 46–26 record, clinching the third seed in the Eastern Conference. In the first round of the playoffs, they faced a rematch against Miami. In a stark reversal of their upset loss the prior year, Antetokounmpo led the Bucks to a four-game sweep, closing out the series with his first playoff triple-double in Game 4. Antetokounmpo also led the Bucks to a seven-game series win over the Brooklyn Nets in the conference semifinals, where he averaged 31.9 points, 12.9 rebounds, and 3.6 assists per game. On June 29, 2021, Antetokounmpo suffered an injury to his left knee during the third quarter of Game 4 of the Eastern Conference Finals against the Atlanta Hawks after slamming into Clint Capela and landing awkwardly, resulting in a gruesome hyperextension. Antetokounmpo exited the game, and the Bucks lost 110–88. MRI results would later show that he did not suffer any ligament tears. Antetokounmpo was ruled out for both Games 5 and 6 of the conference finals as a result of the knee injury. The series returned to Milwaukee at a 2–2 deadlock, yet the Bucks ended up winning both Games 5 and 6 in his absence, advancing to the NBA Finals for the first time in 47 years.

Antetokounmpo returned in time for the finals against the resurgent Phoenix Suns. In his Finals debut, he recorded 20 points and 17 rebounds in a 118–108 loss. He then registered back-to-back games with at least 40 points and 10 rebounds in a Game 2 loss and a Game 3 victory, joining Shaquille O'Neal in 2000 as the only players to reach those numbers in consecutive finals games. He also joined Jordan, O'Neal, and James as the only players to put up at least 40 points in back-to-back finals games in the previous 50 years. The Bucks continued their comeback after having lost the first two games of the series, prevailing in the next four contests. He made a crucial block on a Deandre Ayton alley-oop to preserve a lead late in Game 4, then scored an alley-oop in the final minute of Game 5 to extend a lead. In Game 6, Antetokounmpo recorded 50 points, 14 rebounds, and 5 blocks as the Bucks clinched their first championship in 50 years. He posted series averages of 35.2 points, 13.2 rebounds, 5.0 assists, 1.2 steals, and 1.8 blocks, and was subsequently named NBA Finals MVP by a unanimous vote. At 26 years, 226 days old, he is the youngest since Kawhi Leonard in 2014 to be named Finals MVP, as well as the first European since Dirk Nowitzki in 2011 to do so. Antetokounmpo also joined Michael Jordan and Hakeem Olajuwon as the only players to have won the MVP, Finals MVP, and Defensive Player of the Year awards during the span of their careers.

==== Coming up short (2021–2022) ====
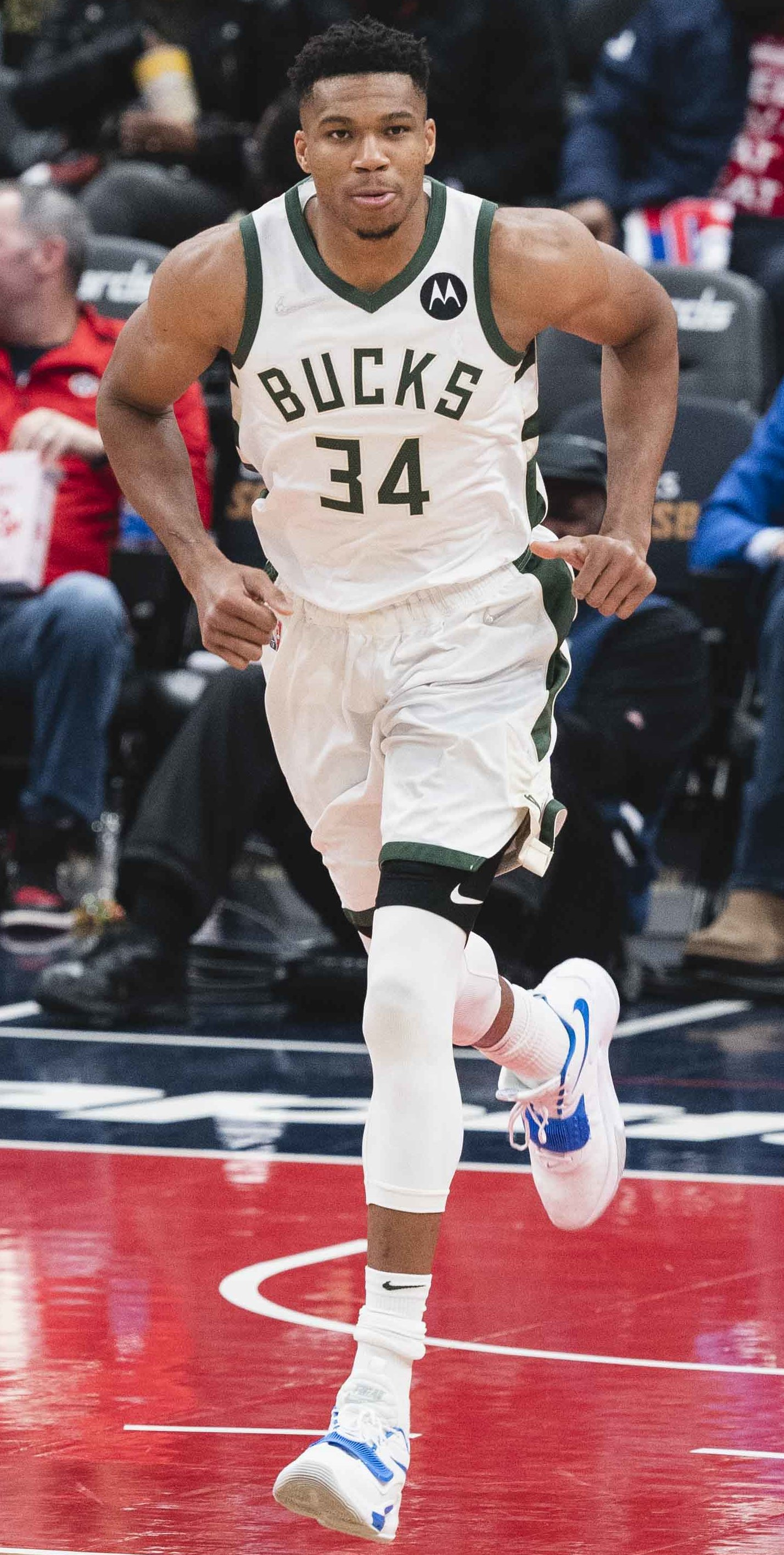
Antetokounmpo in a game in Washington D.C. against the Wizards in 2021

On October 19, 2021, after receiving his first NBA championship ring in the annual pre-game ceremony, Antetokounmpo recorded 32 points, 14 rebounds, and seven assists in a 127–104 season-opening win over the Nets. On January 13, 2022, he led the Bucks to a 118–99 win over the Golden State Warriors with 30 points, 12 rebounds, 11 assists, and 3 blocks, leading both teams in such stats, in less than thirty minutes, and became the first player to record multiple 30-point triple-doubles in 30 minutes; he tied Jordan's career mark of 28 triple-doubles, ranking 18th all-time. On February 6, in a 137–113 win over the Los Angeles Clippers, Antetokounmpo recorded 28 points, 10 rebounds, and five assists, as the Bucks became the first team in NBA history to see their entire starting lineup record at least 15 points, five rebounds, and two three-pointers in the same game. On February 8, in a 131–116 win against the Lakers, Antetokounmpo scored 44 points with 14 rebounds, 8 assists, 2 blocks, and 0 turnovers on 17-of-20 shooting from the field; it was his 20th straight game recording at least 25 points. On February 15, Antetokounmpo scored a season-high 50 points and grabbed 14 rebounds on 17-of-21 shooting from the field in a 128–119 win against the Indiana Pacers; it marked only the 12th time in NBA history that a player has scored 50 or more points on 80% shooting or better. On March 29, he scored 40 points, grabbed 14 rebounds, delivered six assists, and had a game-deciding block on Joel Embiid in the final seconds to lead the Bucks to a 118–116 victory over the Philadelphia 76ers. The following game, Antetokounmpo scored 44 points, grabbed 14 rebounds, and dished out 6 assists in a 120–119 overtime win over the Nets. He passed Abdul-Jabbar to become the career-leading scorer in Bucks franchise history. Antetokounmpo's record-setting three-pointer forced overtime, and he made two free throws in the final seconds to seal the victory for the Bucks. Antetokounmpo finished the regular season with a then-career-high 29.9 points, 11.6 rebounds, and 5.8 assists to become the first player in NBA history to average 25 points or more, 10-plus rebounds, and five assists or more in four separate seasons.

On April 20, during Game 2 of the first round of the playoffs, Antetokounmpo had 33 points, 18 rebounds, 9 assists, and 2 blocks in a 114–110 loss against the Chicago Bulls. He surpassed Abdul-Jabbar for the most playoff points in franchise history. On May 1, in Game 1 of the Eastern Conference Semifinals, Antetokounmpo recorded his second career playoff triple-double with 24 points, 13 rebounds, and 12 assists in a 101–89 win over the Boston Celtics. He became the first player in franchise history with multiple career playoff triple-doubles On May 13, Antetokounmpo posted 44 points, 20 rebounds, and 6 assists in a 108–95 Game 6 loss. He joined Shaquille O'Neal and Wilt Chamberlain as the only players in NBA playoff history to post a 40/20/5 game. The Bucks lost to Celtics in Game 7 despite Antetokounmpo's 25-point, 20-rebound, and 9-assist outing. He became the first player in NBA history to have 200 points, 100 rebounds, and 50 assists in a playoff series, averaging 33.9 points, 14.7 rebounds, and 7.1 assists against Boston. Antetokounmpo also finished the postseason by averaging 31.7 points, 14.2 rebounds and 6.8 assists across the 12 playoff games his Milwaukee Bucks played. He is therefore the first player in NBA history to average a 31-14-6 line across an entire postseason.

On May 21, Antetokounmpo was selected to his fourth consecutive All-Defensive First Team, which was the fifth career all-defensive team selection for him. It tied him with Hall of Famer and former two-time NBA Defensive Player of the Year Award winner Sidney Moncrief for most selections in franchise history. On May 24, Antetokounmpo was selected to his fourth consecutive All-NBA First Team and sixth consecutive overall. He became the first player in club history to earn six All-NBA team honors, passing Abdul-Jabbar and Moncrief for the most in franchise history.

==== Playoff upset (2022–2023) ====
On October 22, in the second game of the 2022–23 season, Antetokounmpo recorded 44 points and 12 rebounds on 17-of-21 shooting from the field, playing less than 28 minutes in a 125–105 win over the Rockets, marking just the fifth time in NBA history a player had scored at least 44 points while playing less than 28 minutes. He went 8 of 13 from the foul line to increase his total to 3,508 free throws, eclipsing Moncrief, who made 3,505 free throws with the Bucks, to become the franchise career free throws leader. In the very next game, Antetokounmpo had 43 points, 14 rebounds, 5 assists and 3 blocks in a 110–99 win against the Nets; 34 of his points came in the second half as the Bucks turned a 12-point deficit at halftime into an 11-point victory. On November 4, Antetokounmpo recorded his 30th career triple-double with 26 points, 14 rebounds and 11 assists in a 115–102 win over the Minnesota Timberwolves to improve to 8–0, the best start to a season in franchise history. On December 28, Antetokounmpo scored 45 points, grabbed a career-high 22 rebounds and delivered 7 assists in an 119–113 overtime loss to Chicago. The next game, Antetokounmpo had 43 points along with 20 rebounds and 5 assists in a 123–114 win over Minnesota. He joined Wilt Chamberlain and Elgin Baylor as the only players in NBA history with back-to-back games of at least 40 points, 20 rebounds, and 5 assists. Antetokounmpo also became just the seventh player with multiple games of 40 points, 20 rebounds, 5 assists, and 60% shooting. Since the ABA–NBA merger in 1976–77 season, Charles Barkley and Antetokounmpo are the only players to do this multiple times.

On January 3, 2023, Antetokounmpo recorded a then career-high 55 points, alongside 10 rebounds and seven assists in a 123–113 win over the Wizards. The next night, Antetokounmpo posted his 31st career triple-double with 30 points, 21 rebounds and 10 assists in a 104–101 overtime win against the Toronto Raptors. He tied John Havlicek and Draymond Green for 15th place on the NBA's all-time triple-double list. Antetokounmpo also became the first player to total at least 200 points, 80 rebounds, and 30 assists over a five-game span since Kareem Abdul-Jabbar in 1972. On January 23, Antetokounmpo was named the Eastern Conference captain for the All-Star Game, which marked his seventh overall selection. On January 29, Antetokounmpo had 50 points and 13 rebounds while playing only 30 minutes in a 135–110 win over New Orleans Pelicans. He shot 20-of-26 from the field, 3-of-4 from three, 7-of-12 from the free throw line. This marked the 10th time this season that Antetokounmpo has scored at least 40 points, matching the career high he set last year for 40-point games in a single season. On February 2, Antetokounmpo scored 20 of his 54 points in the fourth quarter, along with 19 rebounds, and Milwaukee overcame a 21-point deficit to beat the Los Angeles Clippers 106–105 for their sixth consecutive victory. He joined Abdul-Jabbar as the only players in Bucks history to have at least three 50-point games in a season. The next game, Antetokounmpo logged his 32nd career triple-double with 35 points, 15 rebounds and 11 assists in a 123–115 win over the Miami Heat. On February 16, Antetokounmpo surpassed Paul Pressey for the most assists in franchise history. On February 19, his team won the All-Star Game 184–175, defeating Team LeBron. The win marked Team Giannis' first (and only) win in an NBA All-Star Game, having previously lost in 2019 and 2020. On March 19, Antetokounmpo had his 33rd career triple-double, making all nine of his field goal attempts. He recorded 22 points, 13 rebounds and 10 assists in a 118–111 win over the Toronto Raptors. He also played in his franchise-record 712th game, surpassing Junior Bridgeman. On March 29, Antetokounmpo had 38 points, 17 rebounds and 12 assists in a 149–136 victory over the Indiana Pacers. On April 9, Antetokounmpo finished the regular season with a career-high 31.1 points per game and he also led the Bucks to a league-best 58–24 record. Antetokounmpo also became just the second player in NBA history (Kareem Abdul-Jabbar is the other) to average 30 points or more, 10-plus rebounds and 5-plus assists while shooting at least 55% from the field.

In the first round of the 2023 NBA playoffs, Antetokounmpo and the Bucks faced the Miami Heat. In Game 1, Antetokounmpo suffered a lower back contusion that ruled him out for the remainder of Game 1, and the next two games. He returned in Game 4, scoring a triple-double of 26 points, 10 rebounds and 13 assists in a losing effort. The Bucks were eliminated in five games, despite Antetokounmpo's 38-point, 20-rebound outing in a 128–126 closeout overtime loss in Game 5.

==== Franchise records, NBA Cup and NBA Cup MVP (2023–2026) ====
On October 23, 2023, Antetokounmpo signed a three-year, $186 million extension with the Bucks. On November 9, Antetokounmpo scored 54 points and put up 12 rebounds in a 126–124 loss to the Indiana Pacers. He also joined Michael Jordan as the only players since the ABA–NBA merger to have at least eight 50-point and 10-rebound games in their career. On November 18, Antetokounmpo recorded 40 points, 15 rebounds and 7 assists in a 132–125 win over the Mavericks. He became the youngest player (28 years, 347 days) with at least 16,000 points, 7,000 rebounds, and 3,000 assists in an NBA career. On November 20, Antetokounmpo had 42 points, 13 rebounds, and eight assists in a 142–129 win over the Wizards. He also tied Kareem Abdul-Jabbar for the most games with at least 30 points, 10 rebounds, and five assists in Bucks history. On December 13, Antetokounmpo scored a career-high and Bucks-record 64 points and grabbed 14 rebounds in a 140–126 victory over Indiana. He became the first player since Shaquille O'Neal in 2000 to score at least 60 points without a made three-point basket. Antetokounmpo is also the first player in NBA history to make at least 20 field goals and 20 free throws while shooting both at 70% or higher. On December 17, Antetokounmpo scored 26 points and 17 rebounds in a 128–119 win over the Houston Rockets. He also surpassed Abdul-Jabbar to become the all-time rebounds leader in Bucks history. On December 19, Antetokounmpo had a then-career-high 16 assists, 14 rebounds and 11 points for his 37th career triple-double in a 132–119 win over the San Antonio Spurs.

On January 24, 2024, Antetokounmpo recorded his 42nd career triple-double with 35 points, 18 rebounds, 10 assists and 2 blocks in a 126–116 win over the Cleveland Cavaliers. On January 25, he was named the Eastern Conference captain for the NBA All-Star Game, marking his eight consecutive selection and fourth as the captain. On March 26, he posted his 44th career triple-double with 29 points, a season-high 21 rebounds, 11 assists and 3 blocks in a 128–124 double overtime loss against the Los Angeles Lakers. On April 9, Antetokounmpo suffered a calf injury, and missed the remainder of the regular season and the NBA playoffs.

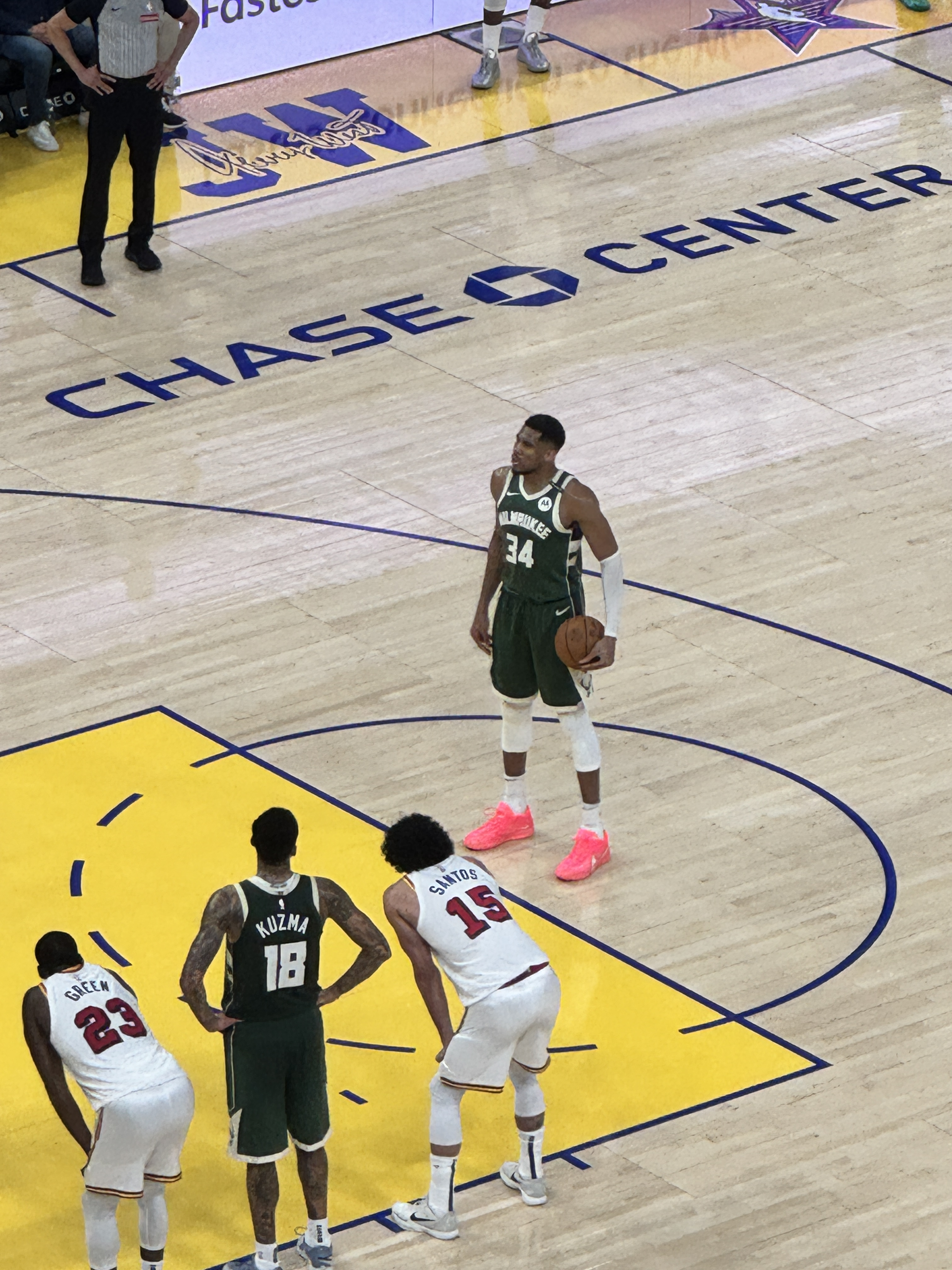
Antetokounmpo with the Bucks in March 2025

On November 13, Antetokounmpo recorded 59 points, 14 rebounds and seven assists in a 127–120 overtime win over the Detroit Pistons. On November 30, he had his third triple-double in six games with 42 points, 12 rebounds and 11 assists in a 124–114 win over the Washington Wizards. On December 17, Antetokounmpo and the Bucks won the NBA Cup with a 97–81 victory over the Oklahoma City Thunder, with Antetokounmpo receiving the tournament MVP award and being selected to the All-Tournament team. He posted a triple-double with 26 points, 19 rebounds and 10 assists.

On January 2, 2025, Antetokounmpo put up 27 points on 12-of-24 shooting from the field, 13 rebounds, seven assists and three blocks in a 113–110 loss to the Brooklyn Nets. It was his 26th straight game with at least 20 points scored on 50% or better shooting from the field, the longest streak in NBA history. On January 8, Antetokounmpo put up 25 points, 16 rebounds, and eight assists in a 121–105 win over the San Antonio Spurs. It was his 432nd career double-double, surpassing Abdul-Jabbar for the most in franchise history. On January 25, 2025, Antetokounmpo was named a starter for the All-Star Game, marking his ninth consecutive selection. He was also the leading vote-getter for the All-Star Game. He was named the Eastern Conference Player of the Month for January, the eleventh monthly award in his career. On March 5, Antetokounmpo put up 32 points and 15 rebounds in a 137–107 win over the Dallas Mavericks. He reached 20,000 career points in that game.

On April 3, Antetokounmpo recorded 35 points, 17 rebounds and a career-high 20 assists in a 126–113 win over the Philadelphia 76ers. He became the first player in NBA history to post 35 points, 15 rebounds and 20 assists in a single game. On April 5, Antetokounmpo posted his second straight triple-double with 36 points, 15 rebounds and 10 assists in a 121–115 overtime win over the Miami Heat. He became the first player in NBA history to have 70 points, 30 rebounds, and 30 assists over any two-game span since Wilt Chamberlain in 1968. On April 10, Antetokounmpo became just the second player in NBA history after Chamberlain to have ten straight games scoring at least 20 points while shooting at least 60 percent from the floor. Antetokounmpo finished the regular season averaging 30.4 points, 11.9 rebounds and 6.5 assists per game in 67 contests. He averaged 30+ points, 10+ rebounds and 5+ assists for the third time in his career, passing Chamberlain and Oscar Robertson for the most such seasons in NBA history.

In the playoffs, the Bucks were eliminated in the first round despite Antetokounmpo averaging playoff career-highs in points per game (33.0), rebounds per game (15.4) and field goal percentage (.606 FG%). In the close-out Game 5, he recorded 30 points, 20 rebounds, 13 assists, two steals and two blocks in a 119–118 overtime loss against the Indiana Pacers. Antetokounmpo became the fourth player in NBA playoff history to record a 30/20/10 game and the first to record a 30/20/10/2/2 game.

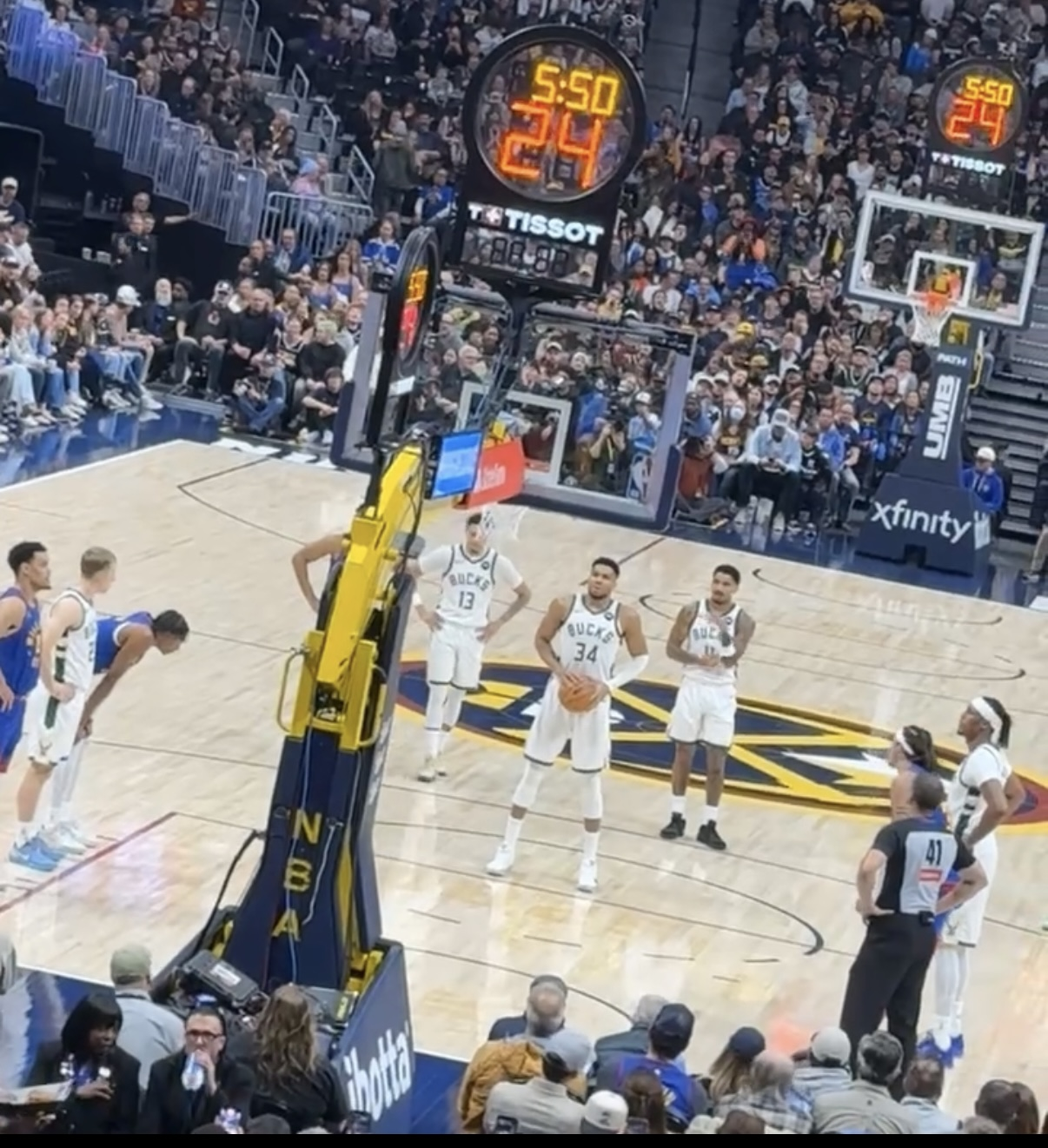
Antetokounmpo in January 2026, during his final season with the Bucks

On November 3, 2025, Antetokounmpo recorded 33 points, 13 rebounds, 5 assists, and hit a buzzer-beater to lift the Bucks over the Pacers 117–115. On November 8, Antetokounmpo posted 41 points (including 19 in the fourth quarter), 15 rebounds, and 9 assists, leading the Bucks to a 126–110 win over the Chicago Bulls. With this performance, he became the Bucks’ all-time leader in 40-point games, surpassing Abdul-Jabbar with 56 such games. The game also marked his 10th career game with at least 40 points, 15 rebounds, and 5 assists, joining Chamberlain, Elgin Baylor, and Abdul-Jabbar as the only players in NBA history to reach that stat line 10 or more times. Milwaukee missed the playoffs, snapping a nine-year postseason appearance streak. Antetokounmpo played a career-low 36 regular-season games due to lingering calf and knee injuries.

=== Miami Heat (2026–present) ===
On July 6, 2026, Antetokounmpo, alongside Bobby Portis, was traded to the Miami Heat in exchange for Tyler Herro, Kel'el Ware, Jaime Jaquez Jr., Kasparas Jakučionis, the rights to Nate Ament and four more future draft picks.

On October 21, Antetokounmpo made his Heat debut, scoring 35 points in a 131–106 loss to the Minnesota Timberwolves. His 35 points surpassed the previous record set by LeBron James for the most points scored in a debut in Heat franchise history. On October 26, he recorded his first triple-double with the Heat with 29 points, 15 rebounds, and 11 assists in a 113–109 loss to the Dallas Mavericks. Two days later, in his first win with the Heat, Antetokounmpo recorded 24 points and 18 rebounds in a 129–117 victory over the Atlanta Hawks. On November 13, Antetokounmpo scored 37 points and grabbed nine rebounds in a 133–121 victory over the Cleveland Cavaliers. Alongside Bam Adebayo, he became part of only the second pair of Heat teammates to score at least 37 points each in the same game, following Dwyane Wade and LeBron James in 2013.

== National team career ==
=== Junior national team ===
Antetokounmpo represented Greece for the first time in July 2013 with the Greek Under-20 national team at the 2013 FIBA Europe Under-20 Championship. He helped Greece to an 8–2 record and a fifth-place overall finish while averaging 8.0 points, 7.6 rebounds, and 2.2 assists across the 10 games. He finished the tournament ranked second in defensive rebounds (7.0) and seventh in blocked shots (1.4).

=== Senior national team ===
Antetokounmpo played for the senior men's Greek national basketball team beginning in 2014, helping Greece finish ninth overall in the 2014 FIBA Basketball World Cup with a 5–1 record. He averaged 6.3 points and 4.3 rebounds across the six games while shooting 45.8% from the field.

Antetokounmpo again joined the Greek national team for EuroBasket 2015. Greece's roster consisted of many experienced players, most of them previously crowned European champions with their clubs, like Vassilis Spanoulis, Ioannis Bourousis, and Nikos Zisis, and Greece was a favorite for a medal, after showing great form in friendly games. At the tournament, Greece was unbeaten in the group stages, and reached the quarter-finals, where they lost a close game to the eventual champions, Spain. Greece finished fifth with a 7–1 record. Antetokounmpo finished the tournament with three double-doubles, and a career-high 17 rebounds against Spain, leading his team in rebounds for the tournament. In eight games, he averaged 9.8 points, 6.9 rebounds and 1.1 assists per game.

Antetokounmpo also played with Greece at the 2016 FIBA World Olympic Qualifying Tournament, where he averaged 15.3 points, 5.7 rebounds, 2.0 assists, 0.7 steals, and 2.0 blocks per game in three games. Greece failed to qualify for the 2016 Summer Olympics, after being eliminated by Croatia, by a score of 66–61. He also played with Greece during their preparation phase for the EuroBasket 2017. He scored 20 points in a warmup game against Montenegro. However, he missed the actual EuroBasket tournament, due to a knee injury.

Antetokounmpo represented Greece at the 2019 FIBA Basketball World Cup, where he became the first reigning NBA MVP to play in a World Cup. He averaged 14.8 points, 8.8 rebounds, 2.4 assists, 2.4 steals, and 0.6 blocks per game in five games. Greece finished 11th in the tournament after they failed to advance past the second round, which was regarded as a disappointing result in national and international sports media.

He rejoined the team in August 2022. On August 25, 2022, Antetokounmpo scored a national team career-high 40 points, along with 8 rebounds and 5 assists, in an overtime loss to Serbia in the 2023 World Cup qualifiers. In September, Antetokounmpo played in the EuroBasket 2022, his second such tournament. On September 6, Antetokounmpo scored 41 points in a 99–79 group stage win over Ukraine. This was the twelfth-highest points tally of all time, and the most points scored in a EuroBasket game since Dirk Nowitzki in 2001. Greece was eliminated by Germany in the quarter-finals, in a game in which Antetokounmpo had 31 points, 7 rebounds and 8 assists but was ejected after two unsportsmanlike fouls. He averaged 29.3 points, 8.8 rebounds, 4.7 assists, 1.5 steals and 0.8 blocks per game in 6 games played, while shooting 56.6% from the field. Antetokounmpo finished the tournament as the leading scorer and was selected to the All-Tournament Team.

At the 2024 Summer Olympics, he carried the Greek flag at the opening ceremony. He then played in group stage against Canada, Spain, and Australia, eventually finishing third with a 1–2 record. Greece was eliminated by Germany in the quarter-finals, in a game in which Antetokounmpo scored 22 points. He averaged a tournament-high 25.8 points along with 6.3 rebounds, 3.5 assists in 4 games played, while shooting 67.8% from the field. For his performances, Antetokounmpo was named to the tournament's All-Second Team.

At EuroBasket 2025, Antetokounmpo captained Greece again and led them to a bronze medal, the first medal for the country since 2009. In the third-place game against Finland, he had 30 points, 17 rebounds, 6 assists and 2 blocks on 9-of-11 shooting from the field. Following the game he declared that "We did it, this is probably the greatest accomplishment I have ever accomplished as an athlete". He was named to the All-Star Five of the tournament, as he was the second leading scorer with 27.3 points as well as 10.6 rebounds and 4.1 assists on average.

From 2014 to 2025, Antetokounmpo played with the senior men's Greek national team in 44 official games in major FIBA tournaments. In those specific games, he has scored a total of 902 points, for a scoring average of 20.5 points per game.

== Player profile ==
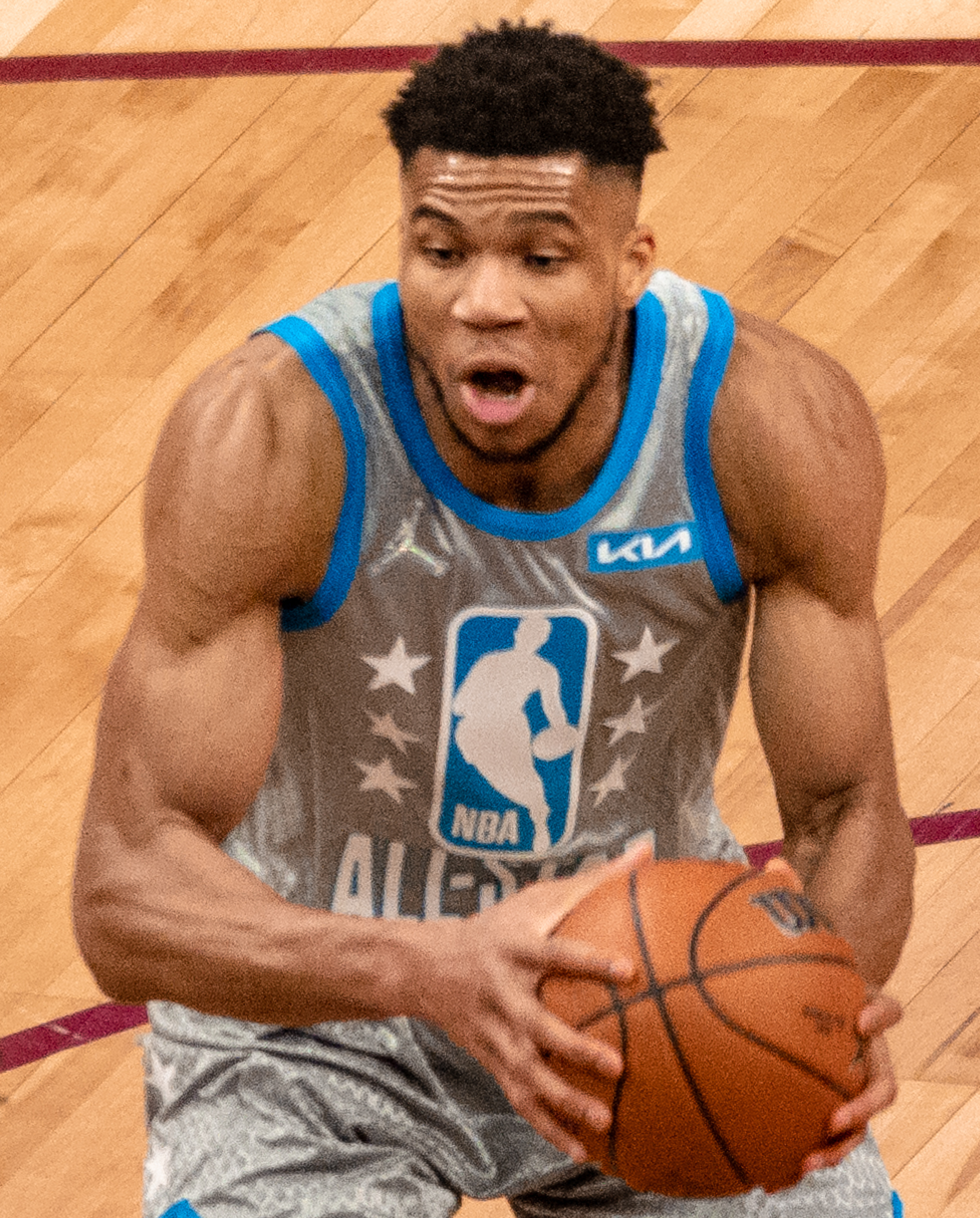
Antetokounmpo during the 2022 NBA All-Star Game

Standing 6 feet 11 inches (2.11 m) tall and weighing 250 pounds (113 kg), Antetokounmpo is officially listed as a forward and sometimes described as a point forward, but has been deployed across all five positions. Highly athletic and versatile, Antetokounmpo is often recognized as one of the best all-around players in the NBA, and many analysts have declared him "positionless" and as embodying the future of the league.

=== Offense ===
By the 2016–17 season, Antetokounmpo had established himself as one of the league's most devastating slashers and transition scorers. His rare combination of size and speed frequently enables him to cross half a court in a single dribble and blow past multiple defenders. A 2017 analysis conducted by Stats SportVU at the behest of FiveThirtyEight showed that Antetokounmpo was able to cover slightly more than 15 feet off a single dribble when driving to the basket, 5 feet further than the average player in the league. In addition, Antetokounmpo has developed his own version of the Euro step, described by Jordan Brenner of ESPN.com as "the final phase of the move's evolution", which allows him to directly attack the rim from the three-point arc in a move that "renders the area between the top of the key and the basket all but undefendable".

However, Antetokounmpo has been criticized for his lack of a reliable jump shot, having shot above 31% from three-point range just once in his career. Antetokounmpo's jumper has been exploited by other teams. Most famously, the Toronto Raptors built a 'wall' of lengthy, adept defenders to neutralise Antetokounmpo's paint dominance in their 2019 conference finals victory. As a result, Antetokounmpo increased his jump-shooting output, averaging a career-high 4.7 three-point goals attempted and 1.4 made per game in 2019–20.

Antetokounmpo has also received attention for his playmaking skills. Despite not being the primary ball handler of the Bucks, he has largely orchestrated the team's offense. During the 2019–20 season, Antetokounmpo was responsible (through assisting and personally scoring) for 57.8% of the points the Bucks scored while he was on the floor, one of the highest rates in the league. He averaged 6.5 assists per game during both the 2023–24 and 2024–25 seasons.

=== Defense ===
Antetokounmpo is also recognized as an elite defensive player, capable of guarding all five positions but more often deployed in a "free safety" role that allows him to roam the paint and discourage attacks on the rim. He is also a proficient shot-blocker and has developed a reputation for blocking opponents in transition (the chase-down block). With Antetokounmpo in this role, the Bucks flourished into one of the league's best defensive teams, leading the NBA in defensive rating in 2018–19 and 2019–20. For his defensive efforts, Antetokounmpo won the 2020 NBA Defensive Player of the Year, and he has become a perennial NBA All-Defensive honoree.

== Awards and honors ==
NBA honors

- NBA Champion: 2021
- NBA Finals MVP: 2021
- 2× NBA Most Valuable Player: 2019, 2020
- NBA Cup Champion: 2024
- NBA Cup MVP: 2024
- 2× NBA Cup All-Tournament Team:
  - All-Tournament Team 2023,
  - All-Tournament Team 2024
- NBA Defensive Player of the Year: 2020
- 10× NBA All-Star: 2017, 2018, 2019, 2020, 2021, 2022, 2023, 2024, 2025, 2026
- NBA All-Star Game MVP: 2021
- 4× NBA All-Star Captain: 2019, 2020, 2023, 2024
- NBA Most Improved Player: 2017
- 9× All-NBA Selection:
  - All-NBA First Team: 2019, 2020, 2021, 2022, 2023, 2024, 2025
  - All-NBA Second Team: 2017, 2018
- 5× All-Defensive Selection:
  - NBA All-Defensive First Team: 2019, 2020, 2021, 2022
  - NBA All-Defensive Second Team: 2017
- NBA All-Rookie Second Team: 2014
- Magic Johnson Award: 2023
- 2020 NBA Bubble All-Seeding Games Second Team (2020)
- NBA 75th Anniversary Team: 2021
- All-Time NBA European First Team:

Greek basketball

- FIBA All Second Team Selection: Men's Basketball Tournament Paris Olympics 2024
- Best Greek Male Athlete 2020, 2021
- FIBA Olympic Qualifying Tournament: Tissot MVP 2024
- Flag Bearer for Greece 2024 Paris Olympics
- 2× EuroBasket All-Tournament Team: 2022, 2025

European honors

- Euroscar European Player of the Year: 2018
- All-European Player of the Year: 2018
- 10x All-European Selection:
  - All-European First Team: 2015, 2016, 2017, 2018, 2019, 2020, 2021, 2022, 2023, 2024
- 6x All-European Small Forward of the Year 2015, 2016, 2017, 2018, 2019, 2020
- 4x All-European Power Forward of the Year 2021,2022, 2023, 2024

Media

- Time 100: 2021
- PBWA Magic Johnson Award: 2022–23
- Best Male Athlete ESPY Award: 2019
- Best NBA Player ESPY Award: 2019
- BET Awards for Sportsman of the Year nominee: 2020, 2022
- Forbes List of the World's Top-10 Highest Paid Athlete: 2022, 2024

== Records ==
- Only player in NBA history to finish a regular season in the top 20 in all five statistics of total points, rebounds, assists, steals and blocks.
- Only player in NBA history to average at least 25 points, 10 rebounds, 5 assists, 1 steal, and 1 block in multiple seasons.
- Only player in NBA history to average at least 30 points and 60 percent field goal percentage in a season.
- Only player in NBA history to record a 35+ point, 15+ rebound and 20+ assist game.
- Only non-American player in NBA history to win the All-Star Game MVP.
- Only player in NBA history to have 200 points, 100 rebounds and 50 assists in a playoff series.
- Only player in NBA history to average at least 31 points, 14 rebounds and 6 assists in a single postseason.
- Highest scoring close-out Finals game in NBA history (50 points): Milwaukee Bucks, 2020–21
  - Tied with Bob Petit (St. Louis Hawks, 1957–58)
- Second NBA player to average at least 30 points, 10 rebounds, 5 assists on 55% field goal percentage in a single season: Milwaukee Bucks, 2022–23
  - Also achieved by Kareem Abdul-Jabbar (Milwaukee Bucks, 1972–73)
- Third NBA player to win MVP and Defensive Player of the Year awards in the same season: Milwaukee Bucks, 2019–20
  - Also achieved by Michael Jordan (Chicago Bulls, 1987–88), and Hakeem Olajuwon (Houston Rockets, 1993–94)
- Third NBA player to post a 40 points, 20 rebounds and 5 assists game in the playoffs: Milwaukee Bucks, 2021–22
  - Also achieved by Wilt Chamberlain (Philadelphia Warriors, 1961–62) and (Philadelphia 76ers, 1966–67), and Shaquille O'Neal (Los Angeles Lakers, 2000–01)
- Fourth NBA player since the NBA-ABA merger to post 30 points, 20 rebounds and 10 assists in a game: Milwaukee Bucks, 2022–23
  - Also achieved by David Lee (New York Knicks, 2009–10), DeMarcus Cousins (New Orleans Pelicans, 2017–18), and Nikola Jokić (Denver Nuggets, 2019–20 and 2022–23)
- Fifth NBA player to lead his team in all five major statistics (points, rebounds, assists, steals, blocks) in the same season: Milwaukee Bucks, 2016–17
  - Also achieved by Dave Cowens (Boston Celtics, 1977–78), Scottie Pippen (Chicago Bulls, 1994–95), Kevin Garnett (Minnesota Timberwolves, 2002–03) LeBron James (Cleveland Cavaliers, 2008–09), and Nikola Jokić (Denver Nuggets, 2021–22)
- Most points scored in a game without converting a three-point field goal since they became an official NBA statistic: (64) Milwaukee Bucks, 2023–24

== Career statistics ==
Legend
GP	Games played	GS	Games started	MPG	Minutes per game
FG%	Field goal percentage	3P%	3-point field goal percentage	FT%	Free throw percentage
RPG	Rebounds per game	APG	Assists per game	SPG	Steals per game
BPG	Blocks per game	PPG	Points per game	**Bold**	Career high
†	Won an NBA championship	‡	NBA record

=== NBA ===
==== Regular season ====
Year	Team	GP	GS	MPG	FG%	3P%	FT%	RPG	APG	SPG	BPG	PPG
2013–14	Milwaukee	77	23	24.6	.414	**.347**	.683	4.4	1.9	.8	.8	6.8
2014–15	Milwaukee	**81**	71	31.4	.491	.159	.741	6.7	2.6	.9	1.0	12.7
2015–16	Milwaukee	80	79	35.3	.506	.257	.724	7.7	4.3	1.2	1.4	16.9
2016–17	Milwaukee	80	**80**	35.6	.522	.272	**.770**	8.7	5.4	**1.6**	**1.9**	22.9
2017–18	Milwaukee	75	75	**36.7**	.529	.307	.760	10.0	4.8	1.5	1.4	26.9
2018–19	Milwaukee	72	72	32.8	.578	.256	.729	12.5	5.9	1.3	1.5	27.7
2019–20	Milwaukee	63	63	30.4	.553	.304	.633	**13.6**	5.6	1.0	1.0	29.5
2020–21†	Milwaukee	61	61	33.0	.569	.303	.685	11.0	5.9	1.2	1.2	28.1
2021–22	Milwaukee	67	67	32.9	.553	.293	.722	11.6	5.8	1.1	1.4	29.9
2022–23	Milwaukee	63	63	32.1	.553	.275	.645	11.8	5.7	.8	.8	**31.1**
2023–24	Milwaukee	73	73	34.2	.611	.274	.657	11.5	**6.5**	1.2	1.1	30.4
2024–25	Milwaukee	67	67	35.2	.601	.222	.617	11.9	**6.5**	.9	1.2	30.4
2025–26	Milwaukee	36	36	28.9	**.624**	.333	.650	9.8	5.4	.9	.7	27.6
Career		895	830	32.7	.554	.285	.691	9.9	5.0	1.1	1.2	24.1
All-Star		8	8	25.3	.713	.273	.643	7.6	2.8	1.1	.8	24.9‡

==== Playoffs ====
Year	Team	GP	GS	MPG	FG%	3P%	FT%	RPG	APG	SPG	BPG	PPG
2015	Milwaukee	6	6	33.5	.366	.000	**.739**	7.0	2.7	.5	1.5	11.5
2017	Milwaukee	6	6	**40.5**	.536	**.400**	.543	9.5	4.0	**2.2**	1.7	24.8
2018	Milwaukee	7	7	40.0	.570	.286	.691	9.6	6.3	1.4	.9	25.7
2019	Milwaukee	15	15	34.3	.492	.327	.637	12.3	4.9	1.1	**2.0**	25.5
2020	Milwaukee	9	9	30.8	.559	.325	.580	13.8	5.7	.7	.9	26.7
2021†	Milwaukee	**21**	**21**	38.1	.569	.186	.587	12.8	5.1	1.0	1.2	30.2
2022	Milwaukee	12	12	37.3	.491	.220	.679	14.2	**6.8**	.7	1.3	31.7
2023	Milwaukee	3	3	30.5	.528	.000	.452	11.0	5.3	.3	.7	23.3
2025	Milwaukee	5	5	37.6	**.606**	.200	.698	**15.4**	6.6	1.0	1.0	**33.0**
Career		84	84	36.2	.532	.259	.625	12.2	5.3	1.0	1.3	27.0

== Business ventures ==
On August 20, 2021, Antetokounmpo became a minority owner of the Milwaukee Brewers of Major League Baseball. Antetokounmpo also holds a passion for soccer, being a boyhood supporter of English football club Arsenal FC. In March 2023, Giannis, along with his brothers, Alex, Thanasis, and Kostas, became minority owners in the Major League Soccer club Nashville SC. On October 28, 2026, the Milwaukee Brewers won the 2026 World Series with Giannis still as minority owner of the team.

In August 2022, Calamos Advisors announced that they would work with Antetokounmpo on an exchange-traded fund that invests in sustainable firms that would be called the Calamos Antetokounmpo Sustainable Equities Fund.

In September 2022, Antetokounmpo joined as an executive producer for National Geographic's documentary The Flagmakers, which focuses on the large population of immigrant employees working at an American flag factory. Antetokounmpo called the project inspiring, saying: "As an immigrant myself, I find this film incredibly personal and a deeply moving testament to those who call this country 'home'".

In June 2023, Giannis and his brothers Thanasis, Kostas and Alex expanded their investment portfolio, overseen by Ante Inc., by becoming shareholders and owners of the Canadian online confectionary retailer, Candy Funhouse.

In September 2023, Giannis signed on as an executive producer of a reality TV show created by Candy Funhouse and the producers of Big Brother, Fly on the Wall.

In February 2026, Antetokounmpo became a shareholder in Kalshi, a prediction betting website.

== Personal life ==
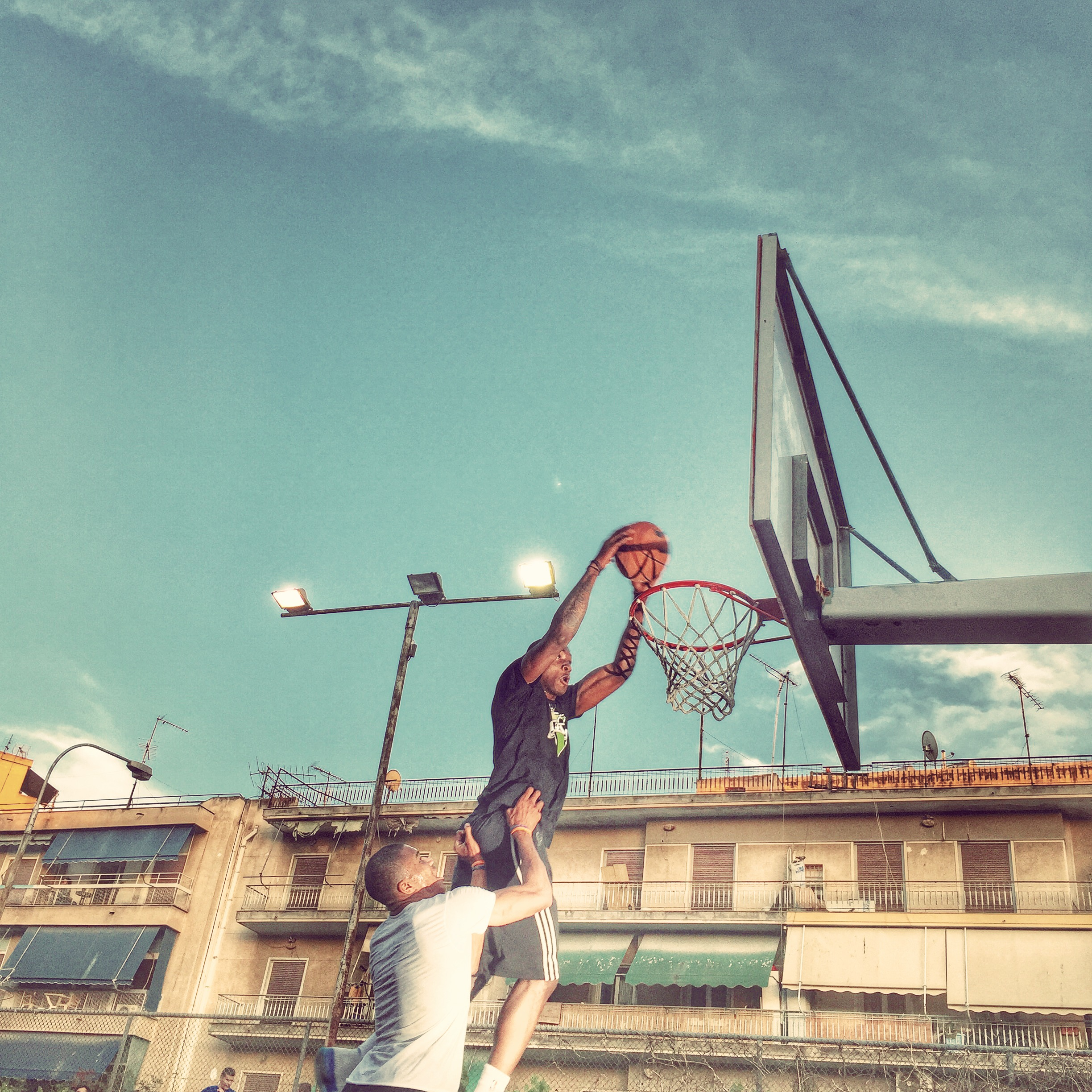
Giannis and Thanasis Antetokounmpo playing basketball at a local court in Sepolia, Athens, in 2015

Antetokounmpo's father, Charles, was a Nigerian football player, while his mother, Veronica, is a former high jumper. Charles died in September 2017, at age 54. Veronica gave each of her five sons both Greek and Nigerian names, choosing the Nigerian Ugo for Giannis. His parents are from different Nigerian ethnic groups—Charles was Yoruba while Veronica is Igbo. According to basketball great Hakeem Olajuwon, also Yoruba, the original family name of Adétòkunbọ̀ translates to "the crown has returned from overseas". Giannis wears the number 34 in honor of his parents, who were born in 1963 and 1964.

Antetokounmpo has two older brothers, Francis (Greek name Andreas) and Thanasis, as well as two younger brothers, Kostas and Alex.

Antetokounmpo is a Christian and was raised in the Greek Orthodox Church. He was baptized in the Greek Orthodox Church along with his brother Alex on October 28, 2012.

Following their son and brother, the entire Antetokounmpo family, except for Francis and Thanasis, moved from Athens to Milwaukee in early 2014. In July 2016, Giannis and Thanasis began their mandatory military service in Greece. The two brothers served a reduced three-month military service, as prescribed for Greek citizens who are permanent overseas residents.

Thanasis made his NBA debut with the New York Knicks after being drafted by the organization with the 51st overall pick in the 2014 NBA draft. After playing for Andorra during the 2016–17 season and the Greek EuroLeague powerhouse Panathinaikos for the next two seasons, he signed with the Milwaukee Bucks on July 16, 2019. Antetokounmpo's younger brother, Kostas, played college basketball for Dayton before being selected with the last pick in the 2018 NBA draft. He went on to win the 2020 NBA Championship with the Los Angeles Lakers. In 2021, Kostas signed with ASVEL Basket, part of the French Betclic Élite and the EuroLeague. Kostas currently plays for Olympiacos in Greece. Their youngest brother, Alex, played high school basketball in the US before becoming a professional basketball player.

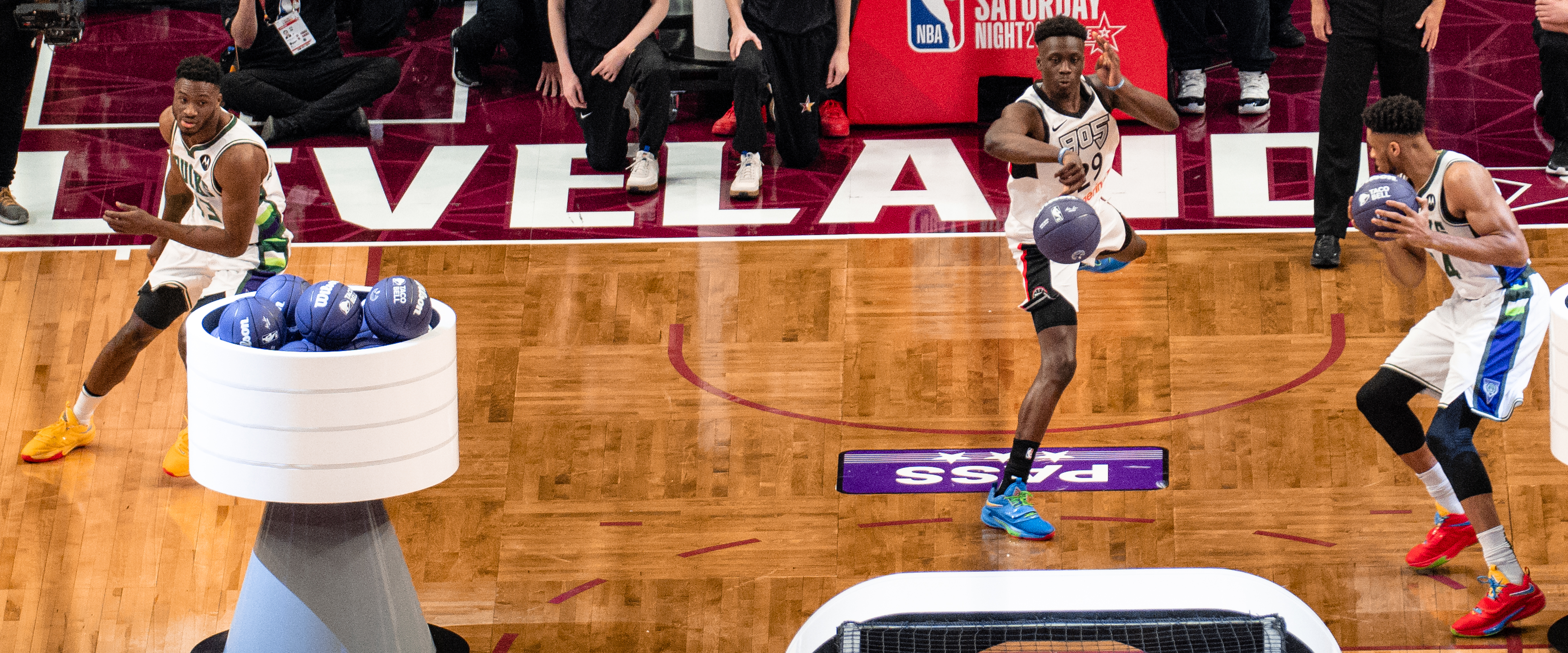
The Antetokounmpo brothers participating in the 2022 NBA All-Star Skills Challenge

In the mid-2010's, Antetokounmpo began dating Mariah Riddlesprigger, a native of Fresno, California. In February 2020, Riddlesprigger gave birth to their first son. She gave birth to their second son in August 2021, their first daughter in September 2023, and their second daughter in May 2025. Antetokounmpo and Riddlesprigger got married in a private ceremony on September 1, 2024, at the Costa Navarino resort near Pylos. Milwaukee Bucks teammate Khris Middleton served as his best man.

On March 13, 2020, Antetokounmpo and his family pledged to give $100,000 to the staff of the Fiserv Forum who were unable to work during the suspension of the 2019–20 NBA season because of the COVID-19 pandemic. Antetokounmpo and his family also donated 20,000 masks to people in Athens and Zografou in Greece in 2020.

== See also ==
- List of NBA career scoring leaders
- List of NBA franchise career scoring leaders
- List of NBA career turnovers leaders
- List of NBA career free throw scoring leaders
- List of NBA career field goal percentage leaders
- List of NBA career triple-double leaders
- List of NBA career playoff triple-double leaders
- List of NBA single-game scoring leaders
- List of NBA single-game playoff scoring leaders
- List of oldest and youngest NBA players
- List of European basketball players in the United States
- Milwaukee Bucks draft history

== Explanatory notes ==
Olympic Games
Preceded by Eleftherios Petrounias; Anna Korakaki	Flagbearer for Greece; París 2024; With: Antigoni Drisbioti	Succeeded by Incumbent
