= Thanasis Antetokounmpo =

Greek basketball player (born 1992)

Thanasis Antetokounmpo Θανάσης Αντετοκούνμπο
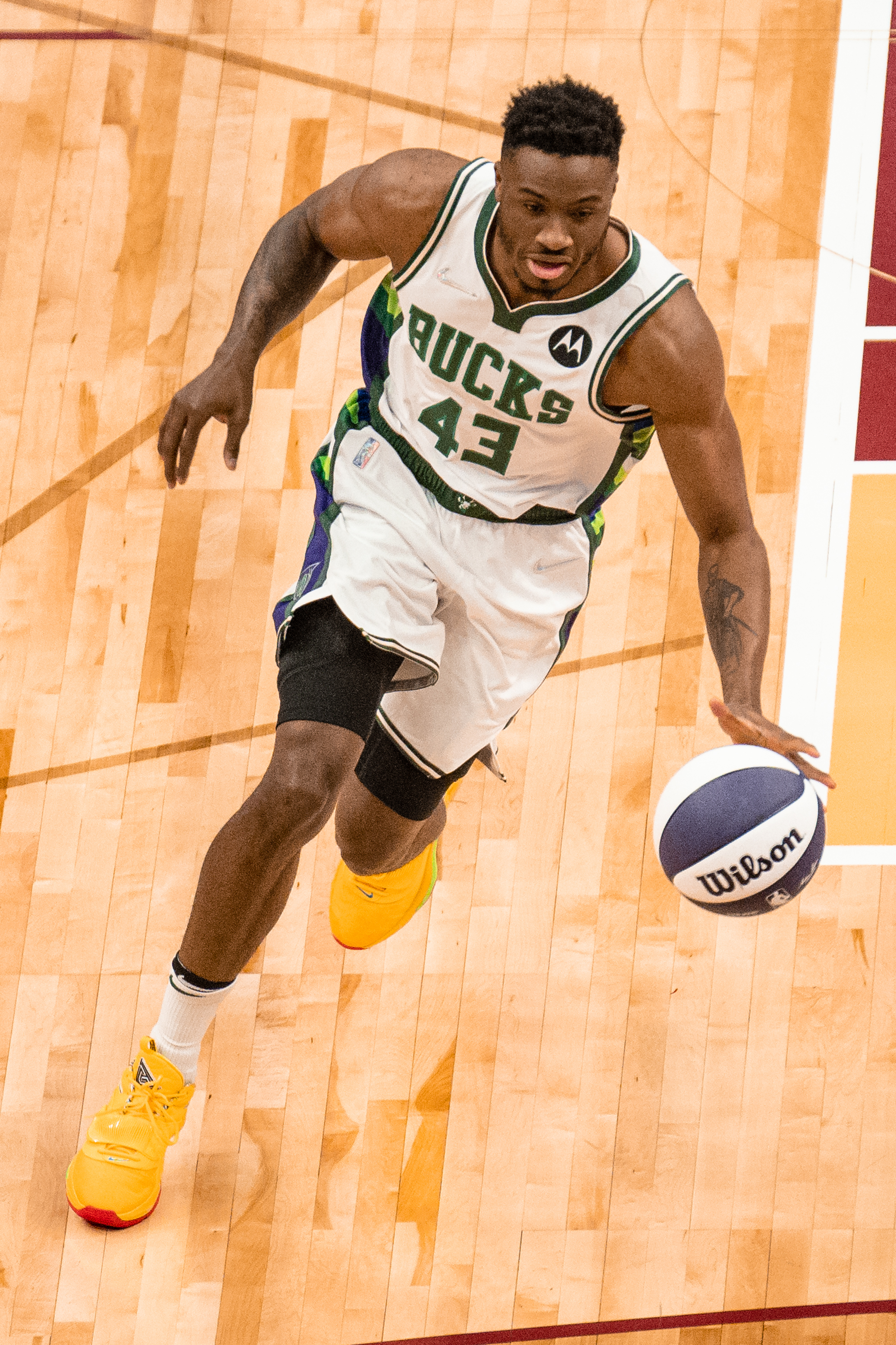
- Antetokounmpo at the 2022 NBA All-Star Weekend

No. 43 – Aris Thessaloniki
- Position: Power forward / small forward
- League: GBL; EuroCup

Personal information
- Born: July 18, 1992 (age 34) Athens, Attica, Greece
- Listed height: 6 ft 7 in (2.01 m)
- Listed weight: 219 lb (99 kg)

Career information
- NBA draft: 2014: 2nd round, 51st overall pick
- Drafted by: New York Knicks
- Playing career: 2011–present

Career history
- 2011–2013: Filathlitikos
- 2013–2014: Delaware 87ers
- 2014–2016: Westchester Knicks
- 2016: New York Knicks
- 2016–2017: Andorra
- 2017–2019: Panathinaikos
- 2019–2026: Milwaukee Bucks
- 2019: →Wisconsin Herd
- 2026–present: Aris Thessaloniki

Career highlights
- NBA champion (2021); 2× Greek League champion (2018, 2019); Greek Cup winner (2019); 2× Greek League Most Spectacular Player (2018, 2019); 2× Greek All-Star (2018, 2019); 2× Greek All-Star Game MVP (2018, 2019); NBA D-League All-Defensive Second Team (2015); NBA D-League All-Defensive Third Team (2014)
- Stats at NBA.com
- Stats at Basketball Reference
Medals
Men's basketball
Representing Greece
EuroBasket
Bronze medal – third place	2025 Cyprus–Finland–Poland–Latvia

Athanasios Rotimi "Thanasis" Antetokounmpo (Note: /ˌɑːntɛtəˈkuːmpoʊ/ AHN-tet-ə-KOOM-poh; Greek: Αθανάσιος Ροτίμι "Θανάσης" Αντετοκούνμπο, IPA: [θaˈnasis a(n)detoˈkumbo].) (born Adetokunbo, (Note: His official surname (Αντετοκούνμπο) is a Greek transcription of his parents' Yoruba language name Adétòkunbọ̀; in Greek, ‹ντ› is used for /d/, ‹ου› for /u/, and ‹μπ› for /b/. This is usually transliterated letter-for-letter back into the Latin alphabet as Antetokounmpo.) July 18, 1992) is a Greek professional basketball player for Aris Thessaloniki of the Greek Basketball League (GBL) and the EuroCup. At the international stage, he has represented the Greek national team since 2016.

Listed at 6 feet 7 inches, he plays at the small forward and power forward positions. He won back-to-back Greek League championships with Panathinaikos in 2018 and 2019 and the NBA championship with the Milwaukee Bucks in 2021.

He is the older brother of two-time NBA MVP Giannis Antetokounmpo as well as Kostas and Alex. Giannis and Alex are both former Bucks teammates of Thanasis, with all three playing on the same roster in the 2025-26 season.

== Early career ==
Antetokounmpo was born in Athens, Attica Region, Greece, the second of five boys born to his Nigerian parents Charles and Veronica Antetokounmpo. He began playing youth club basketball with the junior teams of Filathlitikos in 2008, and then played with the senior men's team of Filathlitikos in the semi-professional Greek fourth division (2010–11 season).

== Professional career ==
=== Filathlitikos (2011–2013) ===
In 2011, Antetokounmpo began his professional level career with Filathlitikos, of the Greek 3rd Division, after previously playing with the club in the Greek minor leagues. During the 2012–13 Greek 2nd Division season with Filathlitikos, he averaged 12.2 points, 4.9 rebounds, 1.0 assists, 1.1 steals, and 1.0 blocks per game. He was selected by the coaches to play in the 2013 Greek All-Star Game as a special participant, even though he was not actually selected as an all-star, and competed in the slam dunk contest as players from the second division are eligible to compete in the dunk competition.

After originally declaring for the 2013 NBA draft, he withdrew from the draft on June 17, 2013, along with 17 other players, on the day of the withdrawal deadline. He had originally entered the draft with his younger brother Giannis.

He played four games for Filathlitikos in the 2013–14 Greek A2 League season. In a round 2 game against Ermis Lagkada on October 19, 2013. He recorded 15 points, 8 rebounds, 1 assist and 1 steal in his team's 76–69 win.

=== Delaware 87ers (2013–2014) ===
On November 1, 2013, Antetokounmpo was selected by the Delaware 87ers with the ninth overall pick in the 2013 NBA Development League Draft. On November 23, 2013, in his D-League debut, Antetokounmpo recorded 14 points, 2 rebounds, and 2 assists, in a 117–106 loss to the Canton Charge. He also competed at the 2014 NBA D-League Slam Dunk Contest.

During the 2013–14 NBA Development League season, he averaged 12.0 points, 4.3 rebounds, 2.1 assists, 1.2 steals and 1.3 blocks in 50 games. On May 1, 2014, he was named to the 2014 NBA D-League All-Defensive third team.

=== Westchester Knicks (2014–2016) ===
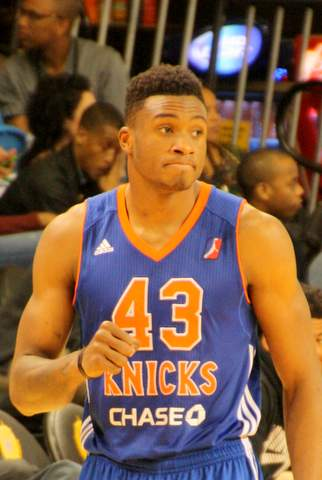
Antetokounmpo with the Westchester Knicks in January 2016

On June 26, 2014, Antetokounmpo was selected with the 51st overall pick in the 2014 NBA draft by the New York Knicks. He later joined the Knicks for the 2014 NBA Summer League where he averaged 3.0 points and 1.8 rebounds in five games. On November 3, 2014, he was acquired by the Westchester Knicks. On April 22, 2015, he was named to the 2015 NBA D-League All-Defensive second team. In 47 games for Westchester, he averaged 13.9 points, 6.2 rebounds, 1.7 assists, 1.7 steals, and 1.7 blocks per game.

In July 2015, Antetokounmpo re-joined the New York Knicks for the 2015 NBA Summer League where he averaged 6.4 points, 1.8 rebounds and 1.2 blocks in five games. On August 7, 2015, he signed with the Knicks, only to be waived by the team on October 23, after appearing in three preseason games. Later that month, he returned to the Westchester Knicks.

=== New York Knicks (2016) ===
On January 29, 2016, Antetokounmpo signed a 10-day contract with the New York Knicks. He made his NBA debut later that night, scoring two points in two minutes of action against the Phoenix Suns.

=== Return to Westchester (2016) ===
On February 8, 2016, New York decided not to renew Antetokounmpo's contract, and the following day, he returned to Westchester.

=== Andorra (2016–2017) ===
On August 8, 2016, Antetokounmpo signed with MoraBanc Andorra of the Liga ACB. He played an instrumental role as his team qualified for the first time in 22 years to the ACB playoffs, where they were eliminated in the quarterfinals by Real Madrid. He averaged 7.3 points and 3.8 rebounds per game during regular season, before raising his contribution to 12.7 points and 4.7 rebounds in the playoffs. The Spanish basketball magazine Gigantes del Basket awarded Antetokounmpo with their 2017 "Top 5 Trophy", which goes to the Liga ACB "Most Spectacular Player of the Year".

=== Panathinaikos (2017–2019) ===
On July 11, 2017, Antetokounmpo returned to Greece and signed a two-year deal with the EuroLeague giants Panathinaikos, of Greece's top-tier level Greek Basket League. He was named the MVP of the 2018 Greek All-Star Game. In June 2018, Antetokounmpo won the championship of the Greek League 2017–18 season with Panathinaikos, after beating Olympiacos in the league's finals, after a five-game series. He was named the Greek League's Most Spectacular Player, of the 2017–18 season.

On February 17, 2019, he won the Greek Cup's 2019 Grand Final, after Panathinaikos defeated PAOK, by a score of 79–73 in the title game, which was held in Heraklion Indoor Sports Arena, on Crete. On June 14, 2019, Antetokounmpo was crowned the Greek Basket League's 2018–19 season champion with Panathinaikos, for a second year in a row, after they swept Promitheas in the league's finals.

=== Milwaukee Bucks (2019–2026) ===
On July 16, 2019, Antetokounmpo signed with the Milwaukee Bucks, reuniting with his brother Giannis, also becoming the second pair of brothers on the Bucks roster, after twins Brook and Robin Lopez.

Before game 5 of the 2021 NBA Finals, Thanasis entered COVID-19 protocol. The Bucks won the Finals in six games, with Giannis winning NBA Finals Most Valuable Player award.

On August 13, 2021, Antetokounmpo re-signed with the Bucks on a two-year deal. On April 10, 2022, he recorded a career-high 27 points, alongside five rebounds, two assists and a block, in a 133–115 loss to the Cleveland Cavaliers.

On March 30, 2023, during a 140–99 loss to the Boston Celtics, Antetokounmpo engaged in an altercation with Celtics forward Blake Griffin. Antetokounmpo was ejected from the game after headbutting Griffin. Two days later, the NBA suspended Antetokounmpo for one game without pay due to the incident.

On July 28, 2023, Antetokounmpo re-signed a one-year deal with the Milwaukee Bucks. A clip of him performing a "Shammgod" move went viral on social media during a game against the Charlotte Hornets on February 10, 2024. He played in 34 games for Milwaukee during the 2023–24 NBA season, recording 32 total points on 16-for-30 shooting. On May 8, it was announced that Antetokounmpo would require surgery after suffering a torn Achilles tendon.

After missing the 2024–25 season with a torn Achilles, Antetokounmpo re-signed with the Bucks on a one-year contract on August 31, 2025. Later that year, his younger brother Alex signed a two-way contract with Milwaukee, marking the first time in NBA franchise history that three brothers–Giannis, Thanasis, and Alex–played on the same team.

=== Aris Thessaloniki (2026–present) ===
On 1 September 2026, Antetokounmpo signed with Aris Thessaloniki of the Greek Basketball League (GBL) and the EuroCup, teaming up with his brother Kostas.

== National team career ==
On May 3, 2016, Antetokounmpo was named in the senior men's Nigerian national team training camp preliminary list for the 2016 Rio Olympics. He declined the offer, choosing instead to play with the senior men's Greek national team. He was then selected to Greece's 12-man roster for the 2016 Turin FIBA World Olympic Qualifying Tournament, and he played with Greece at that competition, where he averaged 7.3 points and 1.7 rebounds per game.

Antetokounmpo next represented Greece at the 2017 FIBA EuroBasket competition. He had averages of 6.1 points and 1.9 rebounds per game during the tournament. During the 2019 FIBA World Cup Qualifiers, Antetokounmpo averaged 8.8 points and 1.8 rebounds per game. At the main 2019 FIBA World Cup tournament, he contributed 6.0 points and 1.4 rebounds per game to Greece's national team.

He then played with Greece at the 2022 FIBA EuroBasket, where he averaged 3.0 points and 1.6 rebounds per game. While representing Greece at the 2023 FIBA World Cup Qualifiers, he had per game averages of 9.5 points and 3.0 rebounds. He was also a part of the Greek team at the 2023 FIBA World Cup. During the 2023 World Cup, his per game numbers were 3.8 points and 3.0 rebounds per game.

== Career statistics ==
Legend
GP	Games played	GS	Games started	MPG	Minutes per game
FG%	Field goal percentage	3P%	3-point field goal percentage	FT%	Free throw percentage
RPG	Rebounds per game	APG	Assists per game	SPG	Steals per game
BPG	Blocks per game	PPG	Points per game	**Bold**	Career high
†	Won an NBA championship

=== NBA ===
==== Regular season ====
Year	Team	GP	GS	MPG	FG%	3P%	FT%	RPG	APG	SPG	BPG	PPG
2015–16	New York	2	0	3.1	**.750**	.000	—	.5	.0	.0	.0	3.0
2019–20	Milwaukee	20	2	6.4	.500	.000	.412	1.2	**.8**	**.4**	.1	2.8
2020–21†	Milwaukee	**57**	3	9.7	.489	**.241**	.510	**2.2**	**.8**	**.4**	.2	2.9
2021–22	Milwaukee	48	**6**	**9.9**	.547	.143	**.630**	2.1	.5	.3	**.3**	**3.6**
2022–23	Milwaukee	37	0	5.6	.435	.000	.500	1.2	.4	.1	.1	1.4
2023–24	Milwaukee	34	0	4.6	.533	.000	.000	.4	.5	.2	.1	.9
2025–26	Milwaukee	34	0	4.4	.469	.000	.567	.9	.4	**.4**	.2	1.4
Career		232	11	7.2	.506	.134	.536	1.5	.6	.3	.2	2.3

==== Playoffs ====
Year	Team	GP	GS	MPG	FG%	3P%	FT%	RPG	APG	SPG	BPG	PPG
2021†	Milwaukee	**13**	0	**3.4**	.286	—	**.833**	**.8**	**.2**	.4	.2	**.7**
2022	Milwaukee	8	0	2.5	**.667**	—	.333	.5	.1	.1	.0	.6
2023	Milwaukee	2	0	2.6	—	—	—	.0	.0	.0	.0	.0
2024	Milwaukee	2	0	2.4	—	—	—	.0	.0	**.5**	**.5**	.0
Career		25	0	3.0	.400	—	.667	.6	.2	.3	.1	.6

=== EuroLeague ===
Year	Team	GP	GS	MPG	FG%	3P%	FT%	RPG	APG	SPG	BPG	PPG	PIR
2017–18	Panathinaikos	**33**	**26**	11.2	.528	.286	**.583**	**2.2**	**.4**	.3	**.3**	3.6	3.8
2018–19	Panathinaikos	29	9	**12.1**	**.593**	**.318**	.448	1.8	.3	**.8**	**.3**	**4.2**	**3.9**
Career		62	35	11.7	.560	.306	.523	2.0	.3	.5	.3	3.9	3.9

== Personal life ==
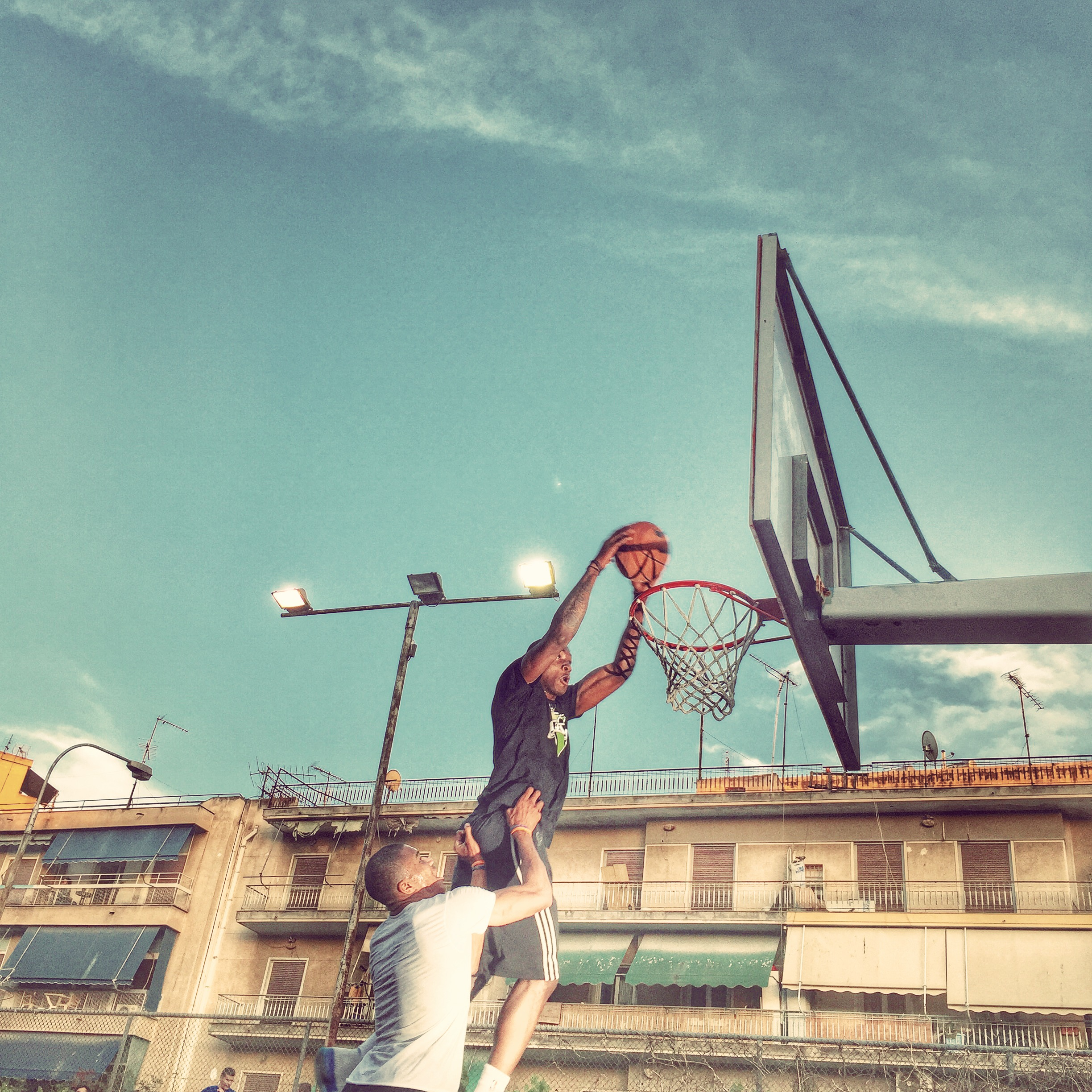
Giannis and Thanasis playing basketball at a local court in Sepolia, Athens

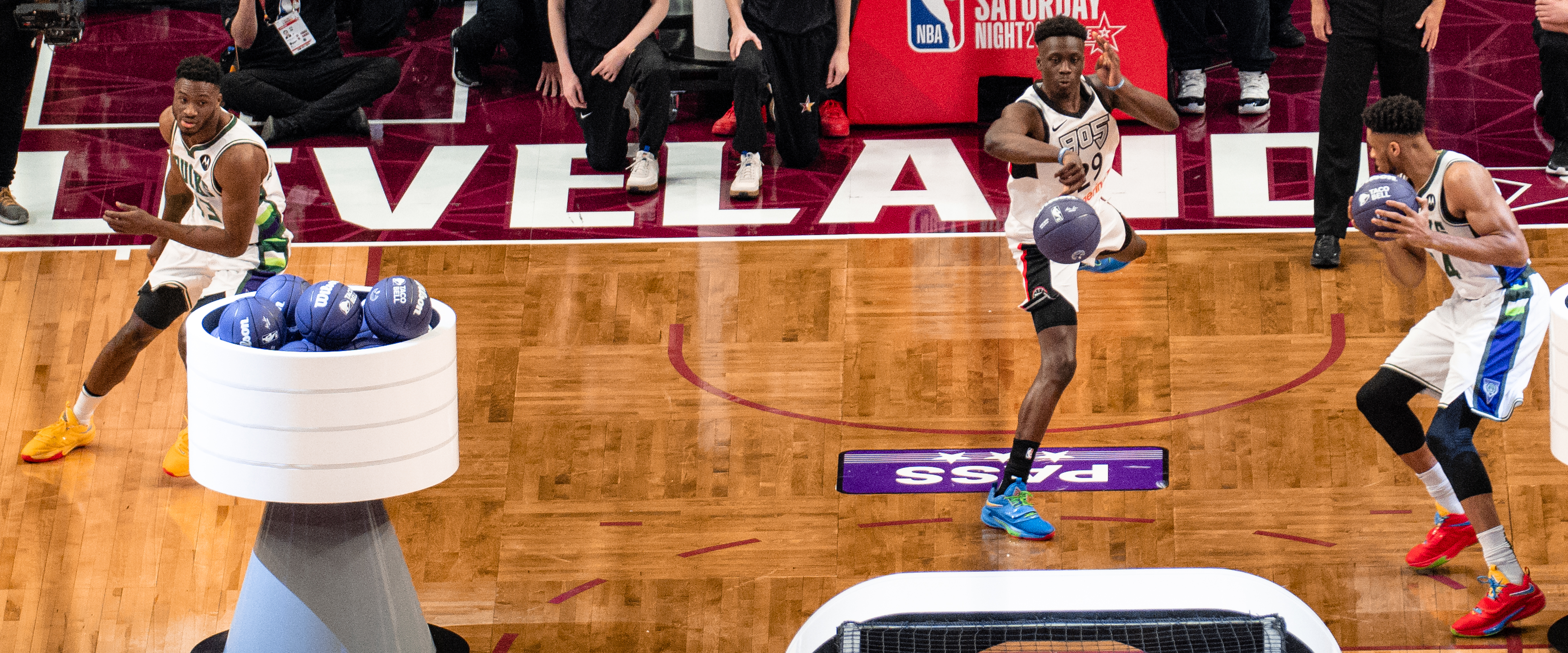
The Antetokounmpo brothers participating in the 2022 NBA All-Star Skills Challenge

Antetokounmpo was born in Athens, Greece to parents from Nigeria, and grew up in the Athens neighborhood of Sepolia. His late father, Charles, was a soccer player, while his mother, Veronica, is a former high jumper. His parents are from different Nigerian ethnic groups—Charles was Yoruba, and Veronica is Igbo. He officially gained Greek citizenship on May 9, 2013, with the official legal spelling of his last name being Antetokounmpo. His oldest brother, Francis, follows his father's career path and plays soccer professionally.

His younger brother, Giannis Antetokounmpo (b. 1994), was drafted 15th overall in the 2013 NBA draft by the Milwaukee Bucks. With Giannis known as "The Greek Freak", Thanasis was sometimes referred to as "Greek Freak 2", although his own nickname was "The Greek Streak". In addition, he is also the older brother of Kostas and Alex, both of whom also trained with Filathlitikos. Antetokounmpo's mother gave each of her four sons born in Greece, both a Greek and a Nigerian name. Kostas has played in the NBA with the Dallas Mavericks and Los Angeles Lakers, and also with several EuroLeague clubs. Alex, who graduated from Dominican High School, also went on to play professional basketball in the NBA G League and in Europe. Giannis has credited his development and upbringing to Thanasis, who was a catalyst for him to gain interest in basketball. Thanasis and his longtime partner Katia have three daughters. The couple married in July 2026.
