= Tokunbo vehicle =

Tokunbo vehicle is the local name ascribed to used vehicles imported from Europe in Nigeria. The word Tokunbo (Yoruba: Tòkunbọ̀) is a unisex name given to children of Yoruba heritage born overseas, and literally means 'returned from overseas' or 'returned from across the sea'. In Nigeria, the Tokunbo market signifies the place where different kinds of used items such as electronics, cars, and domestic goods are sold. These products are popular among the lower-middle class who cannot afford new cars often called tear rubber.

== Background ==
The Tokunbo market represents one of the few ways to determine the strength or soundness of an economy, because it creates a dumping ground of used and hazardous products from developed nations to the developing ones. Therefore, a nation with such an engagement could be showing the effect of economic deficiency. These products are imported through our seaport and land border (Cotonou e.g. Tin can Island in Apapa). According to the expert in the market, model which is the year of manufacture of the product is determined by the life span of such product.

== Negative impact of engaging in Tokunbo Market ==
- Most times, these products appear not to be cost-effective because it is a resultant effect of a product that has been used for several years before being sold to the second buyer. Due to the geographical changes on the product destination, they are prone to incessant fault.
- The involvement in this investment by a nation will not permit the indigenous companies manufacturing vehicles to thrive. Thereby shrinking the gross domestic product by discouraging local investors in the industry.
- The need to invest in spiritual engagement to avert the negative implication of the original owner i.e. stolen vehicle.
- It turns a country to a dumping ground for toxic items which were recycled in the country of import. This might later lead to health hazard in the nearest future.
