= NBA All-Star Celebrity Game =

Annual basketball game

The NBA All-Star Celebrity Game is an annual exhibition basketball game hosted by the National Basketball Association as it takes place during NBA All-Star Weekend and features retired NBA players, WNBA players, actors, musicians and athletes from sports other than basketball.

The game was first held during the 2002–03 season as part of the NBA All-Star Weekend in Atlanta, Georgia. The NBA All-Star Celebrity Game is played on Friday in the same host city as the NBA All-Star Game. However, the game is not held in the same arena as all the other All-Star Saturday events. Instead, it is held on the NBA Jam Session's practice court.

There was no game in 2021 due to the COVID-19 pandemic. It resumed in 2022.

In 2023, the NBA All-Star Game introduced a new format for the draft, where players selected teams live during the event instead of before the game.

== Rules ==
The game is played under modified NBA rules.

- Games were played in four-quarters of 8 minutes from 2003 to 2011; since 2012, the game was extended to 10 minutes a quarter (similar to FIBA, WNBA. and NCAA Women's rules).
- Each team is allowed one timeout per half. Timeouts don't carry over to the next half.
- From 2003 to 2012, the game clock does not stop while the play is not active except for timeouts, the final two minutes of the halves & overtime, or at the official's discretion. Since 2013, the clock stops during the final two minutes of every quarter except for timeouts, overtime and at the official's discretion.
- Overtime periods are two minutes in length with a running clock, each team is allowed one timeout during the overtime period, plus any not used in regulation.
- Players and/or coaches can be assessed technical fouls and could risk immediate disqualification.
- There was no Most Valuable Player until 2005. From 2005 to 2010, the media members in attendance voted for the MVP. Since 2011, the fans in attendance and TV viewers now vote for the MVP through text messaging and social media.
- The game did not use the shot clock rule put into place during the 2011–12 season in which the last five seconds of the shot clock were modified to include tenths of a second from 2012 to 2014; the rule was put in effect since 2015. However, the shot clock did not use tenths in the final five seconds until during the second half of the 2024 NBA All-Star Celebrity Game.
- In 2018, there is a 4-point decal located 2 feet from the top of the 3-point line which will be active during the second half of the game. To score four points, a player's foot must be touching any part of a decal. Since 2019, the 4-point decal has become a 4-point line set a yard behind the 3-point line and the line is in use for the entire game. A player's foot must be behind the 4-point line to score four points.

== Most Valuable Player ==
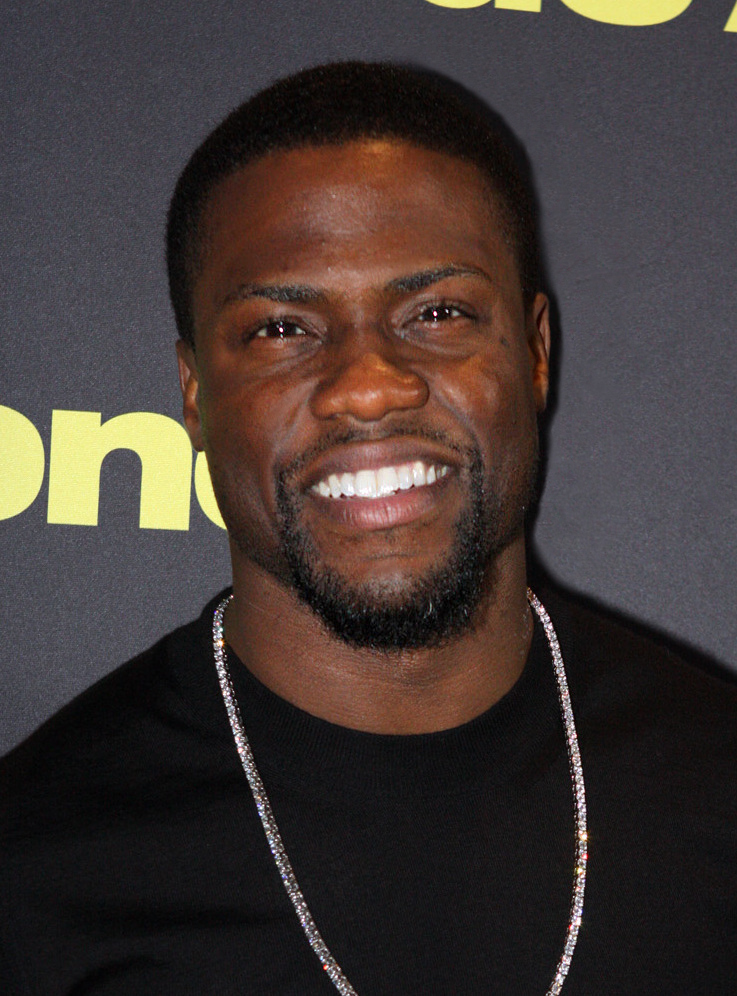
Kevin Hart won MVP in four consecutive years from 2012 to 2015.

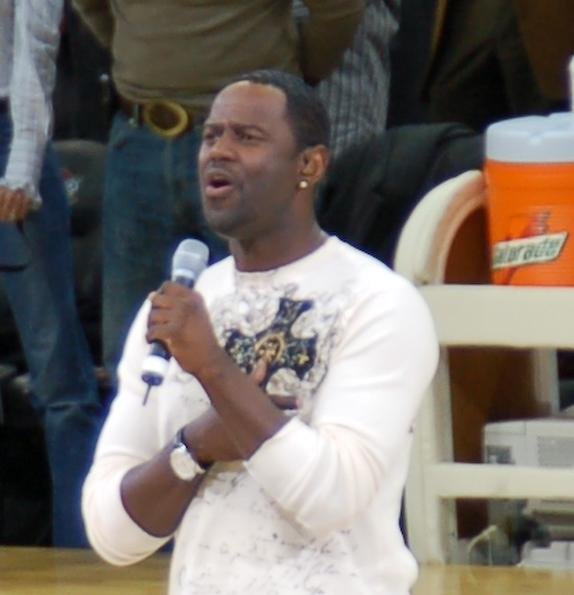
Inaugural MVP Brian McKnight

Year	Winner
2003–2004	No MVP awarded
2005	Brian McKnight
2006	Nelly (Note: Nelly won the award while being on the losing team.)
2007	Tony Potts
2008	Terrell Owens (1)
2009	Terrell Owens (2)
2010	Michael Rapaport
2011	Justin Bieber (Note: Bieber won the award while being on the losing team.)
2012	Kevin Hart (1)
2013	Kevin Hart (2)
2014	Kevin Hart (3), Arne Duncan (1) (Note: Hart originally won the award, but he passed the award to Arne Duncan.)
2015	Kevin Hart (4) (Note: Hart won the award while being on the losing team.)
2016	Win Butler
2017	Brandon Armstrong
2018	Quavo
2019	Famous Los
2020	Common
2021	Game not held due to the COVID-19 pandemic
2022	Alex Toussaint
2023	DK Metcalf
2024	Micah Parsons
2025	Rome Flynn
2026	Rome Flynn (2)

== Multi-time winners ==
Rank	Player	Times leader	Years
1	Kevin Hart	4	2012, 2013, 2014, 2015
2	Terrell Owens	2	2008, 2009
2	Rome Flynn	2	2025, 2026

== 2000s ==
=== 2003 ===
The inaugural NBA All-Star Celebrity Game was played on Friday, February 7, 2003, at the Georgia World Congress Center in Atlanta, Georgia.

Celebrities like Justin Timberlake and Jamie Foxx highlighted this NBA All-Star Celebrity game playing alongside WNBA players, NBA legends, and other celebrities. Former NBA players and current Inside the NBA analysts Kenny Smith and Charles Barkley were the opposing coaches. Kenny Smith and the Jets wound up winning in a tight-knit game 46–43.

February 7, 2003

Recap

Kenny Smith and the Jets 46, Sir Charles and the Court Jesters 43

Georgia World Congress Center, Atlanta, Georgia

Sir Charles and the Court Jesters
Player	Background
Mark McGrath	Singer
Ice Cube	Actor/Rapper
Nelly	Rapper/Producer
Tim McGraw	Singer
Ticha Penicheiro	WNBA player
Moses Malone	NBA legend
Nikki McCray	WNBA player
Spud Webb	NBA legend
Head coach: Charles Barkley (NBA legend/TNT analyst/TV personality)

Kenny Smith and the Jets
Player	Background
Justin Timberlake	Singer/Actor
Jamie Foxx	Singer/Actor
Roger Lodge	Actor/TV host
Rebecca Lobo	WNBA player
Sue Bird	WNBA player
Jonathan Lipnicki	Actor
Manute Bol	NBA legend
Anthony Anderson	Actor
Muggsy Bogues	NBA legend
Brian McKnight	Singer
Head coach: Kenny Smith (NBA Legend/TNT analyst)

=== 2004 ===
The 2004 McDonald's NBA All-Star Celebrity Game was played on Friday, February 13, 2004, at the Los Angeles Convention Center in Los Angeles, California.

The NBA All-Star Celebrity Game featured celebrities from Paris Hilton to Bill Walton. Although Richard Jefferson of the Lakers led all scorers with 16 points, the Lakers would lose to the Braves 60–52.

February 13, 2004

Recap

Buffalo Braves 60, Minneapolis Lakers 52

Los Angeles Convention Center, Los Angeles, California

Buffalo Braves
Player	Background
Sue Bird (2)	WNBA player
Nick Carter	Singer/actor
Tom Cavanagh	Actor
Morris Chestnut	Actor
DJ Clue	DJ
Donald Faison	Actor
Mark Jackson	NBA player
Roger Lodge (2)	Blind Date host
Cuttino Mobley	NBA Player
Nelly (2)	Rapper
Henry Simmons	Actor
James Lafferty	Actor
Head coach: P Diddy (Rapper)
Assistant coach: Paris Hilton (Socialite/actress)
general manager: Greg Anthony (ESPN analyst)

Minneapolis Lakers
Player	Background
Bill Bellamy	Actor/comedian
Nick Cannon	Actor/singer
Kevin Hart	Actor/comedian
Steve Howey	Actor
Richard Jefferson	NBA Player
Mark McGrath (2)	Singer/Extra host
Frankie Muniz	Actor
Sean Paul	Reggae artist
Michael Rapaport	Actor
Nikki Teasley	WNBA player
Head coach: Ashton Kutcher (Actor)
Assistant coach: Lisa Leslie (WNBA player)
general manager: Bill Walton (ESPN analyst)

=== 2005 ===
The 2005 McDonald's NBA All-Star Celebrity Game sponsored by Sprite was played on Friday, February 18, 2005, at the Colorado Convention Center in Denver, Colorado.

Rapper Nelly, pop rock singer Ryan Cabrera, rapper/actor Ice Cube, and actor Danny Masterson were among some of the celebrities who participated. After playing the first half with the Nuggets, Entertainment Tonight correspondent Kevin Frazier played the second half with Team Denver. R&B Singer Brian McKnight scored the game winning basket as he threw in an off-balance shot that sailed in while getting the foul call with 9.9 seconds in the fourth quarter, and he was named the first ever MVP of the NBA All-Star Celebrity game.

February 18, 2005

Recap

Team Nuggets 55, Team Denver 54

Colorado Convention Center, Denver, Colorado

Team Denver
Player	Background
DJ Clue (2)	Rapper
Jermaine Dupri	Rapper
Becky Hammon	WNBA player
Lisa Leslie	WNBA player
Roger Lodge (3)	Blind Date host
Danny Masterson	Actor
Mark McGrath (3)	Singer/Extra host
Wilmer Valderrama	Actor
Head coach: Andre Miller (NBA player)
Assistant coach: Vivica A. Fox (actress)
general manager: Greg Anthony (ESPN analyst)

Team Nuggets
Player	Background
Ryan Cabrera	Singer
Donald Faison (2)	Actor
Kevin Frazier	Entertainment Tonight correspondent
Eric Koston	Professional skateboarder
Brian McKnight (2)	Singer
Nelly (3)	Rapper
Nykesha Sales	WNBA player
Diana Taurasi	WNBA player
Head coach: Earl Boykins (NBA player)
Assistant coach: Gabrielle Union (actress)
General manager: Stephen A. Smith (ESPN analyst)

=== 2006 ===
The 2006 McDonald's NBA All-Star Celebrity Game was played on Friday, February 17, 2006, at the George R. Brown Convention Center in Houston, Texas.

Nelly was named MVP with a game-high 14 points and 12 rebounds and hit H-Town's only two three-pointers in a losing effort as the Clutch City Team beat the H-Town Team 37–33.

February 17, 2006

Recap

Clutch City Team 37, H-Town Team 33

George R. Brown Convention Center, Houston, Texas

H-Town Team
Player	Background
Carlos Bernard	Actor
Chris Brown	Singer
Nick Cannon (2)	Actor/singer
Becky Hammon (2)	WNBA player
Nelly (4)	Singer/actor
Tony Potts	Access Hollywood correspondent
Brandon Routh	Actor
Coach: Eva Longoria (actress)
General manager: Stephen A. Smith (ESPN analyst)

Clutch City Team
Player	Background
Bow Wow	Hip-hop artist/actor
Swin Cash	WNBA player
Ice Cube (2)	Rapper/actor
Donald Faison (3)	Actor
Andrew Firestone	ABC's The Bachelor (Season 3)
Kevin Frazier (2)	Entertainment Tonight correspondent
Chris Meloni	Actor
Head coach: Queen Latifah (singer/actress)
General manager: Greg Anthony (ESPN analyst)

=== 2007 ===
The 2007 NBA All-Star Celebrity Game was played on Friday, February 16, 2007, at the Las Vegas Convention Center in Winchester, Nevada. Jamie Foxx was scheduled to play but did not play to perform at a concert later that night. Donald Faison started for the East but was traded to the West team in exchange for no one during the second quarter. During the third quarter New Orleans Saints running back and West player Reggie Bush slightly sprained his right ankle and did not play the rest of the game. However, Access Hollywood correspondent and fellow West teammate Tony Potts scored 14 points and eight rebounds for the West team as he helped the West beat the East 40–21 and was named the game's MVP. During the game, Jazz Bear, the mascot of the Utah Jazz, ESPN reporter Jim Gray, and former NBA player Jerome Williams played a few minutes in the game.

February 16, 2007

Recap

West 40, East 21

Las Vegas Convention Center, Winchester, Nevada

East
Player	Background
David Arquette	Actor
Michael Clarke Duncan	Actor
Taye Diggs	Actor
Donald Faison (4)	Actor
Bobby Flay	TV chef
Jamie Kennedy	Actor/comedian
Nelly (5)	Hip-hop artist/actor
Katie Smith	WNBA player
LaDainian Tomlinson	NFL player
Carrot Top	Comedian
Chris Tucker	Actor/comedian
Head coach: Tim Legler (ESPN analyst)
Assistant coach: James Pickens Jr. (actor)

West
Player	Background
Bow Wow (2)	Hip-hop artist/actor
Reggie Bush	NFL player
Nick Cannon (3)	Actor/comedian
Tamika Catchings	WNBA player
James Denton	Actor
Jamie Foxx (2)	Actor/comedian/singer
Tony Potts (2)	Access Hollywood correspondent
Jonathan Silverman	Actor
Head coach: Greg Anthony (ESPN analyst)
Assistant coach: Wayne Newton (singer/actor)

=== 2008 ===
The NBA All-Star Celebrity Game was played on Friday, February 15, 2008, at the Ernest N. Morial Convention Center in New Orleans, Louisiana. A total of 17 celebrities took part in the game. The game was marked by a surprise appearance by Dallas Cowboys wide receiver Terrell Owens in the middle of the second quarter, where he joined and played with the New Orleans team. Owens scored 18 points including a dunk. He was named MVP of the game after helping his team win 51–50. ESPN analyst Ric Bucher was the commissioner for the game.

February 15, 2008

Recap

Team New Orleans 51, Team Hornets 50

Ernest N. Morial Convention Center, New Orleans, Louisiana

Team New Orleans
Player	Background
A. J. Calloway	Extra correspondent
Seth Gilliam	Actor
Zach Gilford	Actor
Taylor Hicks	Singer/2006 American Idol winner
James Lafferty	Actor
Ne-Yo	Singer/actor
Terrell Owens	NFL player
Master P	Hip-hop artist
Ruth Riley	WNBA player
Coach: Gabrielle Union (actress)
General manager: Stephen A. Smith (ESPN analyst)

Team Hornets
Player	Background
Swin Cash (2)	WNBA player
Common	Rapper/actor
Terry Crews	Actor
James Kyson Lee	Actor
Floyd Mayweather	Boxer
Tony Potts (3)	Access Hollywood correspondent
Chris Tucker (2)	Actor/comedian
Deion Sanders	NFL legend
Coach: Alyssa Milano (actress)
General manager: Bill Walton (NBA legend/ESPN analyst)

=== 2009 ===
The 2009 McDonald's NBA All-Star Celebrity Game was played on Friday, February 13, 2009, at the Phoenix Convention Center in Phoenix, Arizona. A total of 17 celebrities took part in the game. Basketball Hall of Famers Magic Johnson and Julius Erving, who combined for 23 NBA All-Star appearances, served as coaches for the celebrity teams. NBA legends, Dominique Wilkins and Clyde Drexler, were joined by former players, Dan Majerle and Rick Fox, in the celebrity team roster. WNBA stars Lisa Leslie and Kara Lawson also participated in the game along with four Harlem Globetrotters players.

Previous year's MVP, Terrell Owens scored a game-high 17 points and led the East Sunrisers to a 60–57 victory over the West Sunsetters. Owens, an American football star for Dallas Cowboys, was named as the Celebrity Game MVP for the second year in a row. The game was marked by a surprise appearance by another Hall of Famer Nancy Lieberman in the middle of the game, where she joined and played with the East Sunrisers. ESPN play-by-play commentator Mike Breen also made a surprise appearance as the referee for the game.

February 13, 2009

Recap

East Sunrisers 60, West Sunsetters 57

Phoenix Convention Center, Phoenix, Arizona

East Sunrisers
Player	Background
Dominique Wilkins	NBA legend
Rick Fox	Los Angeles Lakers legend
Kara Lawson	WNBA player
James Denton (2)	Actor
Zachary Levi	Actor
Terrell Owens (2)	NFL player
"Special K" Daley	Harlem Globetrotters
"Wildkat" Edgerson	Harlem Globetrotters
Nancy Lieberman	WNBA legend
Coach: Julius Erving (NBA legend)

West Sunsetters
Player	Background
Clyde Drexler	NBA legend
Dan Majerle	Phoenix Suns legend
Lisa Leslie (2)	WNBA player
Donald Faison (5)	Actor
Michael Rapaport (2)	Actor
Chris Tucker (3)	Actor/comedian
"Scooter" Christensen	Harlem Globetrotters
"Handles" Franklin	Harlem Globetrotters
Coach: Magic Johnson (NBA legend/ESPN analyst)

== 2010s ==
=== 2010 ===
The 2010 NBA All-Star Celebrity Game presented by Final Fantasy XIII was played on Friday, February 12, 2010, at the Dallas Convention Center in Dallas, Texas. A total of 20 celebrities took part in the game, including several former basketball players. Basketball Hall of Famer Magic Johnson and five-time NBA All-Star Alonzo Mourning, served as coaches for the celebrity teams. Three former NBA players, Robert Horry, Rick Fox and Chris Mullin, along with Hall of Famer Nancy Lieberman and Dallas Mavericks owner Mark Cuban, participated in the game. The West team won 41–37 over the East. "Special K" Daley, one of the four Harlem Globetrotters player that participated in the game, scored game-high 18 points for the West. Actor Michael Rapaport, who scored 4 points, was named as the Celebrity Game MVP for his defense on football player Terrell Owens, the MVP of the last two Celebrity Games. Owens, who played both college basketball and football in Chattanooga, led the East with 10 points. The Globetrotters, joined by "Curly" Neal and "Bucket" Blakes, entertained the crowd during the timeouts with their signature ball-handling tricks.

February 12, 2010

Recap

West 41, East 37

Dallas Convention Center, Dallas, Texas

East
Player	Background
Dr. Oz	Doctor/TV host
Chris Tucker (4)	Actor/comedian
Joel Moore	Actor
Pitbull	Musician
Terrell Owens (3)	Football player
"Flight Time" Lang	Harlem Globetrotters
"Big Easy" Lofton	Harlem Globetrotters
Angel McCoughtry	WNBA player
Nancy Lieberman (2)	WNBA legend/Basketball Hall of Famer
Rick Fox (2)	NBA legend
Head coach: Alonzo Mourning (NBA legend)
Assistant coach: Mario Lopez (Actor)

West
Player	Background
Anthony Kim	Golfer
Terrence J	TV host
Mark Cuban	Dallas Mavericks owner
Common (2)	Actor/musician
Michael Rapaport (3)	Actor
"Scooter" Christensen (2)	Harlem Globetrotters
"Special K" Daley (2)	Harlem Globetrotters
Becky Hammon (3)	WNBA player
Chris Mullin	NBA legend
Robert Horry	NBA legend
Head coach: Magic Johnson (NBA legend/ESPN analyst)
Assistant coach: Drake (Musician)

=== 2011 ===
The 2011 BBVA Celebrity All-Star Game was played on Friday, February 18 at the Los Angeles Convention Center in Los Angeles, California. The head coaches were Basketball Hall of Famers Bill Walton and Magic Johnson. Their assistants were comedians Ty Burrell and Jason Alexander. Each team featured fake "general managers" who simulated to have chosen the team.

The game's MVP was chosen by voting through text messaging and social media. At the end of the game, Justin Bieber was announced the MVP. Bieber scored eight points (3–11 FG), and had two rebounds and four assists. NBA legend Chris Mullin said of Bieber, "He's got a nice little game... but more importantly, he's got great passion. It looked like he loves the game."

February 18, 2011

Recap

East 54, West 49

Los Angeles Convention Center, Los Angeles, California

West
Members	Occupation
Justin Bieber	singer
Swin Cash (3)	current WNBA player
Rick Fox (3)	former NBA player/actor
A.C. Green	former NBA player
Rob Kardashian	TV personality/model
Zachary Levi (2)	actor/singer
Romeo Miller	entertainer/actor
Jalen Rose	former NBA player/ESPN analyst
Trey Songz	singer-songwriter
Head coach: Magic Johnson (NBA legend/ESPN analyst)
Assistant coach: Ty Burrell (Actor)
General manager: Jimmy Kimmel (Comedian)

East
Members	Occupation
Nick Cannon (4)	TV personality/actor
Tamika Catchings (2)	current WNBA player
Common (3)	rapper/actor
Arne Duncan	US Secretary of Education
Chris Mullin (2)	former NBA player/ESPN analyst
Scottie Pippen	NBA legend
Michael Rapaport (4)	entertainer/actor
Mitch Richmond	former NBA player
Jason Sudeikis	TV personality/actor
Head coach: Bill Walton (NBA legend/ESPN analyst)
Assistant coach: Jason Alexander (Actor)
General manager: Bill Simmons (ESPN columnist)

=== 2012 ===
The 2012 Sprint NBA All-Star Celebrity Game was played on Friday, February 24, 2012, at the Orange County Convention Center in Orlando, Florida. Participants in 2012's version of the game include J. Cole, Common, Vinny Guadagnino, Kevin Hart, and Ne-Yo.

Arne Duncan scored 17 points, and grabbed eight rebounds for the East, but teammate Kevin Hart, who recorded 8 points and 6 assists, was named the game's MVP. Hart was also given two technical fouls and was ejected from the game with about a minute to go in the fourth quarter for protesting a call made against him. The East won the game 86–54. Orlando Magic center Dwight Howard coached for the East team and Oklahoma City Thunder forward Kevin Durant coached the West team.

February 24, 2012

Recap

East 86, West 54

Orange County Convention Center, Orlando, Florida

West
Player	Background
Javier Colon	Singer and songwriter/The Voice season 1 winner
Common (4)	Rapper/actor
Tim Hardaway	NBA legend
Chris Mullin (3)	NBA legend/ESPN analyst
Ne-Yo (2)	Singer/actor
Mitch Richmond (2)	NBA legend
Drew Scott	Real estate expert, co-host of Property Brothers
J.B. Smoove	Actor/comedian
Jesse Williams	Actor/model
Coach: Kevin Durant (NBA player)

East
Player	Background
Nick Anderson	NBA legend
Tamika Catchings (3)	WNBA player
J. Cole	Rapper
Arne Duncan (2)	US Secretary of Education
Doug Gottlieb	ESPN analyst
Vinny Guadagnino	Jersey Shore personality
Penny Hardaway	NBA legend
Kevin Hart (2)	Actor/comedian
Jonathan Scott	Contractor, co-host of Property Brothers
Coach: Dwight Howard (NBA player)

=== 2013 ===
The 2013 Sprint NBA All-Star Celebrity Game was played on Friday, February 15, 2013, at the George R. Brown Convention Center in Houston, Texas. The game featured 18 players, including Jamaican Olympic sprinter Usain Bolt, Entertainment Tonight correspondent Rocsi Diaz, actor Josh Hutcherson, ABC News correspondent John Schriffen, and Kevin Hart. Oklahoma City Thunder point guard Russell Westbrook and Houston Rockets shooting guard James Harden served as the game's head coaches.

Josh Hutcherson was the leading scorer of the East Team with 11 points which included three 3-pointers. Arne Duncan and Terrence Jenkins were the leading scorers of the West Team with 11 points; teammate Kevin Hart, however, who scored five points, three rebounds, and one assist, was named Celebrity Game MVP for the second successive year. Hart became the second player to win the Most Valuable Player award twice joining Terrell Owens, who won it in 2008 and 2009.

February 15, 2013

Recap

West 58, East 38

George R. Brown Convention Center, Houston, Texas

East
Player	Background
Usain Bolt	100m, 200m and 4 × 100 m sprinter
Bruce Bowen	Former NBA player
Nick Cannon (5)	TV personality/actor
Tamika Catchings (4)	WNBA player
Rocsi Diaz	Entertainment Tonight correspondent
Sean Elliott	NBA legend
Josh Hutcherson	Actor
Ne-Yo (3)	Singer/actor
Trey Songz (2)	Singer-songwriter
Head coach: Russell Westbrook (NBA player)
Assistant coach: Queen Latifah (Rapper/actress)

West
Player	Background
Common (5)	Rapper/actor
Clyde Drexler (2)	NBA legend
Kevin Hart (3)	Comedian/actor
Arne Duncan (3)	U.S. Secretary of Education
Terrence Jenkins (2)	E! News co-anchor
Maya Moore	WNBA player
Dikembe Mutombo	NBA legend
Ryen Russillo	SVP & Russillo co-host
John Schriffen	ABC News correspondent
Head coach: James Harden (NBA player)
Assistant coach: Samantha Harris (TV host/actress)

=== 2014 ===
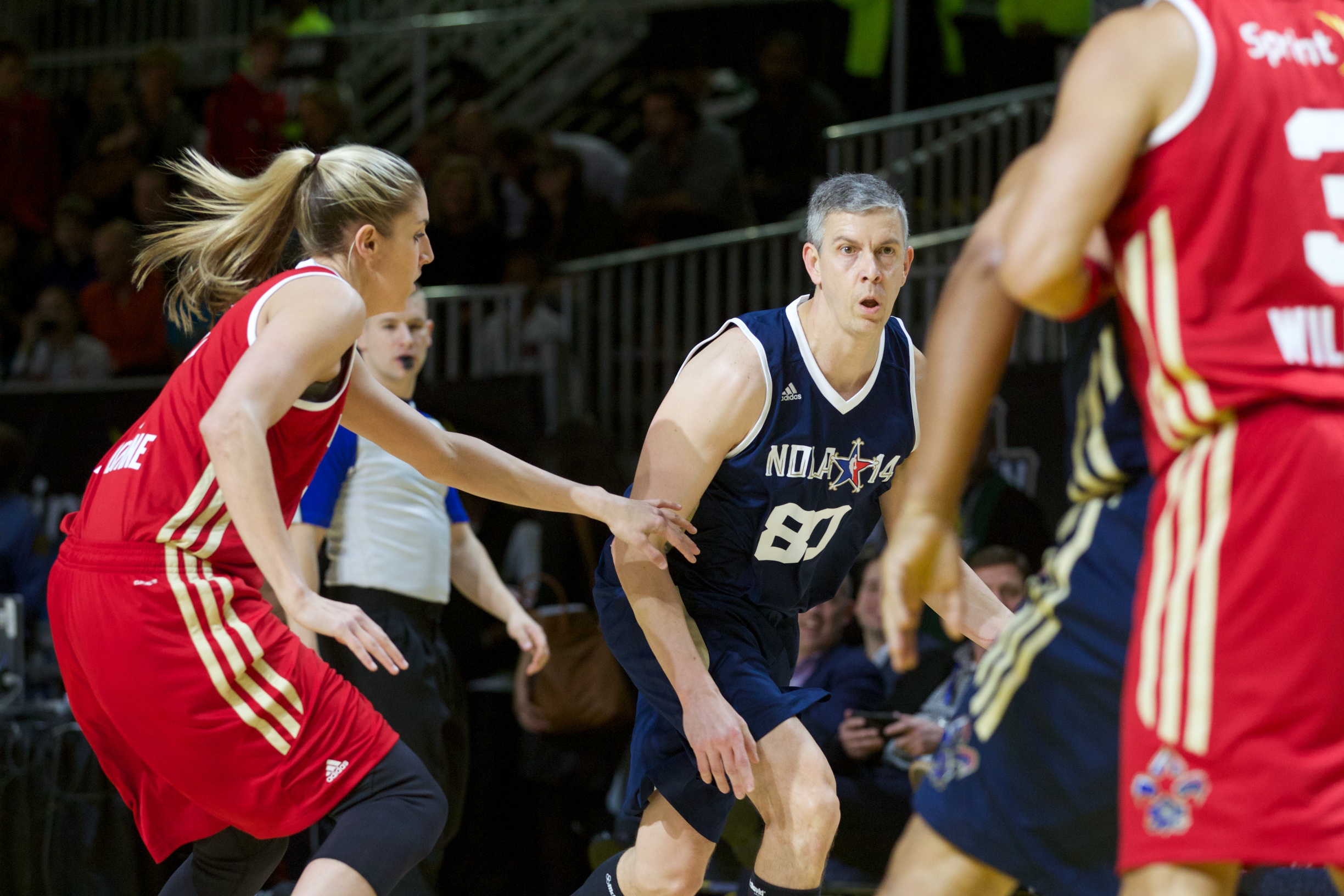
Arne Duncan playing in the 2014 Celebrity Game.

The 2014 Sprint NBA All-Star Celebrity Game was played on Friday, February 14, 2014, from the Sprint Arena at the New Orleans Ernest N. Morial Convention Center in New Orleans, Louisiana. The game featured 18 players including comedian/actor and two-time Celebrity Game MVP Kevin Hart, Victoria's Secret model Erin Heatherton, ESPN Mike & Mike co-hosts Mike Golic and Mike Greenberg, hip-hop artist Snoop Dogg, Actor Michael B. Jordan (The Wire), United States Secretary of Education Arne Duncan, and others. ESPN's NBA Countdown co-hosts Bill Simmons and Jalen Rose were the head coaches. Brandon Franklin was a fan who won the Sprint's Assistant Coach for a Day Sweepstakes and he served as assistant coach for the East team.

Arne Duncan led the way with a celebrity game record of 20 points, and added 11 rebounds, and six assists as the East team beat the West team 60–56. The West's Kevin Hart scored 7 points and 4 assists was once again voted MVP by the fans; however, due to his lackluster play he passed the award to Arne Duncan.

February 14, 2014

Recap

East 60, West 56

Sprint Arena, New Orleans, Louisiana

East
Player	Background
Bruce Bowen (2)	Former NBA player
Nick Cannon (6)	TV personality/actor
Skylar Diggins	WNBA player
Arne Duncan (4)	U.S. Secretary of Education
Mike Greenberg	ESPN Radio's Mike & Mike co-host
Kristen Ledlow	NBA Inside Stuff co-host
Romeo Miller (2)	Entertainer/actor
Stan Verrett	ESPN's SportsCenter anchor
Wale	Rapper
Head coach: Jalen Rose (Former NBA player and NBA analyst)
Assistant coach: David Jacoby (ESPN producer, Grantland writer and editor)
Assistant coach: Brandon Franklin (Winner of the Sprint's Assistant Coach for a Day Sweepstakes)

West
Player	Background
Tamika Catchings	WNBA player
Elena Delle Donne	WNBA player
Snoop Dogg	Rapper/actor
Mike Golic	ESPN Radio's Mike & Mike co-host
Kevin Hart (4)	Comedian/actor
Erin Heatherton	Victoria's Secret model
Terrence Jenkins (3)	E! News co-anchor
Michael B. Jordan	Actor
Jesse Williams (2)	Actor
Head coach: Bill Simmons (Sports columnist, NBA analyst and author)
Assistant coach: Zach Lowe (Grantland writer)

=== 2015 ===
The 2015 Sprint NBA All-Star Celebrity Game was played on Friday, February 13, 2015. It was held at Madison Square Garden in New York City, home of the New York Knicks. This was the first celebrity game played at an NBA arena in the event's history. The game was televised nationally by ESPN.

This game featured 20 players including Arcade Fire frontman Win Butler, Bollywood actor Abhishek Bachchan, 2014 Little League World Series female pitcher Mo'ne Davis, WNBA player Skylar Diggins, Paralympic athlete Blake Leeper, NBA hall of famer Chris Mullin, and Memphis Grizzlies owner Robert Pera. This game also featured two All-Star Celebrity Game MVPs; 2010 winner Michael Rapaport and 2012, 2013, and 2014 winner Kevin Hart.

ESPN Radio's "Mike & Mike" hosts Mike Golic and Mike Greenberg coached the West and East teams respectively. The West team assistant coaches were film director Spike Lee and tennis legend John McEnroe. New York Knicks' small forward Carmelo Anthony and former Baylor Bears center Isaiah Austin was the assistant coaches for the East team. Actress and singer Keke Palmer sang the national anthem, and Canadian reggae fusion band Magic! performed at halftime.

Although the West led by Atlanta Dream point guard Shoni Schimmel with 17 points beat the East 57–51, Kevin Hart of the East who scored 15 points and won the MVP award. This was Hart's fourth MVP award in a row, a record for the Celebrity Game. Hart would then announce his retirement from the annual celebrity game.

February 13, 2015

Recap

West 57, East 51

Madison Square Garden, New York City

West
Player	Background
Anthony Anderson (2)	Actor
Win Butler	Singer
Nick Cannon (7)	TV personality, actor
Mo'ne Davis	Little League pitcher
Skylar Diggins (2)	WNBA player
Ansel Elgort	Actor
Chris Mullin (4)	Former NBA player
Robert Pera	Memphis Grizzlies owner
Sarah Silverman	Comedian, actress
Jesse Williams (3)	Actor
Head coach: Mike Golic (ESPN Radio's Mike & Mike co-host)
Assistant coach: Spike Lee (film director, actor)
Assistant coach: Pete Sampras (former professional tennis player)

East
Player	Background
Abhishek Bachchan	Bollywood actor
Chadwick Boseman	Actor
Tina Charles	WNBA player
Common (6)	Rapper, actor
Kevin Hart (5)	Comedian, actor
Allan Houston	Former NBA player
Kristen Ledlow (2)	NBA Inside Stuff co-host
Blake Leeper	Paralympic athlete
Michael Rapaport (5)	Actor
Shoni Schimmel	WNBA player
Head coach: Mike Greenberg (ESPN Radio's Mike & Mike co-host)
Assistant coach: Carmelo Anthony (NBA player, New York Knicks)
Assistant coach: Isaiah Austin (former Baylor Bears player)

=== 2016 ===
The 2016 NBA Celebrity All-Star Game was played on February 12, 2016, at the Ricoh Coliseum in Toronto.

The game was a matchup of Team Canada vs. Team USA, coached by Canadian rapper Drake, and 4-time Celebrity Game MVP Kevin Hart, respectively. It featured 21 players, including actors Stephan James, Jason Sudeikis, Anthony Anderson, O'Shea Jackson, Jr., Joel David Moore, and Tom Cavanagh, and TV hosts Nick Cannon, Terrence Jenkins, and the Property Brothers. The game also included four NBA legends in Chauncey Billups, Muggsy Bogues, Tracy McGrady, and Rick Fox, as well as Elena Delle Donne and Tammy Sutton-Brown of the WNBA.

Despite the efforts of head coach Kevin Hart who later played in the game in the second half, Team Canada won 74–64 and Win Butler was named MVP of the game.

ESPN

February 12
7:00 pm ET

Recap

Team USA 64, Team Canada 74
Scoring by quarter: 15–20, 13–17, 18–16, 18–21

Ricoh Coliseum, Toronto

Team USA
Player	Background
Anthony Anderson (3)	Actor
Chauncey Billups	Former NBA player
Muggsy Bogues (2)	Former NBA player
Nick Cannon (8)	TV personality, actor
Elena Delle Donne (2)	WNBA player
O'Shea Jackson, Jr.	Actor
Terrence J (4)	TV personality, actor
Marc Lasry	Milwaukee Bucks owner
Joel David Moore (2)	Actor
Jason Sudeikis (2)	Actor, comedian
Head coach: Kevin Hart (actor)
Assistant coach: Becky Hammon (NBA assistant coach, San Antonio Spurs)
Assistant coach: Isaiah Thomas (NBA player, Boston Celtics)
Assistant coach: Andre Drummond (NBA player, Detroit Pistons)

Team Canada
Player	Background
Eugenie Bouchard	Professional tennis player
Win Butler (2)	Singer, Arcade Fire
Tom Cavanagh (2)	Actor
Rick Fox (4)	NBA TV analyst
Stephan James	Actor
Tracy McGrady	Former NBA player
Milos Raonic	Professional tennis player
Drew Scott (2)	TV host, Property Brothers
Jonathan Scott (2)	TV host, Property Brothers
Tammy Sutton-Brown	Former WNBA player
Kris Wu	Actor, rapper
Head coach: Drake (rapper)
Assistant coach: Steve Nash (former NBA player)
Assistant coach: José Bautista (MLB player, Toronto Blue Jays)
Assistant coach: DeMar DeRozan (NBA player, Toronto Raptors)

=== 2017 ===
The 2017 NBA All-Star Celebrity Game was played on Friday, February 17, 2017, at the Mercedes-Benz Superdome.

The game was a matchup of Team East vs. Team West, coached by ESPN SportsCenter hosts Michael Smith and Jemele Hill, respectively. The game featured 23 players, including actors Ansel Elgort, Caleb McLaughlin, & Romeo Miller, and TV host Nick Cannon. The game also includes two NBA legends, Jason Williams, and Baron Davis, as well as Lindsay Whalen and Candace Parker of the WNBA.

The game ended up being the second most lopsided game in Celebrity Game history to date. The East Team's 88 points were the most ever scored by one team, and their 29-point margin of victory was the second largest ever. Even though last year's MVP and the East Team player Win Butler scored 22 points and 11 rebounds, his teammate Brandon Armstrong won the 2017 All-Star Celebrity Game MVP award with 16 points and 15 rebounds.

ESPN

February 17, 2017
7:00 pm ET

Team East 88, Team West 59
Scoring by quarter: 20–12, 19–11, 20–19, 29–17

Mercedes-Benz Superdome, New Orleans, Louisiana

Team East
Player	Background
Brandon Armstrong	Social media star, former NBA D-League player
Win Butler (3)	Musician
Nick Cannon (9)	TV personality, actor, rapper
Rachel DeMita	NBA2K TV personality
Ansel Elgort (2)	Actor
Marc Lasry (2)	Milwaukee Bucks owner
Caleb McLaughlin	Actor
Peter Rosenberg	Media personality
Oscar Schmidt	Olympic Basketball legend
Lindsay Whalen	WNBA player
Jason Williams	Former NBA player
Kris Wu (2)	Actor, rapper
Head coach: Jemele Hill (ESPN host)
Assistant coach: Kyle Lowry (NBA player, Toronto Raptors)
Assistant coach: Fat Joe (rapper)
Assistant coach: DJ Khaled (rapper)

Team West
Player	Background
Mark Cuban (2)	Dallas Mavericks owner
Baron Davis	Former NBA player
Andy Grammer	Musician
Jiang Jinfu	Actor, model
Anthony Mackie	Actor
Romeo Miller (3)	Actor
Hasan Minhaj	Actor, comedian
Nneka Ogwumike	WNBA player
Master P (2)	Actor, rapper
Candace Parker	WNBA player
Aarón Sánchez	Celebrity chef
Head coach: Michael Smith (ESPN host)
Assistant coach: Draymond Green (NBA player, Golden State Warriors)
Assistant coach: Rocsi Diaz (TV personality)

=== 2018 ===
The 2018 NBA All-Star Celebrity Game was played on Friday, February 16, 2018, at the Los Angeles Convention Center. In honor of Los Angeles as host city, the two teams were named after its two NBA teams, with Rachel Nichols coaching Team Lakers and Katie Nolan coaching Team Clippers.

ESPN

February 16, 2018
7:00 pm ET

Team Lakers 66, Team Clippers 75
Scoring by quarter: 13–19, 17–18, 19–17, 17–21

Los Angeles Convention Center, Los Angeles, California

Team Lakers
Player	Background
Justin Bieber (2)	Singer
Steelo Brim	TV personality, host, actor
Nick Cannon (10)	TV personality, actor, rapper
Terence Crawford	Boxer
Rachel DeMita (2)	NBA 2KTV personality
Jerry Ferrara	Actor
Flea	Musician
Michael B. Jordan (2)	Actor
Marc Lasry (3)	Milwaukee Bucks owner
Tracy McGrady (2)	Former NBA player
Caleb McLaughlin (2)	Actor
Candace Parker (2)	WNBA player
Nate Robinson	Former NBA player
Drew Scott (3)	Actor
Kris Wu (3)	Actor, rapper
Head coach: Rachel Nichols (ESPN host)
Assistant coach: Tracy McGrady (former NBA player, ESPN analyst)
Assistant coach: Michael B. Jordan (actor)

Team Clippers
Player	Background
Anthony Anderson (4)	Actor
Brandon Armstrong (2)	Social media star, former NBA D-League player
Miles Brown	Actor
Win Butler (4)	Musician
Common (7)	Rapper, actor
Andre De Grasse	Olympic sprinter
Stefanie Dolson	WNBA player
Jamie Foxx (3)	Actor, comedian, singer
Paul Pierce	Former NBA player
Dascha Polanco	Actress
Quavo	Rapper, recording artist
Offset	Rapper
Bubba Watson	Golfer
Jason Williams (2)	Former NBA player
Head coach: Katie Nolan (ESPN host)
Assistant coach: Paul Pierce (former NBA player)
Assistant coach: Common (rapper, actor)

=== 2019 ===
The 2019 NBA All-Star Celebrity Game was played on Friday, February 15, 2019, at the Bojangles' Coliseum in Charlotte, North Carolina. The Home team featured personnel who either was born, raised, and/or played in North Carolina or South Carolina. Both teams had one "Hometown Hero" on their roster honoring exemplary citizens who rose to the occasion to help save others in the time of need. Playing for the Home Team was Jason Weinmann, a 47-year-old U.S. Marine who used his own military transport vehicle to rescue New Bern, North Carolina residents stranded during Hurricane Florence in 2018. Playing for the Away Team was James Shaw Jr., a 29-year-old electrical technician who disarmed a gunman armed with an AR-15 style rifle during the Nashville Waffle House shooting in Antioch, Tennessee. The 2019 Celebrity All-Star Game MVP was won by Famous Los, who scored 22 points, 2 rebounds, and 3 assists.

ESPN

February 15, 2019
7:00 pm ET

Away Team 80, Home Team 82
Scoring by quarter: 22–30, 25–21, 7–21, 26–10
Pts: Quavo 27; Rebs: Quavo, Allen 9	Pts: Famous Los 22; Rebs: Colter 6

Bojangles' Coliseum, Charlotte, North Carolina

Away
Player	Background
Ronnie 2K	Director of influencer marketing, 2K Sports
Ray Allen	Former NBA Player
AJ Buckley	Actor
Bad Bunny	Rapper
Stefanie Dolson (2)	WNBA player
Marc Lasry (4)	Milwaukee Bucks owner
Hasan Minhaj (2)	Actor, comedian
Quavo (2)	Rapper, recording artist
Adam Ray	About Last Night host
Amanda Seales	Actor, comedian, recording artist
James Shaw Jr.	Hometown hero
Brad Williams	About Last Night host
Head coach: Sue Bird (WNBA player)
Assistant coach: Monté Morris (NBA player)

Home
Player	Background
Mike Colter	Actor (Luke Cage)
Chris Daughtry	Singer, Daughtry
Terrence Jenkins (5)	TV personality, actor
Famous Los	Comedian, social media influencer
Dr. Oz (2)	TV personality
Rapsody	Rapper
Bo Rinehart	Musician, NEEDTOBREATHE
J.B. Smoove (2)	Actor, comedian (Curb Your Enthusiasm)
Steve Smith	Former NFL player
A'ja Wilson	WNBA player
Jay Williams	ESPN analyst, former NBA player
Jason Weismann	Hometown hero
Head coach: Dawn Staley (South Carolina Gamecocks women's basketball head coach)
Assistant coach: Lisa Boyer (South Carolina Gamecocks women's basketball associate head coach)

== 2020s ==
=== 2020 ===
The 2020 NBA All-Star Celebrity Game was played on Friday, February 14, 2020, at the Wintrust Arena in Chicago, Illinois. The coaches for the 2020 game were First Take analyst Stephen A. Smith and Pardon the Interruption co-host Michael Wilbon. Team Wilbon defeated Team Stephen A. 62–47 and Common took home the MVP award with 10 points, 5 rebounds and 5 assists.

Nate Robinson joined Team Stephen A. for the second half, while Horace Grant joined Team Wilbon. Former Secretary of Education Arne Duncan was a late addition to Team Wilbon. Smith also received the first technical for a head coach in Celebrity Game History.

ESPN

February 14, 2020
7:00 pm ET

Team Stephen A. 47, Team Wilbon 62

Wintrust Arena, Chicago, Illinois

Team Stephen A.
Player	Background
Ronnie 2K (2)	Marketing director at 2K Sports
Anthony "Spice" Adams	AKA Cream E. Biggums, actor, comedian, former NFL defensive tackle
Taylor Bennett	Rapper, recording artist
LaRoyce Hawkins	Actor (Chicago P.D.)
Lil Rel Howery	Actor, comedian
Marc Lasry (5)	Milwaukee Bucks co-owner
Darius Miles	Former NBA player
Katelyn Ohashi	Gymnast
Quavo (3)	Rapper, recording artist
Chance the Rapper	Rapper, recording artist
A'ja Wilson (2)	WNBA player
Head coach: Stephen A. Smith (ESPN commentator)
Assistant coach: Guy Fieri (TV host and chef)

Team Wilbon
Player	Background
Chef José Andrés	Chef & humanitarian
Jon Batiste	Musician, bandleader (The Late Show with Stephen Colbert)
Kane Brown	4x AMA award-winning artist
Bad Bunny (2)	Rapper
Hannibal Buress	Actor, comedian
Common (8)	Rapper, recording artist
Chelsea Gray	WNBA player
Jidenna	Recording artist
Famous Los (2)	Comedian, social media influencer
Alex Moffat	Actor and comedian (Saturday Night Live)
Quentin Richardson (2)	Former NBA player
Head coach: Michael Wilbon (ESPN commentator)
Assistant coach: Jesse Williams (Actor (Grey's Anatomy))

=== 2022 ===
The 2022 NBA All-Star Celebrity Game was played on Friday, February 18, 2022, at the Wolstein Center in Cleveland, Ohio. The coaches for the 2022 game were NBA legends Bill Walton and Dominique Wilkins. Team Walton defeated Team Nique 65–51 and Alex Toussaint took home the MVP award with 18 points.

ESPN

February 18, 2022
7:00 pm ET

Team Walton 65, Team Nique 51

Wolstein Center, Cleveland, Ohio

Team Walton
Player	Background
Jimmie Allen	Singer, songwriter
Brittney Elena	Host, actress, athlete and model
Machine Gun Kelly	Rapper, songwriter
Dearica Hamby	WNBA player
Noah Carlock	Fanatics All-In Challenge winner
Kareem Hunt	NFL player
Matt James	ABC's The Bachelor
Quavo (4)	Rapper, recording artist
Ranveer Singh	Actor
Alex Toussaint	Peloton instructor
Anderson Varejão	Former NBA player
Head coach: Bill Walton (NBA legends)

Team Nique
Player	Background
Anuel AA	Singer
Justin Bibb	Mayor of Cleveland
Kane Brown (2)	4x AMA award-winning artist
Myles Garrett	NFL player
Daniel Gibson	Former NBA player
Tiffany Haddish	Comedian, actress and author
Jack Harlow	Rapper, recording artist
Crissa Jackson	Harlem Globetrotters player
Anjali Ranadivé	Singer, songwriter
Gianmarco Tamberi	Olympic high jump champion
Head coach: Dominique Wilkins (NBA legends)

=== 2023 ===
The 2023 NBA All-Star Celebrity Game was played on Friday, February 17, 2023, at the Jon M. Huntsman Center in Salt Lake City, Utah. The captains for the 2023 were Utah Jazz team governor Ryan Smith and NBA legend and Jazz minority owner Dwyane Wade.

The game featured several new features and rules; a four-point field goal line was added, and the coaches could each activate a two-minute "Crunch Time" period in which all points are doubled. The game ended with an attempted half-court buzzer beater that went into the bucket by The Miz, which would've won the game as a four-point field goal; it was, however, the field goal was disallowed as it was shot slightly after the buzzer.

ESPN

February 17, 2023
7:00 pm ET

Team Ryan 78, Team Dwyane 81

Jon M. Huntsman Center, Salt Lake City, Utah

Team Ryan
Player	Background
Kane Brown (3)	5x AMA award-winning artist
Cordae	Rapper, recording artist
Diamond DeShields	WNBA player
Calvin Johnson	Former NFL player
Marcos Mion	TV host
The Miz	Professional wrestler
Albert Pujols	Former MLB player
Everett Osborne	Actor
Ozuna	Rapper, recording artist
Guillermo Rodriguez	ABC's Jimmy Kimmel Live correspondent
Sinqua Walls	Actor
Honorary Captain: Ryan Smith (Utah Jazz governor)
Head coach: Lisa Leslie (former WNBA player)
Assistant coach: Fat Joe (rapper and actor)
Assistant coach: Alex Bregman (MLB player)

Team Dwyane
Player	Background
Nicky Jam	Latin global music icon and actor
Jesser	YouTuber
Simu Liu	Actor
Hasan Minhaj (3)	Comedian
DK Metcalf	NFL player
Janelle Monáe	Actress, singer, songwriter
Arike Ogunbowale	WNBA player
21 Savage	Rapper, recording artist
Ranveer Singh (2)	Actor
Frances Tiafoe	Tennis player
Alex Toussaint (2)	Athlete
Honorary Captain: Dwyane Wade (Utah Jazz minority owner and NBA legend)
Head coach: Giannis Antetokounmpo (NBA player)
Assistant coach: Alex Antetokounmpo (NBA G League player)
Assistant coach: Thanasis Antetokounmpo (NBA player)
Assistant coach: Lindsey Vonn (3x Olympic-medalist skier)

=== 2024 ===
The 2024 NBA All-Star Celebrity Game was held on Friday, February 16, 2024, at the Lucas Oil Stadium in Indianapolis, Indiana, with First Take personalities Shannon Sharpe and Stephen A. Smith serving as honorary coaches. The "Crunch Time" (each team receiving the ability to activate two minutes of double-points) and four-point line rules introduced at the previous year's game returned.

ESPN

February 16, 2024
7:00 pm ET

Recap

Team Shannon 100, Team Stephen A. 91
Scoring by quarter: 22–26, 30–19, 20–26, 28–20
Pts: Micah Parsons 37; Rebs: Micah Parsons 16; Asts: Puka Nacua 4	Pts: C. J. Stroud 31; Rebs: Tristan Jass 10; Asts: Tristan Jass 6

Lucas Oil Stadium, Indianapolis, Indiana

Team Shannon
Player	Background
Micah Parsons	NFL player
Conor Daly	Racing driver
Quincy Isaiah	Actor
Jewell Loyd	WNBA player
Kai Cenat	Streamer
Dylan Wang	Actor
Lilly Singh	Actress
Sir	Singer/songwriter
Walker Hayes	Country singer
Anuel AA (2)	Singer
Puka Nacua	NFL player
Head coach: Shannon Sharpe (former NFL player)
Assistant coach: 50 Cent (rapper and actor)

Team Stephen A.
Player	Background
Jennifer Hudson	Actress, producer, and talk show host
Metta Sandiford-Artest	Former NBA player
Jack Ryan	Basketball entertainer
AJ McLean	Singer
C. J. Stroud	NFL player
Kwame Onwuachi	Chef
Natasha Cloud	WNBA player
Adam Blackstone	Musician
Gianmarco Tamberi (2)	Olympic high jump champion
Tristan Jass	YouTuber
Mecole Hardman	NFL player
Head coach: Stephen A. Smith (sports television personality and journalist)
Assistant coaches: Lil Wayne (rapper and songwriter) and A'ja Wilson (WNBA player)

=== 2025 ===
The 2025 NBA All-Star Celebrity Game was held on Friday, February 14, 2025, at the Oakland Arena in Oakland, California, with NFL legend Jerry Rice and MLB legend Barry Bonds serving as honorary coaches. The "Crunch Time" (each team receiving the ability to activate two minutes of double-points) and four-point line rules introduced returned.

ESPN

February 14, 2025
7:00 pm ET

Recap

Team Bonds 66, Team Rice 55
Scoring by quarter: 10–10, 21–15, 16–10, 19–20
Pts: Rome Flynn 22; Rebs: Flynn, Baron Davis, Tucker Halpern 8 Asts: Flynn, Davis 5	Pts: Terrell Owens 18; Rebs: Owens 6 Asts: Walker Hayes 4

Oakland Arena, Oakland, California

Team Bonds
Player	Background
Kai Cenat (2)	Online streamer, YouTuber, and influencer
Baron Davis (2)	Former NBA player
Rome Flynn	Actor
Rickea Jackson	WNBA player
Mickey Guyton	Singer, songwriter
Tucker Halpern	Musician
Noah Kahan	Singer/songwriter
Danny Ramirez	Actor
Masai Russell	Olympic sprinter
Pablo Schreiber	Actor
Dylan Wang (2)	Actor
Head coach: Barry Bonds (former MLB player)
Assistant coach: 2 Chainz (rapper and actor)

Team Rice
Player	Background
Matt Barnes	Former NBA player
Bayley	Professional wrestler
Chris Brickley	Basketball trainer
AP Dhillon	Singer, songwriter
Druski	Comedian, actor, and influencer
Walker Hayes (2)	Singer, songwriter
Shelby McEwen	Olympic High Jumper
Terrell Owens (4)	Former NFL player
Shaboozey	Singer, songwriter
Oliver Stark	Actor
Kayla Thornton	WNBA player
Head coach: Jerry Rice (Former NFL player)
Assistant coaches: Khaby Lame (YouTuber)

=== 2026 ===
The 2026 NBA All-Star Celebrity Game was held on Friday, February 13, 2026, at the Kia Forum in Inglewood, California. It featured a special halftime performance by CORTIS, marking the first Celebrity Game Halftime performance by a K-pop artist.

ESPN

February 13, 2026
7:00 pm ET

Recap

Team Giannis 65, Team Anthony 58
Scoring by quarter: 14–16, 12–18, 15–8, 24–16

Kia Forum, Inglewood, California

Team Giannis
Player	Background
Cafu	Former soccer player
Jenna Bandy	Influencer
Shams Charania	Sports reporter
Tacko Fall	Former NBA player
Rome Flynn (2)	Actor
Glorilla	Rapper
Keegan-Michael Key	Actor, comedian
Jeremy Lin	Former NBA player
Rick Schnall	Businessman
Amon-Ra St. Brown	Detroit Lions wide receiver
Dylan Wang (3)	Actor
Coaches: Alex Antetokounmpo (Milwaukee Bucks forward), Giannis Antetokounmpo (Milwaukee Bucks forward), Thanasis Antetokounmpo (Milwaukee Bucks forward), Mookie Betts (Los Angeles Dodgers shortstop)

Team Anthony
Player	Background
Keenan Allen	Los Angeles Chargers wide receiver
Badshah	Rapper
Andre De Grasse (2)	Sprinter
Mat Ishbia	Businessman, owner of the Phoenix Suns
Cody Jones	Member of Dude Perfect
Simu Liu (2)	Actor
Mustard	Record producer
Adrien Nunez	Influencer
Taylor Frankie Paul	Influencer
Nicolas Vansteenberghe	Influencer
Jason Williams (3)	Former NBA player
Coaches: Anthony Anderson (actor and comedian), Chris Brickley (NBA player development coach), Lethal Shooter (NBA shooting coach)
