= 2024 NBA All-Star Game =

Exhibition basketball game

	1	2	3	4	Total
West	47	42	47	50	186
East	53	51	56	51	211
- Date: February 18, 2024
- Arena: Gainbridge Fieldhouse (All-Star Game); Lucas Oil Stadium (All-Star Saturday Night)
- City: Indianapolis
- MVP: Damian Lillard (East)
- National anthem: Babyface (American); Charlotte Cardin (Canadian)
- Halftime show: Jennifer Hudson
- Attendance: 17,251
- Network: TNT; TBS (as all-star game) truTV (alternate broadcasts)
- Announcers: Brian Anderson, Reggie Miller, Candace Parker, and Allie LaForce (All-Star Game, TNT and TBS); Taylor Rooks, Charles Barkley, Draymond Green, and Jamal Crawford (All-Star Game Alt-Cast, truTV); Kevin Harlan, Reggie Miller, Kenny Smith, Shaquille O'Neal, and Allie LaForce (All-Star Saturday Night, TNT); Adam Lefkoe, Vince Carter, Carmelo Anthony, Jayson Tatum, and Chris Haynes (All-Star Saturday Night Alt-Cast, truTV); Adam Lefkoe, Candace Parker, Jamal Crawford, Tyrese Haliburton, and Chris Haynes (Rising Stars Tournament, TNT)

NBA All-Star Game
< 2023	2025 >

The 2024 NBA All-Star Game was an exhibition basketball game played on February 18, 2024, during the National Basketball Association's 2023–24 season. It was the 73rd edition of the NBA All-Star Game. It was hosted by the Indiana Pacers at Gainbridge Fieldhouse. This was the second time that Indianapolis hosted the All-Star Game; the last time the game was played in the city was in 1985 at the Hoosier Dome. This year's All-Star Game featured the return of the Eastern Conference versus Western Conference format that was last used in 2017. The game was televised by TNT for the 22nd consecutive year. All-Star Voting began on December 19, 2023, and ended on January 20, 2024.

The Eastern Conference defeated the Western Conference 211–186. This was the most points ever scored by a team at an All-Star Game, and the most combined points scored by both teams (397), as well as the first time a team scored 200 or more points in an All-Star Game. The Eastern conference made 42 three point field goals, breaking the previous record of 35 made threes set by Team LeBron in the 2019 All-Star Game. The teams made a combined 67 three-point field goals, also a record.

== Background ==
The announcement of the site selection was initially made on December 13, 2017, at a press conference held by the Indiana Pacers. In attendance at the announcement were NBA commissioner Adam Silver, Pacers owner Herb Simon, Indiana governor Eric Holcomb, and Indianapolis mayor Joe Hogsett. The team had submitted its bid for the game with then-team president and NBA legend Larry Bird delivering the bid in a specially liveried Dallara IR-07. On November 25, 2020, the NBA announced that the Pacers would host the All-Star Game in 2024 instead of 2021 due to NBA schedule changes as a result of the COVID-19 pandemic and schedule conflicts with the 2021 NCAA Division I men's basketball tournament, which was held in several venues around Indianapolis and central Indiana. The city of Indianapolis hoped to see an 8-figure ($10,000,000) economic impact surrounding the game.

Additional events including a celebrity game and practices open to the public were held at the adjacent Indiana Convention Center, while all Saturday night events took place at Lucas Oil Stadium; the stadium setup utilized a glass basketball court manufactured by ASB GlassFloor, which featured an LED display under the playing surface that could display animations, video, and interactive graphics and visual effects.

== Format change ==
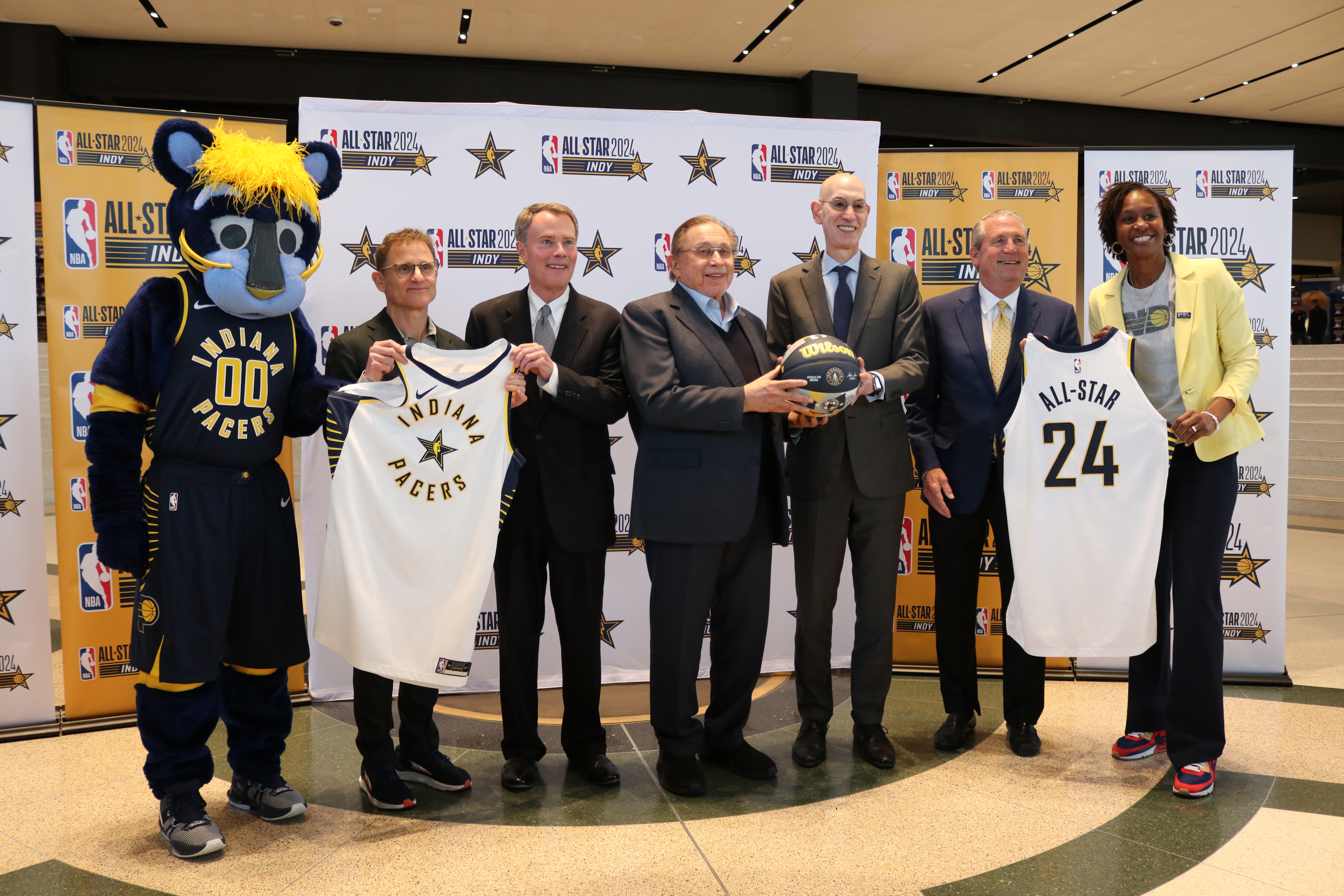
NBA All-Star 2024 Press Conference on October 25, 2023

On October 25, 2023, NBA Commissioner Adam Silver announced that the 2024 All-Star Game would return to the Eastern Conference versus Western Conference format that was last used in the 2017 NBA All-Star Game, alongside the removal of the 24-point Elam Ending that was first used in 2020. The charity aspect would be retained, with the team that scores the most points in each quarter winning a cash prize that would go to their chosen charity.

== All-Star Game ==
=== Coaches ===
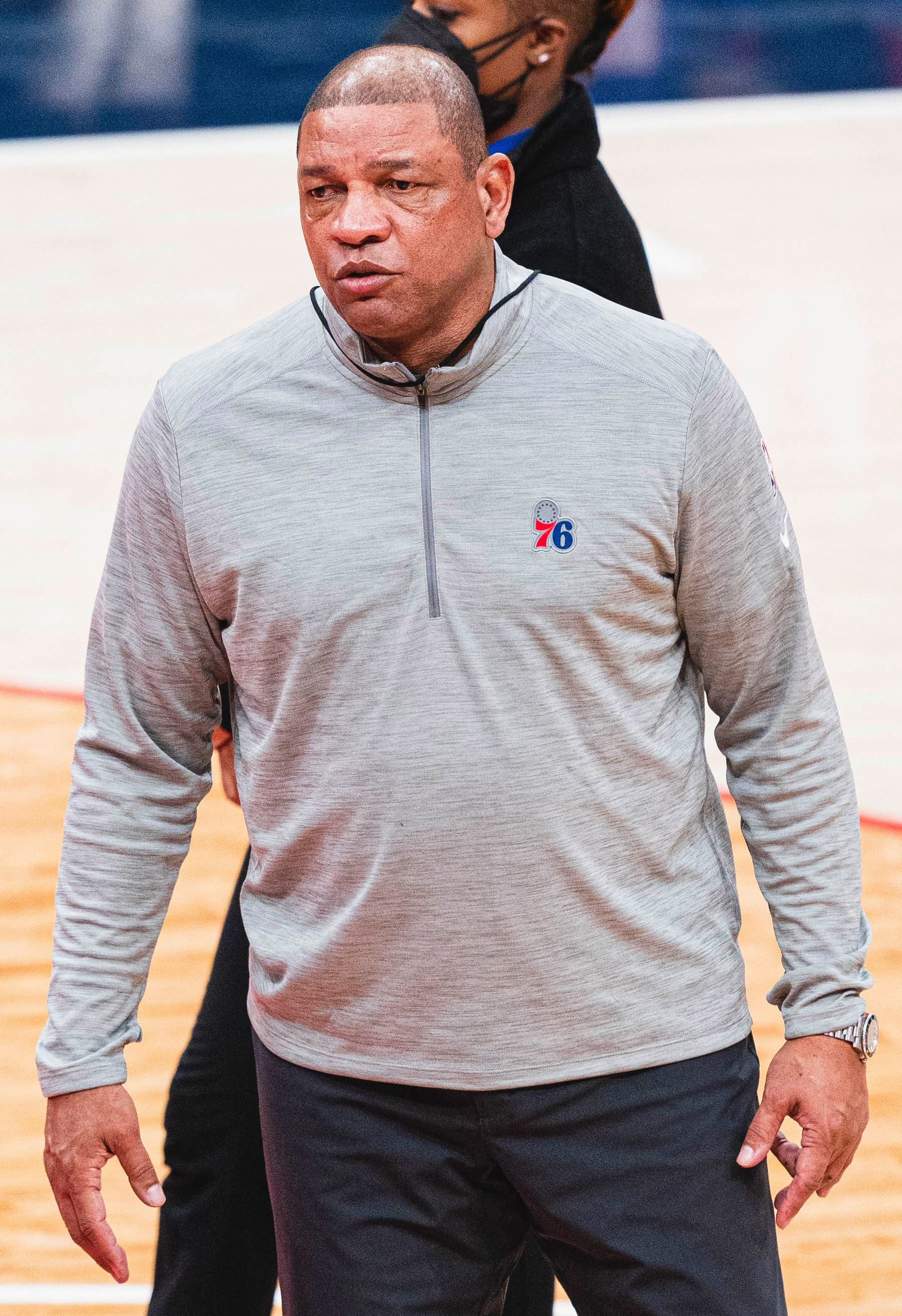
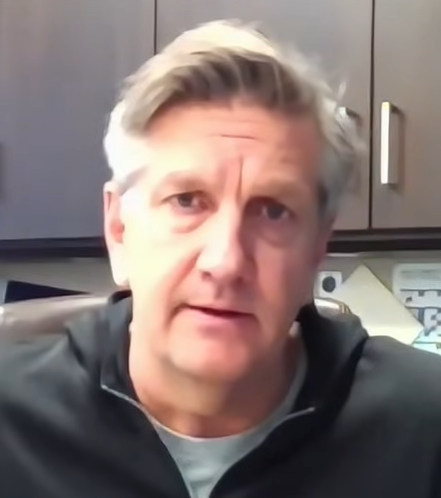
Milwaukee Bucks' Doc Rivers (left) and Minnesota Timberwolves' Chris Finch (right) were selected as the East and West coach, respectively.

Doc Rivers, head coach of the Milwaukee Bucks for five games after the firing of Adrian Griffin, qualified as the head coach of Eastern All-Stars on February 3. Although the Boston Celtics clinched the best record in the Eastern Conference, their head coach, Joe Mazzulla, was ineligible to coach in the All-Star Game because he had coached in the 2023 game and league rules prohibited a coach from coaching in consecutive All-Star Games. Chris Finch, head coach of the Western Conference leader Minnesota Timberwolves, qualified as the head coach of Western All-Stars on February 4.

=== Rosters ===
As had been the case in previous years, the rosters for the All-Star Game were selected through a voting process. The fans could vote through the NBA website as well as through their Google account. The starters were chosen by the fans, media, and current NBA players. Fans made up 50% of the vote, and NBA players and media each comprised 25% of the vote. The two guards and three frontcourt players who received the highest cumulative vote totals in each conferences were named the All-Star starters and the two players in each conference with the highest votes were named team captains. NBA head coaches voted for the reserves for their respective conferences, none of which could be players from their own team. Each coach selected two guards, three frontcourt players and two wild cards, with each selected player ranked in order of preference within each category. If a multi-position player was to be selected, coaches were encouraged to vote for the player at the position that was "most advantageous for the All-Star team", regardless of where the player was listed on the All-Star ballot or the position he was listed in box scores.

The All-Star Game starters were announced on January 25, 2024. Tyrese Haliburton of the Indiana Pacers and Damian Lillard of the Milwaukee Bucks were announced as the starting guards in the East, earning their second and eighth all-star appearances respectively. Giannis Antetokounmpo of the Milwaukee Bucks and Jayson Tatum of the Boston Celtics were named the frontcourt starters in the East, earning their eighth and fifth all-star appearances respectively. Joining the East frontcourt was Joel Embiid of the Philadelphia 76ers, his seventh selection.

In the West, Luka Dončić of the Dallas Mavericks and Shai Gilgeous-Alexander of the Oklahoma City Thunder were named to the starting backcourt, earning their fifth and second all-star appearances respectively. In the frontcourt, Kevin Durant of the Phoenix Suns and LeBron James of the Los Angeles Lakers were named to their 14th and 20th all-star appearances respectively. James' 20th All-Star selection set an NBA record for most All-Star selections, breaking a record he previously shared with Kareem Abdul-Jabbar. With his selection, James also joins the short list of players with 20 or more All-Star selections which includes Hall of Fame hockey player Gordie Howe and Baseball Hall of Famers Hank Aaron, Willie Mays, Mickey Mantle, and Stan Musial. Joining the West frontcourt was Nikola Jokić of the Denver Nuggets, earning his sixth selection.

The All-Star Game reserves were announced on February 1, 2024. The West reserves included Devin Booker of the Phoenix Suns, his fourth selection; Stephen Curry of the Golden State Warriors, his tenth selection; Anthony Davis of the Los Angeles Lakers, his ninth selection; Anthony Edwards of the Minnesota Timberwolves, his second selection; Paul George of the Los Angeles Clippers, his ninth selection; Kawhi Leonard of the Los Angeles Clippers, his sixth selection; and Karl-Anthony Towns of the Minnesota Timberwolves, his fourth selection.

The East reserves included Bam Adebayo of the Miami Heat, his third selection; Paolo Banchero of the Orlando Magic, his first selection; Jaylen Brown of the Boston Celtics, his third selection; Jalen Brunson of the New York Knicks, his first selection; Tyrese Maxey of the Philadelphia 76ers, his first selection; Donovan Mitchell of the Cleveland Cavaliers, his fifth selection; and Julius Randle of the New York Knicks, his third selection.

After injuries were reported from Joel Embiid and Julius Randle, the NBA announced that Trae Young of the Atlanta Hawks and Scottie Barnes of the Toronto Raptors would replace them on the Eastern Conference All-Star roster.

- Italics indicates leading vote-getters per conference

Eastern Conference All-Stars
Pos	Player	Team	No. of selections
Starters
G	Tyrese Haliburton	Indiana Pacers	2
G	Damian Lillard	Milwaukee Bucks	8
F	Giannis Antetokounmpo	Milwaukee Bucks	8
F	Jayson Tatum	Boston Celtics	5
C	Joel Embiid^{INJ1}	Philadelphia 76ers	7
Reserves
G	Jalen Brunson	New York Knicks	1
G	Tyrese Maxey	Philadelphia 76ers	1
G	Donovan Mitchell	Cleveland Cavaliers	5
G	Trae Young^{REP1}	Atlanta Hawks	3
F	Paolo Banchero	Orlando Magic	1
F	Scottie Barnes^{REP2}	Toronto Raptors	1
F	Jaylen Brown	Boston Celtics	3
F	Julius Randle^{INJ2}	New York Knicks	3
C	Bam Adebayo^{ST1}	Miami Heat	3
Head coach: Doc Rivers (Milwaukee Bucks)

Western Conference All-Stars
Pos	Player	Team	No. of selections
Starters
G	Luka Dončić	Dallas Mavericks	5
G	Shai Gilgeous-Alexander	Oklahoma City Thunder	2
F	Kevin Durant	Phoenix Suns	14
F	LeBron James	Los Angeles Lakers	20
C	Nikola Jokić	Denver Nuggets	6
Reserves
G	Devin Booker	Phoenix Suns	4
G	Stephen Curry	Golden State Warriors	10
G	Anthony Edwards	Minnesota Timberwolves	2
F	Paul George	Los Angeles Clippers	9
F	Kawhi Leonard	Los Angeles Clippers	6
F	Karl-Anthony Towns	Minnesota Timberwolves	4
C	Anthony Davis	Los Angeles Lakers	9
Head coach: Chris Finch (Minnesota Timberwolves)

^INJ1 Joel Embiid was unable to play due to a leg injury.
^INJ2 Julius Randle was unable to play due to a shoulder injury.
^REP1 Trae Young was selected as Joel Embiid's replacement.
^REP2 Scottie Barnes was selected as Julius Randle's replacement.
^ST1 Bam Adebayo was selected to start in place of Joel Embiid.

=== Game ===
The 2024 All-Star Game reverted to the pre-2018 format, with two teams representing the two conferences playing in four 12-minute quarters. The charity aspect was retained, in which the team that scored the most points in each quarter received a cash prize that would be donated to a designated charity.

The Eastern Conference All-Stars won the game, 211–186, the Eastern Conference's first win in the All-Star Game since 2014. The game broke numerous records: It was the first NBA All-Star Game in which a team reached the 200-point mark. Tyrese Haliburton made a three-pointer to reach the milestone. The East and the West scored a combined total of 397 points, eclipsing the previous record of 374 set in 2017, with the East hitting a new record 42 3-pointers, breaking the previous mark of 35 set by Team LeBron in 2019. Entering halftime, both teams had scored a combined 193 points, narrowly beating the previous record of 191 set the previous year, with the East tying its individual team record with 104. Damian Lillard of the Milwaukee Bucks, in his first All-Star Game as a starter, was named the NBA All-Star Game MVP. Having previously won the Three-Point Contest, he was the first player to win the Three-Point Contest and the All-Star Game MVP in the same weekend.

TNT, TBS, truTV

February 18, 2024
8:00 pm ET

Recap

Western Conference 186, Eastern Conference 211
Scoring by quarter: 47–53, 42–51, 47–56, 50–51
Pts: Karl-Anthony Towns 50; Rebs: Anthony Davis 8 Asts: Nikola Jokić 9	Pts: Damian Lillard 39; Rebs: Paolo Banchero 9 Asts: Trae Young 7

Gainbridge Fieldhouse, Indianapolis, Indiana
Attendance: 17,251
Referees:
- #25 Tony Brothers
- #58 Josh Tiven
- #11 Derrick Collins

== All-Star Weekend ==
=== Celebrity Game ===
The 2024 NBA All-Star Celebrity Game was held on Friday, February 16, 2024, at the Lucas Oil Stadium in Indianapolis, Indiana, with First Take personalities Shannon Sharpe and Stephen A. Smith serving as honorary coaches. The "Crunch Time" (each team receiving the ability to activate two minutes of double-points) and four-point line rules introduced at the previous year's game returned.

ESPN

February 16, 2024
7:00 pm ET

Recap

Team Shannon 100, Team Stephen A. 91
Scoring by quarter: 22–26, 30–19, 20–26, 28–20
Pts: Micah Parsons 37; Rebs: Micah Parsons 16; Asts: Puka Nacua 4	Pts: C. J. Stroud 31; Rebs: Tristan Jass 10; Asts: Tristan Jass 6

Lucas Oil Stadium, Indianapolis, Indiana

Team Shannon
Player	Background
Micah Parsons	NFL player
Conor Daly	Racing driver
Quincy Isaiah	Actor
Jewell Loyd	WNBA player
Kai Cenat	Streamer
Dylan Wang	Actor
Lilly Singh	Actress
Sir	Singer/songwriter
Walker Hayes	Country singer
Anuel AA (2)	Singer
Puka Nacua	NFL player
Head coach: Shannon Sharpe (former NFL player)
Assistant coach: 50 Cent (rapper and actor)

Team Stephen A.
Player	Background
Jennifer Hudson	Actress, producer, and talk show host
Metta Sandiford-Artest	Former NBA player
Jack Ryan	Basketball entertainer
AJ McLean	Singer
C. J. Stroud	NFL player
Kwame Onwuachi	Chef
Natasha Cloud	WNBA player
Adam Blackstone	Musician
Gianmarco Tamberi (2)	Olympic high jump champion
Tristan Jass	YouTuber
Mecole Hardman	NFL player
Head coach: Stephen A. Smith (sports television personality and journalist)
Assistant coaches: Lil Wayne (rapper and songwriter) and A'ja Wilson (WNBA player)

=== Rising Stars Challenge ===
Team Pau
Pos.	Player	Team	R/S/P
F	Victor Wembanyama	San Antonio Spurs	Rookie
F	Brandon Miller	Charlotte Hornets	Rookie
F	Jaime Jaquez Jr.	Miami Heat	Rookie
F	Jabari Smith Jr.	Houston Rockets	Sophomore
G	Brandin Podziemski	Golden State Warriors	Rookie
G	Cason Wallace	Oklahoma City Thunder	Rookie
G	Bilal Coulibaly	Washington Wizards	Rookie
Honorary coach: Pau Gasol
Head coach: Micah Nori

Team Tamika
Pos.	Player	Team	R/S/P
F	Paolo Banchero	Orlando Magic	Sophomore
F	Keegan Murray	Sacramento Kings	Sophomore
G	Jaden Ivey	Detroit Pistons	Sophomore
G	Dyson Daniels^{INJ2}	New Orleans Pelicans	Sophomore
G	Vince Williams Jr.^{REP2}	Memphis Grizzlies	Sophomore
G	Scoot Henderson	Portland Trail Blazers	Rookie
G	Keyonte George	Utah Jazz	Rookie
C	Jalen Duren	Detroit Pistons	Sophomore
Honorary coach: Tamika Catchings
Head coach: Elston Turner

Team Jalen
Pos.	Player	Team	R/S/P
F	Chet Holmgren	Oklahoma City Thunder	Rookie
F	Dereck Lively II	Dallas Mavericks	Rookie
F	Jeremy Sochan^{REP1}	San Antonio Spurs	Sophomore
G	Jalen Williams	Oklahoma City Thunder	Sophomore
G	Bennedict Mathurin	Indiana Pacers	Sophomore
G	Shaedon Sharpe^{INJ1}	Portland Trail Blazers	Sophomore
G	Jordan Hawkins	New Orleans Pelicans	Rookie
C	Walker Kessler	Utah Jazz	Sophomore
Honorary coach: Jalen Rose
Head coach: Joe Prunty

Team Detlef
Pos.	Player	Team	R/S/P
F	Izan Almansa	G League Ignite	Prospect
F	Matas Buzelis	G League Ignite	Prospect
F	Ron Holland^{INJ3}	G League Ignite	Prospect
F	Tyler Smith	G League Ignite	Prospect
F	Oscar Tshiebwe	Indiana Mad Ants	Rookie
F	Emoni Bates^{REP3}	Cleveland Charge	Rookie
G	Mac McClung	Osceola Magic	Third-year player
G	Alondes Williams	Sioux Falls Skyforce	Sophomore
Honorary coach: Detlef Schrempf
Head coach: Patrick Mutombo

^INJ1 Shaedon Sharpe was unable to participate due to injury.
^REP1 Jeremy Sochan was selected as Shaedon Sharpe's replacement.
^INJ2 Dyson Daniels was unable to participate due to injury.
^REP2 Vince Williams Jr. was selected as Dyson Daniels's replacement.
^INJ3 Ron Holland was unable to participate due to injury.
^REP3 Emoni Bates was selected as Ron Holland's replacement.

Semifinals
Team Jalen	40
Team Tamika	35
Team Detlef	41
Team Pau	36

Final
Team Jalen	25
Team Detlef	13

=== Skills Challenge ===
Team Pacers
Pos.	Player	Team
G	Tyrese Haliburton	Indiana Pacers
F	Bennedict Mathurin	Indiana Pacers
C	Myles Turner	Indiana Pacers

Team Top Pick
Pos.	Player	Team
F	Paolo Banchero	Orlando Magic
G	Anthony Edwards	Minnesota Timberwolves
F	Victor Wembanyama	San Antonio Spurs

Team All-Stars
Pos.	Player	Team
F	Scottie Barnes	Toronto Raptors
G	Tyrese Maxey	Philadelphia 76ers
G	Trae Young	Atlanta Hawks

=== Three Point Contest ===
Contestants
Pos.	Player	Team	Height	Weight	First round (Tiebreaker)	Final round
G	Damian Lillard	Milwaukee Bucks	6–2	195	26 (16)	26
G	Trae Young	Atlanta Hawks	6–1	164	26 (15)	24
C	Karl-Anthony Towns	Minnesota Timberwolves	7–0	248	26 (16)	24
G	Tyrese Haliburton	Indiana Pacers	6–5	185	26 (12)	DNQ
F	Lauri Markkanen	Utah Jazz	7–0	240	25	DNQ
G	Jalen Brunson	New York Knicks	6–2	190	24	DNQ
G	Donovan Mitchell	Cleveland Cavaliers	6–3	215	21	DNQ
G	Malik Beasley	Milwaukee Bucks	6–4	187	20	DNQ

=== Stephen vs. Sabrina ===
Following the Three Point Contest on Saturday, February 17, Stephen Curry and Sabrina Ionescu competed in a bonus head-to-head 3-point challenge, the first such challenge pitting an NBA player against a WNBA player during All-Star Weekend (not considering team events). Ionescu had won the Three Point Contest during the 2023 WNBA All Star Weekend in Las Vegas with a second-round score of 37, which surpassed the NBA record of 31 that Curry set in 2021 in Atlanta and that Haliburton matched in 2023 in Salt Lake City.

Both players shot from the NBA 3-point line, but Curry used NBA-sized basketballs and Ionescu used WNBA-sized basketballs.

Contestants
Pos.	Player	Team	Height	Weight	Final round
G	Stephen Curry	Golden State Warriors	6–2	185	29
G	Sabrina Ionescu	New York Liberty	5–11	165	26

=== Slam Dunk Contest ===
Contestants
Pos.	Player	Team	Height	Weight	First round	Final round
G	Mac McClung	Osceola Magic^{NBA G League}	6–2	185	97.4 (48+49.4)	98.8 (48.8+50)
G	Jaylen Brown	Boston Celtics	6–6	223	96.4 (48.8+47.6)	97.8 (48.6+49.2)
F	Jacob Toppin	New York Knicks	6–8	200	95 (47.8+47.2)	DNQ
F	Jaime Jaquez Jr.	Miami Heat	6–6	225	94.2 (47.4+46.8)	DNQ
