= New Orleans Morial Convention Center =

Convention center in Louisiana, US

Coordinates: 29.939651°N 90.062871°W

Ernest N. Morial Convention Center
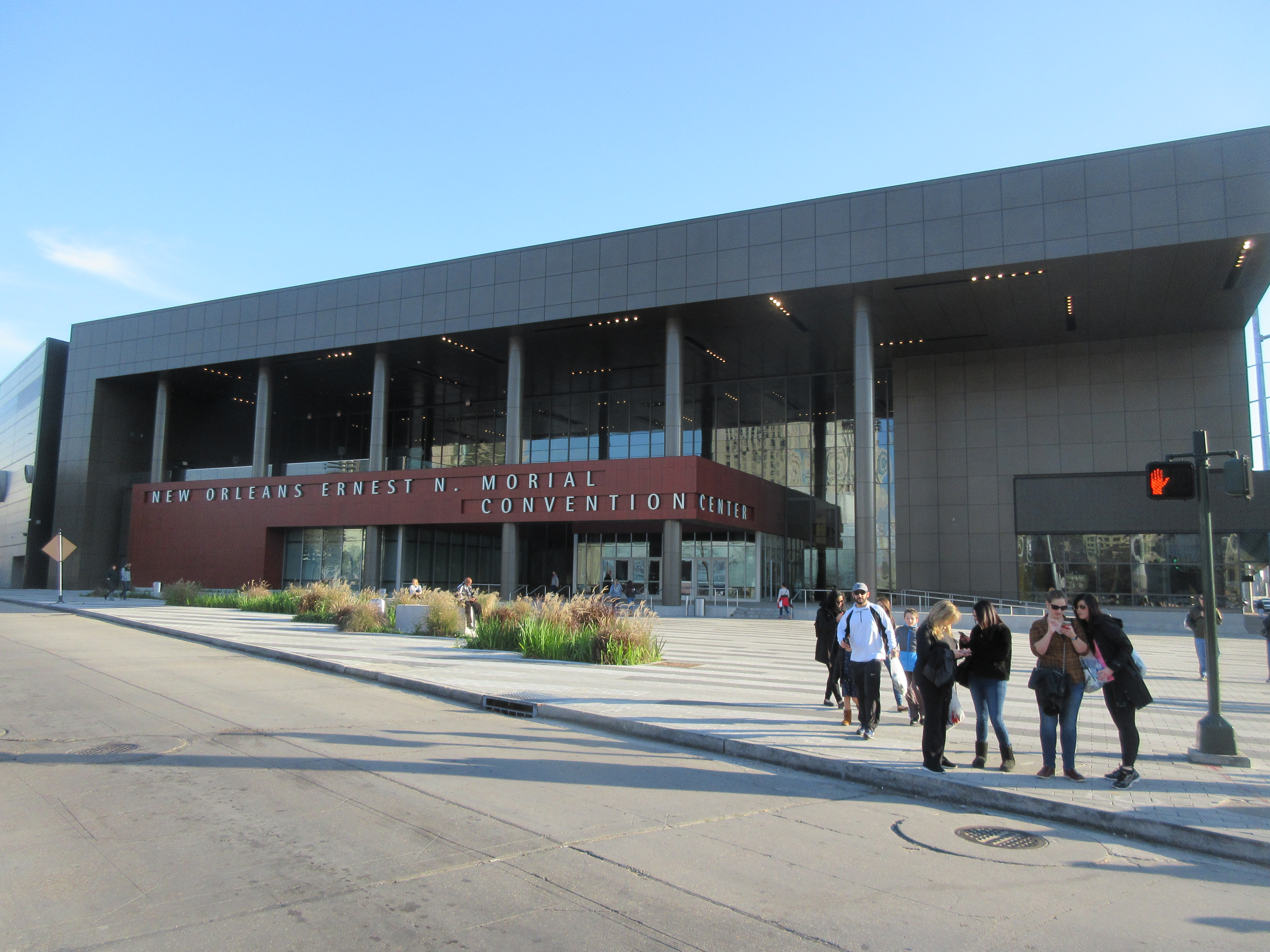
- Convention center seen from northwest corner
- Interactive map of Ernest N. Morial Convention Center
- Address: 900 Convention Center Blvd; New Orleans, LA 70130
- Owner: Ernest N. Morial New Orleans Exhibition Hall Authority
- Capacity: 4,032 (New Orleans Theater)

Construction
- Built: 1978–1984
- Opened: 1985
- Renovated: 2006, 2013, 2018–2029

Website
- www.mccno.com

The Ernest N. Morial Convention Center is located in Downtown New Orleans, Louisiana, United States. The lower end of building one is located 1,640 feet (500 m) upriver from Canal Street on the banks of the Mississippi River. It is named after former Mayor of New Orleans Ernest Nathan Morial.

It has about 1.1 million sq. ft. (102,000 m^{2}) of exhibit space, covering almost 11 blocks, and over 3 million sq. ft. (280,000 m^{2}) of total space, making it the seventh largest convention center in the United States. The front of the main building is 1 kilometer long.

== History ==
The center was planned starting in 1978. It is the fifth-largest facility of its kind in the United States, and as of early 2005 was the second-busiest. The first portion of the building was constructed as part of the 1984 Louisiana World Exposition; a series of additions in subsequent decades expanded the center further upriver. The complex was named in honor of Ernest N. Morial, the city's first African American mayor, in 1992. In 2008, the center was renamed the New Orleans Morial Convention Center in order to emphasize its New Orleans location.

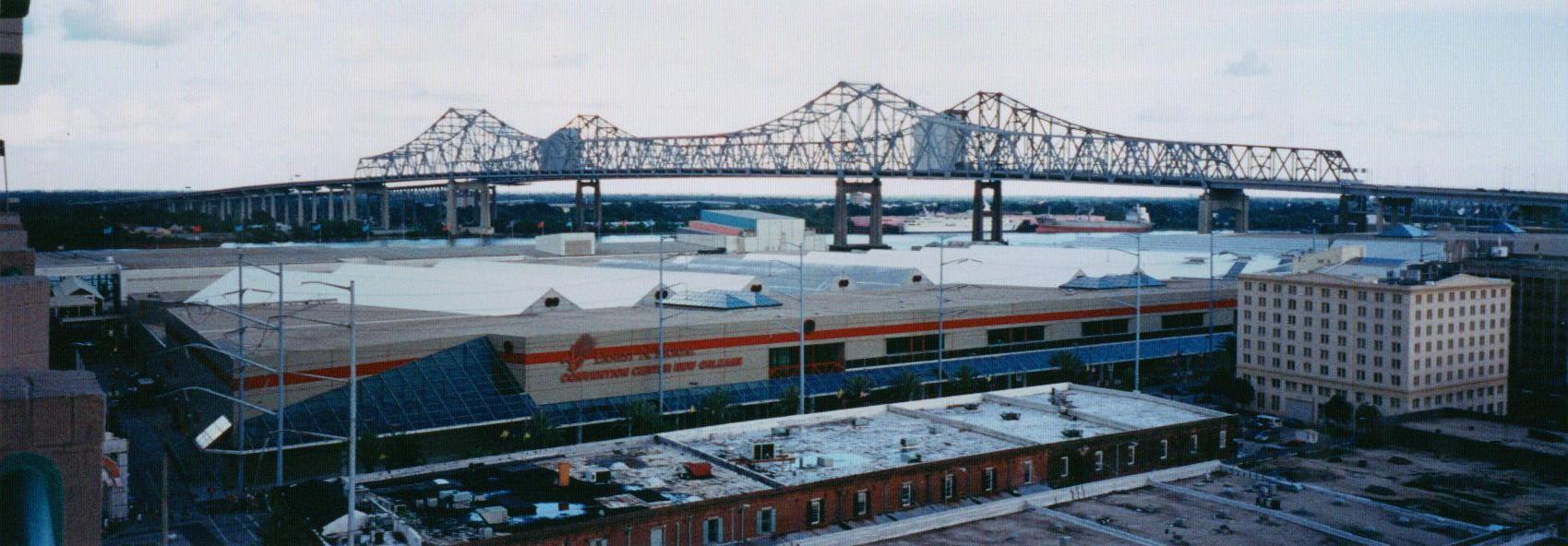
The New Orleans Morial Convention Center, and in the background, the Crescent City Connection bridge over the Mississippi River.

From August 26 through 27, 2005, Wheel of Fortune came to tape three weeks of shows at the convention center. But as Hurricane Katrina threatened the area, they canceled the last week in order to evacuate. In the aftermath of Katrina, the Convention Center was the second most important shelter for survivors, after the Louisiana Superdome. After serving as a temporary medical clinic for some time, the structure again began welcoming conventions in early 2006, including that of the American Library Association.

=== Hurricane Katrina ===
After Hurricane Katrina passed through the city in 2005, thousands of evacuees were directed to the Convention Center as an unofficial evacuation center. In the confusion following the disaster, people escaping from flooded neighborhoods were directed to the Convention Center by police and word of mouth, with the expectation that there would be provisions, aid, and evacuation buses there. However no such resources were there for several days.

Around 20,000–25,000 people gathered at the complex in difficult conditions with no power, no water, no food, no medical supplies, no proper sanitation, and with only minimal occasional law enforcement presence within the center, resulting in incidents of crime and gang violence. There were reports of multiple deaths at the center, from causes including violence, dehydration, and lack of medication for the ill.

The poor conditions and lack of prompt government response at the convention center were revealed to the nation on several TV news networks including CNN and Fox. Secretary of Homeland Security Michael Chertoff falsely claimed to be unaware of any problem with conditions even after the networks had been broadcasting images and live reports from the Convention Center. The Morial Convention Center was declared evacuated on September 4.

=== Post-Katrina ===
The Convention Center finished a complete renovation of the facility in November 2006. A previously scheduled expansion project, which would add 524,000 square feet (48,700 m^{2}) of exhibition space in a new building, has been temporarily delayed. The 2006 renovations included the creation of the 4,032-seat New Orleans Theater, a concert hall used primarily for concerts, Broadway stage shows, and other special events.

In 2013, the convention center completed a $52 million dollar revamp of Hall A into a 60,000 square feet (5,600 m^{2}) column free ballroom known as the Great Hall and 26,000 square feet (2,400 m^{2}) prefunction space. The renovation includes a new entrance on the Julia St. side

Since 2018, the Convention Center is currently undergoing a $557 million multi-phased renovation and upgrades includes new energy-efficient roofing system, technology upgrades in the meeting rooms, linear park, and lobby improvement with the completion date set for late 2029. On Jan. 30, the Ernest N. Morial New Orleans Exhibition Hall Authority approved a headquarters hotel development agreement and ground lease agreement with Omni Hotels & Resorts to develop a 1,000-room headquarters hotel and an additional 100,000 sq ft. meeting room, that will anchor the convention center

== Hosting events (and sports events) ==
- The Super Bowl Experience on January 30–February 3, 2013
- The 2014 NBA All-Star Game Jam Session, NBA All-Star Celebrity Game and NBA All-Star practice, were held at the convention center.
- PFL 8, a mixed martial arts event was held at the convention center on October 5, 2018.
- The 71st Miss Universe competition held on January 14, 2023.
- The Super Bowl Experience on February 5–8, 2025

== See also ==
- List of convention centers in the United States

Preceded by Universe Dome, Port of Eilat (Israel) Eilat	Miss Universe venue 2022	Succeeded by National Gymnasium (El Salvador) San Salvador
