= David Mulugheta =

American football agent

- Education: University of Texas; University of Nebraska College of Law
- Occupation: NFL agent
- Employer: Athletes First
- Children: 3
- Website: Athletesfirst.net

David Mulugheta is an American football agent at Athletes First in Laguna Hills, California. He currently represents 42 NFL players, including Jalen Ramsey, Deshaun Watson, Budda Baker, Michael Thomas, Jordan Love, AJ Terrell, Micah Parsons, and Kyle Pitts.

== Early life and education ==
Mulugheta was born in Dallas, Texas. His parents are Eritrean immigrants. His father worked two jobs, one as a taxi driver and another at a gas station. He attended the University of Texas at Austin as well as the University of Nebraska College of Law.

== Career ==
Mulugheta began his career as an intern at Athletes First in 2010, after meeting agent Andrew Kessler. Mulugheta became an NFLPA certified contract advisor in 2012 and became an agent at Athletes First. Since then, Mulugheta has gone on to represent many Pro Bowl and All-Pro players.

== Accolades ==
Mulugheta was recognized in 2020 by Forbes as the top NFL agent (in terms of negotiated deals and commissions) in the world, holding a rank of eighth across agents of any sport. He is also Forbes' highest ranked black sports agent.
