= Camouflage (2007 game show) =

- Directed by: Rob George
- Presented by: Roger Lodge
- Composer: Scooter Pietsch
- Country of origin: United States
- No. of seasons: 1
- No. of episodes: 40

Production
- Executive producers: Jonathan Barry; Terrence McDonnell
- Production companies: McB Entertainment; Enjoy the Ride Productions

Original release
- Network: Game Show Network
- Release: July 2 – July 27, 2007

Camouflage is an American television game show that aired on Game Show Network. Hosted by Roger Lodge, and billed as "the hidden word game where the answer is always right in front of you", Camouflage originally aired for 40 episodes from July 2 to 27, 2007. The show is a word game, with contestants searching for a hidden word or phrase in a string of jumbled letters. The show is produced by Enjoy the Ride Productions in association with McB Entertainment.

Originally, two shows aired per night at 7:00 and 7:30 PM Eastern time. However, on July 30 the second run was removed and replaced by Lingo while the airings moved to weeknights at 1:30 AM Eastern. On January 5, 2009, Wheel of Fortune took over its time slot.

== Gameplay ==
Three contestants are shown a jumble of letters which contains the answer within, spelled out in correct order (albeit with intervening or "decoy" letters). A clue is also provided to aid the contestants with the puzzle, but the clue is often indirect; most clues involve some sort of word play. Similar to Jeopardy! the show features puzzles titled "double" and "final" Camouflage.

As each puzzle is played, decoy letters are removed one at a time, making the answer easier to discern but reducing the total value by 10 points for each decoy latter that is removed; the process stops once there are no more decoy letters remaining or when the value of the puzzle reaches 10 points, whichever comes first. A contestant may buzz in at any time during a puzzle to give an answer. If correct, the answer is revealed, and the contestant is credited the point value of the puzzle at the time the guess is made. There is no point penalty for a wrong answer, but a contestant who is incorrect may not make any more guesses for that particular puzzle.

The game is played in three rounds. Gameplay is identical in each round, but the difficulty of the puzzles increases. Each puzzle in the first round has a starting value of 100 points, and each answer consists of a minimum of one word. The second round's puzzles are worth 200 points to start, and each answer consists of a minimum of two words. In addition, the first two letters that drop from each puzzle do not affect its value (they are "free letters"). In the third round, puzzles have a minimum of three words with a starting value of 300 points. Also, the first five letters drop from the puzzle without decreasing its value. At the end of the third round, the contestant with the highest score moves on to the endgame. If there is a tie, a tiebreaker puzzle is played using the Round 1 format.

All correct answers to all puzzles have letters that read from left to right.

=== Examples of puzzles ===
The following are actual puzzles used on the show.

- Round 1: Letters: MYNAMEISEARL Clue: "twang!" Answer: nasal
- Round 2: Letters: AMSTERDAM CLEAVERFAMILY Clue: Cruising altitude? Answer: sea level
- Round 3: Letters: IFTHEYREBOUNDING AROUNDTHEIR PARENTSTIELEASHES Clue: Television show about hyperactive children? Answer: The Young and the Restless

=== Double Camouflage ===
One puzzle in each round is designated as a "Double Camouflage" puzzle. The first part of these puzzles is played identically to the others. However, the contestant who solves the puzzle can double the point value by solving a secondary puzzle. The secondary puzzle is "camouflaged" inside the answer to the primary puzzle and involves a new clue. The contestant has ten seconds to solve the puzzle without the benefit of removing letters from the puzzle. To counter this disadvantage, contestants may guess as much as they wish without penalty, and the secondary clues are generally more straightforward than in the main game. If a contestant solves the secondary puzzle, the contestant is credited with double the value of the primary puzzle; if incorrect, the contestant still retains the value of the primary puzzle.

=== Final Camouflage ===
The endgame revolves around solving a "Final Camouflage" puzzle. The contestant gets a certain amount of help based on his or her performance in a speed round. The contestant is given 45 seconds to solve as many puzzles as he or she can. Decoy letters automatically drop from the puzzles one at a time. As in a "Double Camouflage" puzzle, a contestant may make as many guesses as he or she wishes at each speed round puzzle. When time expires, the "Final Camouflage" puzzle is revealed to the contestant. For each puzzle solved in the speed round, a decoy letter is dropped from the final puzzle. The contestant then has 15 seconds to solve the final puzzle, giving as many guesses as he or she wishes. A contestant who correctly solves the final puzzle wins $5,000; a contestant who fails to solve the puzzle is given $250 for each puzzle he or she solved during the speed round.

== Interactive play ==
GSN.com had a smaller, modified version of the game that can be played on an Internet-connected computer, however it was removed in mid-2013 for unknown reasons.
