= Tony Potts =

American television personality (born 1963)

- Born: Anthony Ray Potts; January 23, 1963 (age 63)
- Spouse: Shalini Vadhera (m. 2010)
- Children: 2

Tony Potts (born January 23, 1963) is an American Emmy-winning television personality, producer, writer and media executive. A news, sports, and entertainment anchor in the 1980s and 1990s, Potts was a reporter for the entertainment newsmagazine Access Hollywood from 1999 to 2011 before launching several ventures of his own.

== Biography ==
Potts graduated from Cal Poly Humboldt with a BA in journalism/editorial writing and a minor in radio/television. He worked at WNHT in Concord, New Hampshire (1988–1989), KSTW in Tacoma, Washington (1989–1993), and WPRI-TV in Providence, Rhode Island (1993–1994) before joining WNYW in New York City to anchor Good Day New York and the station's noon news.

After leaving WNYW, Potts signed a deal with ABC/Buena Vista Television. He contributed to Good Morning America. He was later a correspondent for Entertainment Tonight and, after a family emergency prevented him from leaving California to join KPRC-TV in Houston, he began a 12-season run on Access Hollywood, while continuing to write and produce and create.

In addition, Potts co-founded the early-stage venture capital firm Sierra Maya 360, worked for Modern Times Group in Amsterdam, and founded Organized Kaos Media in Los Angeles.

During Potts's time in New York, he appeared in the Mel Gibson blockbuster film Ransom, directed by Ron Howard. In Los Angeles, he appeared in the season two finale of CSI: Miami, playing a helicopter pilot leading a prison breakout. He played himself on several episodes of the FX series Dirt, which starred Courteney Cox.

Sports

On February 16, 2007, Potts won the NBA All-Star Celebrity Game Most Valuable Player award, as Potts scored 14 points and had 8 rebounds as the West defeated the East 40–21.

== Personal life ==
On July 24, 2010, he married beauty entrepreneur Shalini Vadhera. Potts has two daughters.
