= Kevin Daley (basketball) =

Panamanian basketball player (born 1976)

Medal record

Men’s Basketball

Representing Panama

Centrobasket
Bronze medal – third place	2004 Dominican Republic	Team

Kevin Alex Daley Hewitt (born October 7, 1976) is a Panamanian former basketball player for the Harlem Globetrotters. He also played on the Panama national team.

== Early life ==
Daley was born in Panama City. He grew up in Los Angeles County, and graduated from Artesia High in Lakewood, California.

== College career ==
Daley played as a freshman for Nevada. However, he grew homesick and transferred to the University of California, Los Angeles (UCLA). After sitting out a year, he played as a sophomore for the Bruins in 1997–98. Unhappy with the limited playing time he received, he transferred again to Azusa Pacific University. Daley led the Cougars to the NAIA Final Four, and earned the Conference Most Valuable Player honors in 2000.

== Professional career ==
He played overseas in Australia, Taiwan, the Netherlands and for the Panama national team before joining the Harlem Globetrotters after they saw him play in a 2004 summer league. Kevin played with the Globetrotters for 10 years and performed shows in both Spanish and English. During the team's 2005 World Tour, Daley played as a dunker and Showman.

== After basketball ==
In 2007, Daley became an American citizen. He also received a Sociology degree from Ashford University in 2010. Since retiring from basketball Daley has written an autobiography called “I Never Stopped Smiling”, and delivered speeches based on it, as well as working as a Sales Director for Velocity Global.

In 2023, Kevin Daley made his acting debut in the feature film Sweetwater. He also coordinated the basketball scenes in the film.

== Michael Jordan's double ==
Daley was a body double portraying a young Michael Jordan in the Gatorade 2002 commercial "23 vs 39", in which a Bulls-era Jordan takes on his Wizards-era counterpart in a game of 1-on-1. The spot makers interposed a CGI reproduction of a young Jordan onto Daley's body and face in post-production.
