= Micah Parsons =

American football player (born 1999)

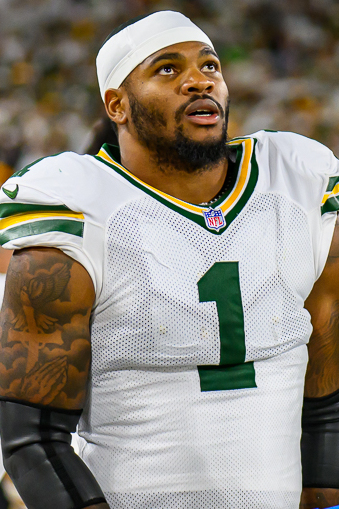
- Parsons with the Green Bay Packers in 2025

No. 1 – Green Bay Packers
- Position: Outside linebacker
- Roster status: Physically unable to perform

Personal information
- Born: May 26, 1999 (age 27); Harrisburg, Pennsylvania, U.S.
- Listed height: 6 ft 3 in (1.91 m)
- Listed weight: 250 lb (113 kg)

Career information
- High school: Harrisburg
- College: Penn State (2018–2020)
- NFL draft: 2021: 1st round, 12th overall pick

Career history
- Dallas Cowboys (2021–2024); Green Bay Packers (2025–present)

Awards and highlights
- NFL Defensive Rookie of the Year (2021); 3× First-team All-Pro (2021, 2022, 2025); Second-team All-Pro (2023); 5× Pro Bowl (2021–2025); Butkus Award (pro) (2021); PFWA All-Rookie Team (2021); Consensus All-American (2019); Big Ten Linebacker of the Year (2019); Freshman All-American (2018)

Career NFL statistics as of 2025
- Tackles: 297
- Sacks: 65
- Forced fumbles: 11
- Fumble recoveries: 4
- Pass deflections: 10
- Defensive touchdowns: 1
- Stats at Pro Football Reference

Micah Aaron Parsons (born May 26, 1999) is an American professional football outside linebacker for the Green Bay Packers of the National Football League (NFL). Parsons played college football for the Penn State Nittany Lions, where he earned consensus All-American honors and was named the 2019 Big Ten Linebacker of the Year.

Selected by the Dallas Cowboys in the first round of the 2021 NFL draft, Parsons was named Defensive Rookie of the Year and earned four Pro Bowl and three All-Pro selections in four seasons with the team. He was traded to the Packers in 2025 amid a contract holdout and signed a four-year, $188 million extension, making him the highest-paid non-quarterback in NFL history at the time.

== Early life ==
Parsons was born in Harrisburg, Pennsylvania, on May 26, 1999. He attended Central Dauphin High School for his freshman and sophomore years, before transferring to Harrisburg High School where he started at both defensive end and running back.

As a senior, Parsons posted 1,239 rushing yards, 27 rushing touchdowns (tied for ninth in the state), 99 receiving yards, and 2 receiving touchdowns. Parsons also played varsity basketball.

He was a five-star recruit and was ranked #4 in his class by 247Sports.com and #7 by ESPN. Parsons was recruited by Nebraska, Georgia, Oklahoma, Ohio State, Alabama, and Penn State. On December 19, it was reported that Ohio State had committed NCAA violations because the university allowed him on the set of ESPN's College GameDay to take a picture with analyst Kirk Herbstreit. As Herbstreit is a former Ohio State University quarterback, this was a violation of NCAA rules, as recruits are not allowed to have contact with members of the media associated with potential college teams. As a result, Ohio State agreed to no longer recruit Parsons.

Penn State University offered Parsons a football scholarship after just four games of his freshman season. He initially committed in the spring of 2016, then decommitted, before recommitting again on December 20, 2017. He graduated Harrisburg High School seven months early to expedite the enrollment process.

College recruiting
Name	Hometown	School	Height	Weight	40^{‡}	Commit date
Micah Parsons; DE, LB	Harrisburg, PA	Harrisburg HS	6 ft 3 in (1.91 m)	235 lb (107 kg)	4.66	Dec 20, 2017
Micah Parsons; DE, LB	Recruit ratings: Rivals: 247Sports: (91)					
Overall recruit ranking:
‡ Refers to 40-yard dash; Note: In many cases, Scout, Rivals, 247Sports, On3, and ESPN may conflict in their listings of height, weight and 40 time.; In these cases, the average was taken. ESPN grades are on a 100-point scale.; Sources: "2018 Team Ranking". Rivals.com.

== College career ==
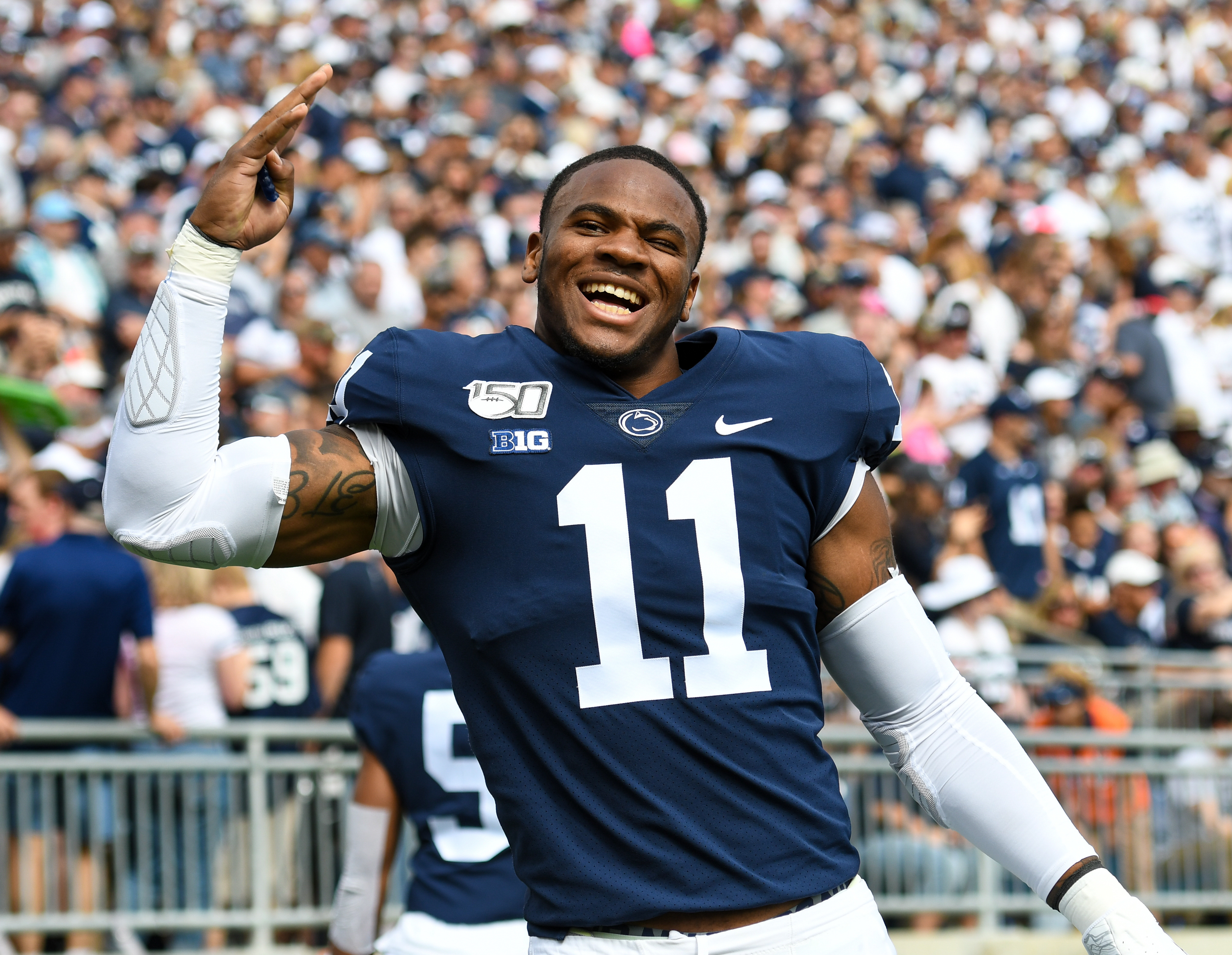
Parsons with the Penn State Nittany Lions in 2019

After committing to Penn State, Parsons was informed by head coach James Franklin that he would start his Penn State career at middle linebacker rather than defensive end, which he played in high school. Parsons was in contention for the starting job even though he was a true freshman. In his freshman year, Parsons only started one out of 13 games for the Nittany Lions, but managed to lead the team in tackles with 82, while also making 4 tackles for loss, 1.5 sacks, 10 quarterback hurries and 2 forced fumbles. He became the first Nittany Lion to ever lead the team in tackles as a freshman. He started at outside linebacker against Rutgers University, after junior linebacker Cam Brown was disciplined because of a rules violation incident, with Parsons making 7 tackles (2 for loss) and a strip-sack. He had 14 tackles (one for loss) and a strip-sack against the University of Kentucky in the 2019 Citrus Bowl. He finished second in the Big Ten Freshman of the Year voting behind wide receiver Rondale Moore.

Prior to the start of his sophomore season, Parsons was named to the Butkus Award preseason watch list. He started 12 out of 13 games at middle linebacker, totaling 109 tackles (14 for loss), five sacks, 26 quarterback hurries, five deflected passes, and four forced fumbles. Parsons went on to be named the Butkus–Fitzgerald Linebacker of the Year (given to the Big Ten Linebacker of the Year) and a consensus All-American. Parsons was named the 2019 Cotton Bowl Classic defensive MVP after recording 14 tackles, two sacks, and two forced fumbles.

He opted out of the 2020 season due to concerns regarding the COVID-19 pandemic and declined his remaining years of college eligibility in favor of making himself available to the NFL in the 2021 draft. Despite leaving Penn State early to enter the NFL, Parsons completed his degree in criminology and graduated from Penn State in 2021.

== Professional career ==
Pre-draft measurables
Height	Weight	Arm length	Hand span	Wingspan	40-yard dash	10-yard split	20-yard split	20-yard shuttle	Three-cone drill	Vertical jump	Broad jump	Bench press
6 ft 3 1/8 in (1.91 m)	246 lb (112 kg)	31 1/2 in (0.80 m)	11 in (0.28 m)	6 ft 6 7/8 in (2.00 m)	4.39 s	1.59 s	2.58 s	4.40 s	6.96 s	34.0 in (0.86 m)	10 ft 6 in (3.20 m)	19 reps
All values from Pro Day

=== Dallas Cowboys ===
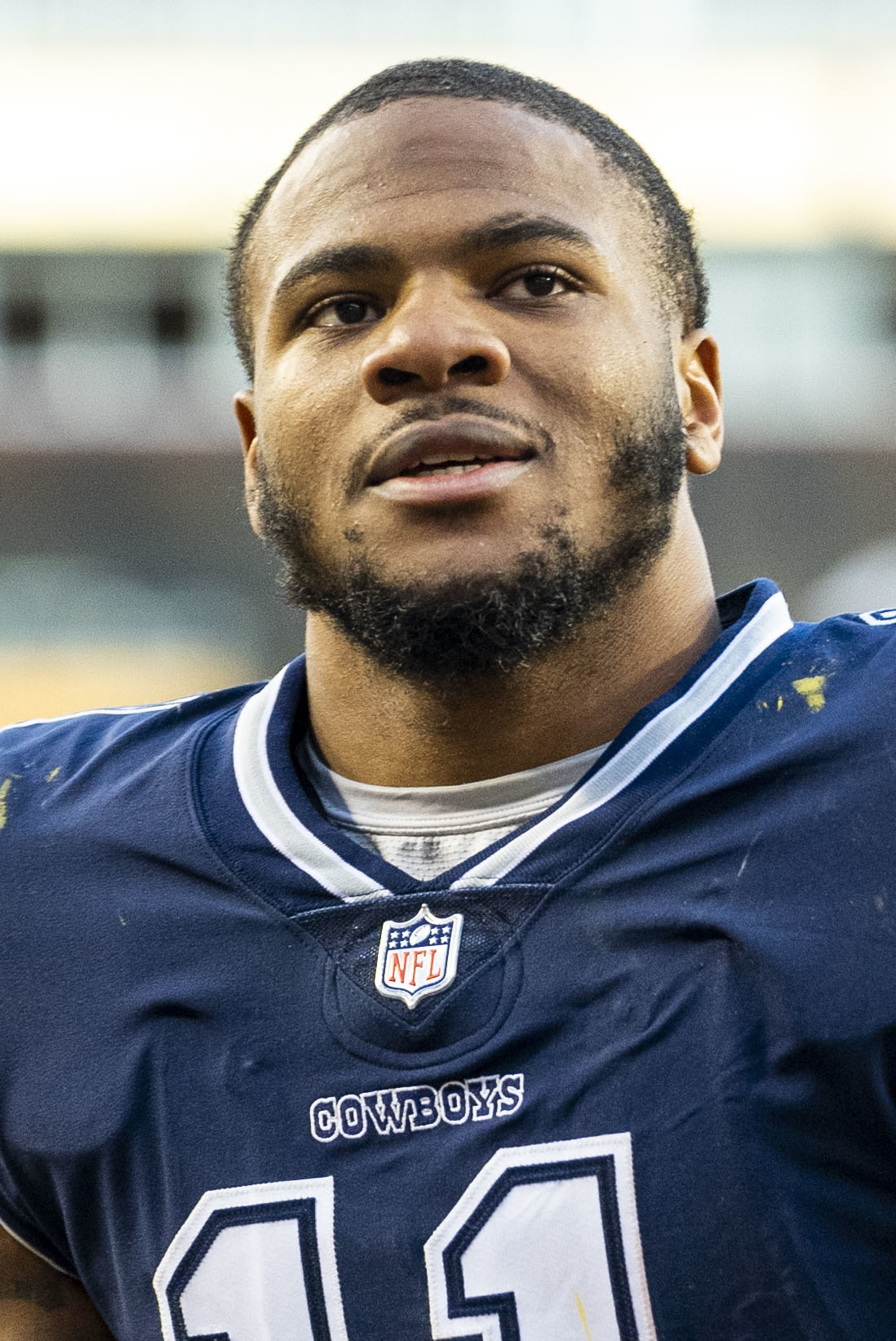
Parsons with the Dallas Cowboys in 2021

Parsons was selected in the first round (12th overall) by the Dallas Cowboys in the 2021 NFL draft. He signed his four-year rookie contract, worth $17 million, on June 9, 2021. When DeMarcus Lawrence broke his foot in practice before Week 2, Dallas converted Parsons back to his high school position of defensive end where he saw immediate success, particularly as a pass rusher. In Week 8, Parsons had 11 tackles, including four for loss in a 20–16 win over the Minnesota Vikings, earning NFC Defensive Player of the Week. From Week 9 to Week 14, Parsons recorded at least one sack in six straight games. His 12 sacks in his first 13 career games are the fourth-most by a rookie in NFL history behind only Julius Peppers (13), Reggie White (13) and Leslie O'Neal (12.5). Parsons finished with 84 total tackles, 13 sacks and three forced fumbles. His 13 sacks were a Cowboys rookie record for a season. He was voted into the Pro Bowl, named first-team All-Pro by the Associated Press, and was the unanimous Defensive Rookie of the Year. He was named to the PFWA All-Rookie Team. He was ranked 16th by his fellow players on the NFL Top 100 Players of 2022.

In Week 5 of the 2022 season, Parsons had two sacks, five tackles, and a tackle for loss in a 22–10 win over the defending champions Los Angeles Rams, earning NFC Defensive Player of the Week. In Week 8, against the Chicago Bears, he had a 36-yard fumble return for a touchdown in the 49–29 victory. In the 2022 season, Parsons had 13.5 sacks, 65 total tackles (42 solo), three passes defended, and three forced fumbles. He had six games on the season with two sacks. Parsons was named a first-team All-Pro by the Associated Press at the end of the year. He was ranked ninth by his fellow players on the NFL Top 100 Players of 2023.

In Week 2 of the 2023 season, Parsons recorded four tackles, three for a loss, two sacks, a pass breakup, a forced fumble and recovery in a 30–10 win over the New York Jets, earning NFC Defensive Player of the Week. He finished the 2023 season with 14 sacks, 64 total tackles (36 solo), two passes defended, one forced fumble, and one fumble recovery. He earned Pro Bowl honors for the 2023 season. He was ranked 17th by his fellow players on the NFL Top 100 Players of 2024.

On April 24, 2024, the Cowboys picked up the fifth-year option on Parsons' contract. In the 2024 season, Parsons had 12 sacks, 43 tackles, one pass defended, and two forced fumbles. He is one of two players in NFL history to record at least 12 sacks in each of their first four seasons, joining Reggie White. He was ranked 36th by his fellow players on the NFL Top 100 Players of 2025.

In 2025, his attempts to sign a new contract with the Cowboys became contentious and the relationship deteriorated while owner Jerry Jones negotiated directly with Parsons. Reports in the media indicated that Jones believed he had struck a handshake agreement, only for Parsons' agent (David Mulugheta) — who did not participate in the discussions — to reject the deal. Parsons reported to training camp without participating in practices, citing a back issue. On August 1, 2025, Parsons requested the Cowboys trade him and released a statement explaining his reasoning through his personal Twitter account, "Yes I wanted to be here. I did everything I could to show that I wanted to be a Cowboy and wear the star on my helmet. I wanted to play in front of the best fans in sports and make this America's team once again. The team my pops and I grew up cheering for way up in Harrisburg, PA. Unfortunately I no longer want to be here. I no longer want to be held to close door negotiations without my agent present. I no longer want shots taken at me for getting injured while laying it on the line for the organization, our fans and my teammates. I no longer want narratives created and spread to the media about me." Jones responded by telling Cowboys fans "don't lose any sleep," implying there was no interest in trading Parsons, and started to regularly discuss the circumstances in the media. On August 22, 2025, the situation came to an inflection point, when Parsons was caught on television napping on a trainer's table on the sideline, during the third quarter of the preseason game against the Atlanta Falcons. On August 28, 2025, the Cowboys decided to go ahead with the trade request, which was widely criticized by analysts and fans, questioning trading a "generational talent" to a major NFC opponent and receiving what was seen as a low return. Besides acquiring Kenny Clark, the Cowboys eventually turned the picks they received from the Green Bay Packers into: Quinnen Williams (plus additional compensation), Malachi Lawrence, Devin Moore and LT Overton.

=== Green Bay Packers ===
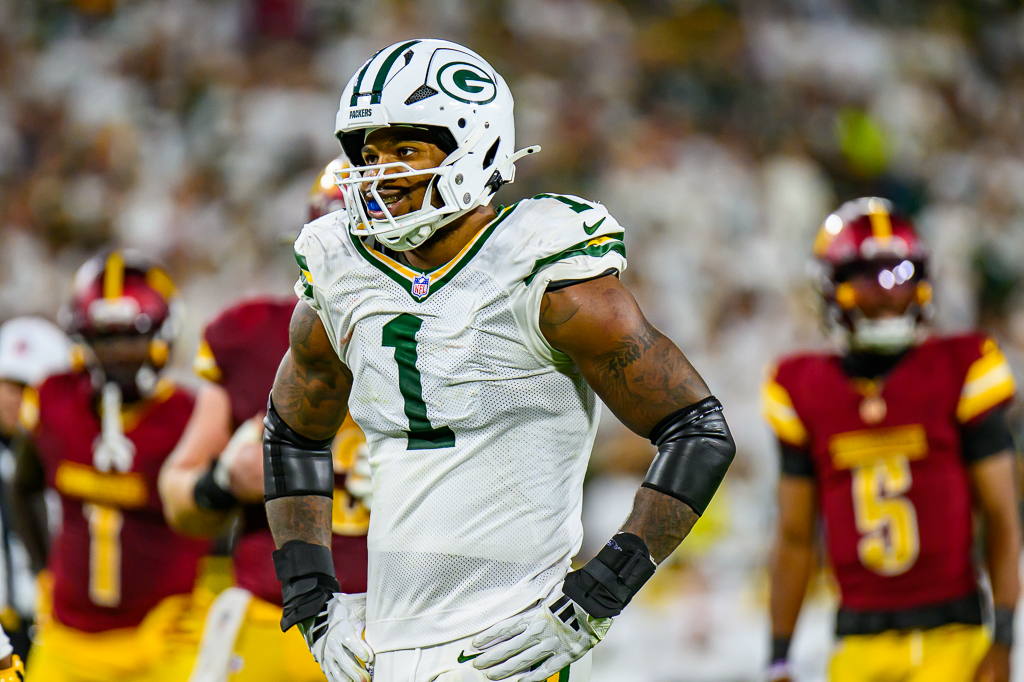
Parsons with the Packers in a game against the Washington Commanders, 2025

After his holdout continued into the preseason, on August 28, 2025, the Cowboys traded Parsons to the Green Bay Packers in exchange for defensive tackle Kenny Clark and two first-round draft picks. Immediately after being traded, Parsons agreed to a four-year, $188 million contract, making him the highest-paid non-quarterback in NFL history. Parsons chose to wear No. 1 with the Packers, a number not worn by a Packer in the regular season since team founder Curly Lambeau wore it in the 1925 and 1926 seasons.

On October 19, in a 27–23 win over the Arizona Cardinals, Parsons tallied a career high three sacks on quarterback Jacoby Brissett, for which he won NFC Defensive Player of the Week honors. On December 14, during Week 15 against the Denver Broncos, Parsons suffered a non-contact knee injury while pass rushing Bo Nix. He did not return for the remainder of the game, as the Packers lost 34–26. Later the same day, it was reported that the initial fear was that he suffered a torn ACL. Parsons was placed on season-ending injured reserve on December 17. Despite this, he was still selected for the 2026 Pro Bowl Games. He earned first team All-Pro honors for the third time. He finished the 2025 season with 12.5 sacks, 41 tackles, and one pass defended.

Parsons began the 2026 season on the PUP list while recovering from the torn ACL, sidelining him for the first six weeks of the regular season.

== Career statistics ==
Legend
**Bold**	Career high

=== NFL ===
==== Regular season ====
Year	Team	Games		Tackles					Fumbles				Interceptions			
Year	Team	GP	GS	Cmb	Solo	Ast	Sck	TFL	FF	FR	Yds	TD	Int	Yds	TD	PD
2021	DAL	16	16	**84**	**64**	20	13.0	**20**	**3**	0	0	0	0	0	0	**3**
2022	DAL	17	17	65	42	23	13.5	13	**3**	**3**	**36**	**1**	0	0	0	**3**
2023	DAL	17	17	64	36	**28**	**14.0**	18	1	1	0	0	0	0	0	2
2024	DAL	13	13	43	30	13	12.0	12	2	0	0	0	0	0	0	1
2025	GB	14	13	41	19	22	12.5	12	2	0	0	0	0	0	0	1
Career		77	76	297	191	106	65.0	75	11	4	36	1	0	0	0	10

==== Postseason ====
Year	Team	Games		Tackles					Fumbles				Interceptions			
Year	Team	GP	GS	Cmb	Solo	Ast	Sck	TFL	FF	FR	Yds	TD	Int	Yds	TD	PD
2021	DAL	1	1	**9**	3	**6**	0.0	1	0	0	0	0	0	0	0	0
2022	DAL	2	2	7	**4**	3	**1.0**	**2**	0	0	0	0	0	0	0	**3**
2023	DAL	1	1	2	1	1	0.0	0	0	0	0	0	0	0	0	0
Career		4	4	18	8	10	1.0	3	0	0	0	0	0	0	0	3

=== College ===
Year	Team	Games		Tackles					Fumbles				Interceptions			
Year	Team	GP	GS	Cmb	Solo	Ast	Sck	TFL	FF	FR	Yds	TD	Int	Yds	TD	PD
2018	Penn State	13	1	83	48	35	1.5	5.0	2	0	0	0	0	0	0	0
2019	Penn State	13	12	**109**	**52**	**57**	**5.0**	**14.0**	**4**	**1**	0	0	0	0	0	**5**
2020	Penn State	Opted out due to the COVID-19 pandemic														
Career		26	13	192	100	92	6.5	19.0	6	1	0	0	0	0	0	5

== Personal life ==
In May 2018, Parsons became the father of a son, Malcolm. Parsons cited the risk that COVID-19 presented to the health and well-being of his son Malcolm as a major factor in his decision to opt out participation in the 2020 college football season. Parsons welcomed a daughter on January 14, 2023. Parsons is a native of Harrisburg, Pennsylvania. He is a fan of Penn State wrestling, the Philadelphia Phillies and Philadelphia 76ers.

Parsons is a Christian. After his ACL injury, he said, “I may be sidelined, but I am not defeated. This injury is my greatest test — a moment God allowed to strengthen my testimony. I believe He walks with me through this storm and chose me for this fight because He knew my heart could carry it. I’m deeply grateful to the Packers organization and my teammates for their unwavering support, love, and belief in me during this season. I trust His timing, His plan, and His purpose. I will rise again.”

In October 2020, Parsons' teammate Isaiah Humphries filed a lawsuit against Penn State University, alleging that he had been hazed by teammates. Although not mentioned in the suit, Humphries claimed that Parsons was among the players he had been victimized and harassed by. In April 2021, Parsons stated in an interview "They were false allegations. There's nothing pending against me, there's nothing I would lie about."

On December 8, 2022, the United States announced a prisoner swap with Russia, which led to the release of WNBA basketball player, Brittney Griner from a Russian prison. In response, Parsons expressed disappointment that the US did not secure the release of Paul Whelan, a former U.S. Marine held in Russia, as part of the prisoner swap. On Twitter, Parsons wrote "Wait nah!! We left a marine?? Hell Nah." Whelan would later be released in August 2024 in the 2024 Ankara prisoner exchange.

On February 16, 2024, Parsons played in the NBA All-Star Weekend Celebrity Game. Parsons shot 17 of 31 and finished with 37 points, 16 rebounds and four steals in the 100–91 victory. This performance earned him the Most Valuable Player award for the game. On May 14, 2024, Parsons signed a multi-year extension deal with Warner Bros. Discovery, making him president of their American football digital sports media division, B/R Gridiron. Parsons is a self-taught chess player, who uses the game to cultivate his game on the football field.
