= Roger Lodge =

American media personality

- Born: Roger Chavez; March 12, 1960 (age 66); Fontana, California, United States
- Occupations: Actor, game show and sports radio host, radio personality, writer, producer
- Years active: 1986–present
- Spouse: Pamela Paulshock (?–present)
- Children: 3

Roger Lodge (born August 19, 1960) is an American TV game show and sports radio host and actor. He is known for hosting the syndicated dating show Blind Date. Lodge's acting credits include appearances on the ABC sitcom Full House; CBS's Yes, Dear; and UPN's The Parkers. He also appeared in the Tony Scott film The Fan and Not of This Earth. He hosts The SportsLodge on radio station KLAA AM 830, which is owned by the Los Angeles Angels baseball team and serves as their radio flagship station. He also hosts the Angels pregame show on AM 830 and the Angels Baseball Radio Network.

== Life and career ==
Lodge was born as Roger Chavez in Fontana, California, and raised in Lakewood, California. After his father left, Lodge's mother Helga married Robert Lodge and started using the last name Lodge. Lodge is the brother of retired homicide detective and California politician Steven Albert Chavez Lodge. Growing up, Lodge was a star basketball guard at Cerritos High School, where he was teammates with Ben Howland, and also played basketball at Whittier College. He played various minor roles in the entertainment industry for several years, most notably regular guest host for the program Talk Soup, on E! Entertainment Television. He also hosted his own half-hour weekly show for the Sci-Fi Channel, entitled S.F. Vortex, revolving around science-fiction news with roundtable discussions. Lodge's acting credits include appearances on the ABC sitcom Full House, CBS's Yes, Dear, and UPN's The Parkers. He also appeared in the Tony Scott film The Fan and in Not of This Earth.

From 1998 to 2006, Lodge was the host of the syndicated dating show Blind Date, his best known role. In July 2007, he began hosting a new game show called Camouflage on GSN.

He has been the host of The Price Is Right Live! stage productions in Las Vegas, Nevada and Atlantic City, New Jersey. He also served as fill-in host for Jim Rome, on ESPN'S Jim Rome Is Burning in December 2007. He can be heard hosting The Sports Lodge every afternoon on AM 830 KLAA. Lodge also appeared on That's So Raven. He also did a sport segment for the KTLA Morning News, until June 2012, when KTLA chose to end its relationship with AM 830.

From 2003 to 2005, Lodge hosted a local sports talk radio show on KMPC 1540 AM, "The Ticket", based in Santa Monica, California. Lodge is also a frequent guest on the ESPN show, Jim Rome Is Burning. Lodge also occasionally guest-hosts The Jim Rome Show on radio. In 2004, he hosted the ESPN game show ESPN Trivial Pursuit. In late 2005, Lodge joined station KLAC (AM 570 Sports) as a fill-in host. He also serves as the play-by-play announcer for the Gender Bowl.

Lodge won the Celebrity 3-Point Shootout during NBA All-Star Weekend, both in 2004 and 2005.

He hosts The SportsLodge on radio station KLAA AM 830, which is owned by the Los Angeles Angels baseball team and serves as their radio flagship station. He also hosts the Angels pregame show on AM 830 and the Angels Baseball Radio Network. Lodge also hosted and Executive Produced the television show Celebridate which aired for two seasons on Mark Cuban's HDnet TV.

He has made several appearances on truTV's The Smoking Gun Presents: World's Dumbest... as a commentator. He is also the host of Talk the Talk, on Reelz Channel. Lodge often filled in for Jim Rome on both since-cancelled CBS Sports Network shows Rome and Leadoff. In 2021, he appeared in a commercial for Noble Gold.

== Selected filmography ==
=== Film ===
Year	Title	Role	Notes
1988	Not of This Earth	Harry	
1994	Tammy and the T-Rex	Dr. Rosenthal	
1996	The Fan	Reporter	
2010	Why Did I Get Married Too?	Sportscaster #2	

=== Television ===
Year	Title	Role	Notes
1989-1994	Full House	Roger	3 episodes
1999-2005	Blind Date	Himself; host	
2000	Yes, Dear	John	Episode: "The Good Couple"
2000	Sabrina the Teenage Witch	Roger Lodge	Episode: "Heart of the Matter"
2001	Providence	Himself	Episode: "The Mating Dance"
2001	The Parkers	Himself	Episode: "Blind Date Mistake"
2002	Spin City	Roger Lodge	Episode: "Sex, Lies and Video Date"
2004	That's So Raven	Rodney Rivers (Termidate host)	Episode: "The Dating Shame"
2005-2010	Jim Rome Is Burning	Himself; host	117 episodes
2006	Girlfriends	Roger Lodge	Episode: "The It Girl"
2007	Camouflage	Himself; host	
2008-2010	World's Dumbest...	Himself; host	59 episodes
