= Tristan Jass =

American basketball player and social media influencer (born 1999)

Personal information
- Born: December 9, 1999 (age 26)
- Listed height: 5 ft 10 in (1.78 m)

Career information
- High school: Tremper (Kenosha, Wisconsin)
- Playing career: 2025–present
- Position: Guard

Tristan Jass (born December 9, 1999) is an American basketball player and social media influencer. He gained prominence through his viral basketball trick-shot videos and engaging content on platforms like YouTube and Instagram. In April 2025, he signed with the Vancouver Bandits of the Canadian Elite Basketball League (CEBL).

== Early life ==
A native of Kenosha, Wisconsin, Jass attended George Nelson Tremper High School. He played basketball for the Tremper Trojans, where he was on the state leaderboard for assists one season. He also played AAU basketball. In 2017, a video of Jass performing a crossover dribble against his teacher went viral nationally.

Jass was offered a full-ride NAIA scholarship to play basketball at Ottawa University (OUAZ) in Surprise, Arizona, but he chose to forgo college to pursue a career in social media, as college rules at the time prohibited him from continuing to create content.

== Social media career ==
Tristan Jass
- Occupation: YouTuber

YouTube information
- Channel: TristanJass
- Years active: 2014–present
- Subscribers: 5.6 million
- Views: 1 billion

Jass started a YouTube channel as a teenager. His trick shots led to appearances in the 2024 NBA all-star weekend celebrity game and NBA Creator Cup. As of January 2026, he had 5.6 million YouTube subscribers, 3.1 million TikTok followers, and 2.4 million Instagram followers.

== Basketball career ==
After a made-for-content tryout with the Scarborough Shooting Stars of the Canadian Elite Basketball League (CEBL) in 2024, Jass' representatives reached out to the league to gauge interest in having him compete on a higher, more serious level.

On April 17, 2025, Jass signed his first professional contract with the Vancouver Bandits of the CEBL. He was included in the Bandits' training camp roster on May 7 and appeared in two preseason games for the Bandits on May 8 and May 10. He was ruled out of the team's season opener on May 15 with a lower body injury. He remained out with the lower body injury as of June 28. On July 1, he was placed on the Bandits' suspended list as a result of the CEBL's import player limitations, restricting clubs to a maximum of four non-Canadian players on an active roster at a time. He remained deactivated as of July 25.

== Personal life ==
In December 2025, Jass announced that he would be undergoing surgery for a brain tumor, revealing that he had previously experienced seizures and that doctors had discovered a small cyst in his brain in 2019. He had recovered from surgery by January 2026.
