= Blind Date (American TV series) =

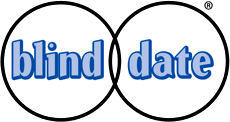
- Genre: Dating game show
- Created by: John Degnan
- Presented by: Roger Lodge; Nikki Glaser
- Theme music composer: Devin Powers
- Country of origin: United States
- Original language: English
- No. of seasons: 8
- No. of episodes: 1450+

Production
- Executive producers: David Garfinkle; Jay Renfroe; Matt Papish; Thomas Klein
- Running time: 23 minutes
- Production companies: Gold Coast Television Entertainment; NBCUniversal Television Distribution

Original release
- Network: Syndication (1999–2006); Bravo (2019–2020)
- Release: September 20, 1999 – May 6, 2020

Blind Date is an American dating game show. The show was originally hosted by Roger Lodge from 1999 until 2006, and was later hosted in narration by Nikki Glaser from 2019 until 2020.

During its syndicated years (1999–2006), the series was distributed by Universal Worldwide Television. It was later distributed by NBCUniversal Television Distribution. The program was one of the many syndicated dating programs from the late 1990s-early 2000s (other shows in this category included Change of Heart, The 5th Wheel, ElimiDate, Ex-treme Dating and Shipmates), that aired after midnight, aimed at college age students coming home from partying or studying.

== Synopsis ==
During each episode, people who did not previously know each other at all were paired up and sent off on a blind date. The cameras followed their every move, while commentary in the form of subtitles, animations, and "thought bubbles" was added by the show's producers. The most common "type" of date on the show involved two attractive people in their 20's and 30's, one male and one female, who would do 1 or 2 activities before having dinner and (often) hanging out in a Jacuzzi, after which the date would end. However, the show did a lot of variations on this theme: many episodes took place in other cities or even other countries, a lot of dates involved same-sex couples or older daters, and there would be dates that were explicitly stated to be "hot dates" or "dates from hell", which reflected the daters becoming physically intimate on the former score and furiously hating each other on the latter one. The show did not make alcohol available to daters who were driving themselves around, while chauffeured contestants were usually free to (and often did) drink a lot of liquor.

From its initial 1999–2006 run, the show ended up having two couples that met on blind dates and later got married; while other couples did date for a while as documented in later "Checking In" segments, the majority of dates ended with the daters stating that there was no connection and there wouldn't be any further dates. While some daters stated that they'd like to see each other again, few such meetings were ever confirmed.

== Reboot ==
On October 10, 2019, it was announced that the series was getting revived and premiered on November 18, 2019, on Bravo until it ended on May 7, 2020 after one season. This was hosted in narration by comedian Nikki Glaser. Although, this version is just like the original, it includes a modern day twist in order to match social media trends.

== Syndication ==
Blind Date was aired on TNN (The National Network, later Spike TV, now The Paramount Network) from 2001 to 2003. Also, Spike TV picked up the show after re-launching the new channel name, the show re-aired from 2003 to 2005. Blind Date re-aired on Fox Reality Channel from 2005 to 2010.

Some Blind Date episodes are available on Nosey.com but only a fraction of the over 1450 episodes that were produced.

== See also ==
- Blind Date (British game show)
- Hell Date
- Disaster Date
