= Ade (given name) =

- Gender: Male
- Language: Yoruba

Origin
- Origin: Yorubaland
- Meaning: Royalty/Crown
- Region of origin: Yorubaland [Nigeria, Benin, Togo]

Adé (/əˈdi/ or /ɑːˈdeɪ/, Yoruba: [ādé]) is a popular Yoruba given name or nickname, which means "crown" or "royalty" . Often times, the name ‘Ade’ is associated with someone from a royal family or someone from a royal lineage. It is often short for names such as Adébọlá which means ‘crown meets wealth’, Adéọlá which denotes ‘crown of wealth’ or Adéwálé which means ‘the crown’s return’. It is also short for Adrian.

== Notable people bearing the name ==
- José dos Santos Ferreira or Adé (1919–1993), Macanese writer
- Emmanuel Adebayor or Ade (born 1984), Togolese footballer
- Ade (actor) (born 1970s), English actor
- Ade Adebisi (born 1986), British-Nigerian rugby league footballer
- Ade Adepitan (born 1973), British television presenter and wheelchair basketball player
- Ade Akinbiyi (born 1974), English footballer
- Ade Alleyne-Forte (born 1988), Trinidadian sprinter
- Ade Aruna (born 1994), American football player
- Ade Azeez (born 1994), English footballer
- Ade Bethune (1914–2002), American Catholic liturgical artist
- Ade Candra Rachmawan (born 1992), Indonesian beach volleyballer
- Ade Capone (1958–2015), Italian comic book writer
- Ade Chandra (born 1950)
- Ade Coker (born 1954), Nigerian-American footballer
- Ade Dagunduro (born 1986), Nigerian-American basketballer
- Ade Easily, musician
- Ade Edmondson (born 1957), English comedian, actor, musician, and television presenter
- Ade Fuqua (born 1970), American civil servant
- Ade Gardner (born 1983), English rugby league footballer
- Ade Hamnett (1882–1956), English footballer
- Ade Hassan (born 1984)
- Ade Ipaye (born 1968), Nigerian lawyer and political appointee
- Ade Jimoh (born 1980), American football player
- Ade Jantra Lukmana (born 1990), Indonesian footballer
- Ade Mafe (born 1966), English sprinter
- Ade Mochtar (born 1979), Indonesian footballer
- Ade Monsbourgh (1917–2006), Australian jazz musician known as "Lazy Ade" or "Father Ade"
- Ade A. Olufeko (born 1980), designer, technologist, and entrepreneur
- Ade Ojeikere, Nigerian sports analyst and columnist
- Ade Orogbemi (born 1978), British wheelchair basketball player
- Ade Rai (born 1970), Indonesian bodybuilder
- Ade Schwammel (1908–1979), American footballer
- Ade Shaw (born 1947), musician
- Ade Iwan Setiawan (born 1984), Indonesian footballer
- Ade Solanke, playwright
- Ade Suhendra (footballer, born 1983), Indonesian footballer
- Ade Suhendra (footballer, born 1987), Indonesian footballer
- Ade Supandi (born 1961), admiral in the Indonesian Navy
- Ade Sutrisna (1974–2016), Indonesian badminton player
- Ade Renner Thomas (born 1945)
- Ade Tuyo, Nigerian businessman
- Ade Yusuf Santoso (born 1993), Indonesian badminton player
