= Fouquet =

Fouquet or Foucquet is a French surname. Many immigrants to the United States anglicized this surname to either Fuqua or Fuquay upon arrival.

Fouquet or Foucquet may refer to:

== People ==
Listed alphabetically by given name

=== Arts and music ===
- Georges Fouquet (1862–1957), French jewelry designer
- Jacques Foucquet (fl. 1685–1704), French artist primarily active in Sweden
- Jean Fouquet (1420–1481), French painter
- Nick Fouquet (born 1983), French-American fashion designer
- Pierre-Claude Foucquet (1694–1772), French organist and harpsichordist

=== Government / nobility ===
- Charles Louis Auguste Fouquet, Duke of Belle-Isle (1684–1761), French general and statesman
- Guillaume Fouquet de la Varenne (1560–1616), French chef and statesman
- Louis Charles Armand Fouquet, Chevalier de Belle-Isle (1693–1747), French general
- Louis Marie Fouquet, Count of Gisors (1732–1758), French nobleman and soldier
- Nicolas Fouquet (1615–1680), French superintendent of finances under Louis XIV of France

=== Religion ===
- Bernardin-François Fouquet (1705–1785), French Catholic prelate, cardinal, abbot and archbishop
- Jean-François Foucquet (1665–1741), French Jesuit, bishop and scientist

=== Sports ===
- Christophe Fouquet (born 1974), French bobsledder
- Nathanael Fouquet (born 1972), French slalom canoeist
- Virginie Fouquet (born 1975), French middle-distance runner

=== Other ===
- Henri Fouquet (1727–1806), French physician
- Julie Fouquet (born 1958), American applied physicist, engineer, laser scientist, and inventor
- Marie Fouquet (1590–1681), French medical writer and philanthropist

== Other uses ==
- Fouquet's, a historic brasserie restaurant in Paris, founded in 1899
  - Hôtel Barrière Le Fouquet's, location of the brasserie
- La Motte-Fouquet, a commune in the Orne department in north-western France
- Mouillage Fouquet, a rural settlement in the Sud department of Haiti
