= List of Live with Kelly episodes =

Live with Kelly was the title of a long-running American syndicated morning talk show that aired from 2011–12 and 2016–17. Kelly Ripa was the host in that period.

== First era (2011–12) ==
=== November 2011 ===
Date	Guest Co-Host	"Host Chat"	Guests/Segments	"Kelly's Inbox"
November 21	Jerry Seinfeld	Yes	LIVE! with Kelly Premiere Episode, Jason Segel	No
November 22	Jerry Seinfeld	Yes	Kim Cattrall, Tony Stewart, Jamie Oliver	No
November 23	Jerry Seinfeld	Yes	Howie Mandel, Miss Piggy, Holiday Gift Ideas	No
November 25	Jerry O'Connell	Yes	Nathan Fillion, Jane Lynch, Josh Capon	No
November 28	Neil Patrick Harris	Yes	Angie Harmon, Avril Lavigne	Yes
November 29	Neil Patrick Harris	Yes	Betty White, Molly Sims, Cobra Starship featuring Sabi	No
November 30	Neil Patrick Harris	Yes	Jaime Pressly, Kristen Johnston, Hot Chelle Rae	No

=== December 2011 ===
Date	Guest Co-Host	"Host Chat"	Guests/Segments	"Kelly's Inbox"
December 1	Neil Patrick Harris	Yes	Marcia Cross, Science Bob	No
December 2	Neil Patrick Harris	Yes	Maya Rudolph, Matt Czuchry	Yes
December 5	Derek Hough	Yes	Jeffrey Donovan, Elizabeth Olsen, LIVE's Holiday Feast Week	No
December 6	Jonah Hill	Yes	Sarah Jessica Parker, Emily VanCamp, LIVE's Holiday Feast Week	No
December 7	Josh Groban	Yes	Zac Efron, LIVE's Holiday Feast Week	No
December 8	Josh Groban	Yes	Jessica Biel, LIVE's Holiday Feast Week	Yes
December 9	Josh Groban	Yes	Charlize Theron, Abigail Breslin, Cody Simpson, LIVE's Holiday Feast Week	No
December 12	Taye Diggs	Yes	David Hyde Pierce, The Amazing Race Winners, Holiday Gift Guide – Chris Byrne	No
December 13	Kevin Jonas	Yes	Michelle Pfeiffer, Anthony Hamilton, Holiday Gift Guide – Matt Bean	No
December 14	Bryant Gumbel	Yes	Jude Law, The Biggest Loser Winner, Rachel Crow, Holiday Gift Guide – Lawrence Zarian	Yes
December 15	Michael Bublé	Yes	Robert Downey Jr., Lady Antebellum, Holiday Gift Guide – David Pogue	No
December 16	Michael Bublé	Yes	Daniel Craig, Holiday Gift Guide – Kelly	No
December 19	Mark Consuelos	Yes	Rooney Mara, Disney on Ice, Lady Antebellum	No
December 20	Mark Consuelos	Yes	LIVE's Home for the Holidays Special, Scarlett Johansson, Radio City Rockettes, Joaquin Consuelos, Voca People	No
December 23	Mark Consuelos	Yes	LIVE's Holiday Memories Special	No

=== January 2012 ===
Date	Guest Co-Host	"Host Chat"	Guests/Segments	"Kelly's Inbox"
January 2	Mark Consuelos	Yes	Tyra Banks, Ben Flajnik, New Year's Fitness Week – Turbo Kick	No
January 3	Jim Parsons	Yes	William H. Macy, Isaac Mizrahi, New Year's Fitness Week – P90X	No
January 4	David Duchovny	Yes	Terrence Howard, New Year's Fitness Week – Brooke Burke	Yes
January 5	Rob Lowe	Yes	Darren Criss, New Year's Fitness Week – Zumba	No
January 6	Rob Lowe	Yes	Kristen Bell, Jennifer Morrison, New Year's Fitness Week – TRX Suspension Training	No
January 9	Reggie Bush	Yes	Mark Wahlberg, Meal Makeover Week – Jorge Cruise	No
January 10	Carl Edwards	Yes	Kate Beckinsale, Laura Prepon, Meal Makeover Week – Tanya Zuckerbrot	No
January 11	Boomer Esiason	Yes	Jane Krakowski, Mike "The Situation" Sorrentino, Meal Makeover Week – Melina Jampolis	No
January 12	Jesse Palmer	Yes	Dolly Parton, Miranda Cosgrove, Meal Makeover Week – Wendy Bazilian, Lucy the World's Smallest Working Dog, LIVE's Hawaiian Dream Wedding Giveaway Finalists	No
January 13	Apolo Anton Ohno	Yes	Lana Parrilla, Common, Meal Makeover Week – Heidi Skolnik	No
January 16	Seth Meyers	Yes	Simon Baker, Kevin Hart, LIVE's Hawaiian Dream Wedding Giveaway Week	No
January 17	Seth Meyers	Yes	Jessica Alba, Matt Bomer, LIVE's Hawaiian Dream Wedding Giveaway Week	Yes
January 18	Mario Lopez	Yes	Marg Helgenberger, Mark Feuerstein, LIVE's Hawaiian Dream Wedding Giveaway Week	No
January 19	Dana Carvey	Yes	Ewan McGregor, Elizabeth Banks, LIVE's Hawaiian Dream Wedding Giveaway Week	No
January 20	Dana Carvey	Yes	Carla Gugino, Building a Better Toolbox, LIVE's Hawaiian Dream Wedding Giveaway Week	No
January 23	Kim Kardashian	Yes	Lucy Lawless, Kevin McHale, Peter Gros' Animals, Announcement of LIVE's Hawaiian Dream Wedding Winners	No
January 24	Mary J. Blige	Yes	Cynthia Nixon, Chris Harrison	No
January 25	Kristin Chenoweth	Yes	Alan Cumming, Emmy Rossum, Ingrid Michaelson	No
January 26	Cat Deeley	Yes	Nick Jonas, Rachael Ray	Yes
January 27	Carrie Ann Inaba	Yes	Chelsea Handler, Winter Health Tips for Dogs, Check-In with Las Vegas GNO	No
January 30	Dan Abrams	Yes	Channing Tatum, Announcement of Girl's Night Out: New York Edition Winners	Yes
January 31	Daniel Radcliffe	Yes	Rachel McAdams, Preview of The Women in Black, Carson Kressley with Winners of LIVE's Hawaiian Dream Wedding Giveaway	No

=== February 2012 ===
Date	Guest Co-Host	"Host Chat"	Guests/Segments	"Kelly's Inbox"
February 1	Howie Mandel	Yes	Jennifer Lopez, Girls' Generation, Preview of Mobbed, Kelly's GNO: New York Edition	No
February 2	Peter Facinelli	Yes	Michelle Williams, Nicole Polizzi & Jenni Farley, Kelly's GNO: New York Edition	Yes
February 3	D. L. Hughley	Yes	Ashley Greene, Leo Laporte, Kelly's GNO: New York Edition Recap	No
February 6	Derek Hough	Yes	Debra Messing, Atticus Shaffer, Sally Hogshead	No
February 7	Michael Strahan	Yes	Sarah Michelle Gellar, Michael Weatherly	Yes
February 8	Michael Strahan	Yes	Denzel Washington, Justin Tuck, Vanessa Hudgens	No
February 9	Jerry O'Connell	Yes	Ryan Reynolds, Sammi Giancola & Deena Cortese	No
February 10	Jerry O'Connell	Yes	Dwayne Johnson, Rebecca Romijn, ReallyWed vs. NearlyWed	No
February 13	Randy Jackson	Yes	Reese Witherspoon, Katharine McPhee	No
February 14	Randy Jackson	Yes	Idris Elba, Christina Perri, DC Cupcakes	No
February 15	Tony Potts	Yes	Ricky Martin & Nicki Minaj, Khloé Kardashian	No
February 16	Josh Groban	Yes	Tracy Morgan, Paul DelVecchio, Ronnie Ortiz-Magro & Vinny Guadagnino	No
February 17	Josh Groban	Yes	Nicolas Cage, Chris Byrne, Wedding Gown Shopping with Carson Kressley	No
February 20	Daniel Dae Kim	Yes	LIVE! at Aulani in Hawaii: Jon Cryer, Kelly goes Whale-Watching with Carson Kressley, Derek Hough dances with the Wedding Couple	No
February 21	Matthew Morrison	Yes	LIVE! at Aulani in Hawaii: Jorge Garcia, Kelly and Matthew get a Hula Lesson, Tour of Pearl Harbor, Wedding Preview	No
February 22	Carrie Ann Inaba	Yes	LIVE! at Aulani in Hawaii: Patricia Heaton, Carson Kressley, Tastes of Hawaii, Rehearsal Dinner Preview	No
February 23	Mark Consuelos	Yes	LIVE! at Aulani in Hawaii: Rico Rodriguez, Cobra Starship, Hawaiian Wedding Traditions, Mark takes the wedding party surfing	No
February 24	Mark Consuelos	Yes	LIVE! at Aulani in Hawaii: LIVE's Hawaiian Dream Wedding including Colbie Caillat	No
February 27	Neil Patrick Harris	Yes	LIVE! with Kelly After Oscar Show: Octavia Spencer, Jean Dujardin, The Cast of The Artist, Isaac Mizrahi, Maria Menounos, Lawrence Zarian, Uggie	No
February 28	Lucy Liu	Yes	Kristin Chenoweth, Poppy Montgomery, Hawaiian Dream Wedding Reception, Nokia Phone Giveaway	No
February 29	Alec Baldwin	Yes	Larry the Cable Guy, Taylor Kitsch, Leaping Animals from SeaWorld and Busch Gardens	No

=== March 2012 ===
Date	Guest Co-Host	"Host Chat"	Guests/Segments	"Kelly's Inbox"
March 1	Dan Abrams	Yes	Don Cheadle, Ben McKenzie, 5-Minute Mug Cake	No
March 2	Dan Abrams	Yes	Anjelica Huston, Donnie Wahlberg	Yes
March 5	Nick Lachey	Yes	Kristin Davis, Alison Sweeney, Spring Cleaning Week – Kristin Van Ogtrop, A Big Announcement	No
March 6	Nick Lachey	Yes	Fran Drescher, Chris Paul, Spring Cleaning Week – Stephen Fanuka	No
March 7	Pat Kiernan	Yes	Willem Dafoe, Leslie Bibb, Spring Cleaning Week – Carley Roney	No
March 8	Martin Short	Yes	Ewan McGregor, Spring Cleaning Week – Katie Brown	No
March 9	Martin Short	Yes	Kathy Bates, Big Time Rush, Spring Cleaning Week – Viewer Tips	No
March 12	Kyle MacLachlan	Yes	Nicole Richie, Cee Lo Green, Jeremy Rosado	Yes
March 13	Mark Consuelos	Yes	Will Ferrell, Elle Macpherson, Lindzi Cox, Mark in I Hate My Teenage Daughter	No
March 14	Michael Strahan	Yes	Susan Sarandon, Jeremy Sisto	Yes
March 15	Michael Strahan	Yes	Ashley Judd, Whitney Cummings	Yes
March 16	Michael Strahan	Yes	John Larroquette, Mary McCormack	No
March 19	Nick Lachey	Yes	Ice Cube, Joan Collins, Jennifer Goldstein	No
March 26	Jerry O'Connell	Yes	Kate Winslet, Lily Collins	No

=== April 2012 ===
Date	Guest Co-Host	"Host Chat"	Guests/Segments	"Kelly's Inbox"
April 2	Mark Consuelos	Yes	LIVE! in Banff, Alberta: Jason Biggs, Heejun Han, Scott Harrison, Mark goes Dogsledding	No
April 3	Chris Harrison	Yes	LIVE! in Banff, Alberta: Caroline Rhea, Jayma Mays, Far East Movement, The Calgary Fiddlers, Gelman goes Catskiing	No
April 4	Peter Facinelli	Yes	LIVE! in Banff, Alberta: Johnny Galecki, Melanie Fiona, Kelly goes Snowshoeing	No
April 5	Ben Mulroney	Yes	LIVE! in Banff, Alberta: David James Elliott, Chef Martin Luthi, Kelly goes Torchlight Skiing	No
April 9	Howie Mandel	Yes	Sofía Vergara, L.A. Reid, DeAndre Brackensick, Debut of LIVE's New Set, House DJ Week – Samantha Ronson	No
April 10	Howie Mandel	Yes	Christina Applegate, Gabourey Sidibe, House DJ Week – DJ Pauly D	No
April 11	Carson Kressley	Yes	Cheryl Hines, Monica & Brandy, New York International Auto Show, House DJ Week – DJ Cassidy	No
April 12	Joel McHale	Yes	Laura Linney, Bradley Whitford, New York International Auto Show – Wow! Cars, House DJ Week – Chrissie Miller	No
April 13	Joel McHale	Yes	John Slattery, Martha Plimpton, New York International Auto Show – SUVs, House DJ Week – DJ Twist	No
April 16	D. L. Hughley	Yes	Ice-T, Paul Wesley	Yes
April 17	D. L. Hughley	Yes	Julia Louis-Dreyfus, Ronnie Wood, Jane Goodall	No
April 18	Mike Greenberg	Yes	Olivia Wilde, Kevin Hart, Science Bob	No
April 19	Seth Meyers	Yes	Zac Efron, Ana Gasteyer, Karina Smirnoff and Gavin DeGraw	No
April 20	Seth Meyers	Yes	Candice Bergen, Eva LaRue, Peter Gros	Yes
April 23	Jesse Palmer	Yes	Kate Walsh, Colton Dixon, 5-Minute French Toast	No
April 24	Jesse Palmer	Yes	Hugh Grant, Blair Underwood, Latest Prom Trends	No
April 25	Mario Lopez	Yes	Kathleen Turner, James Van Der Beek, Ashanti	Yes
April 26	Matthew Broderick	Yes	Jenna Fischer, Garry Marshall, Katherine Jenkins and Mark Ballas	No
April 27	Mark Consuelos	Yes	Maggie Q, Daughtry, Announcement of LIVE's Top Teacher Search Finalists	Yes
April 30	Pat Kiernan	Yes	Donald Trump, Elise Testone, Face Yoga	Yes

=== May 2012 ===
Date	Guest Co-Host	"Host Chat"	Guests/Segments	"Kelly's Inbox"
May 1	Pat Kiernan	Yes	Daniel Dae Kim, Samantha Ronson, Guide to Sunglasses, Top 5 Finalists in LIVE's Top Teacher Search	No
May 2	Josh Groban	Yes	Mark Ruffalo, Lisa Rinna, Jeremy Britt	No
May 3	Josh Groban	Yes	Sissy Spacek, Beth Behrs	Yes
May 4	Ben Mulroney	Yes	Nathan Fillion, Chef Aarón Sánchez, William Polley	No
May 7	Michael Strahan	Yes	Cameron Diaz, Skylar Laine, Money for Moms Week	No
May 8	Michael Strahan	Yes	Stephen Colbert, Miss USA 2012 Contestants, Money for Moms Week	No
May 9	Michael Strahan	Yes	Chace Crawford, Karmin, Money for Moms Week	Yes
May 10	Nick Lachey	Yes	Ginnifer Goodwin, Roshon Fegan & Chelsie Hightower, Money for Moms Week	Yes
May 11	Nick Lachey	Yes	Felicity Huffman, Vanessa Lachey, Kip Moore, Money for Moms Week	No
May 14	Jimmy Kimmel	Yes	Chris Colfer, Hollie Cavanagh, Top Teacher Week – Danielle Greco	No
May 15	Sam Champion	Yes	LL Cool J, James Morrison, Top Teacher Week – Wendy Martin	No
May 16	Chris Harrison	Yes	Billy Bob Thornton, Eli Manning, Top Teacher Week – Monica Dunn	No
May 17	Chris Harrison	Yes	Christina Hendricks, Maria Menounos & Derek Hough, Top Teacher Week – Bryan Sawyer	Yes
May 18	Reggie Bush	Yes	Tom Selleck, Krysten Ritter, Top Teacher Week – Kristin Golia	No
May 21	Taye Diggs	Yes	Robin Thicke, Emily Maynard, Chad Qian	No
May 22	L. A. Reid	Yes	Jimmy Fallon, Kris Allen, Announcement of Top Teacher Week Winner	Yes
May 23	Seth Meyers	Yes	Josh Brolin, Donald Driver & Peta Murgatroyd	Yes
May 24	Seth Meyers	Yes	Kevin Costner, Katherine Jenkins & Mark Ballas, William Levy & Cheryl Burke	Yes
May 25	Seth Meyers	Yes	Bill Paxton, Judith Light, Road Trip Car Games	No
May 28	Mark Consuelos	Yes	Jim Parsons, Pawn Stars, Outdoor Games	No
May 29	Ed Robertson	Yes	Amy Brenneman, Jessica Sanchez	Yes
May 30	Martin Short	Yes	Melissa Joan Hart, Joshua Ledet, Clip from Madagascar 3	No
May 31	Mike Greenberg	Yes	Kristen Stewart, Bill Hader	Yes

=== June 2012 ===
Date	Guest Co-Host	"Host Chat"	Guests/Segments	"Kelly's Inbox"
June 1	Mike Greenberg	Yes	Chris Hemsworth, Cirque du Soleil's Zarkana, Grilling with the Stars – Joey Lawrence	No
June 4	Bryant Gumbel	Yes	Cat Deeley, Gavin DeGraw, Snigdha Nandipati	No
June 5	Bryant Gumbel	Yes	Jenny McCarthy, Olivia Culpo, Healthy Grilling Tips	No
June 6	Neil Patrick Harris	Yes	Julianne Hough, Kerry Washington, Animal Super Dads from SeaWorld and Busch Gardens	No
June 7	Neil Patrick Harris	Yes	Jessica Chastain, Emeli Sandé, Chris Byrne	No
June 8	Andy Samberg	Yes	Chris Rock, Patrick Duffy, Grilling with the Stars – Marilu Henner, Clip from That's My Boy	No
June 11	Jerry O'Connell	Yes	Noah Wyle, Bristol Palin, Summer Dog Care Tips	No
June 12	Jerry O'Connell	Yes	Ben Stiller, Michael Ealy, Grilling with the Stars – Raven-Symoné	No
June 18	Bryant Gumbel	Yes	Michelle Obama, Marc Forgione, Cary Family YMCA Superskippers	No
June 19	Nick Lachey	Yes	Mary J. Blige, Mark Feuerstein, Rita Wilson, Cat Cora	No
June 25	Carrie Ann Inaba	Yes	Chris Pine, Andy Cohen, Blues Traveler	No
June 26	Tyler Perry	Yes	Emma Stone, Joe Manganiello, Chris Bosh, Psychic Week – Sylvia Browne	Yes
June 27	Michael Strahan	Yes	Andrew Garfield, Seth MacFarlane, Psychic Week – Theresa Caputo	No
June 28	Michael Strahan	Yes	Channing Tatum, Carly Rae Jepsen, Psychic Week – Char Margolis	No
June 29	Michael Strahan	Yes	Matthew McConaughey, Grilling with the Stars – Ashanti, Psychic Week – Sonya Fitzpatrick	No

=== July 2012 ===
Date	Guest Co-Host	"Host Chat"	Guests/Segments	"Kelly's Inbox"
July 2	Michael Strahan	Yes	Sally Field, Exotic Rainforest Animals from San Diego Zoo	Yes
July 3	Michael Strahan	Yes	John Travolta, will.i.am & Eva Simons	Yes
July 4	Kevin Jonas	Yes	LIVE's July 4 Party: Blake Lively, Cody Simpson, LIVE's Independence Day Games	No
July 5	Carrie Ann Inaba	Yes	Salma Hayek, Rhys Ifans	Yes
July 6	Mark Feuerstein	Yes	Rose Byrne, Grilling with the Stars – Caroline Manzo	Yes
July 9	Seth Meyers	Yes	Kyra Sedgwick, Eric McCormack, Date Night Makeover Week	No
July 10	Seth Meyers	Yes	Matt Bomer, Allison Williams, Date Night Makeover Week	Yes
July 11	Seth Meyers	Yes	Glenn Close, Elijah Wood, Date Night Makeover Week	Yes
July 12	Seth Meyers	Yes	Anne Hathaway, John Leguizamo, Date Night Makeover Week	Yes
July 13	Seth Meyers	Yes	Ray Romano, Grilling with the Stars – Kristen Johnston, Date Night Makeover Week	No
July 16	Josh Groban	Yes	Kristin Davis, LIVE's Coast-to-Coast Co-Host Search Challenge #1	Yes
July 17	Josh Groban	Yes	Gary Oldman, Nicole Polizzi & Jenni Farley, LIVE's Coast-to-Coast Co-Host Search Challenge #2	Yes
July 18	Josh Groban	Yes	Jesse Metcalfe, Victor Cruz, LIVE's Coast-to-Coast Co-Host Search Challenge #3	No
July 19	Jerry O'Connell	Yes	Heidi Klum, LIVE's Coast-to-Coast Co-Host Search Challenge #4	No
July 20	Rob Thomas	Yes	John Stamos, Grilling with the Stars – Carla Gugino, LIVE's Coast-to-Coast Co-Host Search Challenges #5 & #6	No
July 23	Mark Consuelos	Yes	Vince Vaughn, Grilling with the Stars – Mike "The Situation" Sorrentino	No
July 24	Michael Buckley	Yes	Will Ferrell, Emily Maynard, Andrew Zimmern	Yes
July 25	Joel McHale	Yes	Zach Galifianakis, John Rich	Yes
July 26	Joel McHale	Yes	Dylan McDermott, Josh Henderson	Yes
July 27	Joel McHale	Yes	Olivia Munn, Grilling with the Stars – Lou Diamond Phillips, Skipper Bivins & Trent Jackson	No
July 30	Chris Harrison	Yes	Jeremy Renner, Zachary Gordon, Diet Week – Dr. William Davis	No
July 31	Chris Harrison	Yes	Rachel Weisz, Diet Week – Dr. Mark Hyman	No

=== August 2012 ===
Date	Guest Co-Host	"Host Chat"	Guests/Segments	"Kelly's Inbox"
August 1	Nick Lachey	Yes	Carson Kressley, Joss Stone, Diet Week – Dr. Mike Moreno	Yes
August 2	Nick Lachey	Yes	Caroline Rhea, Joey Fatone, Diet Week – Dr. Joel Fuhrman	Yes
August 3	Nick Lachey	Yes	Amy Adams, Vanessa L. Williams, Marilu Henner wins Grilling with the Stars, Diet Week – Dr. Arthur Agatston	Yes
August 13	Carrie Ann Inaba	Yes	Lisa Kudrow, Larry Hagman	No
August 14	Chris Harrison	Yes	Jordin Sparks, Dr. Greg Yapalater	No
August 20	Nick Lachey	Yes	Shia LaBeouf, Tim Gunn	No

=== September 2012 ===
Date	Host	"Host Chat"	Guests/Segments	"Kelly's Inbox"
September 3	Kelly Ripa	Yes	Howie Mandel, Ana Gasteyer, Trisha Yearwood	No

== Second era (2016–17) ==
=== May 2016 ===
Date	Guest co-host	"Host chat"	Guests / segments	"Kelly's Inbox"
May 16	Jimmy Kimmel	Yes	Gordon Ramsay, Priyanka Chopra, American Authors	No
May 17	Jussie Smollett	Yes	Andy Samberg, Michael Weatherly, Co-Host Karaoke Challenge	No
May 18	Cedric the Entertainer	Yes	Zac Efron, Josh Gad, Co-Host Dance Challenge	No
May 19	David Muir	Yes	Julianne Moore, Rose Byrne, Co-Host Challenge	Yes
May 20	Daniel Dae Kim	Yes	Blake Shelton, Science Bob	No
May 23	Fred Savage	Yes	Emilia Clarke, JoJo Fletcher, LIVE's Take Charge of Your Food Week – Dr. Taz Bhalia	No
May 24	Fred Savage	Yes	Anna Paquin, James McAvoy, LIVE's Take Charge of Your Food Week – Dr. Tanya Altman	No
May 25	Seal	Yes	Stephen Amell, Nyle DiMarco & Peta Murgatroyd, Paige VanZant & Mark Ballas, LIVE's Take Charge of Your Food Week – Dr. Joel Fuhrman	No
May 26	Andy Cohen	Yes	Megan Fox, Alisan Porter, LIVE's Take Charge of Your Food Week – Rebecca Katz	No
May 27	Andy Cohen	Yes	Tyler Perry, Lizzy Kaplan, LIVE's Take Charge of Your Food Week – Richard Blais	No
May 30	Jussie Smollett	Yes	Mariah Carey, Chris Byrne	No
May 31	Common	Yes	Maya Rudolph, Nihar Janga & Jairam Hathwar, LIVE's Summer Shred Workout Week – Not So Common Workout	No

=== June 2016 ===
Date	Guest co-host	"Host chat"	Guests / segments	"Kelly's Inbox"
June 1	Anderson Cooper	Yes	Gloria Estefan, X Ambassadors, LIVE's Summer Shred Workout Week – LYLA Hoop Workout	No
June 2	Anderson Cooper	Yes	Beth Behrs, Alexander Jean, LIVE's Summer Shred Workout Week – X-Treme Firefighters' Workout	No
June 3	Mark Consuelos	Yes	Laura Linney, Paula Abdul, Alex Guarnaschelli, LIVE's Summer Shred Workout Week – Stability Ball Workout	No
June 6	D. L. Hughley	Yes	Eric Dane, Freddie Prinze Jr.	Yes
June 7	Joel McHale	Yes	James Corden, Deshauna Barber	Yes
June 8	Joel McHale	Yes	Ethan Hawke, Marc Anthony, Dan + Shay	Yes
June 9	Ryan Seacrest	Yes	Mark Ruffalo, Paula Patton, Michael Franti & Spearhead	No
June 10	Alec Baldwin	Yes	Dwayne Johnson, Aaron Tveit	No
June 13	Morris Chestnut	Yes	Trevor Noah, Sabrina Carpenter, Frankie Ballard	Yes
June 14	Jerry O'Connell	Yes	Jeff Goldblum, NeNe Leakes	Yes
June 15	Jerry O'Connell	Yes	Ed O'Neill, Michiel Huisman, Brandy Clarke	No
June 16	Kevin Hart	Yes	Martin Short, Ana Gasteyer, Carley Roney	No
June 17	Mark Consuelos	Yes	Matthew McConaughey, Tony Hale, Kevin Curry	No
June 20	John Leguizamo	Yes	Liam Hemsworth, Anna Chlumsky, Dr. Wendy Bazilian	No
June 21	Josh Groban	Yes	Oprah Winfrey, Brooke Shields	No
June 27	D. L. Hughley	Yes	Alexander Skarsgard, Merle Dandridge	No
June 28	Anderson Cooper	Yes	Scott Speedman, Mel B, Dr. Greg Yapalater	No

=== July 2016 ===
Date	Guest co-host	"Host chat"	Guests / segments	"Kelly's Inbox"
July 4	Cedric the Entertainer	Yes	LIVE's July 4 Party: Zac Efron, Blake Shelton, Katie Brown, LIVE's July 4 Games	No
July 5	Jim Parsons	Yes	Denis Leary, Omari Hardwick, A Great Big World	No
July 6	Jim Parsons	Yes	50 Cent, Julia Stiles, Pound Rockout Workout	Yes
July 7	Dwyane Wade	Yes	Eric Stonestreet, Magic!	No
July 8	Guillermo Diaz	Yes	Queen Latifah, Laverne Cox, Adam Richman	No
July 11	Carrie Ann Inaba	Yes	Bryan Cranston, Constance Zimmer, Meaghan Murphy	No
July 12	Carrie Ann Inaba	Yes	Jesse Tyler Ferguson, Leslie Jones, Ben Rector	Yes
July 13	Fred Savage	Yes	Blake Lively, Rami Malek, Andrew Zimmern	No
July 14	Fred Savage	Yes	Kristen Stewart, Kate McKinnon	Yes
July 15	Fred Savage	Yes	Melissa McCarthy, Jose Juarez	No
July 18	Andy Cohen	Yes	Zoe Saldaña, Craig Bierko, Joey Kratochvil	Yes
July 19	Keegan-Michael Key	Yes	Chris Pine, Allison Janney	No
July 20	Keegan-Michael Key	Yes	Mila Kunis, Jessie J	No
July 21	Tony Goldwyn	Yes	Seth Meyers, Pokémon Go 101	Yes
July 22	Taye Diggs	Yes	Idris Elba, Eric LeVine	No
July 25	Christian Slater	Yes	Zachary Quinto, Lou Diamond Phillips, LIVE's Dog Days of Summer Week – Dog Grooming Tips	No
July 26	Alan Cumming	Yes	Alicia Vikander, Joel Kinnaman, LIVE's Dog Days of Summer Week – Twinkie the Dog	No
July 27	Jerry O'Connell	Yes	Joe Jonas, LIVE's Dog Days of Summer Week – Bernadette Peters, Medical Breakthrough Tips	Yes
July 28	Jerry O'Connell	Yes	Matt Damon, Jai Courtney, Pentatonix, LIVE's Dog Days of Summer Week – Andrea Arden	No
July 29	Jerry O'Connell	Yes	Margot Robbie, Ato Essandoh, Chris Oh, LIVE's Dog Days of Summer Week – Me Ra Koh	No

=== August 2016 ===
Date	Guest co-host	"Host chat"	Guests / segments	"Kelly's Inbox"
August 1	Anderson Cooper	Yes	John Corbett, Adewale, Summer in the City Ambush Makeover Week	Yes
August 2	Anderson Cooper	Yes	Viola Davis, Jordan Rodgers & JoJo Fletcher, Summer in the City Ambush Makeover Week	No
August 3	Josh Gad	Yes	Jonah Hill, Bryce Dallas Howard, Summer in the City Ambush Makeover Week	No
August 4	Josh Gad	Yes	Miles Teller, Carla Gugino, Summer in the City Ambush Makeover Week	Yes
August 5	Nick Lachey	Yes	Jamie Dornan, 98 Degrees, Eric Ripert, Summer in the City Ambush Makeover Week	No

=== September 2016 ===
Date	Guest co-host	"Host chat"	Guests / segments	"Kelly's Inbox"
September 5	Christian Slater	Yes	DJ Khaled, Maura Tierney, Joaquin Consuelos	No
September 6	Morris Chestnut	Yes	Chris Noth, Bradley Whitford, Martina McBride	Yes
September 7	Morris Chestnut	Yes	Aaron Eckhart, Ben McKenzie	Yes
September 8	Anderson Cooper	Yes	Meg Ryan, George Eads	Yes
September 9	Anderson Cooper	Yes	Jessica Alba, Terrence Howard	No
September 12	Chris Harrison	Yes	Patrick Dempsey, Sophia Loren, Angelique Kerber, Stan Wawrinka	No
September 13	Michael Weatherly	Yes	Joseph Gordon-Levitt, Carol Burnett, Savvy Shields	No
September 14	Neil Patrick Harris	Yes	Renée Zellweger, Jaimie Alexander, Vern Yip	No
September 15	Neil Patrick Harris	Yes	Colin Firth, Bill O'Reilly, Jacob Whitesides	No
September 16	Neil Patrick Harris	Yes	Alan Cumming, Paige VanZant, David Burtka, AJR	No
September 19	Busy Philipps	Yes	Kevin James, Rachael Harris, Mike Posner	Yes
September 20	Jussie Smollett	Yes	Jada Pinkett Smith, Scott Bakula	Yes
September 21	Jussie Smollett	Yes	Kiefer Sutherland, Ken Jeong	No
September 22	Mark Consuelos	Yes	Juliette Lewis, Brad Keselowski	No
September 23	Chris Pratt	Yes	Denzel Washington, Cast of Impractical Jokers	No
September 26	Josh Groban	Yes	Rob Lowe, Will Forte	No
September 27	Josh Groban	Yes	Samuel L. Jackson, Mandy Moore, Kristin Chenoweth	Yes
September 28	Jerry O'Connell	Yes	Tom Selleck, January Jones, Ingrid Michaelson	Yes
September 29	Jerry O'Connell	Yes	Morgan Freeman, Ramy Gafni	No
September 30	Jerry O'Connell	Yes	Mark Wahlberg, Priyanka Chopra	No

=== October 2016 ===
Date	Guest co-host	"Host chat"	Guests / segments	"Kelly's Inbox"
October 3	Jerry O'Connell	Yes	Kenan Thompson, Chris Gethard, Jerry Visits Cirque du Soleil – KURIOS	No
October 4	Fred Savage	Yes	Justin Theroux, Lindsey Vonn, Melissa Etheridge	No
October 5	Fred Savage	Yes	Ted Danson, Tom Odell, Announcement of LIVE with Kelly and You Finalists	No
October 6	Fred Savage	Yes	Ben Affleck, Danai Gurira	Yes
October 7	Ashton Kutcher	Yes	Sarah Paulson, Laura Prepon, Colbie Caillat	No
October 10	Zachary Quinto	Yes	Jeffrey Dean Morgan, Jennifer Morrison, Cast of Impractical Jokers	Yes
October 11	Tyler Perry	Yes	Bryan Cranston, Aly Raisman, Carson Kressley	Yes
October 12	Anderson Cooper	Yes	Jon Hamm, Minnie Driver, Daya, Announcement of LIVE with Kelly and You Finalists	Yes
October 13	Carrie Ann Inaba	Yes	Tea Leoni, Norman Reedus, Andy Grammer	No
October 14	Carrie Ann Inaba	Yes	J. K. Simmons, Gavin DeGraw, Extreme Pumpkins, Announcement of LIVE with Kelly and You Finalists	Yes
October 17	Sam Champion	Yes	Vin Diesel, Carole Bayer Sager, LIVE with Kelly and You Challenge #1	No
October 18	Matt Bomer	Yes	David Hyde Pierce, Victoria Justice, LIVE with Kelly and You Challenge #2	No
October 19	Ciara	Yes	Ewan McGregor, Jeff Gordon, Zay Hilfigerrr & Zayion McCall, LIVE with Kelly and You Challenge #3	No
October 20	John Leguizamo	Yes	Matt LeBlanc, Dakota Fanning, LIVE with Kelly and You Challenge #4	No
October 21	Richard Curtis	Yes	Elijah Wood, Sullivan Stapleton, America's Biggest Pumpkin	Yes
October 24	Michael Bublé	Yes	Tom Hanks, LIVE's Halloween Hacks!!! Week – Monica Mangin	No
October 25	Michael Bublé	Yes	John Lithgow, Phil Collins, Tyler Glenn, LIVE's Halloween Hacks!!! Week – Halloween Makeup	Yes
October 26	Michael Bublé	Yes	Blair Underwood, Abbi Jacobson, LIVE's Halloween Hacks!!! Week – 10 Spookiest Doors	No
October 27	Joel McHale	Yes	Uzo Aduba, Daniel Sunjata, LIVE's Halloween Hacks!!! Week – Haunted Houses	No
October 28	Joel McHale	Yes	Jeremy Irons, Elliot & Giana Storey, LIVE's Halloween Hacks!!! Week – 5-Minute Costumes	No
October 31	Jerry O'Connell	Yes	LIVE's Best Halloween Show Ever: Decision 2016, Kevin James	No

=== November 2016 ===
Date	Guest co-host	"Host chat"	Guests / segments	"Kelly's Inbox"
November 1	Scott Wolf	Yes	Benedict Cumberbatch, Gabrielle Union	Yes
November 2	Vince Vaughn	Yes	Donnie Wahlberg, Lauren Cohan	Yes
November 3	Christian Slater	Yes	Kal Penn, Rachel Bloom, O.A.R.	No
November 4	Christian Slater	Yes	Kyra Sedgwick, Josh Radnor	Yes
November 7	Richard Curtis	Yes	Sarah Jessica Parker, Jared Padalecki, Dr. Greg Yapalater	No
November 8	Tony Goldwyn	Yes	Miles Teller, Daveed Diggs	No
November 9	Megyn Kelly	Yes	Naomi Watts, Michael Ealy, Cam	No
November 10	Alex Rodriguez	Yes	Amy Adams, Kyle Schwarber	No
November 11	Chris Hardwick	Yes	Jeremy Renner, Michelle Dockery	Yes
November 14	Billy Gardell	Yes	Aaron Eckhart, Ali Wentworth, LIVE's Homestyle Thanksgiving Week – Ming Tsai	No
November 15	Andy Cohen	Yes	Billy Bob Thornton, Robert Wagner, LIVE's Homestyle Thanksgiving Week – Evelyn Cohen	No
November 16	Ryan Seacrest	Yes	Trevor Noah, OneRepublic, LIVE's Homestyle Thanksgiving Week – Kelly	No
November 17	Ryan Seacrest	Yes	Dennis Quaid, Sterling K. Brown, LIVE's Homestyle Thanksgiving Week – Connie Seacrest	No
November 18	Ryan Seacrest	Yes	William H. Macy, Dev Patel, LIVE's Homestyle Thanksgiving Week – Rhoda Gelman	No
November 21	Max Greenfield	Yes	Maura Tierney, Katie Brown	No
November 22	Max Greenfield	Yes	Kristin Davis, 2016 NASCAR Sprint Cup Series Winner, Dr. Wendy Bazilian	No
November 23	Joe Jonas	Yes	Chris O'Donnell, Bernadette Peters	Yes
November 28	Billy Eichner	Yes	Felicity Jones, Travis Fimmel, LIVE's Holiday Gift Guide – Lawrence Zarian	No
November 29	Anderson Cooper	Yes	Bryshere Gray, Tim Tebow, LIVE's Holiday Gift Guide – Jon Wilde	No
November 30	Jeffrey Dean Morgan	Yes	Tim Daly, Diego Luna, LIVE's Holiday Gift Guide – Lindsay Miller	No

=== December 2016 ===
Date	Guest co-host	"Host chat"	Guests / segments	"Kelly's Inbox"
December 1	Mark Consuelos	Yes	Matt Czuchry, LIVE's Holiday Gift Guide – Chris Byrne	Yes
December 2	Busy Philipps	Yes	Randall Park, LIVE's Holiday Gift Guide – Lance Ulanoff	No
December 5	Corbin Bleu	Yes	Jason Bateman, Jeffrey Donovan	Yes
December 6	Ilana Glazer	Yes	Kate McKinnon, Riz Ahmed	Yes
December 7	Octavia Spencer	Yes	Chris Pratt, Courtney B. Vance, Chrissy Teigen	Yes
December 8	Scott Wolf	Yes	Annette Bening, Rita Ora, Sarah McLachlan	Yes
December 9	Taraji P. Henson	Yes	Katie Holmes, Kevin Nealon, Brett Eldredge	No
December 12	Richard Curtis	Yes	Bryan Cranston, Billie Lourd	Yes
December 13	Richard Curtis	Yes	Marion Cotillard, Peter Gros, Norah Jones	Yes
December 14	Richard Curtis	Yes	Michael Fassbender, Holiday Sweater Spectacular	No
December 15	Van Jones	Yes	Arnold Schwarzenegger, Elle Fanning	Yes
December 16	Mark Consuelos	Yes	Liam Neeson, Nick Cannon	Yes
December 19	Scott Wolf	Yes	Kevin Costner, Disney on Ice, LIVE's Holiday Games	No
December 20	John Mulaney	Yes	Sting, Eden Grinshpan, LIVE's Holiday Games	Yes
December 21	Christian Slater	Yes	LIVE's Christmas Party: Garth Brooks & Trisha Yearwood, Radio City Rockettes, Santa	No
December 26	n/a	No	LIVE's Viewer's Choice Show 2016	No

=== January 2017 ===
Date	Guest co-host	"Host chat"	Guests / segments	"Kelly's Inbox"
January 3	Mark Cuban	Yes	Queen Latifah, Megan Boone, New Year, New You Week – Dr. Wendy Bazilian	No
January 4	Chris Hardwick	Yes	Benjamin Bratt, Mahershala Ali, New Year, New You Week – Dr. Melina Jampolis	No
January 5	Chris Hardwick	Yes	Sienna Miller, Hayden Panettiere, New Year, New You Week – Shadowboxing	No
January 6	Chris Hardwick	Yes	Kate Beckinsale, Cameron Dallas, New Year, New You Week – Crunch Gym's Bungee Workout	No
January 9	Jerry O'Connell	Yes	Josh Holloway, Christopher Jackson	Yes
January 10	Jerry O'Connell	Yes	Kevin Bacon, Queen Latifah	Yes
January 11	Jerry O'Connell	Yes	Andrew Garfield, Tituss Burgess	Yes
January 12	John Leguizamo	Yes	Jude Law, Nia Long	Yes
January 13	Neil Patrick Harris	Yes	Denzel Washington, Margo Martindale	Yes
January 16	Mark Consuelos	Yes	Brendan Fraser, Lisa Rinna, Grace VanderWaal	No
January 17	Christian Slater	Yes	Viola Davis, Louie Anderson	Yes
January 18	Christian Slater	Yes	Idina Menzel, Nina Dobrev	Yes
January 19	Christian Slater	Yes	James McAvoy, Matthew McConaughey, Amanda Nunes	No
January 23	Anderson Cooper	Yes	Jimmy Smits, Melissa Benoist, Priyanka Chopra	No
January 24	Bellamy Young	Yes	John Goodman, Bridget Moynahan	Yes
January 25	Scott Wolf	Yes	Michael Keaton, Ali Larter, Andrea Arden	No
January 26	Scott Wolf	Yes	Mike Myers, Milla Jovovich	No
January 27	Scott Wolf	Yes	Christina Ricci, Lance Ulanoff, Train	No
January 30	Leslie Mann	Yes	Ricky Gervais, What the Hack? Week – Meaghan Murphy	Yes
January 31	Busy Philipps	Yes	Colin Hanks, What the Hack? Week – Kevin Pereira	No

=== February 2017 ===
Date	Guest co-host	"Host chat"	Guests / segments	"Kelly's Inbox"
February 1	Busy Philipps	Yes	Carla Gugino, What the Hack? Week – Katie Brown	No
February 2	Carrie Ann Inaba	Yes	Keanu Reeves, Jeff Perry, What the Hack? Week – Carson Kressley	No
February 3	Carrie Ann Inaba	Yes	LIVE's Pre Game Party: Edie Falco, Super Bowl Pigs, Myron Mixon and George Duran Cook-Off, What the Hack? Week – Super Bowl Hacks	No
February 6	Rita Ora	Yes	Tracee Ellis Ross, David Oyelowo, Iris Mittenaere	No
February 7	Mark Consuelos	Yes	Archie Panjabi, Nick Viall	Yes
February 8	Mark Consuelos	Yes	Erika Girardi, Holly Holm, Dr. Michael Breus	No
February 9	Jeffrey Dean Morgan	Yes	Will Arnett, Julian Edelman, Zosia Mamet	No
February 10	Jeffrey Dean Morgan	Yes	Jake Gyllenhaal, Daymond John, Ingrid Michaelson	Yes
February 13	David Muir	Yes	Kal Penn, James White, Jeremy Jordan	No
February 14	John Leguizamo	Yes	Laverne Cox, Adam Scott	Yes
February 15	John Leguizamo	Yes	Ricky Martin, Christine Baranski	Yes
February 16	Chris Harrison	Yes	Chrissy Metz, Timbaland, S. L. T. Workout	No
February 17	Chris Harrison	Yes	Malin Åkerman, Theresa Caputo, Bebe Rexha	No
February 20	Anderson Cooper	Yes	Shailene Woodley, Dr. Holly Phillips, LIVE's Oscar Countdown Games	No
February 21	Zach Braff	Yes	Allison Williams, Mae Whitman, LIVE's Oscar Countdown Games	No
February 22	Mark Consuelos	Yes	Famke Janssen, Michiel Huisman, LIVE's Oscar Countdown Games	No
February 23	Jason Derulo	Yes	Mary-Louise Parker, Chris Byrne, LIVE's Oscar Countdown Games	Yes
February 24	Jerry O'Connell	Yes	LIVE's Pre-Oscar Celebration: F. Murray Abraham, Oscar Memories and Flashbacks, LIVE's Oscar Countdown Games	No
February 27	Ryan Seacrest	Yes	LIVE's After Oscar Show: DJ Khaled, Flo Rida & 99 Percent, Jerry O'Connell; Sunny Pawar; Edward Barsamian, Louise Roe & Lawrence Zarian	No
February 28	Jerry O'Connell	Yes	Connie Britton, Ray Liotta, Kurt Busch	No

=== March 2017 ===
Date	Guest co-host	"Host chat"	Guests / segments	"Kelly's Inbox"
March 1	Jerry O'Connell	Yes	Milo Ventimiglia, David Boreanaz	Yes
March 2	Jerry O'Connell	Yes	Hugh Jackman, Josh Henderson	Yes
March 3	Jerry O'Connell	Yes	Octavia Spencer, Taran Killam, Mike Posner	Yes
March 6	Christian Slater	Yes	Matthew Rhys, Caroline Rhea, Auliʻi Cravalho	Yes
March 7	Christian Slater	Yes	Tom Hiddleston, Michelle Dockery	Yes
March 8	Christian Slater	Yes	Keri Russell, Jenna Elfman, Peter Gros	No
March 9	Christian Slater	Yes	Brie Larson, Peter Krause	Yes
March 10	Christian Slater	Yes	Felicity Huffman, Rupert Friend, Science Bob	No
March 13	Michael Weatherly	Yes	Stanley Tucci, Meaghan Murphy	No
March 14	Josh Gad	Yes	Elizabeth Banks, Jonny Lee Miller, Nick Viall	No
March 15	Jason Silva	Yes	Ice Cube, Axle Workout, Brain Games	Yes
March 16	Chris Hardwick	Yes	Jessica Lange, Jesse Williams, Medicine Ball Workout	Yes
March 17	Chris Hardwick	Yes	Bryan Cranston, Chad Michael Murray	No
March 20	Jeffrey Dean Morgan	Yes	Jennifer Lopez, John Lithgow	No
March 27	Mark Consuelos	Yes	Lisa Kudrow, Andrew McCarthy, Science Bob	No

=== April 2017 ===
Date	Guest co-host	"Host chat"	Guests / segments	"Kelly's Inbox"
April 3	Scott Wolf	Yes	Kate Walsh, Sarah Michelle Gellar	Yes
April 4	Scott Wolf	Yes	Sally Field, Ellie Kemper, Charo & Keo	No
April 5	Scott Wolf	Yes	Amanda Peet, Scott Eastwood	Yes
April 6	Scott Wolf	Yes	Pierce Brosnan, Mandy Patinkin	Yes
April 7	Scott Wolf	Yes	Jason Statham, Rashida Jones, Tim Morehouse	No
April 10	Morris Chestnut	Yes	Vin Diesel, LIVE's Auto Show Week – Sports Cars	Yes
April 11	Morris Chestnut	Yes	Sergio García, David Duchovny, Joey McIntyre, LIVE's Auto Show Week – SUVs	Yes
April 12	Morris Chestnut	Yes	Hank Azaria, Morris' Ab Workout, LIVE's Auto Show Week – Sedans	Yes
April 13	Carrie Ann Inaba	Yes	Anna Chlumsky, Katie Lowes, LIVE's Auto Show Week – Green Cars	Yes
April 14	Carrie Ann Inaba	Yes	Cynthia Nixon, Spring Safety Tips for Dogs, LIVE's Auto Show Week – High Performance Cars	No
April 17	Priyanka Chopra	Yes	Jennifer Hudson, Josh Lucas	No
April 18	Jussie Smollett	Yes	Kristin Chenoweth, Renée Elise Goldsberry, Erika Girardi & Gleb Savchenko	No
April 19	Jussie Smollett	Yes	Rose Byrne, Bella Thorne	Yes
April 20	Van Jones	Yes	Bob Odenkirk, Katherine Heigl	Yes
April 21	Van Jones	Yes	Rosario Dawson, Rick Schwartz, Zara Larsson & Clean Bandit	No
April 24	John Leguizamo	Yes	Cobie Smulders, Nikolaj Coster-Waldau	Yes
April 25	John Leguizamo	Yes	Caitlyn Jenner, Andrew Zimmern	No
April 26	John Leguizamo	Yes	John Legend, Molly Ringwald	No
April 27	John Leguizamo	Yes	America Ferrera, Darby Stanchfield	Yes
April 28	John Leguizamo	Yes	LL Cool J, Lea Michele	Yes
