= Mochtar =

Mochtar is a given name, often used by Indonesians. Notable people named Mochtar include:

- Ade Mochtar (born 1979), Indonesian footballer
- Fandy Mochtar (born 1984), Indonesian footballer
- Mochtar Apin (1923–1994), Indonesian painter
- Mochtar Lubis (1922–2004), Indonesian writer
- Mochtar Kusumaatmadja (1929–2021), Indonesian politician
- Mochtar Mohamad (born 1964), Indonesian politician
- Mochtar Riady (born 1929), Indonesian businessman
- Mohamad Mochtar (1918–1981), Indonesian actor
- Rd Mochtar (1918–????), Indonesian nobleman and actor
