= Fuquay =

Fuquay is an American surname, possibly an Americanization of the French surname Fouquet.

Fuquay may refer to the following places in the United States:

- Fuquay, West Virginia, an unincorporated community in Kanawha County
- Fuquay-Varina, North Carolina, a town in Wake County
- Fuquay Springs, North Carolina, a former town that is now part of Fuquay-Varina, North Carolina

== See also ==
- Fuqua (disambiguation)
