= Borsalino (disambiguation) =

Borsalino may refer to:

- Borsalino, Italian fashion company
- Borsalino (film), 1970 French gangster film
- Borsalino (One Piece), fictional character
- Borsalino & Co., 1974 French gangster film
