= Borsalino =

Italian hat company

Borsalino Giuseppe e Fratello S.p.A.

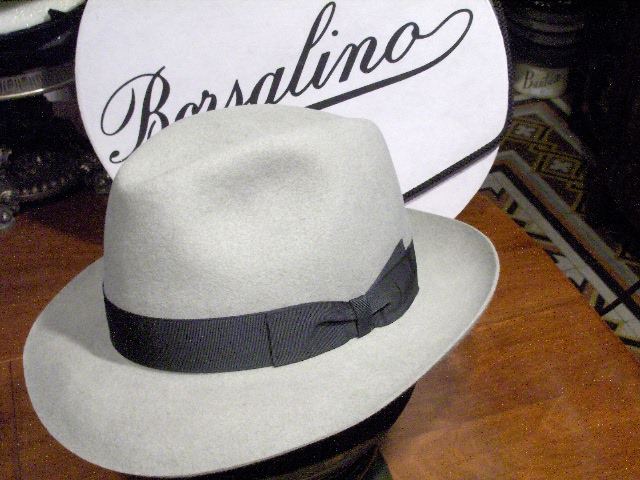
- Company type: Private subsidiary
- Industry: Fashion
- Founded: April 4, 1857; 168 years ago in Alessandria, Piedmont-Sardinia
- Founder: Giuseppe Borsalino
- Headquarters: Spinetta Marengo, Italy
- Products: Fedoras
- Parent: Haeres Equita
- Website: borsalino.com

Borsalino Giuseppe e Fratello S.p.A. is the oldest Italian company specializing in the manufacture of luxury hats. Since 1857, the manufacturer has been based in Alessandria, Piedmont. The founder, Giuseppe Borsalino, is remembered for creating a particular model of felt hat characterized by the registered trademark Borsalino.

== History ==
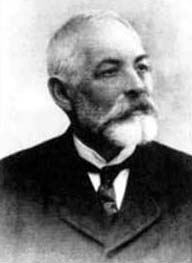
Giuseppe Borsalino (1834–1900), the founder of Borsalino

On 4 April 1857, Giuseppe Borsalino started a workshop in Alessandria that specialized in the production of felt hats. The workshop eventually grew to industrial production, and in 1888 the company moved to a new factory designed by Arnaldo Gardella, located on Corso Cento Cannoni, Alessandria. In these years Borsalino produced 2,500 hats a day, but when the company won the Grand Prix, an important quality certificate, at the Paris Exposition Universelle in 1900, it spread the brand's fame globally. The succession of Giuseppe Borsalino was complicated: the designated heir, Teresio Borsalino, was opposed to his cousin Giovanni Borsalino, son of Lazzaro, who inaugurated a new hat factory using the family name. Between Borsalino Antica Casa and Borsalino Fu Lazzaro were years of hard commercial battles, but in the end, the Teresio came out and the name Borsalino became one again.

On the eve of the First World War, Borsalino produced about 2,000,000 hats annually. The manufacturer employed over 2,500 employees, representing a significant resource in the economy of the Piedmontese city. Abroad, the brand spread everywhere, conquering the most important markets: the British, but especially the U.S., where the hats produced in Alessandria were adopted by the Hollywood star system.

A downsizing of the company occurred in 1950 in conjunction with the beginning of the fall into disuse of formal hats: Borsalino was thus transformed from a mass product into a cult object. In 1987 the hat factory moved from the historic center in Alessandria to the current one of Spinetta Marengo, in the suburbs of the city, and the president, Vittorio Vaccarino, the last descendant of the Borsalino family, sold the company to a group of Milanese entrepreneurs.

In the 1990s, the company changed ownership several times, ultimately being bought by the entrepreneur Marco Marenco, involved in a €3.5 billion financial crack. On 18 December 2017, the Court of Alessandria declared the bankruptcy of Borsalino Giuseppe and Fratello Spa. Haeres Equita, a private equity fund which managed the brand's activities since 2016, confirmed the will to continue the production, distribution and promoting activities of the forthcoming collections, keeping all employment and maintaining the production site in Alessandria. In 2017, on the occasion of the 160th anniversary of the company, the Italian Ministry of Economic Development recognized Borsalino as one of the 'Excellencies of the production system', dedicating it a stamp worth €0.95. On 12 July 2018, the company was sold in a court auction for €6.4 million (US$7.4 million) to Haeres Equita.

== Production ==
Borsalino manufacturing has remained faithful to a production process that represents the cultural values of the company, handed down from generation to generation. The hats continue to be produced in Alessandria close to the area of the company's original foundation. The felt models, created from fur fibers, require more than 50 manual steps and seven weeks of work to create; the straw models, which are hand twisted, can take up to 6 months for a single hat.

== Borsalino and Alessandria ==
The Borsalino business dynasty has made an important contribution to the city of Alessandria, building the aqueduct, the sewerage network, the hospital, the sanatorium and the retirement home. The historic headquarters of the company, currently located in Corso 100 Cannoni, now hosts the University of Eastern Piedmont Amedeo Avogadro and the Borsalino Hat Museum. In 2016, independent film director Enrica Viola dedicated a documentary to the relationship between Borsalino and Alessandria: Borsalino City was presented at film festivals in Turin, Barcelona, and Melbourne.

=== The Borsalino Hat Museum ===
In the spring of 2006, the Borsalino Hat Museum opened in the company's historical headquarters in Corso 100 Cannoni, Alessandria. A joint initiative by Alessandria town council and the Borsalino company, the museum covers an exhibition area of roughly 400 square metres (4,300 sq ft) and houses about two thousand hats, displayed in the historic Chippendale style cabinets made in the 1920s by Arnaldo Gardella for the factory sample room. In 2018, the museum planned to move to a larger venue with a completely renovated exhibition.

== In Orthodox Jewish communities ==
Among Orthodox Jewish men and boys, covering the head is an identifier of religiousity. Many men in strictly Orthodox Jewish communities wear a black, wide-brimmed hat, with Borsalino being one of the most popular makers.

== In popular culture ==
=== Borsalino and art ===
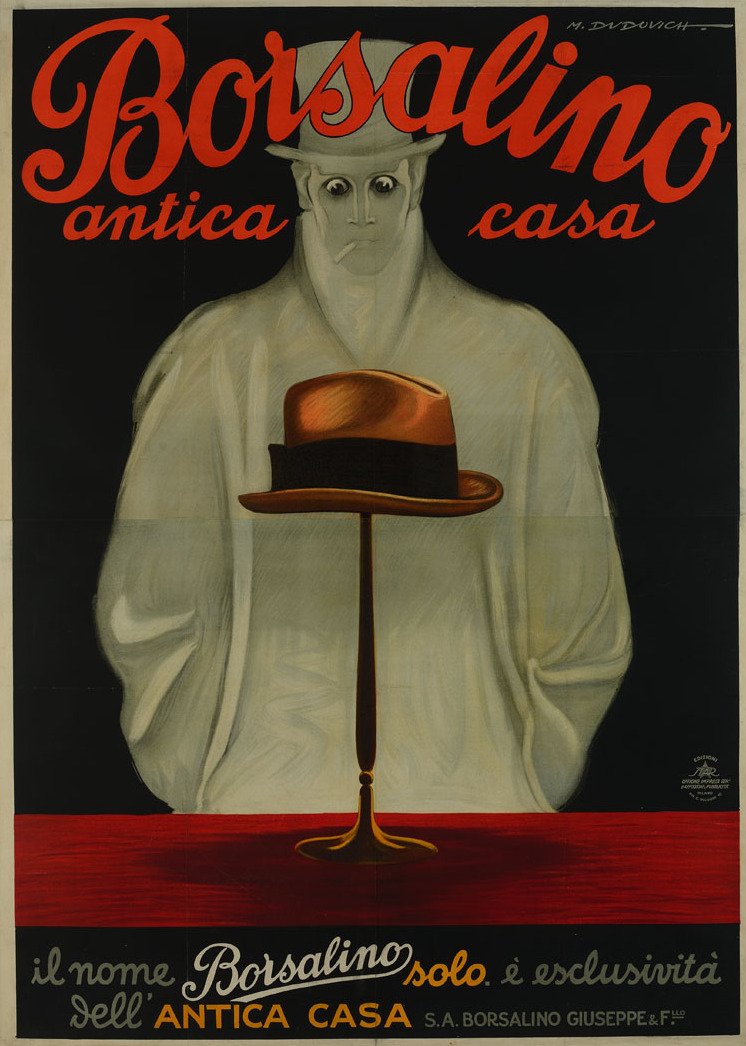
Advertising poster for Borsalino by Marcello Dudovich, 1928.

The relationship between Borsalino and the art world has ancient origins. Since the birth of advertising in Italy, at the turn of the late nineteenth and early twentieth century, Borsalino has entrusted the realization of its posters to the most important artists of the time. This privileged relationship with art has been confirmed over time and has led the company to collaborate with Cesare Simonetti, Giorgio Muggiani, Giovanni Dradi, Franz Laskoff, Marcello Dudovich, winner in 1910 of a competition organized by Borsalino to publicize the Zenit hat, Giuseppe Minonzio, Gino Boccasile, Luigi Bompard, Jeanne Grignani, Luigi Veronesi, Max Huber and Armando Testa. Today, the antique Borsalino advertising posters are collector items.

=== Borsalino and theatre ===
In Arthur Miller's play The Price, character Solomon mentions regretting that his hat is not a Borsalino, in spite of looking so.

=== Borsalino and cinema and television ===
Borsalino has a long-running and special bond with the film industry. Humphrey Bogart and Ingrid Bergman in the final scene of Casablanca tends to stand out as the most popular in which a Borsalino hat makes an appearance. The relationship with the cinema was destined to last: in addition to Bogart and Bergman in Casablanca, Marcello Mastroianni in 8 ½ and Jean Paul Belmondo in Breathless both wore a Borsalino.

The Alessandria factory granted the use of its name to two cult films of the 1970s: Borsalino and Borsalino & Co.. The idea was Alain Delon's, and Borsalino accepted on the condition that the company logo would appear on the posters. The Italian company was the first luxury brand to give its name to two films.

Robert De Niro in Once Upon a Time in America (1984) wore Borsalino hats.

In the 2010 TV series The Trip to Italy, in episode 6, located in Capri, Steve Coogan says that he is wearing a Borsalino hat, and Al Capone "used to wear one of these".

In 2011, the Triennale Design Museum in Milan hosted an exhibition entitled "Il cinema con il cappello. Borsalino e altre storie".

The actor Toni Servillo wears a Borsalino in the film The Great Beauty, which won Best Foreign Language Film at the 86th Academy Awards.

In 2018, Borsalino celebrated its deep and lasting relationship with the world of cinema by introducing The Bogart by Borsalino, a special collection dedicated to Humphrey Bogart, the great Hollywood actor. The hats collection was created in collaboration with Humphrey Bogart Estate.

In the TV show "Shantaram", a secondary but recurring character in season 1, episode 5, titled "The Sin in the Crime", uses a metaphor about the quality of a Borsalino hat to describe the main character's (Lin Ford, played by Charlie Hunnam) relationship with the city of Bombay, India.

In the Netflix series "Ripley", a witness to the disposal of Freddie's body described him as a thin man wearing a Borsalino hat. In the TV series The Blacklist Season 10 episode 11 (The Man With the Hat) the main character Raymond Reddington played by James Spader is shown to wear a Borsolino hat.

=== Borsalino and design ===
In 2009, Borsalino was included by the Triennale Design Museum in Milan among quintessential Italian icons in the 'Serie Fuori Serie' exhibition. The exhibition was replicated in March 2017 at the National Museum of China in Beijing.

The Chapeau Lamp (2014) designed by Philippe Starck for Flos and the sculpture The Hatband(2016) by Moritz Waldemeyer are both tributes to Borsalino.

=== Borsalino and fashion ===
Borsalino has been collaborating with important names in the fashion system since the beginning of the millennium. These have led to the creation of capsule collections with Nick Fouquet, Tom Ford, Versace, Krizia, Valentino, Moschino, Yohji Yamamoto, Marni, Gianfranco Ferré, Rochas, Italia Independent, and DSquared.

== See also ==
- Fedora
- Boss of the Plains
- Homburg (hat)
- Pork pie hat
- Stetson
- Trench coat
- Trilby
- Tyrolean hat
- List of headgear
- Cap
