= Nubian Skin =

English lingerie brand

- Industry: Clothing
- Founded: October 2014
- Founder: Ade Hassan
- Headquarters: London
- Products: Lingerie
- Website: nubianskin.com

Nubian Skin is a London-based English lingerie and hosiery brand launched in 2014 by Ade Hassan, specializing in "nude" undergarments for women of colour.

== History ==
Nubian Skin was established in October 2014 by Ade Hassan, who began working on the idea in 2011, when she became frustrated with not being able to find hosiery in her own "nude" tone.

The brand officially launched at the Lingerie Edit, in December 2014. It became well known after going from 10 to 20,000 followers on Instagram in its first few weeks, following a tweet by actress Kerry Washington. The brand has received interest from other notable women of colour, including Beverley Knight, Thandiwe Newton, and Beyoncé, who included Nubian Skin in the Formation World Tour. In May 2015, Nubian Skin announced they were extending their range to include up to 40" backs and A cups. Additionally, towards the beginning of January 2016, the company launched the Curve Collection, targeted at plus-sized women. In 2016, Nubian Skin launched an Africa collection called "Moroccan Nights", a limited-edition, luxury lingerie and sleepwear line "inspired by and made in Africa".

Nubian Skin is sold at retailers such as Fenwick, ASOS.com, House of Fraser, and Nordstrom.

The brand also supports the CoppaFeel! "Bra Hijack" campaign.

== Awards ==
In September 2015, Ade Hassan received the Fashion Entrepreneur of the Year Award at the Great British Entrepreneur Awards. In October 2015, Nubian Skin was nominated for Hosiery Brand of the Year at the UK Lingerie Awards, and won UK's Favourite British Designer of the Year.
