= Anthony E. Siegman =

American engineer & educator (1931–2011)

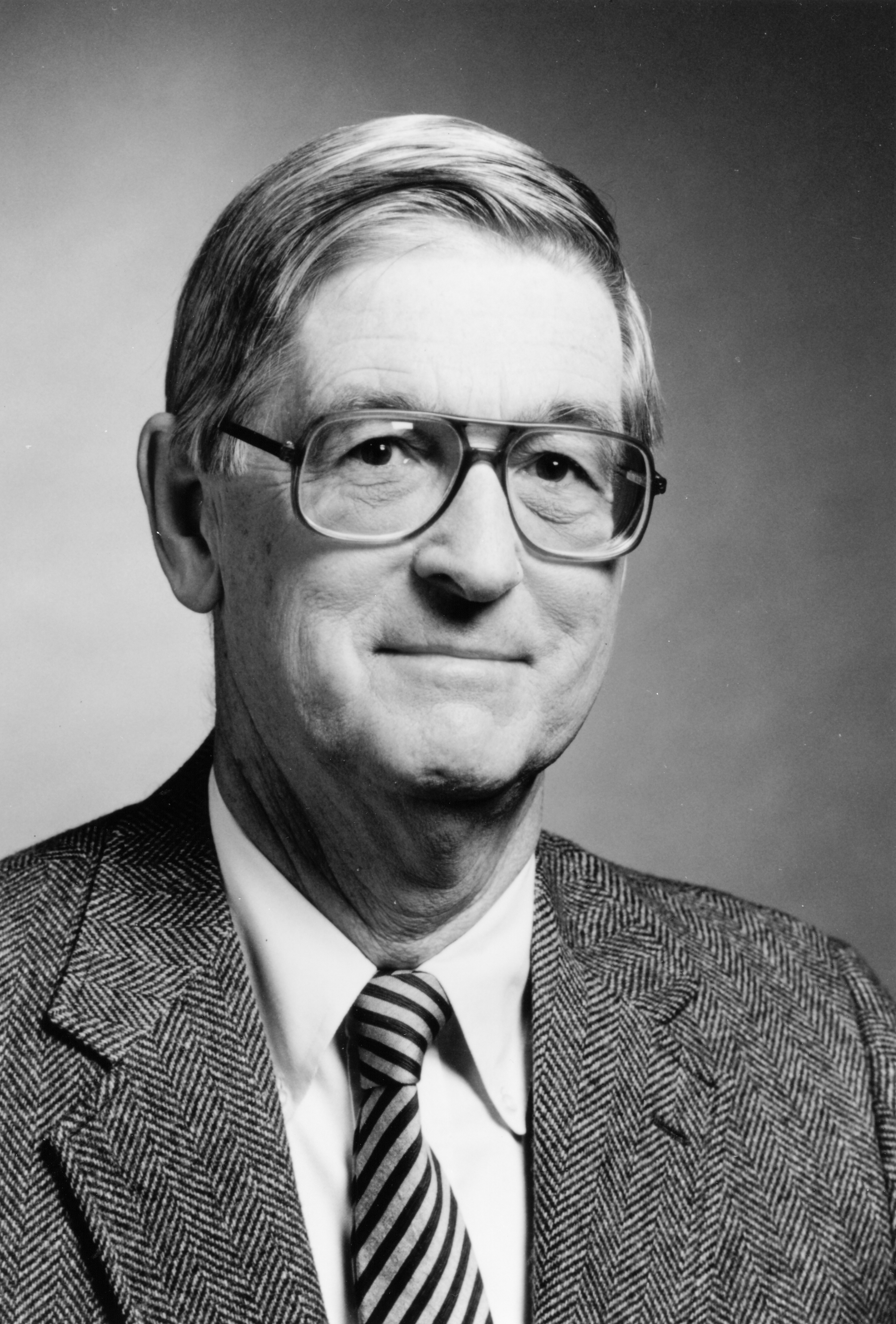
- Born: November 23, 1931; Detroit, Michigan, U.S.
- Died: October 7, 2011 (aged 79); Stanford, California, U.S.
- Known for: Lasers, Optics, Unstable resonators
- Awards: Frederic Ives Medal (1987); J J Ebers Award (1977)
- Scientific career
- Fields: Electrical engineering Applied physics
- Workplaces: Stanford University
- Doctoral students: Julie Fouquet

Anthony E. Siegman (November 23, 1931 – October 7, 2011) was an electrical engineer and educator at Stanford University who investigated and taught about masers and lasers. Known to almost all as Tony Siegman, he was president of the Optical Society of America [now Optica (society)] in 1999 and was awarded the R. W. Wood Prize in 1980, the Frederic Ives Medal in 1987, and the Esther Hoffman Beller Medal in 2009.

== Personal ==
Siegman was born on November 23, 1931, in Detroit and raised in rural Michigan. He graduated from Catholic Central High School in Detroit in 1949. He died at his home, in Stanford, on October 7, 2011. He was married (to wife Virginia) had three children, one stepdaughter, and two grandchildren.

=== Education ===
A.B. degree summa cum laude from Harvard College in 1952, the M.S. in applied physics from the University of California at Los Angeles in 1954 under the Hughes Aircraft Company Cooperative Plan, and the Ph.D. in electrical engineering from Stanford University in 1957.

=== Career ===
He was appointed to the Stanford faculty on an acting basis in 1956 and became an assistant professor in 1957 after receiving the PhD in Electrical Engineering with a dissertation topic on microwave noise in electron beams. Shortly thereafter he switched to work on microwave masers and parametric devices, which after 1960 evolved into a research and teaching career in lasers and optics. He was promoted to full professor at Stanford in 1964, and retired from his Stanford position as the Burton J. and Ann M. McMurtry Professor of Engineering in November 1998.

During his Stanford career he supervised some 40 PhD dissertations, published numerous scientific articles, and three textbooks: Microwave Solid-State Masers (McGraw-Hill, 1964), An Introduction to Lasers and Masers (McGraw-Hill, 1972), and Lasers (University Science Books, 1986). He was also director of the Ginzton Laboratory from 1978 to 1983 and again in 1998–99, and served on numerous academic committees and as a member of the Stanford Faculty senate and its steering committee.

He also spent sabbatical periods as visiting professor of applied physics at Harvard in 1965, as a Guggenheim Fellow at IBM Research - Zurich in 1969–70, and as an Alexander von Humboldt Senior Scientist at the Max Planck Institute for Quantum Optics in Garching, Germany, in 1984–85.

Early in his career he was Program Chair for the 1996 International Quantum Electronics Conference and Conference Chair for the 1968 IQEC, and he later served as co-director of Laser Schools in Korea and Taiwan. He was a member of the United States Air Force Scientific Advisory Board during 1974–80 and served on advisory groups for NBS, NIST, NSF and other government agencies. He received the J J Ebers Award in 1977 from the IEEE and was elected to the National Academy of Engineering in 1973 and the National Academy of Sciences in 1988. He was elected a Fellow of OSA in 1968. In 1996 he was elected as vice-president of the Optical Society of America and served as President of the OSA during 1999.

Siegman's most notable contribution was in the area of unstable resonators; his book Lasers (1986) became a standard reference in the field.

Professionally, A. E. Siegman was known as Tony Siegman.

== Donation to his Hometown Waterford, MI Library ==
In June 1990, Siegman donated a copy of his book Lasers (1986) to his hometown library back in Waterford, Michigan. He included the following note on the inside title page:

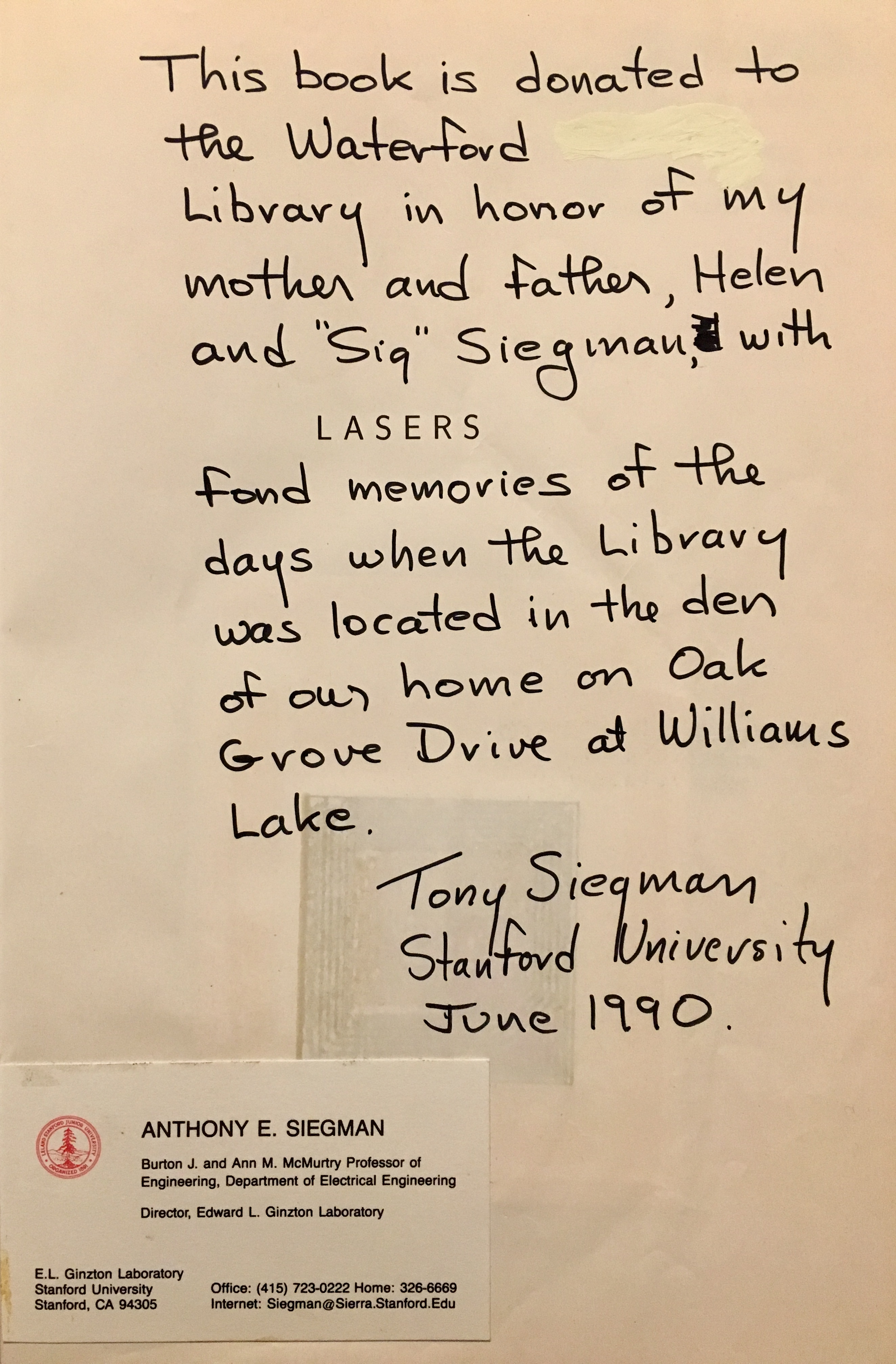
Title Page of Donated copy of LASERS book

== Publications ==
=== Books ===
- Microwave Solid-State Masers, A. E. Siegman (McGraw-Hill, 1964).
- An Introduction to Lasers and Masers, A. E. Siegman (McGraw-Hill, 1971).
- Lasers, A. E. Siegman (University Science Books, 1986).
- Lasers and Their Applications, I. P. Kaminow and A. E. Siegman (eds.) (IEEE Press, Selected Reprint Series, 1973).

=== Book chapters ===
- A. E. Siegman, "Interaction of Radiation with Matter," in Lasers and Their Applications (Gordon and Breach, 1976).
- A. E. Siegman, "Quantum Electronics," in McGraw-Hill Encyclopedia of Science and Technology, 5th Edition (McGraw-Hill Book Company, 1980).
- A. E. Siegman, "Laser Beams and Resonators," in Proceedings of Scottish Universities Summer School in Physics (Heriot-Watt University, August 1982).
- A. E. Siegman, P. A. Belanger and A. Hardy, "Optical Resonators Using Phase-Conjugate Mirrors," in Optical Phase Conjugation (Academic Press, 1983).
- A. E. Siegman, "The Laser---Still Young After Twenty Five Years?," in Lasers: Invention to Application (National Academy Press, 1987).
- A. E. Siegman, "Advances in Laser Resonator Design Using Variable Reflectivity Mirrors," in Tutorials in Optics (Optical Society of America, 1992).
- A. E. Siegman, "Defining and Measuring Laser Beam Quality," in Solid State Lasers: New Developments and Applications (Plenum Press, 1994).

=== Journal articles ===
- Watkins, D. A.; Siegman, A. E. (1953). "Helix Impedance Measurements Using an Electron Beam". Journal of Applied Physics. 24 (7). AIP Publishing: 917–922. Bibcode:1953JAP....24..917W. doi:10.1063/1.1721402. ISSN 0021-8979.
- Siegman, A.E.; Johnson, H.R. (1955). "Suppression of backward–wave oscillation by filter helix methods". IRE Transactions on Electron Devices. 2 (2). Institute of Electrical and Electronics Engineers (IEEE): 20–31. Bibcode:1955ITED....2...20S. doi:10.1109/t-ed.1955.14068. ISSN 0096-2430. S2CID 51672370.
- Johnson, H.R.; Everhart, T.E.; Siegman, A.E. (1956). "Wave propagation on multifilar helices". IRE Transactions on Electron Devices. 3 (1). Institute of Electrical and Electronics Engineers (IEEE): 18–24. Bibcode:1956ITED....3...18J. doi:10.1109/t-ed.1956.14094. ISSN 0096-2430. S2CID 51665240.
- Siegman, A. E. (1957). "Correspondence: Gain-bandwidth and noise in maser amplifiers". Proceedings of the IRE. 45 (12). Institute of Electrical and Electronics Engineers (IEEE): 1737. doi:10.1109/jrproc.1957.278330. ISSN 0096-8390.
- Siegman, A.E.; Watkins, D.A. (1957). "Potential-minimum noise in the microwave diode". IRE Transactions on Electron Devices. 4 (1). Institute of Electrical and Electronics Engineers (IEEE): 82–86. Bibcode:1957ITED....4...82S. doi:10.1109/t-ed.1957.14205. ISSN 0096-2430. S2CID 51643444.
- Siegman, A. E.; Watkins, D. A.; Hsieh, Hsung-Cheng (1957). "Density-Function Calculations of Noise Propagation on an Accelerated Multivelocity Electron Beam". Journal of Applied Physics. 28 (10). AIP Publishing: 1138–1148. Bibcode:1957JAP....28.1138S. doi:10.1063/1.1722594. ISSN 0021-8979.
- Siegman, A.E.; Bloom, S. (1957). "An equivalent circuit for microwave noise at the potential minimum". IRE Transactions on Electron Devices. 4 (4). Institute of Electrical and Electronics Engineers (IEEE): 295–299. Bibcode:1957ITED....4..295S. doi:10.1109/t-ed.1957.14310. ISSN 0096-2430. S2CID 51640798.
- Siegman, A. E. (1957). "Analysis of Multivelocity Electron Beams by the Density-Function Method". Journal of Applied Physics. 28 (10). AIP Publishing: 1132–1138. Bibcode:1957JAP....28.1132S. doi:10.1063/1.1722593. ISSN 0021-8979.
- Siegman, A.E.; Butcher, P.N.; Cromack, J.C.; Chang, W.S.C. (1958). "Travelling-wave solid-state masers". Proceedings of the IEE - Part B: Radio and Electronic Engineering. 105 (11S). Institution of Engineering and Technology (IET): 711–712. doi:10.1049/pi-b-1.1958.0159. ISSN 2054-0434.
- W. S. C. Chang and A. E. Siegman, "Characteristics of ruby for maser applications," Rev. Mod. Phys. 31, 681 (1959).
- A. E. Siegman and R. J. Morris, "Proposal for a staircase maser," Phys. Rev. Lett. 2, 302 (April 1959).
- A. W. Shaw, A. E. Siegman and D. A. Watkins, "Reduction of electron beam noisiness by means of a low-potential drift region," Proc. IRE 47, 334 (February 1959).
- A. E. Siegman, "Phase-distortionless limiting by a parametric method," Proc. IRE 47, 447 (March 1959).
- A. E. Siegman, "The waves on a filamentary electron beam in a transverse-field slow-wave circuit," J. Appl. Phys. 31, 17 (January 1960).
- A. E. Siegman, "Entropy and cross-relaxation in spin systems," Phys. Rev. 119, 562 (July 1960).
- A. E. Siegman, "Progress in solid-state masers," J. Res. National Bureau of Standards 64D, 758—763 (November–December 1960).
- A. E. Siegman, "The DC pumped quadrupole amplifiera wave analysis," Proc. IRE 48, 1750–1755 (October 1960).
- W. H. Louisell, A. Yariv and A. E. Siegman, "Quantum fluctuations and noise in parametric processes," Phys. Rev. 124, 1646 (December 1961).
- A. E. Siegman, "Zero-point energy as the source of amplifier noise," Proc. IRE 49, 633—634 (March 1961).
- A. E. Siegman, "Thermal noise in microwave systems. I. Fundamentals. III. Noise in high-frequency amplifiers, particularly masers. III. Practical problems and ultimate limits of amplifier noise figures," The Microwave Journal 4, 81 (March–April–May 1961).
- I. T. Ho and A. E. Siegman, "Passive phase-distortionless parametric limiting with varactor diodes," IRE Trans. Microwave Theory and Techniques MTT—9, 459 (November 1961).
- H. Inaba and A. E. Siegman, "Microwave photomixing of optical maser outputs with a PIN-junction photodiode," Proc. IRE 50, 1823 (August 1962).
- S. E. Harris and A. E. Siegman, "A proposed FM phototube for demodulating microwave- frequency-modulated Light signals," IRE Trans. Elec. Devices ED-9, 322 (July 1962).
- A. E. Siegman, "Nonlinear optical effects: an optical power limiter," Appl. Opt. 1, 739 (November 1962).
- S. E. Harris, B. J. McMurtry and A. E. Siegman, "Modulation and direct demodulation of coherent and incoherent light at a microwave frequency," Appl. Phys. Lett. 1, 37 (October 1962).
- S. Mao and A. E. Siegman, "Cyclotron wave amplification using simultaneous RF coupling and DC pumping," Proceedings of the 4th International Congress on Microwave Tubes, Eindhoven: Centrex Publishing Co., (1963).
- A. E. Siegman, "Small-mirror transverse-mode control and near-field rings in ruby-laser rods," J. Opt. Soc. Am. 54, 567 (April 1964).
- A. E. Siegman, "Design considerations for laser pulse amplifiers," J. Appl. Phys. 35, 460 (February 1964).
- A. E. Siegman and B. J. McMurtry, "Lossless beam combination for optical heterodyning," Proc. IEEE 52, 94 (January 1964).
- A. E. Siegman, C. F. Quate, J. Bjorkholm, and G. Francois, "Frequency translation of an He-Ne lasers output frequency by acoustic output coupling inside the resonant cavity," Appl. Phys. Lett. 5, 1 (July 1964).
- S. E. Harris and A. E. Siegman, "A technique for optical frequency translation utilizing the quadratic electro-optic effect in cubic crystals," Appl. Opt. 3, 1089 (September 1964).
- P. Wysocki, A. Kostenbauder, B. Y. Kim and A. E. Siegman, "Bipolar optical modulation and demodulation using a dual-mode fiber and a fast diffusion-driven photodetector," IEEE J. Lightwave Technol. LT-7, 1964 (December 1989).
- A. E. Siegman and J. W. Allen, "Pump power dependence of ruby laser starting and stopping time," IEEE J. Quantum Electron. QE-1, 386 (December 1965).
- A. E. Siegman and V. Evtuhov, "Twisted-mode technique for obtaining axially uniform energy density in a laser cavity," Appl. Opt., 4, 142 4, 142 (January 1965).
- G. Francois and A. E. Siegman, "The effect of gaussian beam spread on phase-velocity matching in CW optical second-harmonic generation," Phys. Rev. A4, 139 (July 1965).
- A. E. Siegman, "Unstable optical resonators for laser applications," Proc. IEEE 53, 277 (March 1965).
- A. E. Siegman, "Progress in Quantum Electronics: Report of Commission 7 to XV Congress of URSI," Radio Science 1, 1379 (December 1966).
- A. E. Siegman, "Obtaining the equations of motion for parametrically coupled oscillators or waves," Proc. IEEE 54, 576 (May 1966).
- A. E. Siegman, B. Daino and K. R. Manes, "Preliminary measurements of laser short-term frequency fluctuations," IEEE J. Quantum Electron. QE—3, 180—189 (May 1967).
- A. E. Siegman, "The antenna properties of optical heterodyne receivers," Appl. Opt. 5, 1588 (October 1966).
- A. E. Siegman, "The antenna properties of optical heterodyne receivers," Proc. IEEE 54, 1350 (October 1966).
- A. E. Siegman and R. Arrathoon, "Modes in unstable optical resonators and lens waveguides," IEEE J. Quantum Electron. QE—3, 156—163 (April 1967).
- J. E. Bjorkholm and A. E. Siegman, "Accurate CW measurements of optical second-harmonic generation in ADP and calcite," Phys. Rev. 154, 851—860 (February 1967).
- A. E. Siegman, "A maximum signal theorem for the spatially coherent detection of scattered radiation," IEEE Trans. Antennas and Propagation AP—15, 192 (January 1967).
- A. E. Siegman, "Absolute frequency stabilization of a laser oscillator against a laser amplifier," IEEE J. Quantum Electron. QE—3, 377 (July 1967).
- A. E. Siegman, B. Daino and K. R. Manes, "Preliminary measurements of laser short-term frequency fluctuations," IEEE J. Quantum Electron. QE-3, 180 (May 1967).
- A. E. Siegman and R. Arrathoon, "Observation of quantum phase noise in a laser oscillator," Phys. Rev. Lett. 20, 901—902 (22 April 1968).
- D. G. Carlson and A. E. Siegman, "Intracavity electro-optic frequency tuning, polarization switching, and Q-switching of a Nd:YAG laser oscillator," IEEE J. Quantum Electron. QE-4, 93 (March 1968).
- R. Arrathoon and A. E. Siegman, "Current pushing of the oscillation frequency of a 6328 He-Ne laser," Appl. Phys. Lett. 13, 197 (September 1968).
- A. E. Siegman, "Comments on pumping on a swing," Am. J. Phys. 37, 843 (August 1969).
- R. Arrathoon and A. E. Siegman, "Further measurements of quantum phase noise in a He-Ne laser," J. Appl. Phys. 40, 910—911 (February 1969).
- G. A. Massey, R. Tremblay and A. E. Siegman, "A Fresnel-drag ring-laser method for rotation readout of a spinning transparent spherical gyroscope," IEEE J. Quantum El ectron. QE-5, 357 (June 1969).
- A. E. Siegman and D. J. Kuizenga, "Simple analytic expressions for AM and FM mode-locked pulses in homogeneous lasers," Appl. Phys. Lett. 14, 181 (March 1969).
- G. A. Massey and A. E. Siegman, "Reflection and refraction of gaussian light beams at tilted ellipsoidal surfaces," Appl. Opt. 8, 975—978 (May 1969).
- A. E. Siegman and D. J. Kuizenga, "A proposed method for measuring picosecond pulse widths and pulse shapes in cw mode-locked lasers," IEEE J. Quantum Electron. QE-6, 212 (April 1970).
- S. C. Wang, R. L. Byer and A. E. Siegman, "Observation of an enhanced Lamb dip with a pure Xe gain cell inside a 3.51 He-Xe laser," Appl. Phys. Lett. 17, 120 (August 1970).
- G. A. Massey and A. E. Siegman, "Fresnel drag technique for determining the spin-Axis orientation of a spherical rotor," IEEE J. Quantum Electron. QE-6, 500 (August 1970).
- A. E. Siegman and H. Y. Miller, "Unstable optical resonator loss calculations using the Prony method," Appl. Opt. 9, 2729–2763 (December 1970).
- A. E. Siegman and D. J. Kuizenga, "Modulator frequency detuning effects in the FM-mode-locked laser," IEEE J. Quantum Electron. QE-6, 803 (December 1970).
- D. J. Kuizenga and A. E. Siegman, "FM and AM mode-locking of the homogeneous laser. II. Experimental results in a Nd:YAG laser with internal FM modulation," IEEE J. Quantum Electron. QE-6, 709 (November 1970).
- A. E. Siegman and D. J. Kuizenga, "FM-laser operation of the Nd:YAG laser," IEEE J. Quantum Electron. QE-6, 673 (November 1970).
- D. J. Kuizenga and A. E. Siegman, "FM and AM mode-locking of the Homogeneous Laser. I. Theory," IEEE J. Quantum Electron. QE-6, 694 (November 1970).
- S. C. Wang and A. E. Siegman, "Absorption coefficient, transition probability, and collision-broadening frequency of dimethylether at He-Xe laser 3.51 wavelength," IEEE J. Quantum Electron. QE-6, 576 (September 1970).
- A. E. Siegman, "Laser Book List," Appl. Opt. A 10, 36 (December 1971).
- K. R. Manes and A. E. Siegman, "Observation of quantum phase fluctuations in infrared gas lasers," Phys. Rev. A 4, 373—386 (July 1971).
- A. E. Siegman, "A course in lasers and optical electronics for engineers, or quantum electronics without quantum mechanics," IEEE Trans. Education E--14, 162 (May 1971).
- A. E. Siegman, "Stabilizing output with unstable resonators," Laser Focus 7, 42 (May 1971).
- M. F. Becker, D. J. Kuizenga and A. E. Siegman, "Harmonic mode locking of the Nd:YAG laser," IEEE Quantum Electron. QE-8, 687 (August 1972).
- A. E. Siegman, "Dispersive explanation of the spectral behavior of Runges mode-locked dye laser," Opt. Commun. 5, 200 (July 1972).
- A. E. Siegman, D. W. Phillion, and D. J. Kuizenga, "Rotational relaxation and triplet state effects in the cw dye laser," Appl. Phys. Lett. 21, 345 (October 1972).
- A. E. Siegman, "An antiresonant ring interferometer for coupled laser cavities, laser output coupling, mode locking, and cavity dumping," IEEE J. Quantum Electron. QE-9, 247—250 (February 1973).
- D. J. Kuizenga, D. W. Phillion, T. Lund and A. E. Siegman, "Simultaneous Q-switching and mode-locking in the CW Nd:YAG laser," Opt. Commun. 9, 221 (November 1973).
- A. E. Siegman, "Hermite-gaussian functions of complex argument as optical beam eigenfunctions,," J. Opt. Soc. Am. 63, 1093 (September 1973).
- S. C. Wang and A. E. Siegman, "Hollow-cathode transverse discharge He-Ne and Ne-Cd+ lasers," Appl. Phys. 2, 143 (September 1973).
- D. W. Phillion, D. J. Kuizenga and A. E. Siegman, "Rotational diffusion and triplet state processes in dye laser solutions," J. Chem. Phys. 61, 3828 (1 November 1974).
- A. E. Siegman, "Why the sinc function should be defined as (sin x)/x and not as (sin pi x)/(pi x)," Appl. Opt. 13, 705 (April 1974).
- E. A. Sziklas and A. E. Siegman, "Mode calculations in unstable resonators with flowing saturable gain. I. Hermite-gaussian expansion," Appl. Opt. 13, 2775–2792 (December 1974).
- A. E. Siegman, "Unstable optical resonators (review article)," Appl. Optics 13, 353-367, (February 1974).
- A. E. Siegman and D. J. Kuizenga, "Active mode-coupling phenomena in pulsed and continuous lasers (review article)," Opto-Electronics 6, 43 (January 1974).
- E. A. Sziklas and A. E. Siegman, "Diffraction calculations using fast Fourier transform methods,," Proc. IEEE 62, 410 (March 1974).
- M. F. Becker, D. J. Kuizenga, D. W. Phillion and A. E. Siegman, "Analytic expression for ultrashort pulse generation in mode-locked optical parametric oscillators," J. Appl. Phys. 45, 3996 (September 1974).
- E. A. Sziklas and A. E. Siegman, "Mode calculations in unstable resonator with flowing saturable gain. II. Fast Fourier transform method," Appl. Opt. 14, 1873–1889 (August 1975).
- D. W. Phillion, D. J. Kuizenga and A. E. Siegman, "Subnanosecond relaxation time measurements using a transient induced grating method," Appl. Phys. Lett. 27, 85 (July 1975).
- A. E. Siegman, "How to compute two complex even Fourier transforms with one transform step," Proc. IEEE 63, 544 (March 1975).
- A. E. Siegman, "A canonical formulation for multi-element unstable resonator calculations," IEEE J. Quantum Electron. QE—12, 35 (January 1976).
- S.-C. Sheng and A. E. Siegman, "Perturbed gaussian modes of an unbalanced antiresonant-ring laser cavity," J. Opt. Soc. Am. 66, 1032–1036 (October 1976).
- A. E. Siegman, "Proposed measurement of subpicosecond excited-state dynamics using a tunable-laser-induced-grating," Appl. Phys. Lett. 30, 21—23 (1 January 1977).
- A. E. Siegman, "Bragg diffraction of a gaussian beam by a crossed-gaussian volume grating," J. Opt. Soc. Am. 67, 545—550 (April).
- R. Trutna and A. E. Siegman, "Laser cavity dumping using an antiresonant ring," IEEE J. Quantum Electron. QE—13, 955—962 (December 1977).
- A. E. Siegman, "Quasi fast Hankel transform," Opt. Lett. 1, 13-15 (March 1977).
- A. E. Siegman, "Effects of small-scale phase perturbations on laser oscillator beam quality," IEEE J. Quantum Electron. QE—13, 334—337 (May 1977).
- J. R. Salcedo, A. E. Siegman, D. D. Dlott and M. D. Fayer, "Dynamics of energy transport in molecular crystals: the picosecond transient grating method," Phys. Rev. Lett. 41, 131—134 (10 July 1978).
- A. J. Duerinckx, H. Vanherzeele, J.-L. V. Eck and A. E. Siegman, "Pulse compression inside an actively AM mode-locked Nd:YAG laser using a liquid Kerr cell," IEEE J. Quantum Electron. QE-14, 983—992 (December 1978).
- N. Holmes and A. E. Siegman, "The optically pumped mercury vapor laser," J. Appl. Phys. 49, 3155—3170 (June 1978).
- A. E. Siegman, "Historical note on spatial hole burning and twisted-mode laser resonators," Optics Commun. 24, 365 (March 1978).
- J. R. Salcedo and A. E. Siegman, "Laser induced photoacoustic grating effects in molecular crystals," IEEE J. Quantum Electron. QE-15, 250—256 (April 1979).
- A. E. Siegman, "Dynamic interferometry and differential holography of irregular phase objects using phase conjugate reflection," Optics Commun. 31, 257—258 (December 1979).
- A. E. Siegman, "Orthogonality properties of optical resonator eigenmodes," Opt. Commun. 31, 369—373 (December 1979).
- A. E. Siegman, "Simplified derivation of the Fokker-Planck equation," Am J. Phys. 47, 545—547 (June 1979).
- P. A. Belanger, A. Hardy and A. E. Siegman, "Resonant modes of optical cavities with phase-conjugate mirrors," Appl. Opt. 19, 602—609 (15 February 1980).
- P. A. Belanger, A. Hardy and A. E. Siegman, "Resonant modes of optical cavities with phase conjugate mirrors: higher-order modes," Appl. Opt. 19, 479—480 (15 February 1980).
- A. E. Siegman, "Exact cavity equations for lasers with large output coupling," Appl. Phys. Lett. 36, 412—414 (15 March 1980).
- S.-C. Sheng and A. E. Siegman, "Nonlinear optical calculations using fast transform methods: second harmonic generation with depletion and diffraction," Phys. Rev. A 21, 599—606 (February 1980).
- R. Trebino and A. E. Siegman, "Phase conjugate reflection at arbitrary angles using TEM00 pump beams," Optics Commun. 32, 1--4 (January 1980).
- A. E. Siegman and J.-M. Heritier, "Analysis of the mode-locked and intracavity frequency-doubled Nd:YAG laser," IEEE J. Quantum Electron. QE-16, 324—335 (March 1980).
- H. Vanherzeele, J. L. Van Eck and A. E. Siegman, "Colliding pulse mode locking of a Nd:YAG laser with an antiresonant ring structure," Appl. Opt. 20, 3484-3486 (15 October 1981).
- G. Hayward, W. Carlsen, A. E. Siegman and L. Stryer, "The retinal chromophore in rhodopsin photoisomerizes within picoseconds," Science 211, 942-944 (27 February 1981).
- A. E. Siegman, "Passive mode locking using an antiresonant-ring laser cavity," Opt. Lett. 6, 334-335 (July 1981).
- H. Vanherzeele, J. L. Van Eck and A. E. Siegman, "Mode-locked laser oscillation using self-pumped phase conjugate reflection," Opt. Lett. 6, 467-469 (October 1981).
- J.-M. Heritier, J. E. Fouquet and A. E. Siegman, "Photoacoustic cell using elliptical acoustic focusing," Appl. Opt. 21, 90-93 (1 January 1982).
- P. M. Fauchet and A. E. Siegman, "Surface ripples on silicon and gallium arsenide under picosecond laser illumination," Appl. Phys. Lett. 40, 824-826 (1 May 1982).
- A. Hardy, P. A. Belanger and A. E. Siegman, "Orthogonality properties of phase conjugate optical resonators," Appl. Opt. 21, 1122–1124 (15 March 1982).
- A. E. Siegman, "Developments in mode-locked lasers and their applications," Proc. SPIE 322, 60-67 (26 January 1982).
- R. Trebino, J. P. Roller and A. E. Siegman, "A comparison of the Cassegrain and other beam expanders in high-power pulsed dye lasers," IEEE J. Quantum Electron. QE-18, 1208–1213 (August 1982).
- G. Zhou, P. M. Fauchet and A. E. Siegman, "Growth of spontaneous periodic surface structures on solids during laser illumination," Phys. Rev. B 26, 5366–5381 (November 1982).
- P. M. Fauchet and A. E. Siegman, "Evidence for a dense electron-hole plasma close to the melting phase transition in silicon," Appl. Phys. Lett. 43, 1043–1045 (1 December 1983).
- R. Trebino and A. E. Siegman, "Subpicosecond relaxation study of malachite green using a three-laser frequency domain technique," J. Chem. Phys. 79, 3621-3626 (15 October 1983).
- P. M. Fauchet and A. E. Siegman, "Observations of higher-order laser-induced surface ripples on (111) germanium," Appl. Phys. A 32, 135-140 (1983).
- A. E. Siegman, "Additional formulas for stimulated atomic transitions," Am. J. Phys. 51, 1110–1113 (December 1983).
- J.-Q. Yao, G. Zhou and A. E. Siegman, "Large-signal results for degenerate four-wave mixing and phase conjugate resonators," Appl. Phys. 30, 11-18 (January 1983).
- J.-M. Heritier and A. E. Siegman, "Picosecond measurements using photoacoustic detection," IEEE J. Quantum Electron. QE-19, 1551–1558 (October 1983).
- J. E. Fouquet and A. E. Siegman, "Room temperature photoluminescence times in a GaAs/AlxGa1-xAs molecular beam epitaxy multiple quantum well structure," Appl. Phys. Lett. 46, 280-282 (1 February 1985).
- J. E. Fouquet, A. E. Siegman, R. D. Burnham and T. L. Paoli, "Carrier trapping in room temperature time-resolved photoluminescence of a GaAs/AlxGa1-xAs multiple quantum well structure grown by metalorganic chemical vapor deposition," Appl. Phys. Lett. 46, 374-376 (15 February 1985).
- A. E. Siegman, "ABCD matrix elements for a curved diffraction grating," J. Opt. Soc. Am. A 2, 1793 (October 1985).
- R. Trebino, C. E. Barker and A. E. Siegman, "Tunable-laser-induced gratings for the measurement of ultrafast phenomena (invited paper)," IEEE J. Quantum Electron. QE-22, 1413–1430 (August 1986).
- A. E. Siegman and P. M. Fauchet, "Stimulated Wood's anomalies on laser-illuminated surfaces (invited paper)," IEEE J. Quantum Electron. QE-22, 1384–1403 (August 1986).
- R. Trebino, E. K. Gustafson and A. E. Siegman, "Fourth-order partial-coherence effects in the formation of integrated-intensity gratings with pulsed light sources," J. Opt. Soc. Am. B 3, 1295–1307 (October 1986).
- A. E. Siegman, "Axial modes in a grating-dispersed laser cavity," Appl. Phys. B 42, 165-166 (1987).
- A. Kostenbauder, S. J. B. Yoo and A. E. Siegman, "A fast diffusion-driven photodetector: Theory and experiment," IEEE J. Quantum Electron. QE-24, 240-244 (February 1988).
- A. E. Siegman, "Two-dimensional calculations using one-dimensional arrays, or `Life on the Skew'," Computers in Physics ??, 74-75 (November/December 1988).
- A. E. Siegman, "Excess spontaneous emission in non-hermitian optical systems. I. Laser amplifiers," Phys. Rev. A 39, 1253–1263 (1 February 1989).
- D. J. McGraw, A. E. Siegman, G. M. Wallraff and R. D. Miller, "Resolution of the nuclear and electronic contributions to the optical nonlinearity in polysilanes," Appl. Phys. Lett. 54, 1713–1715 (1 May 1989).
- A. E. Siegman, P. L. Mussche and J.-L. Doumont, "Excess spontaneous emission factor in variable-reflectivity-mirror lasers," IEEE J. Quantum Electron. QE-25, 1960–1967 (August 1989).
- C. E. Barker, R. Trebino, A. G. Kostenbauder and A. E. Siegman, "Frequency-domain observation of the ultrafast inertial response of the optical Kerr effect in CS2," J. Chem. Phys. 92, 4740-4748 (15 April 1990).
- A. E. Siegman, M. W. Sasnett and J. T. F. Johnston, "Choice of clip levels for beam width measurements using knife-edge techniques," IEEE J. Quantum Electron. QE-27, 1098–1104 (April 1991).
- A. E. Siegman, "Defining the effective radius of curvature for a nonideal optical beam," IEEE J. Quantum Electron. QE-27, 1146–1148 (May 1991).
- A. E. Siegman, "Performance limitations of the self-filtering unstable resonator," Opt. Commun. 88, 295-297 (1 April 1992).
- T. F. Johnston, Jr., M. W. Sasnett, J.-l. Doumont and A. E. Siegman, "Laser beam quality versus aperture size in a cw argon-ion laser," Opt. Lett. 17, 198-200 (1 February 1992).
- J. A. Ruff and A. E. Siegman, "Single pulse laser beam quality measurements using a CCD camera system," Appl. Opt. 31, 4907-4909 (20 August 1992).
- A. E. Siegman, "Stable-unstable resonator design for a wide-tuning-range free electron laser," IEEE J. Quantum Electron. QE-28, 1243–1247 (May 1992).
- A. E. Siegman, "Binary phase plates cannot improve laser beam quality," Opt. Lett. 18, 675-677 (1 May 1993).
- A. E. Siegman, "Analysis of laser beam quality degradation caused by spherical aberration," Appl. Opt. 32, 5893-5901 (20 October 1993).
- A. E. Siegman and S. W. Townsend, "Output beam propagation and beam quality from a multimode stable-cavity laser," IEEE J. Quantum Electron. QE-29, 1212–1217 (April 1993).
- J. Chung and A. E. Siegman, "Singly resonant continuous-wave mode-locked KTiOPO4 optical parametric oscillator pumped by Nd:YAG laser," J. Opt. Soc. Am. B 11, 2201–2210 (November 1993).
- Y. Sun, D. Francis, S. Biellak, A. E. Siegman and C. J. Chang-Hasnain, "Beam steerable semiconductor lasers with a large steering range and resolvable spots," Electron. Lett. 30, 2034–2035 (24 November 1994).
- G. Nemes and A. E. Siegman, "Measurement of all ten second moments of an astigmatic beam by the use of rotating simple astigmatic (anamorphic) optics," J. Opt. Soc. Am. A 11, 2257–2264 (August 1994).
- J. A. Ruff and A. E. Siegman, "Measurement of beam quality degradation due to spherical aberration in a simple lens," Opt. Quantum Electron. 26, 629-32 (June 1994).
- Y.-J. Cheng, P. L. Mussche and A. E. Siegman, "Measurement of laser quantum frequency fluctuations using a Pound-Drever stabilization system," IEEE J. Quantum Electron. QE-30, 1498–1504 (June 1994).
- S. A. Biellak, Y. Sun, S. S. Wong and A. E. Siegman, "Lateral mode behavior of reactive-ion-etched stable-resonator semiconductor lasers," J. Appl. Phys. 78, 4294-4296 (15 September 1995).
- D. Francis, Y. Sun, S. Biellak, A. E. Siegman and C. J. Chang-Hasnain, "Optical characteristics of beam steerable semiconductor fan laser array," Electron. Lett. 31, 1922–1924 (26 October 1995).
- A. Kostenbauder, Y. Sun and A. E. Siegman, "Series expansions using biorthogonal eigenfunctions: Complex-valued Hermite gaussians," manuscript in preparation (1995).
- Y.-J. Cheng, P. L. Mussche and A. E. Siegman, "Cavity decay rate and relaxation oscillation frequency in unconventional laser cavities," IEEE J. Quantum Electron. QE-31, 391-398 (February 1995).
- A. E. Siegman, "Lasers without photons -- or should it be lasers with too many photons," Appl. Phys. B 60, 247-257 (February/March 1995).
- Y. Sun, C. G. Fanning, S. A. Biellak and A. E. Siegman, "Thermally controlled lateral beam shift and beam steering in semiconductor lasers," IEEE Photonics Technol. Lett. 7, 26-28 (January 1995).
- J. Chung and A. E. Siegman, "Optical-Kerr-enhanced mode locking of a lamp-pumped Nd:YAG laser," IEEE J. Quantum Electron. QE-31, 582-590 (March 1995).
- Y.-J. Cheng, G. Fanning and A. E. Siegman, "Transverse mode astigmatism in a diode-pumped unstable-resonator Nd:YVO4 laser," Appl. Opt. 35, submitted April 1996 (1996).
- S. A. Biellak, G. Fanning, Y. Sun, S. S. Wong and A. E. Siegman, "Reaction-ion-etched diffraction-limited unstable-resonator semiconductor lasers," IEEE J. Quantum Electron. submitted for publication (1996).
- Y.-J. Cheng, G. Fanning and A. E. Siegman, "Experimental observation of a large excess quantum noise factor in the linewidth of a laser oscillator using nonorthogonal modes (??)," Phys. Rev. Lett. submitted for publication (January 1996).
- Y. Sun and A. E. Siegman, "Optical mode properties of laterally offset gain and index guiding structures," IEEE J. Quantum Electron. 32, 790-795 (May1996).
- A. E. Siegman, "The oddball properties of unstable optical resonators (Ives Medal Address)," J. Opt. Soc. Am. A to be submitted (maybe someday!) (1999).

== See also ==
- Optical Society of America#Past Presidents of the OSA
