= Fuqua =

- Language: English

Origin
- Word/name: United States

Fuqua is an American surname, possibly an Americanization of the French surname Fouquet.

Fuqua may refer to:

== People ==
=== Arts and entertainment ===
- Antoine Fuqua (born 1966), American film director
- Charlie Fuqua (1910–1971), American singer, member of The Ink Spots
- Chris (Critter) Fuqua, American musician, former member of Old Crow Medicine Show
- Gwen Gordy Fuqua (1927–1999), American businesswoman, songwriter and composer; onetime wife of Harvey Fuqua
- Harvey Fuqua (1929–2010), American singer and music industry executive
- Joseph Fuqua (born 1962), American actor, director, instructor, and playwright
- Matt Fuqua, American musician, member of The Afters
- Robert Fuqua, pen name of American pulp painter and illustrator Joseph Wirt Tillotson (1905–1959)

=== Government ===
- Don Fuqua (born 1933), American politician from Florida
- Henry L. Fuqua (1865–1926), American government official and politician; 38th Governor of Louisiana
- William Fuqua (born 1930), Justice of the Kentucky Supreme Court

=== Military ===
- Samuel G. Fuqua (1899–1987), US Navy seaman and Medal of Honor recipient
- Stephen O. Fuqua (1874–1943), career officer in the United States Army

=== Sports ===
- Ade Fuqua (born 1970), American football player and public official
- Charles Fuqua "Charlie" Manuel Jr. (born 1944), American baseball player and manager
- Ivan Fuqua (1909–1994), American track athlete and coach
- John "Frenchy" Fuqua (born 1946), American football fullback
- Ray Fuqua (1912–1983), American football end for the Brooklyn Dodgers
- Rich Fuqua (born 1950), American college basketball player

=== Other ===
- J. B. Fuqua (1918–2006), American businessman and philanthropist

== Places ==
All in the United States

- Fuqua, Texas, a ghost town in Liberty County
- Fuqua Farm, a historic property in Chesterfield County, Virginia
- Fuqua Lake, a reservoir located in Stephens County, Oklahoma
- Jeff Fuqua Boulevard, location of the Orlando International Airport in Florida

== Schools ==
- Fuqua School of Business at Duke University, named after J. B. Fuqua
- Fuqua School in Farmville, Virginia, named after J. B. Fuqua

== See also ==
- Fuquay (disambiguation)
