= Adewole =

- Gender: Male
- Language: Yoruba

Origin
- Origin: Nigerian
- Region of origin: South -West Nigeria

Adéwọlé is a surname or first name of Yoruba origin, meaning "the crown or royalty has entered the (family) house". Notable people with the name include:

- Isaac Folorunso Adewole (born 1954), Nigerian professor of gynaecology and obstetrics
- Emmanuel Adewole (Born 1993), successful Christian business magnate in Artificial intelligence and Investment Banking
- Tobi Adewole (born 1995), is an American soccer player
- Kayode Sakariyah Adewole (born 1982), is a lecturer at University of Ilorin, Nigeria. His Google Scholar profile is available here.
- Adewole (Wole) Akosile Australian Addiction medicine specialist and Novelist. His website is available here

== See also ==
- Adewale
