= Ade Iwan Setiawan =

Indonesian footballer

Ade Iwan
Personal information
- Full name: Ade Iwan Setiawan
- Date of birth: 19 March 1984 (age 42)
- Place of birth: Indonesia
- Height: 1.70 m (5 ft 7 in)
- Position: Defender

Senior career*
Years	Team	Apps	(Gls)
2009–2010	Persikabo Bogor	6	(0)
2010–2011	Persih Tembilahan	11	(0)
2011–2012	Persiwa Wamena	12	(0)
2012	Bhayangkara Presisi Lampung F.C.	6	(0)
2013–2015	Villa 2000	29	(1)
- * Club domestic league appearances and goals

Ade Iwan Setiawan (born March 19, 1984) is an Indonesian former footballer.

== Club career statistics ==
As of 26 May 2012.

Club performance			League		Cup		League Cup		Total	
Season	Club	League	Apps	Goals	Apps	Goals	Apps	Goals	Apps	Goals
Indonesia			League		Piala Indonesia		League Cup		Total	
2009–10	Persikabo Bogor	Premier Division	6	0	2	1	-		8	1
2010–11	Persih Tembilahan	Premier Division	11	0	-		-		11	0
2011–12	Persiwa Wamena	Super League	12	0	-		-		12	0
Total	Indonesia		29	0	2	1	-		31	1
Career total			29	0	2	1	-		31	1
