= Moritz Waldemeyer =

British/German designer and engineer (born 1974)

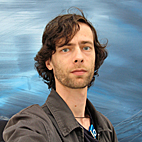
Moritz Waldemeyer

Moritz Waldemeyer (born 1974) is a British/German designer and engineer. He trained as an engineer at King's College London, completing his master's degree in 2001. Since then, he has collaborated with many of the world’s top architects and fashion designers including Ron Arad, Zaha Hadid and Hussein Chalayan. His work represents a fusion of technology, art, fashion, and design.

== Collaborations ==
Having worked as a research scientist at Phillips, Waldemeyer transitioned to design engineering, contributing to projects such as Ron Arad’s Lolita and Miss Haze Chandeliers, which feature interactive LED lights: Lolita displays text messages sent to it, while Miss Haze allows users to create an LED image on its crystal surface via a PalmPilot.

Other prestigious projects he has worked on include Yves Behar’s Voyage Chandelier (2005), Zaha Hadid’s Z Island kitchen (2006), FredricksonStallard’s Pandora Chandelier (2007), and Hussein Chalayan’s transforming dresses (s/s 2007 One Hundred and Eleven), video dresses (s/s 2007 Airborne), and laser dresses (s/s 2008 Readings).

== Exhibitions ==
Waldemeyer has recently shifted his focus from collaborative work to establishing himself as an independent designer. He held his debut exhibition, Electric Kid, at the Rabih Hage Gallery in 2006, showcasing a modern interpretation of the roulette table, Ping Pong table and mirror, all incorporating LED lights and duPont Corian. His second exhibition, By Royal Appointment (Gallery Libby Sellers 2007) featured a revolutionary chair that detects the colour of the user's outfit and projects a personalized aura of light into the surrounding space.

== Commissions ==
In 2007, Waldemeyer designed stage jackets with embedded LEDS for the alternative rock band OK Go and created interactive mirrors for Selfridges’ Wonder Room. That year, he also worked on several commissions, including designing a chandelier for Microsoft Zune that responds to music sent to it and raising £2000 at the ICA Charity Gala auction with Joyrider: two components that attach to the spokes of a bicycle wheel, emitting a fixed image of a smiley face each using a single LED light.
