= Alabi Adewale =

Nigerian footballer (born 2001)

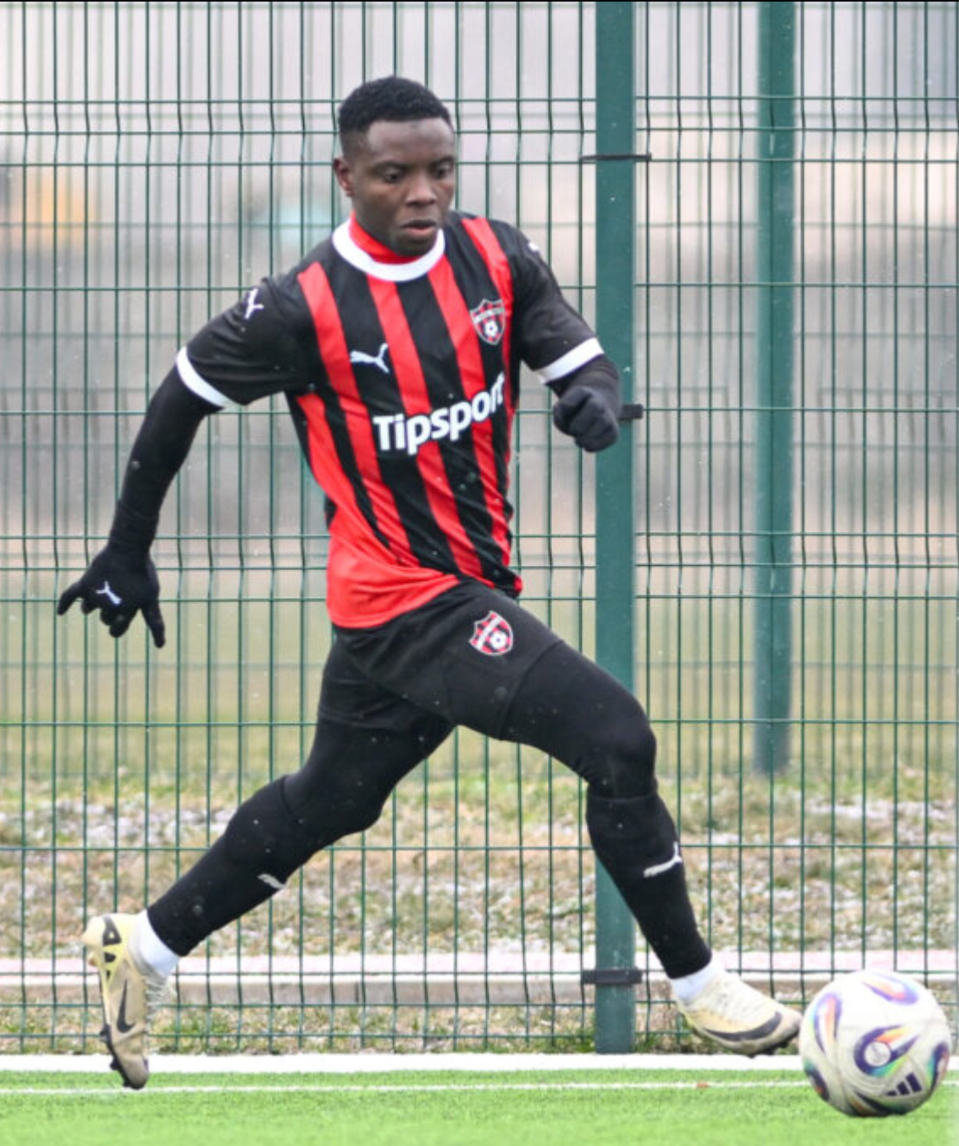
- Adewale trialing with Spartak Trnava in 2026

Personal information
- Date of birth: 3 January 2001 (age 25)
- Place of birth: Ibadan, Nigeria
- Height: 1.78 m (5 ft 10 in)
- Position: Wingback

Team information
- Current team: Dukla Banská Bystrica

Senior career*
Years	Team	Apps	(Gls)
–2020	Prince Kazeem		
2020–2021	Ankara Keçiörengücü	2	(0)
2021–2022	Wikki Tourists		
2022–2023	Hamprince SC		
2023	FK The Dragons		
2023–2025	Baník Lehota		
2025	ŠKF Sereď		
2025–2026	Dynamo Malženice	29	(3)
2026–	Dukla Banská Bystrica	7	(0)
- * Club domestic league appearances and goals as of 21 September 2026

Toheeb Alabi Adewale (born 2 January 2001; also referred to as Adewale Alabi) is a Nigerian footballer who plays as a wingback for Slovak First Football League side MFK Dukla Banská Bystrica.

== Early life ==
Adewale was born in the city of Ibadan in Nigeria.

== Club career ==
Adewale started his career at Nigerian club Prince Azeem. He later moved abroad to Turkish club Ankara Keciörengücü. He later returned to Nigeria, then came back to Slovakia. He gained his first contact at FK The Dragons, a local amateur team for foreigners in Bratislava and the surrounding area playing in the 7. Liga. He later also played for OFK Baník Lehota pod Vtáčnikom and ŠKF Sereď before transferring to 2. Liga side Dynamo Maženice in 2025. In January 2026, he trialed with Slovak First Football League side, Spartak Trnava. He played 2 friendly games in the club's winter preparations. After returning to Malženice, he scored a brace against second league leaders, Dukla Banska Bystrica, securing a 3–1 win. In May 2026, it was announced that Adewale would become the first summer signing of newly promoted first league side Dukla Banska Bystrica, joining on a 2-year contract.
