= Ade Tuyo =

Nigerian businessman

Joshua Ade Tuyo
- Born: Nigeria
- Occupations: Nigerian Railway Corporation, entrepreneur

Joshua Ade Tuyo was a prominent Nigerian businessman from Ijebu-Ode, Ogun State.

== Life ==
He was born into the family of an Ijebu farmer and indigo trader. Originally trained as a teacher, he left the teaching profession for office work. He spent two dozen years as a clerical staff for the Nigerian Railway Corporation, the British Bank of West Africa and the ministry of Commerce, and retired in 1953. During his clerical years, he married an Ijebu woman who was born into a trading family in Onitsha. His wife took to trading while Ade was familiarizing himself with office work, as this was the dominant gender course taken by many Nigerian households during the pre-colonial and early colonial period. In late 1949, Mrs Ade Tuyo lost most of her trading goods in a robbery operation. Desiring to go into a much more secure business, she entered a training course for bakery. After Mr Ade Tuyo retired, he sensed the potential in the bakery business. This intuition was partly fostered by the support given to indigenous entrepreneurs by the federal government. He pursued a successful loan application from the Federal Loans Board. He started De Facto Works, a catering and Bakery company. By 1969, his was the largest bakery service in the country.
