= Ade Hassan =

British businesswoman

Ade Hassan MBE
- Education: Duke University; School of Oriental and African Studies
- Organization(s): Nubian Skin, founder

Adetola Kunle-Hassan, MBE (born April 1984), known as Ade Hassan, is a British businesswoman who founded Nubian Skin in 2014.

== Early life ==
Hassan was born in April 1984. She was raised partly in Nigeria and speaks Yoruba. Both of her parents are in business. She received her advanced education at Duke University in the United States where she studied English and economics, after which she completed a master's degree at the School of Oriental and African Studies in London.

== Career ==
Her early career was in the private-equity business but she took a break from that for a year to take sewing and pattern cutting classes. She founded Nubian Skin, which makes underwear in dark tones for women of colour, in 2014 after she was unable to purchase clothing for herself in her preferred colours. In 2014 she was named Fashion Entrepreneur of the Year at the Great British Entrepreneur Awards. In October 2015 Ade's brand, Nubian Skin, was nominated for Hosiery Brand of the Year at the UK Lingerie Awards and won UK's Favourite British Designer of the Year. She was appointed a Member of the Order of the British Empire in the 2017 Queen's Birthday Honours for services to fashion.
