= Ade Fuqua =

American football player (born 1974)

Adé Fuqua (born January 17, 1974, in Brooklyn, New York) is the former Chief of Staff, Office of the Managing Director – Deputy Mayor of Administration & Coordination, City of Philadelphia. His main focus while in government was to reduce violent, gun-related crime in Philadelphia. A former professional American football wide receiver, who in his early career was duly recognized for being a music industry professional Singer/Songwriter. Fuqua is fully bilingual Spanish of African American, Puerto Rican, and French Créole descent. Raised mainly in the Philadelphia Tri-State area.

== Biography ==
=== Politics ===
Fuqua is considered an expert in the development of initiatives to significantly reduce or eliminate violent crimes while improving community policing and engagement. In 2011, Fuqua became assistant managing director, of the city of Philadelphia, in Mayor Michael A. Nutter's administration. His accomplishments include being recognized as one of the city's top Difference Makers and the creation of the Philadelphia Youth Music Partnership.

In 2013, Fuqua was promoted to a City Chartered position, Deputy Managing Director, City of Philadelphia. One of his primary responsibilities in serving this role was to help design and lead as the director of the mayor's now nationally recognized community engagement policing model called the PhillyRising Collaborative. PhillyRising is credited with helping lower violent crime while improving the quality of life for citizens living in some of the most challenged areas throughout the city. After strategically implementing the program citywide and meeting its purpose of reducing crime while improving quality of life, Fuqua was recognized during Hispanic American History Month as one of Philadelphia's Most Influential Latinos 2014.

Fuqua's outgoing leadership style along with his reputation for getting things done with compassion for the citizens of Philadelphia, led to yet another promotion in 2014 when he accepted an appointment to the senior executive team as chief of staff, Office of the Managing Director – Deputy Mayor of Coordination & Administration. In this role, Fuqua serves as senior advisor to the City of Philadelphia's Managing Director – Deputy Mayor of Administration & Coordination on key departmental operations and external affairs .

He also assisted in managing the City of Philadelphia's vital infrastructure operational departments and special projects, involving intense oversight of the daily operations for some of the city's essential service-oriented departments that drive the mayor's strategic goals in community engagement and public safety. Fuqua was also involved in creating and maintaining outstanding internal and external relations, which included daily interactions with the city council, commissioners, citizens and other elected officials in order to achieve the mayor's strategic goals and 5-year plan.

=== Sports ===
Fuqua began to develop an interest in professional football after having a good workout in May 2003 at the Professional Football Scout Camp Combine. He is a former Free Agent American Football wide receiver in the National Football League and NFLE with prototypical wide receiver skills and the athletic ability to play on the professional level even with a limited football background. His football career never gained much momentum due to his lack of focus in the game caused by distractions from his more productive career in music.

=== Music ===
In 2001, Fuqua was a member of the Pop Singing Sensation "South Street". As a member of South Street, Fuqua partnered with the Philadelphia 76ers to become part of the first Afro-American Latino pop group to perform the National Anthem for two consecutive years in the First Union Center in remembrance of Martin Luther King Day. The duo also participated in many charity events with the Philadelphia 76ers to support local youth activities. Fuqua has also been noted for his work as executive producer for Eastside Productions Inc. Fuqua has family ties in film, sports and entertainment, and is responsible for the production of several recognized compositions.

== Sources ==
- Philadelphia Sixers Homepage.
- Philadelphia Weekly News article.
- Faqs.org copyrights "Playa to Praya".
- El Sol news http://elsoln1.com/news/2014/oct/27/ade-fuqua/
- Senior Staff of Managing Director https://www.phila.gov/MDO/AboutUs/Pages/SeniorStaff.aspx#page=1
- Appointment to Chief of Staff https://phillymdo.wordpress.com/2015/01/26/decemberjanuary-2015/
