= Adewale =

- Gender: Male
- Language: Yoruba

Origin
- Origin: Nigeria
- Meaning: the crown or royalty has come home
- Region of origin: South western Nigeria

Adéwálé (Yoruba pronunciation: [ādéwálé]) is both a given name and a surname of Yoruba origin, meaning "the crown or royalty has come home". Notable people with the name include:

== Given name ==
- Adewale Ademoyega (born c. 1934), Nigerian Army officer
- Adewale Akinnuoye-Agbaje (born 1967), British actor and model
- Prince Adewale Aladesanmi (1938–2017), Nigerian businessman
- Adewale Sunday Amusan (born 1989), Nigerian footballer
- Adewale Ayuba (born 1966), Nigerian singer-songwriter
- Adewale Maja-Pearce (born 1953), Anglo-Nigerian writer, journalist and literary critic
- Adewale Ogunleye (born 1977), American football player
- Adewale Ojomo (born 1988), American football player
- Adewale Olukoju (born 1968), Nigerian discus thrower and shot putter
- Adewale Tinubu (born 1967), Nigerian businessman, consultant and lawyer
- Adewale Wahab (born 1984), Nigerian footballer

== Surname ==
- Segun Adewale (born 1955), Nigerian musician
- Alabi Adewale (born 2001), Nigerian footballer

== Fictional characters ==
- Adéwalé, a character in the video game series Assassin's Creed

== See also ==
- Adewole
