= Nick Fouquet =

French-American fashion designer

- Born: February 17, 1983 (age 43); New York City, US
- Education: Rollins College
- Occupation: fashion designer

Nick Fouquet (February 17, 1983) is a French-American fashion designer, and founder of the eponymous brand Nick Fouquet.

== Biography ==
Nick Fouquet was born on February 17, 1983, in New York City to Bernard Fouquet and Lavinia Baker. He is one of six children, and has five sisters, three older and two younger.

He spent his childhood in Royan in the South West of France and Palm Beach, Florida. Fouquet graduated from Rollins College in Florida with a BA in Environmental Science and Sustainable Development. After graduating from college, he moved to Patagonia and then to Australia. Fouquet later moved to Venice, California where he mastered pattern making and design classes at the Otis College of Art and Design.

He founded his own brand in a Los Angeles garage studio in 2013. The Nick Fouquet brand is headquartered in Venice, California.

Nick Fouquet opened his flagship store in 2014 in Venice, CA.

In 2016, he became a member of the Council of Fashion Designers of America.

Between 2018 and 2022 Fouquet opened numerous popup stores in Austin, Mexico City, Doha, and East Hampton.

Nick Fouquet collaborated with European houses including Borsalino, Rochas, and Givenchy. In the US Fouquet has partnered with Jacques Marie Mage, Lucchese, and Mycoworks launching Fine Mycelium into the market for the first time in 2022.

In 2019, Fouquet was featured in bestselling street photography book Garçon Style: New York, London, Milano, Paris by London-based photographer Jonathan Daniel Pryce.

In 2020, the designer created styles for Clare Waight Keller's FW20 menswear collection at Givenchy in Paris, and collections for Palm Angels, and Rochas.

In March 2022, Nick Fouquet presented a collection of men's and women's shoes, hats and accessories created in collaboration with Lucchese.

In January 2021, the designer presented his first collection ready-to-wear for men and women made in Italy and USA. Collection consists of cropped and tailored jackets, loose-fitting suits, and oversized shirts. Fabrics include corduroys, linens, and knitwear with intricate embroidered detail and patchwork.

== Design ==
Fouquet specializes in headwear design, focusing on the traditional hatmakers of Western America. In addition to hats, the designer also creates other accessories such as leather goods, apparel, and eyewear.

The designer's clients include Lady Gaga, Keith Richards, Pharrell Williams, David Beckham, Madonna, Jennifer Lopez, Tom Brady, Cara Delevingne, Brad Pitt, Justin Bieber, LeBron James, Kate Moss, Johnny Depp, Rihanna and J Balvin.

== Personal life ==
Fouquet's house in Los Angeles is a rare 1970s geodesic dome building. It is located in Topanga Canyon and was renovated by Fouquet and Timothy McCarthy, an architect from Los Angeles. The house appeared on the cover of Elle Décor magazine in October 2021.

== See also ==
- Council of Fashion Designers of America
