= Julie Fouquet =

American applied physicist

- Born: Julie Elizabeth Fouquet; March 23, 1958 (age 68); Palo Alto, California, US
- Education: Harvard University (BA); Stanford University (Ph.D)
- Spouse: George Andrew Zdasiuk
- Awards: Fellow of IEEE For contributions to optical switch and light-emitting device technologies

Julie Elizabeth Fouquet (born March 23, 1958) is an American applied physicist, engineer, laser scientist, and inventor known for her work in optical networking and wave power.

== Education ==
Fouquet was born in Palo Alto, California. She majored in physics at Harvard University (Radcliffe College), advised by Edward Mills Purcell. At Harvard, she served as the undergraduate representative on the university's Advisory Committee on Shareholder Responsibility, but resigned in 1978 in protest of its makeup and behavior. She graduated Phi Beta Kappa in 1980, and earned a Ph.D. in applied physics from Stanford University in 1986, with the dissertation Recombination Dynamics in Quantum Well Semiconductor Structures supervised by laser scientist Anthony E. Siegman.

== Career ==
She began working for HP Labs in 1985, and later worked for the HP spin-off company Agilent Technologies. There, she developed all-optical switches based on reflection of light from bubbles in a fluid, generated using the same technology used for inkjet printers. In 2004, she was named a Fellow of the IEEE, "for contributions to optical switch and light-emitting device technologies". Parts of Agilent spun off again into Avago Technologies in 2005, and Fouquet came to work for Avago as a senior principal research scientist.

In 2015, she founded 3newable LLC, a company focused on developing renewable energy from ocean waves.
