= Jacques Foucquet =

French painter

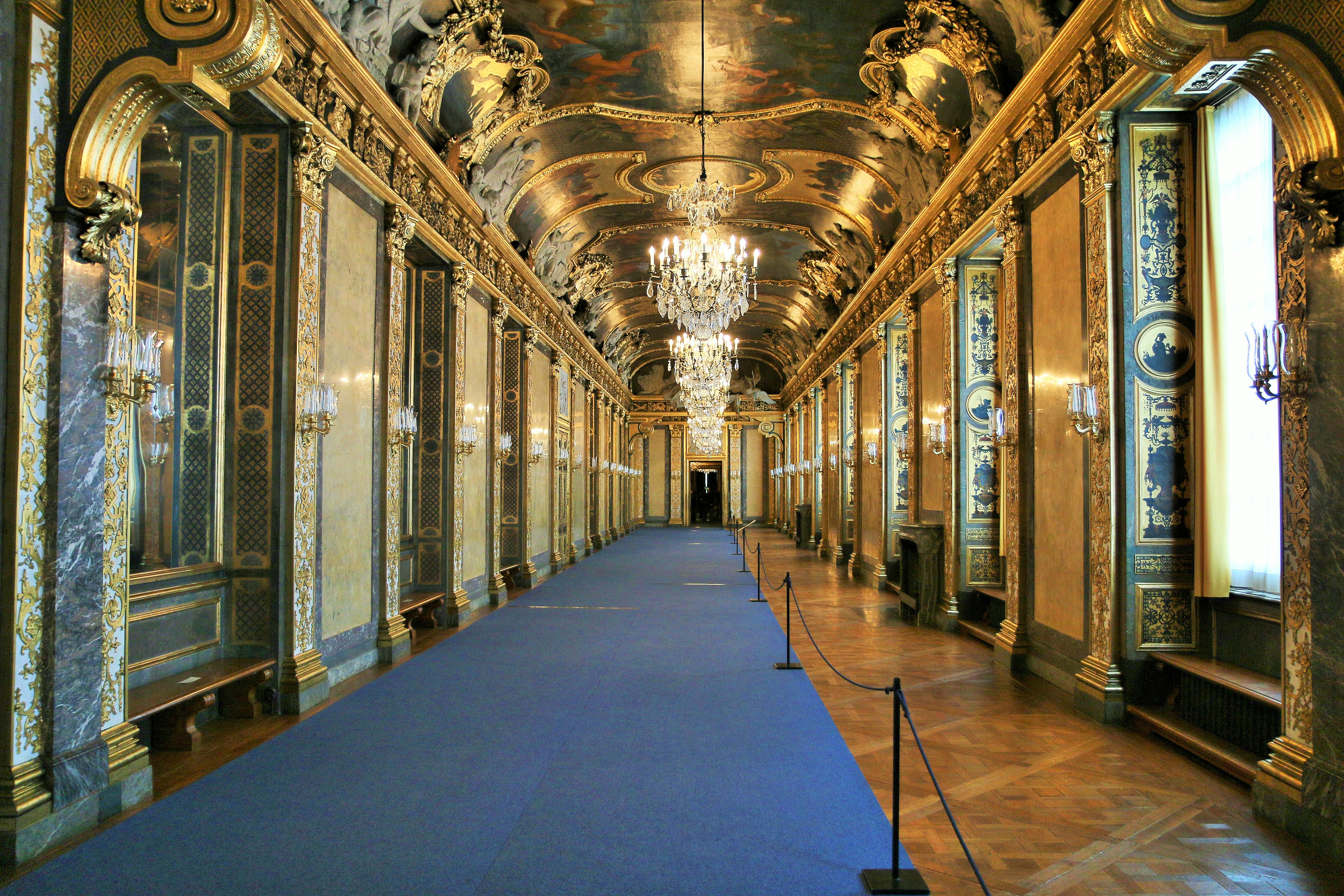
Ceiling panels in the gallery of Charles XI

Jacques Foucquet (French: [ʒak fukɛ]; active 1685–1704) was a French artist primarily active in Sweden.

== Biography ==
Before becoming active as a painter in Stockholm, Sweden, Jacques Foucquet was employed as an officer and engineer in the court of Louis XIV. He was educated at Académie Royale de Peinture et de Sculpture in Paris, and heavily influenced by Charles Le Brun. He arrived in Sweden in 1694 with a group of other French artists, on the invitation of Nicodemus Tessin the Younger, who needed artists for the planned monumental historical and allegorical works in the newly built Royal Palace in Stockholm.

Foucquet's most famous works in the Stockholm palace are the three central ceiling panels (1700–02) of the vault in the State Apartment of the north wing, the Gallery of Charles XI of Sweden. The paintings in this gallery and in the adjoining Cabinet of Peace and Cabinet of War depict a victorious king on the battlefield during the Scanian War and the peace that followed when the Danish princess Ulrike Eleonora, sister of Christian V, married Charles XI. The iconography represent the King dressed as a classical military commander of Rome and the works are steeped in classical mythology. The ceiling was created by Jacques Foucquet and sculptor René Chauveau.
