= Ade Mochtar =

Indonesian footballer

Ade Muhtar
Personal information
- Full name: Ade Mochtar
- Date of birth: 26 August 1979 (age 47)
- Place of birth: South Halmahera, Indonesia
- Height: 1.78 m (5 ft 10 in)
- Position: Goalkeeper

Senior career*
Years	Team	Apps	(Gls)
2006–2007	Persibom Bolaang Mongondow	26	(0)
2007	Persma Manado	12	(0)
2008–2009	Persigo Gorontalo	18	(0)
2009–2011	Bontang	33	(0)
2011–2012	Gresik United	28	(0)
2013–2014	Arema	8	(0)
Total		125	(0)
- * Club domestic league appearances and goals

Ade Mochtar or Ade Muhtar (born 26 August 1979) is an Indonesian former footballer. He currently the head coach of Rabudaiyo Soccer School in his homeland.
