= 1992–93 NBA season =

47th NBA season

- League: National Basketball Association
- Sport: Basketball
- Duration: November 6, 1992 – April 25, 1993; April 29 – June 5, 1993 (Playoffs); June 9 – 20, 1993 (Finals)
- Teams: 27
- TV partner(s): NBC, TBS, TNT

Draft
- Top draft pick: Shaquille O'Neal
- Picked by: Orlando Magic

Regular season
- Top seed: Phoenix Suns
- Season MVP: Charles Barkley (Phoenix)
- Top scorer: Michael Jordan (Chicago)

Playoffs
- Eastern champions: Chicago Bulls
- Eastern runners-up: New York Knicks
- Western champions: Phoenix Suns
- Western runners-up: Seattle SuperSonics

Finals
- Champions: Chicago Bulls
- Runners-up: Phoenix Suns
- Finals MVP: Michael Jordan (Chicago)

NBA seasons
- ← 1991–92 1993–94 →

The 1992–93 NBA season was the 47th season of the National Basketball Association. The season ended with the Chicago Bulls winning their third straight NBA championship, beating the Phoenix Suns 4 games to 2 in the NBA Finals.

== Notable occurrences ==
Coaching changes
Offseason
Team	1991–92 coach	1992–93 coach
Denver Nuggets	Paul Westhead	Dan Issel
Detroit Pistons	Chuck Daly	Ron Rothstein
Los Angeles Lakers	Mike Dunleavy, Sr.	Randy Pfund
Milwaukee Bucks	Frank Hamblen	Mike Dunleavy, Sr.
New Jersey Nets	Bill Fitch	Chuck Daly
Philadelphia 76ers	Jim Lynam	Doug Moe
Phoenix Suns	Cotton Fitzsimmons	Paul Westphal
Sacramento Kings	Rex Hughes	Garry St. Jean
San Antonio Spurs	Bob Bass	Jerry Tarkanian
In-season
Team	Outgoing coach	Incoming coach
Dallas Mavericks	Richie Adubato	Gar Heard
Minnesota Timberwolves	Jimmy Rodgers	Sidney Lowe
Philadelphia 76ers	Doug Moe	Fred Carter
San Antonio Spurs	Jerry Tarkanian	Rex Hughes
San Antonio Spurs	Rex Hughes	John Lucas

- The 1993 NBA All-Star Game was played at the Delta Center in Salt Lake City, Utah, with the West defeating the East 135–132 in overtime. Much to delight of the local fans, Karl Malone and John Stockton of the Utah Jazz were named co-MVPs of the game.
- The Phoenix Suns played their first season at America West Arena (now Mortgage Matchup Center).
- The San Antonio Spurs played their final season in the HemisFair Arena.
- The Charlotte Hornets became the first of the four late 1980s expansion franchises to win a playoff series on Alonzo Mourning's 20-foot jumper at the buzzer in Game 4 of their first round playoff series against the Boston Celtics.
- Michael Jordan scored his 20,000th career point and tied Wilt Chamberlain's record of seven scoring titles.
- In Game 3 of the NBA Finals, the Suns defeated the Bulls in triple overtime, 129–121. This marked the second time a Finals game lasted three overtimes, along with Game 5 of the 1976 Finals, which also involved the Suns. Coincidentally, in the 1976 game, Paul Westphal played for the Suns, and in the 1993 game, he coached the Suns.
- Michael Jordan scored 40 or more points in 4 consecutive games of the NBA Finals, setting a record, and averaged an NBA Finals record 41.0 points per game for the series.
- The Chicago Bulls defeated the Phoenix Suns in the NBA Finals to become the first team in almost 30 years to win three consecutive championships.
- New Jersey Nets guard Dražen Petrović was killed in an automobile accident in Munich, Germany on June 7. Almost two months later, on July 27, Boston Celtics guard Reggie Lewis collapsed during practice and died of a heart condition later the same day. Both were later honored by their respective teams by retiring their numbers, and Petrovic would be eventually inducted into the Basketball Hall of Fame.
- The Dallas Mavericks became the third team to lose 70 games in a season, after the 1972–73 Philadelphia 76ers and the 1986–87 Los Angeles Clippers, they finished 11–71. They would later be joined by the 1997–98 Denver Nuggets, the 2009–10 New Jersey Nets and the 2015–16 Philadelphia 76ers.
- During the regular season, there were three instances where games had to be stopped due to damage to the goals.
  - On February 7 in the game between the Orlando Magic and the Phoenix Suns at America West Arena, Magic rookie Shaquille O'Neal went up for a dunk and the recoil due to his massive size was too much for the stanchion to bear; the supports detached and the basket folded in on itself.
  - On March 12, during a game between the Chicago Bulls and New Jersey Nets at Brendan Byrne Arena that was televised nationally on TNT, Nets forward Chris Morris shattered the glass behind the rim with a forceful dunk.
  - On April 23, in another game played in New Jersey between the Nets and Magic, O'Neal struck again; this time, he dunked with so much force that the entire backboard, including the shot clock positioned above it, was pulled off the goal. This led the league to provide stronger shatterproof backboards. However, every team is still required to have a spare backboard in their home arenas just in case.
- On April 14, during a timeout in the third quarter of a Chicago Bulls-Miami Heat game, spectator Don Calhoun made a 75-foot shot through the basket from the free-throw line at the opposite end of the court, winning himself 1-million dollars.

== 1992–93 NBA changes ==
- The Atlanta Hawks changed their uniforms.
- The Chicago Bulls changed their uniforms.
- The Dallas Mavericks changed their road uniforms from green to blue.
- The New York Knicks changed their logo.
- The Phoenix Suns changed their logo, uniforms, and moved into America West Arena.

== Standings ==
=== By division ===
Eastern Conference

Atlantic Division	W	L	PCT	GB	Home	Road	Div
y-New York Knicks	60	22	.732	—	37–4	23–18	23–5
x-Boston Celtics	48	34	.585	12	28–13	20–21	19–9
x-New Jersey Nets	43	39	.524	17	26–15	17–24	14–14
Orlando Magic	41	41	.500	19	27–14	14–27	15–13
Miami Heat	36	46	.439	24	26–15	10–31	9–19
Philadelphia 76ers	26	56	.317	34	15–26	11–30	11–17
Washington Bullets	22	60	.268	38	15–26	7–34	7–21

Central Division	W	L	PCT	GB	Home	Road	Div
y-Chicago Bulls	57	25	.695	—	31–10	26–15	19–9
x-Cleveland Cavaliers	54	28	.659	3	35–6	19–22	22–6
x-Charlotte Hornets	44	38	.537	13	22–19	22–19	12–16
x-Atlanta Hawks	43	39	.524	14	25–16	18–23	12–16
x-Indiana Pacers	41	41	.500	16	27–14	14–27	11–17
Detroit Pistons	40	42	.488	17	28–13	12–29	12–16
Milwaukee Bucks	28	54	.341	29	18–23	10–31	10–18

Western Conference

Midwest Division	W	L	PCT	GB	Home	Road	Div
y-Houston Rockets	55	27	.671	—	31–10	24–17	19–7
x-San Antonio Spurs	49	33	.598	6	31–10	18–23	17–9
x-Utah Jazz	47	35	.573	8	28–13	19–22	16–10
Denver Nuggets	36	46	.439	19	28–13	8–33	13–13
Minnesota Timberwolves	19	63	.232	36	11–30	8–33	10–16
Dallas Mavericks	11	71	.134	44	7–34	4–37	3–23

Pacific Division	W	L	PCT	GB	Home	Road	Div
y-Phoenix Suns	62	20	.756	—	35–6	27–14	21–9
x-Seattle SuperSonics	55	27	.671	7	33–8	22–19	22–8
x-Portland Trail Blazers	51	31	.622	11	30–11	21–20	19–11
x-Los Angeles Clippers	41	41	.500	21	27–14	14–27	15–15
x-Los Angeles Lakers	39	43	.476	23	20–21	19–22	13–17
Golden State Warriors	34	48	.415	28	19–22	15–26	9–21
Sacramento Kings	25	57	.305	37	16–25	9–32	6–24

=== By conference ===
#	Eastern Conference				
#	Team	W	L	PCT	GB
1	c-New York Knicks	60	22	.732	–
2	y-Chicago Bulls	57	25	.695	3
3	x-Cleveland Cavaliers	54	28	.659	6
4	x-Boston Celtics	48	34	.585	12
5	x-Charlotte Hornets	44	38	.537	16
6	x-New Jersey Nets	43	39	.524	17
7	x-Atlanta Hawks	43	39	.524	17
8	x-Indiana Pacers	41	41	.500	19
9	Orlando Magic	41	41	.500	19
10	Detroit Pistons	40	42	.488	20
11	Miami Heat	36	46	.439	24
12	Milwaukee Bucks	28	54	.341	32
13	Philadelphia 76ers	26	56	.317	36
14	Washington Bullets	22	60	.268	38

#	Western Conference				
#	Team	W	L	PCT	GB
1	z-Phoenix Suns	62	20	.756	–
2	y-Houston Rockets	55	27	.671	7
3	x-Seattle SuperSonics	55	27	.671	7
4	x-Portland Trail Blazers	51	31	.622	11
5	x-San Antonio Spurs	49	33	.598	13
6	x-Utah Jazz	47	35	.573	15
7	x-Los Angeles Clippers	41	41	.500	21
8	x-Los Angeles Lakers	39	43	.476	23
9	Denver Nuggets	36	46	.439	26
10	Golden State Warriors	34	48	.415	28
11	Sacramento Kings	25	57	.305	37
12	Minnesota Timberwolves	19	63	.232	43
13	Dallas Mavericks	11	71	.134	51

Notes

- z – Clinched home court advantage for the entire playoffs
- c – Clinched home court advantage for the conference playoffs
- y – Clinched division title
- x – Clinched playoff spot

== Playoffs ==
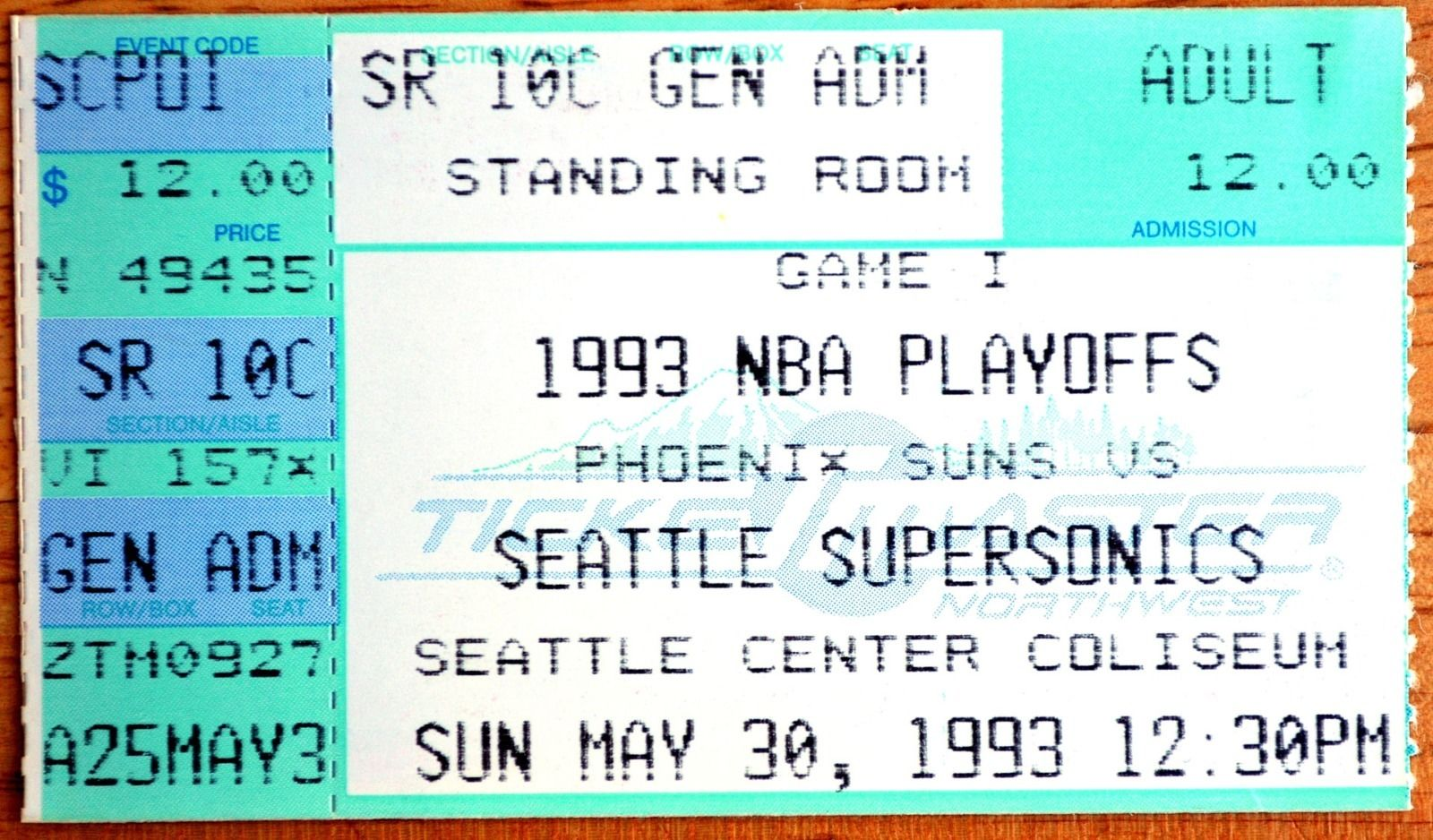
A ticket for Game 4 of the 1993 Western Conference Finals between the Seattle SuperSonics and the Phoenix Suns.

Teams in bold advanced to the next round. The numbers to the left of each team indicate the team's seeding in its conference, and the numbers to the right indicate the number of games the team won in that round. The division champions are marked by an asterisk. Home court advantage does not necessarily belong to the higher-seeded team, but instead the team with the better regular season record; teams enjoying the home advantage are shown in italics.

First round
**E1**	**New York***	**3**
E8	Indiana	1
E4	Boston	1
**E5**	**Charlotte**	**3**
**E3**	**Cleveland**	**3**
E6	New Jersey	2
**E2**	**Chicago***	**3**
E7	Atlanta	0
**W1**	**Phoenix***	**3**
W8	LA Lakers	2
W4	Portland	1
**W5**	**San Antonio**	**3**
**W3**	**Seattle**	**3**
W6	Utah	2
**W2**	**Houston***	**3**
W7	LA Clippers	2

Quarter-finals
**E1**	**New York***	**4**
E5	Charlotte	1
E3	Cleveland	0
**E2**	**Chicago***	**4**
**W1**	**Phoenix***	**4**
W5	San Antonio	2
**W3**	**Seattle**	**4**
W2	Houston*	3

Semi-finals
E1	New York*	2
**E2**	**Chicago***	**4**
**W1**	**Phoenix***	**4**
W3	Seattle	3

Final
**E2**	**Chicago***	**4**
W1	Phoenix*	2

- * Division winner
- **Bold** Series winner
- Italic Team with home-court advantage

== Statistics leaders ==
Category	Player	Team	Stat
Points per game	Michael Jordan	Chicago Bulls	32.6
Rebounds per game	Dennis Rodman	Detroit Pistons	18.3
Assists per game	John Stockton	Utah Jazz	12.0
Steals per game	Michael Jordan	Chicago Bulls	2.83
Blocks per game	Hakeem Olajuwon	Houston Rockets	4.17
FG%	Cedric Ceballos	Phoenix Suns	.576
FT%	Mark Price	Cleveland Cavaliers	.948
3FG%	B. J. Armstrong	Chicago Bulls	.453

== NBA awards ==
=== Yearly awards ===
- Most Valuable Player: Charles Barkley, Phoenix Suns
- Rookie of the Year: Shaquille O'Neal, Orlando Magic
- Defensive Player of the Year: Hakeem Olajuwon, Houston Rockets
- Sixth Man of the Year: Clifford Robinson, Portland Trail Blazers
- Most Improved Player: Mahmoud Abdul-Rauf, Denver Nuggets
- Coach of the Year: Pat Riley, New York Knicks

- All-NBA First Team:
  - F – Karl Malone, Utah Jazz
  - F – Charles Barkley, Phoenix Suns
  - C – Hakeem Olajuwon, Houston Rockets
  - G – Michael Jordan, Chicago Bulls
  - G – Mark Price, Cleveland Cavaliers
- All-NBA Second Team:
  - F – Dominique Wilkins, Atlanta Hawks
  - F – Larry Johnson, Charlotte Hornets
  - C – Patrick Ewing, New York Knicks
  - G – John Stockton, Utah Jazz
  - G – Joe Dumars, Detroit Pistons
- All-NBA Third Team:
  - F – Scottie Pippen, Chicago Bulls
  - F – Derrick Coleman, New Jersey Nets
  - C – David Robinson, San Antonio Spurs
  - G – Tim Hardaway, Golden State Warriors
  - G – Dražen Petrović, New Jersey Nets

- NBA All-Defensive First Team:
  - F – Scottie Pippen, Chicago Bulls
  - F – Dennis Rodman, Detroit Pistons
  - C – Hakeem Olajuwon, Houston Rockets
  - G – Michael Jordan, Chicago Bulls
  - G – Joe Dumars, Detroit Pistons
- NBA All-Defensive Second Team:
  - F – Horace Grant, Chicago Bulls
  - F – Larry Nance, Cleveland Cavaliers
  - C – David Robinson, San Antonio Spurs
  - G – Dan Majerle, Phoenix Suns
  - G – John Starks, New York Knicks

- NBA All-Rookie First Team:
  - Shaquille O'Neal, Orlando Magic
  - Christian Laettner, Minnesota Timberwolves
  - LaPhonso Ellis, Denver Nuggets
  - Alonzo Mourning, Charlotte Hornets
  - Tom Gugliotta, Washington Bullets
- NBA All-Rookie Second Team:
  - Walt Williams, Sacramento Kings
  - Clarence Weatherspoon, Philadelphia 76ers
  - Latrell Sprewell, Golden State Warriors
  - Robert Horry, Houston Rockets
  - Richard Dumas, Phoenix Suns

=== Player of the week ===
The following players were named NBA Player of the Week.

Week	Player
Nov. 6 – Nov. 15	Shaquille O'Neal (Orlando Magic)
Nov. 16 – Nov. 22	Michael Jordan (Chicago Bulls)
Nov. 23 – Nov. 29	David Robinson (San Antonio Spurs)
Nov. 30 – Dec. 6	Dražen Petrović (New Jersey Nets)
Dec. 7 – Dec. 13	Charles Barkley (Phoenix Suns)
Dec. 14 – Dec. 20	Patrick Ewing (New York Knicks)
Dec. 21 – Dec. 27	Sean Elliott (San Antonio Spurs)
Dec. 28 – Jan. 3	David Robinson (San Antonio Spurs)
Jan. 4 – Jan. 10	Shawn Kemp (Seattle SuperSonics)
Jan. 10 – Jan. 17	Hakeem Olajuwon (Houston Rockets)
Jan. 18 – Jan. 24	Patrick Ewing (New York Knicks)
Jan. 25 – Jan. 31	Karl Malone (Utah Jazz)
Feb. 1 – Feb. 7	Nick Anderson (Orlando Magic)
Feb. 8 – Feb. 14	Larry Johnson (Charlotte Hornets)
Feb. 23 – Feb. 28	Hakeem Olajuwon (Houston Rockets)
Mar. 1 – Mar. 7	Rony Seikaly (Miami Heat)
Mar. 8 – Mar. 14	Rumeal Robinson (New Jersey Nets)
Mar. 15 – Mar. 21	Patrick Ewing (New York Knicks)
Mar. 22 – Mar. 28	Dikembe Mutombo (Denver Nuggets)
Mar. 29 – Apr. 4	Charles Barkley (Phoenix Suns)
Apr. 5 – Apr. 11	Hakeem Olajuwon (Houston Rockets)
Apr. 12 – Apr. 18	Alonzo Mourning (Charlotte Hornets)
Apr. 19 – Apr. 25	Larry Johnson (Charlotte Hornets)

=== Player of the month ===
The following players were named NBA Player of the Month.

Month	Player
November	Michael Jordan (Chicago Bulls)
December	Charles Barkley (Phoenix Suns)
January	Hakeem Olajuwon (Houston Rockets)
February	Dominique Wilkins (Atlanta Hawks)
March	Patrick Ewing (New York Knicks)
April	Hakeem Olajuwon (Houston Rockets)

=== Rookie of the month ===
The following players were named NBA Rookie of the Month.

Month	Rookie
November	Shaquille O'Neal (Orlando Magic)
December	Shaquille O'Neal (Orlando Magic)
January	Shaquille O'Neal (Orlando Magic)
February	Shaquille O'Neal (Orlando Magic)
March	Alonzo Mourning (Charlotte Hornets)
April	Alonzo Mourning (Charlotte Hornets)

=== Coach of the month ===
The following coaches were named NBA Coach of the Month.

Month	Coach
November	Mike Dunleavy (Milwaukee Bucks)
December	Paul Westphal (Phoenix Suns)
January	John Lucas (San Antonio Spurs)
February	Lenny Wilkens (Cleveland Cavaliers)
March	Bob Weiss (Atlanta Hawks)
April	Rudy Tomjanovich (Houston Rockets)

== See also ==
- List of NBA regular season records
