= Rex Hughes =

American basketball player and coach (1938–2016)

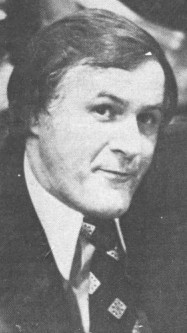
- Hughes in 1975

Biographical details
- Born: September 24, 1938
- Died: May 9, 2016 (aged 77); Nipomo, California, U.S.

Playing career
- 1959–1961: Pepperdine

Coaching career (HC unless noted)
- 1963–1964: North Torrance HS (assistant)
- 1963–1968: Redondo HS
- 1968–1969: Long Beach CC
- 1969–1973: Nebraska (assistant)
- 1973–1974: USC (assistant)
- 1974–1978: Kent State
- 1978–1979: Montana Sky
- 1979–1981: UNLV (assistant)
- 1990–1992: Sacramento Kings (assistant)
- 1991–1992: Sacramento Kings
- 1992–1993: San Antonio Spurs (assistant)
- 1992–1993: San Antonio Spurs
- 1995–1997: Vancouver Grizzlies (assistant)

Accomplishments and honors

Records
- NJCAA 23–5 .821; NCAA: 27–63 .300; NBA: 23–35 .397

Rex Hughes (September 24, 1938 – May 9, 2016) was an American college and professional basketball coach. He coached men's basketball at Long Beach City College, Kent State University, and later served as a National Basketball Association (NBA) assistant coach. He served as head coach for part of a season with the Sacramento Kings, and a single game as an interim coach with the San Antonio Spurs. Hughes also worked in NBA scouting and basketball operations with the Kings, Atlanta Hawks and Orlando Magic. Hughes went to Redondo High School and played college basketball at Pepperdine.

== Head coaching Positions ==
In 1968–1969, Hughes was head coach at Long Beach City College, his first collegiate job after coaching in high school. His squad finished 23–5. When Hughes left to be an assistant at Nebraska, he was replaced by Lute Olson, in his first collegiate job.

Replacing Frank Truitt at Kent State University in 1974, Hughes' teams went 6–20, 12–14 and 8–19 over the next three seasons. The team started 1–10 in 1977–1978, when he was replaced by Mike Boyd.

In 1978–1979, Hughes was head coach and general manager of the Montana Sky (Great Falls, Montana) in the short-lived Western Basketball Association. The Sky were co-owned by country singer Charlie Pride. Notably, Hughes had Cazzie Russell and Brad Davis on the roster. Hughes was hired by the Sky mid-season when Coach Bill Klukas was fired after a 3–17 start. The league folded after one season.

In 1991–1992 Hughes served as an assistant coach under Dick Motta with the Sacramento Kings and went 22–35 in 57 games, replacing Motta as head coach after Motta was fired.

In 1992–1993, Hughes was hired to serve as an assistant coach to Jerry Tarkanian with the San Antonio Spurs. However, just 20 games into the season at 9–11, Tarkanian was fired. Hughes was 1–0 as interim head coach before John Lucas (39–22) was hired.

== Media ==
On March 4, 2009, Hughes became the 15th person in "The Rex Streak", a streak by radio talk show host Jim Rome of consecutive days interviewing someone named Rex.

== Death ==
Hughes died on May 9, 2016, at the age of 77.

== Head coaching record ==
| Team | Year | G | W | L | W–L% | Finish | PG | PW | PL | PW–L% | Result |
|---|---|---|---|---|---|---|---|---|---|---|---|
| Sacramento | 1991–92 | 57 | 22 | 35 | .386 | 7th in Pacific | — | — | — | — | Missed playoffs |
| San Antonio | 1992–93 | 1 | 1 | 0 | 1.000 | (interim) | — | — | — | — | — |
| Career | | 58 | 23 | 35 | .397 | | 0 | 0 | 0 | – | |
