= San Antonio Spurs =

National Basketball Association team in San Antonio

- 2026–27 San Antonio Spurs season
- Conference: Western
- Division: Southwest
- Founded: 1967
- History: Dallas Chaparrals; 1967–1970, 1971–1973 (ABA); Texas Chaparrals; 1970–1971 (ABA); San Antonio Spurs; 1973–1976 (ABA); 1976–present (NBA)
- Arena: Frost Bank Center
- Location: San Antonio, Texas
- Team colors: Silver, black, white
- Main sponsor: Ledger.com
- CEO: R. C. Buford
- President: Gregg Popovich
- General manager: Brian Wright
- Head coach: Mitch Johnson
- Ownership: Spurs Sports & Entertainment (Peter John Holt, Chairman and CEO)
- Affiliation: Austin Spurs
- Championships: 5 (1999, 2003, 2005, 2007, 2014)
- Conference titles: 7 (1999, 2003, 2005, 2007, 2013, 2014, 2026)
- Division titles: 23 (1978, 1979, 1981, 1982, 1983, 1990, 1991, 1995, 1996, 1999, 2001, 2002, 2003, 2005, 2006, 2009, 2011, 2012, 2013, 2014, 2016, 2017, 2026)
- Retired numbers: 11 (00, 6, 9, 12, 13, 20, 21, 32, 44, 50, 1390)
- Website: www.nba.com/spurs
| Association | Icon |

The San Antonio Spurs are an American professional basketball team based in San Antonio. The Spurs compete in the National Basketball Association (NBA) as a member of the Southwest Division of the Western Conference. The team plays its home games at Frost Bank Center. The Spurs are one of four former American Basketball Association (ABA) teams to remain intact in the NBA after the 1976 ABA–NBA merger, one of two former ABA teams to have won an NBA championship (the other being the Denver Nuggets), and the only former ABA team to have won multiple championships.

The franchise has won NBA championships in 1999, 2003, 2005, 2007, and 2014. As of the 2022–23 season, the Spurs had the highest winning percentage among active NBA franchises. As of May 2017, the Spurs had the best winning percentage of any franchise in the major professional sports leagues in the United States and Canada over the previous three decades. From 1999–2000 to 2016–17, the Spurs won 50 games each season, setting a record of 18 consecutive 50-win seasons. In the 2018–19 season, the Spurs matched an NBA record for most consecutive playoff appearances with 22. The team's success has coincided with the tenure of former head coach Gregg Popovich, as well as with the playing careers of Spurs icons David Robinson (1989–2003) and Tim Duncan (1997–2016). In the 2022–23 season, the Spurs celebrated the club's 50th anniversary.

== The Spurs in San Antonio ==
Spurs players are active members of the San Antonio community, and many former Spurs are still active in San Antonio, including David Robinson with the Carver Academy, and George Gervin with the George Gervin Youth Center. The Spurs set several NBA attendance records while playing at the Alamodome including the largest crowd ever for an NBA Finals game in 1999, and the Spurs continue to sell out the smaller Frost Bank Center (formerly SBC Center and AT&T Center) on a regular basis. Since 2003, the team has been forced into an extended road trip for much of February since the Frost Bank Center hosts the San Antonio Stock Show & Rodeo during that month. This is informally known as the "Rodeo Road Trip". The Spurs have consistently posted winning road records during this period, including an NBA-record longest single road-trip winning streak (eight games out of nine, achieved in 2003). When the Spurs have won the NBA title, the team's victory parades have been boat trips on the San Antonio River Walk.

== History ==
=== 1967–1973: Beginnings as the Dallas/Texas Chaparrals ===
The San Antonio Spurs started out as the Dallas Chaparrals of the original version of the American Basketball Association (ABA). Coached by player/coach Cliff Hagan, the Dallas Chaparrals were one of 11 teams to take the floor in the inaugural season of the upstart ABA. The Chaps' second season was a bit of a disappointment, as the team finished in fourth place with a mediocre 41–37 record. In the playoffs, the Chaparrals quickly fell to the New Orleans Buccaneers. The team suffered from poor attendance and general disinterest in Dallas. During the 1970–71 season, the name "Dallas" was dropped in favor of "Texas" and an attempt was made to make the team a regional one, playing games in Fort Worth, at the Tarrant County Convention Center, as well as Lubbock, at the Lubbock Municipal Coliseum, but this proved a failure and the team returned full-time to Dallas in time for the 1971–72 season, splitting their games at Moody Coliseum and Dallas Convention Center Arena.

=== 1973–1976: Moving to San Antonio ===
While the Chaparrals had been modestly successful on the court, they were sinking financially by their third season. The financial difficulties were largely caused by the ownership group's refusal to invest much money on the team. After missing the playoffs for the first time in their existence in the 1972–73 season, nearly all of the owners wanted out. The team decided to sell the team to a different city, and the Chaparrals had to choose between San Antonio and El Paso. A group of 35 San Antonio businessmen—led by Angelo Drossos, John Schaefer, and Red McCombs—worked out a "lend-lease" deal with the Dallas ownership group. Drossos and his group would lease the team for three years with an option to purchase. Frost Bank's then-president and CEO Tom C. Frost provided the financing necessary to transition the Spurs to San Antonio.

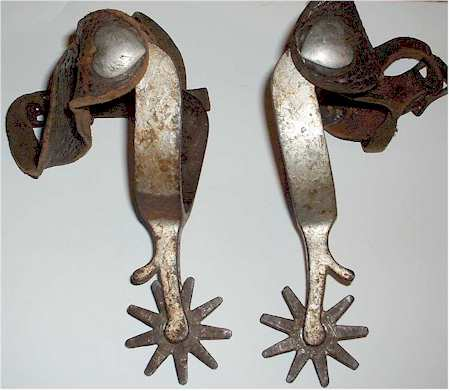
The team's name derives from a spur, a metal tool designed to be worn on the heels of cowboy boots for the purpose of controlling a horse's movement and direction.

After the deal was signed, the team was renamed the San Antonio Gunslingers. Before they played a game under that name, the team name was changed to the Spurs. It is debated whether the name related to a winning entry in a local "Name That Team" contest, or if it related to one of the team owners being born in Spur, Texas. In any case, the team's primary colors were changed from the red, white, and blue of the Chaparrals to the now-familiar black, silver and white motif of the Spurs, with the branding taking effect for the 1973–74 season. In their first game at HemisFair Arena, the Spurs lost to the San Diego Conquistadors despite attracting a crowd of 6,000 fans. A smothering defense was the team's trademark, as they held opponents to less than 100 points in an ABA-record 49 games. The early Spurs were led by ABA veteran James Silas, and the team grew stronger by acquiring Swen Nater (who would go on to win the Rookie of the Year award) and George Gervin from the Virginia Squires in January. The ABA tried to halt the Gervin deal, claiming it was detrimental to the league; however, a judge ruled in the Spurs' favor and Gervin made his Spurs debut on February 7, 1974. The Spurs finished their inaugural season under that banner with a 45–39 record, good for third place in the Western Division. In the playoffs, the team was defeated by the Indiana Pacers in seven games in the first round. San Antonio embraced the Spurs with open arms; the Spurs drew 6,303 fans per game, surpassing the Chaparrals' entire total attendance in only 18 games. Drossos, Schaefer and McCombs knew a runaway hit when they saw it. After only one year, they exercised their option to tear up the lease agreement, buy the franchise outright and keep the team in San Antonio for good.

The team quickly made themselves at home at HemisFair Arena, playing to increasingly large and raucous crowds. Despite a respectable 17–10 start during the 1974–75 season, Coach Tom Nissalke was fired as the team's ownership become tired of the Spurs' slow playing style. He was replaced by Bob Bass, who said, "It is my belief that you cannot throw a set offense at another professional team for 48 minutes. You've got to let them play some schoolyard basketball." Gervin and Silas took that style to heart, as the Spurs became an exciting fast-break team. The team finished the season with a 51–33 record and finished in second place in the West. In the playoffs, the Spurs fell to the Pacers in six games.

Even though playoff success would elude the team before the merger, the Spurs had suddenly found themselves among the best teams in the ABA. Moreover, their gaudy attendance figures made them very attractive to the NBA, even though San Antonio, then as now, was a medium-sized market. Although San Antonio proper had over 650,000 people at the time (and has since grown to become the seventh-largest city in the United States), the surrounding suburban and rural areas have never been much larger than the city itself. In June 1976, the ABA–NBA merger took place, moving San Antonio's sole professional sports franchise into a new league. The Spurs, the Denver Nuggets, the Indiana Pacers, and the New York Nets joined the NBA for the 1976–77 season. The Spurs and the other three ABA teams added in the merger agreed to pay the owners of two other strong ABA teams that folded instead of joining the NBA (a third ABA team, the Virginia Squires, had survived their final regular season of play, but folded operations a month before merger talks began). John Y. Brown, Jr., the owner of the Kentucky Colonels, received $3 million, which he used to purchase the NBA's Buffalo Braves and later the Boston Celtics, after selling star guard Louie Dampier to the Spurs. The owners of the Spirits of St. Louis received a portion of all television profits during their NBA tenure, which amounted to approximately one-seventh of the Spurs' television profit every year. This agreement placed particular financial pressure on the Spurs and the other three surviving former ABA teams. In 2014, 38 years after the completion of the merger, the Spirits' owners reached an agreement with the NBA to end the perpetual payments and take a lump sum of $500 million instead.

=== 1976–1985: The George Gervin era ===
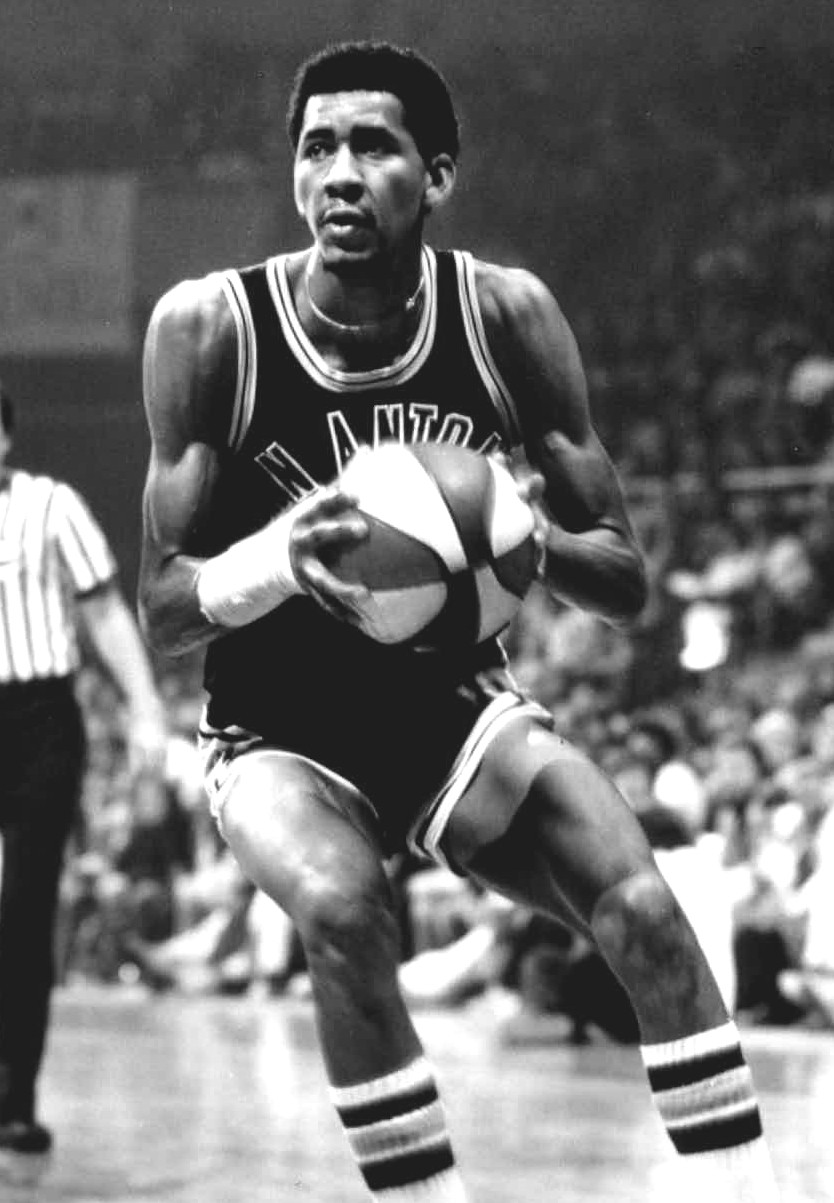
George Gervin served as a foundation piece for the Spurs for almost a decade between 1976 and 1985

Although there was some initial skepticism in league circles regarding the potential success and talent levels of the incoming ABA teams, the Spurs would prove worthy of NBA inclusion during the 1976–77 season with a record of 44–38, good for a tie for fourth place overall in the Eastern Conference. This was done in spite of significant handicaps the NBA imposed on the incoming ABA teams, limiting their draft picks and television revenues during their early time in the merged league. They gained a new rival in the form of the Houston Rockets, who had played in Texas for five years prior to the merger.

During the 1977–78 season, Gervin battled David Thompson of the Denver Nuggets all year long for the NBA scoring title. On the final day of the season, Thompson took the lead by scoring 73 points in an afternoon game against the Detroit Pistons. That night Gervin knew that he needed 58 points against the Jazz in New Orleans. Gervin got off to a good start by scoring 20 points in the first quarter. In the second, Gervin set a single period record with 33 points. Early on in the third period, Gervin scored his 58 points on the way to 63 capturing the scoring title. While Gervin was lighting up the scoreboard, the Spurs were winning the Central Division with a 52–30 record.

However, in the playoffs, the Spurs would be stunned in six games by the Washington Bullets despite an outstanding series from Gervin who averaged 33.2 points per game. The following season in the 1979 conference finals the Spurs led the series 3–1 but the Bullets came back to win the last three games and came from behind to win the seventh game 107–105 handing the Spurs a heartbreaking loss. The Spurs would have to wait another 20 years to make it to their first NBA Finals. The Spurs would go on to capture five division titles in their first seven years in the NBA and became a perennial playoff participant. However, in the playoffs, the Spurs could never catch a break, losing to teams like the Washington Bullets, the Boston Celtics, the Houston Rockets, and the Los Angeles Lakers.

As the 1980s progressed, the Spurs would see their shares of highs and lows. For the first few seasons of the decade, the Spurs continued their success of the 1970s with records of 52–30 in 1980–81 (in that season, the Spurs were moved to the Midwest Division of the Western Conference), 48–34 in 1981–82, and 53–29 in 1982–83. Despite their regular season success, the Spurs were unable to win any NBA championships, losing in the Western Conference playoffs to the Houston Rockets in the first round of the 1981 and the Los Angeles Lakers in four games in 1982 and in six games in the 1983 conference finals despite getting both wins at the Forum in the 1983 series. They lost every home game in both series in 1982 and 1983 vs the Lakers as Magic Johnson, Kareem Abdul-Jabbar and co. were too strong. The Spurs did not make the conference finals again until 1995. After the 1984–85 season, Gervin, who had been the Spurs' biggest star, was traded to the Chicago Bulls in what effectively signaled the end of the era that began when the Spurs first moved to San Antonio.

=== 1985–1989: Difficult years ===
The next four seasons were a dark time for the Spurs, who went 115–213 from 1985–86 to 1988–89. The losing seasons and dwindling attendance often caused the Spurs to be mentioned as a potential candidate for relocation to another city. The lone bright spot during this period was the Spurs being awarded the top pick in the 1987 NBA draft through NBA draft lottery. The Spurs used this selection on United States Naval Academy standout David Robinson. Although Robinson was drafted in 1987, the Spurs would have to wait until the 1989–90 season for Robinson to be a Spur because of his two-year commitment to serve in the United States Navy. The Spurs bottomed out in 1988–89 with a record of 21–61, the worst in franchise history at the time. But the 1989–90 season brought full ownership by Red McCombs, as an original investor in the team had helped solidify local ownership for the team. It also saw the debut of head coach Larry Brown, who had won the NCAA National Championship as head coach of Kansas in 1988.

=== 1989–1997: The David Robinson era ===
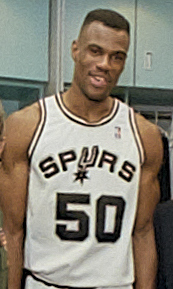
David Robinson was named NBA Most Valuable Player in 1995 and later helped the Spurs win its first NBA championship in 1999.

Despite speculation that Robinson might become a free agent instead of signing with the Spurs, he decided to come to San Antonio for the 1989–90 season. His rookie season exceeded all expectations. Led by Robinson, 1989 draftee Sean Elliott from Arizona, and trade acquisition Terry Cummings from the Milwaukee Bucks, the Spurs achieved the biggest one-season turnaround in NBA history. Their record of 56–26 took them from the worst record in franchise history to the best in franchise history and their first division title in seven years. Robinson had one of the most successful rookie seasons for a center in NBA history, finishing the season as the unanimous Rookie of the Year while averaging 24.3 points and 12.0 rebounds.

The Spurs began the 1990s with great optimism. The team became a perennial playoff presence, although unable to advance further than the second round of the NBA playoffs under Brown's tutelage. Midway through the 1991–92 season, McCombs fired Brown and replaced him with Bob Bass for the remainder of the season. Without a healthy David Robinson, the Spurs were swept out of the first round of the playoffs by the Phoenix Suns. McCombs made national headlines during the summer of 1992 with the hiring of former UNLV head coach Jerry Tarkanian. The Tarkanian experiment proved a flop, as the coach was fired 20 games into the 1992–93 season with the Spurs record at 9–11. After Rex Hughes filled the coaching shoes for one game, NBA veteran John Lucas was named head coach. It was Lucas' first NBA coaching assignment, although he had gained recognition in league circles for his success in helping NBA players rehab from drug abuse. The Lucas era started out successfully. His coaching propelled the team to a 39–22 finish over the rest of the regular season, and the team reached the Western Conference semifinals.

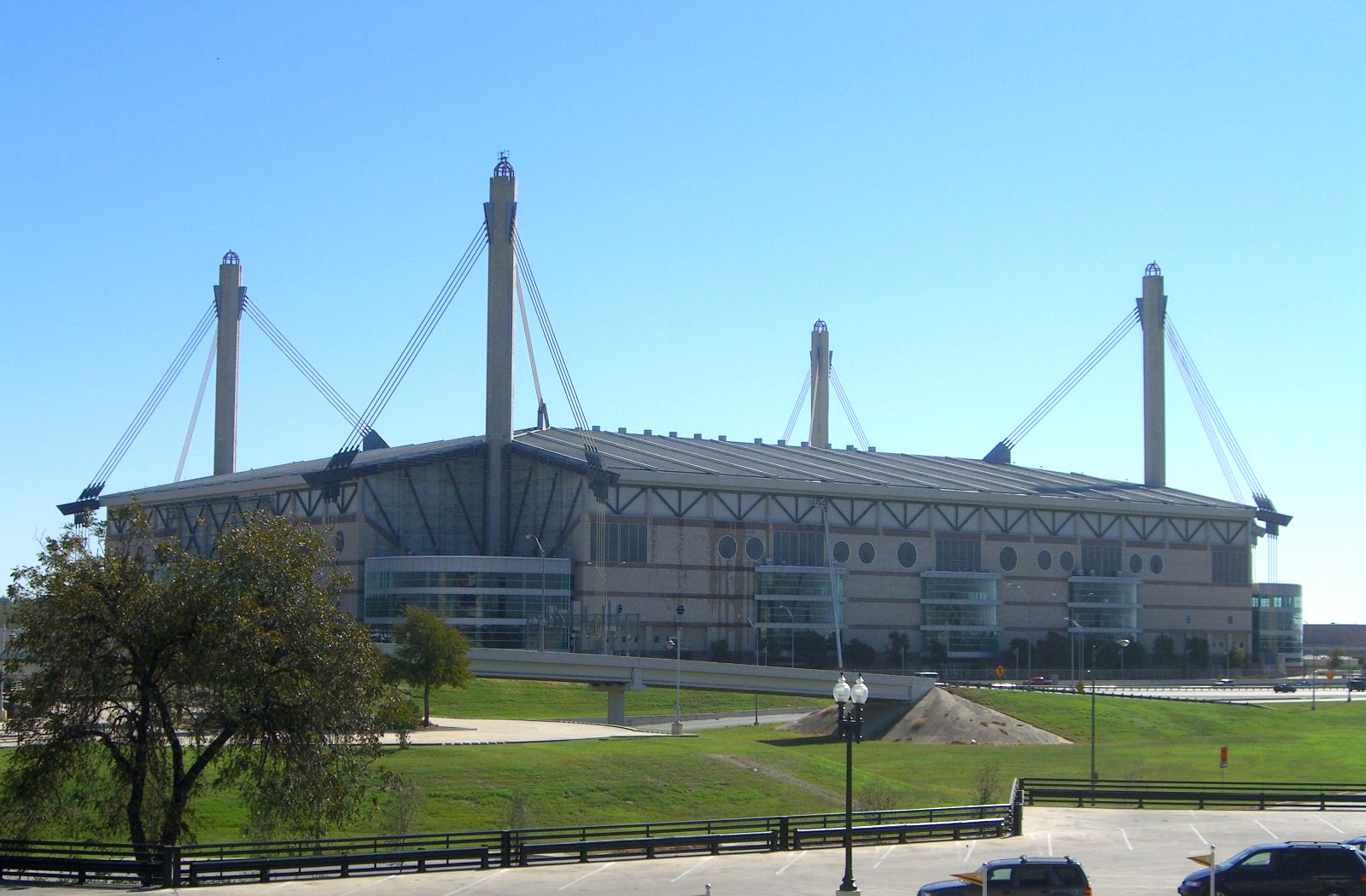
The Alamodome, home to the Spurs from 1993 to 2002

In 1993, local businessman Peter M. Holt and a group of 22 investors purchased the Spurs from Red McCombs for $75 million. In the 1993–94 season, the Spurs' first in the newly built Alamodome, Lucas led the team to a 55–27 record but the team suffered a loss in the first round of the playoffs, which led to the immediate firing of Lucas as head coach. Prior to the season, the Spurs traded fan-favorite Elliott to the Detroit Pistons in return for rebounding star Dennis Rodman. Elliott returned to the Spurs at the following year. Lucas was replaced by former Pacers coach Bob Hill for the 1994–95 season. On their first game of the season, they were defeated by the visiting Golden State Warriors despite a strong performance by David Robinson who recorded 27 points, 16 rebounds, 6 assists and 5 blocks for the Spurs. The next game, Sean Elliott recorded 23 points and David Robinson added 18 points and 19 rebounds as the Spurs got their first win of the season against the visiting New Jersey Nets.

The Spurs finished with the NBA's best record at 62–20, cracking the 60-win mark for the first time in franchise history. Robinson was named the league's Most Valuable Player. The Spurs reached the Western Conference finals, but lost to the eventual NBA Champion Houston Rockets. Throughout the season, and particularly in the playoffs, there appeared to be friction developing between Rodman and several Spurs' teammates, most notably Robinson. Rodman was traded to the Chicago Bulls after the season, and helped the Bulls win three titles from 1996 to 1998. Rodman was named All-NBA Third Team for the Spurs that season.

The Spurs finished the 1995–96 season under Hill at 59–23 and lost in the Western Conference semifinals. Few observers could have predicted how far the Spurs would fall during the 1996–97 season, especially with the signing of Dominique Wilkins. Robinson missed the first month of the season due to a back injury. He returned in December, but played only six games before a broken foot sidelined him for the rest of the season. Elliott also missed more than half the season due to injury. Forward Chuck Person would miss the entire season with a back injury. Without Robinson and Elliott, the Spurs were a rudderless team. The lone bright spot was Wilkins, leading the team in scoring with an average of 18.2 points per game. The Spurs ended the season with a 20–62 record, the worst in franchise history—and the last time they missed the playoffs until the 2019–20 season. Hill only lasted 18 games as coach that season, eventually being fired and replaced by general manager Gregg Popovich, who had also served a stint under Brown as an assistant coach. Wilkins would play his lone season in 1996–97 for San Antonio, knowing his minutes and playing time would greatly diminish next season. As disastrous as the 1996–97 season was for the Spurs, the off-season proved to be the opposite. With the third-worst record in the league, the Spurs won the NBA draft lottery, which gave them the top pick in the 1997 draft. The Spurs used their pick to select Wake Forest product and consensus All-American Tim Duncan.

=== 1997–2016: The Tim Duncan era ===
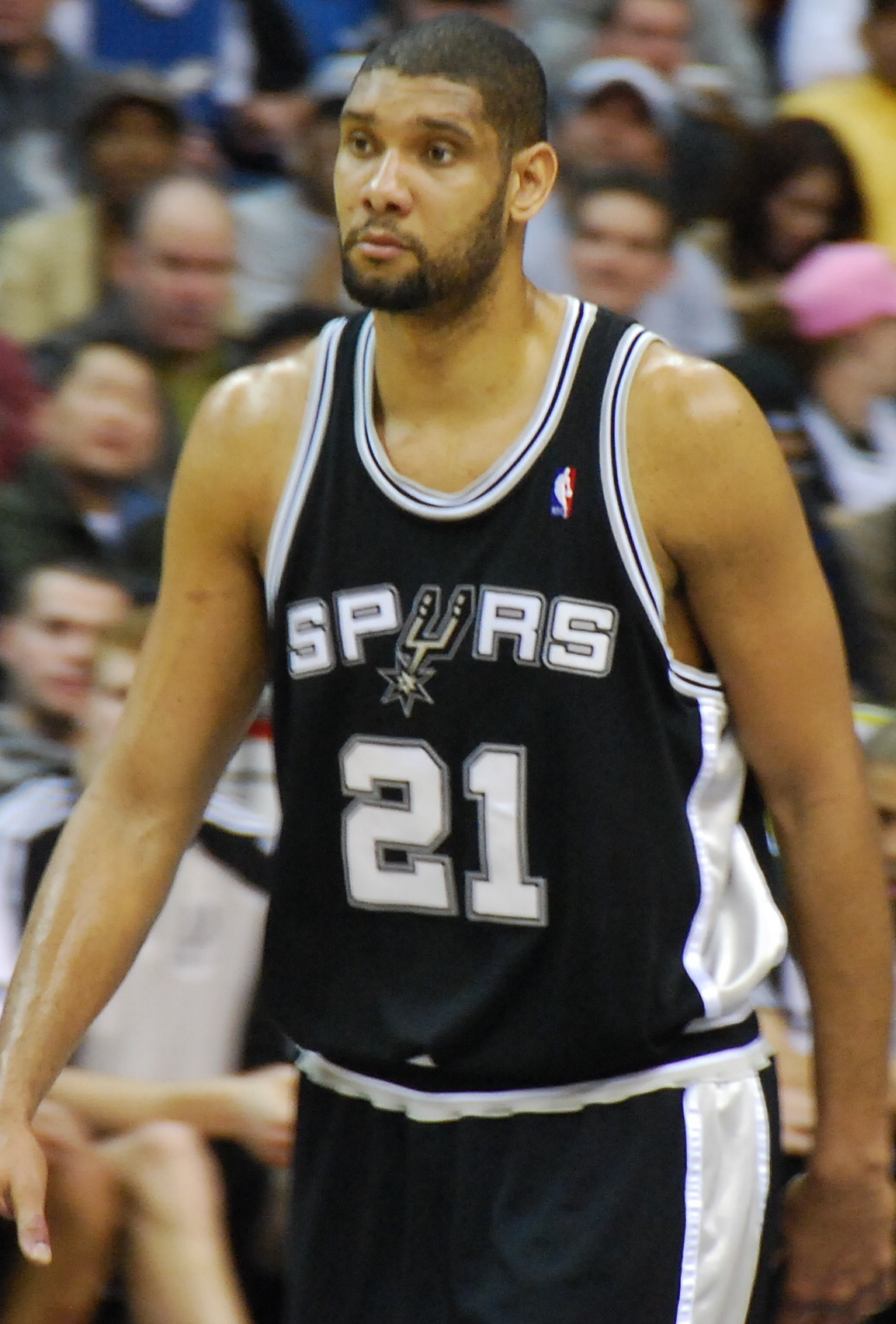
The drafting of Tim Duncan in 1997 was a turning point in the history of the Spurs.

==== 1997–2003: The "Twin Towers" ====
The 7 ft 1 in (2.16 m) Robinson and the 6 ft 11 in (2.11 m) Duncan—quickly dubbed the Twin Towers—would play together for the Spurs from 1997 to 2003. Skilled offensive players who also anchored the Spurs' formidable defense, the duo would help lead the team to NBA championships in 1999 and 2003.

Duncan quickly emerged as a dominant force in the NBA during the 1997–98 season, averaging 21.1 points and 11.9 rebounds per game as a power forward. He was named First Team All-NBA while winning Rookie of the Year honors. The team ended up at 56–26, breaking their own record from 1989 to 1990 for the biggest single-season improvement for wins, but once again lost to the Jazz in the Western Conference semifinals. While both Duncan and Robinson played low-post roles, the two seamlessly meshed on the court. With a healthy Robinson and Duncan and the additions of playoff veterans such as Mario Elie and Jerome Kersey, the Spurs looked forward to the 1998–99 season. Before training camps, the NBA owners, led by commissioner David Stern, locked out the players in order to force a new collective bargaining agreement with the National Basketball Players Association (NBPA). The season was delayed for more than three months until a new labor agreement was reached in January 1999.

Playing a shortened 50-game season, the Spurs won their first two games of the season, against the Sacramento Kings and the Minnesota Timberwolves respectively. However, the Spurs lost their next three games to the Lakers, Timberwolves, and Cavaliers, the latter a 99–89 road loss. The Spurs finished the regular season with an NBA-best 37–13 record (.740 win percentage), the only season during Duncan's tenure with the Spurs that the team did not win at least 50 games in a season (.610 win percentage in an 82-game season), a feat that extended through the 2016–17 season. The team was just as dominant in the playoffs, rolling through the Western Conference with a record of 11–1. In the NBA Finals, they faced the New York Knicks, who had made history by becoming the first eighth seed to ever make the NBA Finals. The Spurs won the series 4-1 and the franchise's first NBA championship in game five at the Knicks' home arena, Madison Square Garden. Duncan was named the NBA Finals MVP. The Spurs became the first former ABA team to reach and win the NBA Finals.

Coming off their first NBA championship, the Spurs were among the best teams in the West and battling for first place in the Midwest Division during the 1999–2000 season. On March 14, the Spurs playoff spirits got a lift when Sean Elliott, who received a kidney transplant from his brother before the season, returned and played in the last 19 games. As the season wound down, Duncan suffered a knee injury. The Spurs finished in second place with a 53–29 record and were knocked out of the playoffs by the Phoenix Suns in four games. The long-term viability of the Spurs franchise in San Antonio was, however, achieved during the 1999–2000 season, as Bexar County voters approved increases in car rental and hotel taxes that would finance the construction of a new arena next to the Freeman Coliseum. The Spurs finished 58–24 in the 2000–01 and 2001–02 seasons but were ousted from both playoffs—swept in the 2001 conference finals and losing in five games during the second round in 2002—by the eventual NBA champion Los Angeles Lakers.

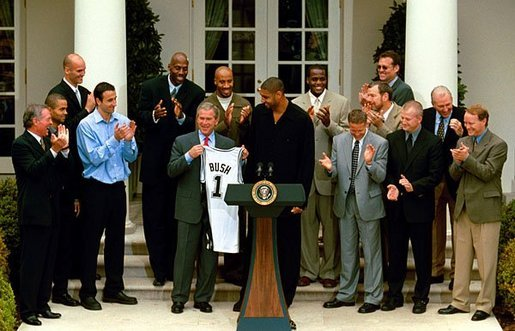
The Spurs visit the White House after their championship in 2003.

Entering the 2002–03 season, the team knew it would be memorable for at least two reasons, as David Robinson announced that it would be his last in the NBA and the Spurs would begin play at their new arena, the SBC Center, named after telecommunications giant SBC, whose corporate headquarters were in San Antonio (SBC became AT&T after it acquired its former parent company). To mark this occasion, the Spurs revamped their "Fiesta Colors" logo and reverted to the familiar silver and black motif (though, during the time of the Fiesta logo, the uniform remained silver and black). This version of the Spurs was different from the team that had won the title a few years earlier. Second-year French star Tony Parker, drafted by the Spurs in the first round of the 2001 NBA draft, was now the starting point guard for the Spurs. The squad featured a variety of newly acquired three-point shooters, including Stephen Jackson, Danny Ferry, Bruce Bowen, Steve Kerr, Steve Smith and Argentine product Manu Ginóbili, a 1999 second-round draft choice playing in his first NBA season.

The Spurs started the 2002–03 season with an 87–81 road win over the defending champions, the Los Angeles Lakers. The following game, the Spurs bowed down to the home team, the Golden State Warriors, 106–98. The Spurs christened the SBC Center in style on November 1, 2002, by defeating the Toronto Raptors 91–72. The next game, the Spurs were on the road to face the winless Memphis Grizzlies. In that game, the Spurs and the Grizzlies went to overtime. In the first minutes of the OT, the Grizzlies held a 7-point lead before Tim Duncan answered the run with a 9-point run by himself. With a tied score of 111–111 with 0.8 seconds remaining, Duncan made a 12-foot jumpshot to defeat the Grizzlies. The following game, the Spurs were down by three points at halftime against the visiting Warriors, but then scored 31 points in the third quarter to put the game away, clinching their fourth win of the season. Tony Parker led the Spurs after scoring 21 points. Three days after, the Spurs were dealt by the visiting Trail Blazers their first home loss of the season. The Spurs would not get off to a flying start as they had just a 19–13 record heading into January. In January, the Spurs began to gel and seemed prepped to make a run, when they embarked on their annual Rodeo Road Trip, a nine-game road trip from January 25 to February 16; however, it would be hardly a bump in the road for the charging Spurs, who won eight of the nine and began to climb their way to first place. The Spurs went on to erase their seven-game deficit and finished the season in a tie with the Dallas Mavericks for the best record in the NBA (60–22). Thanks to a tiebreaker, the Spurs won their third straight Division title as Tim Duncan claimed his second straight NBA MVP. In the playoffs, the Spurs defeated the Suns, Lakers and Mavericks en route to facing the New Jersey Nets in the NBA Finals. The series against the Nets marked the first time two former ABA teams played each other for the NBA championship. The Spurs won the series 4–2, giving them their second NBA championship in franchise history. Duncan, after having been named NBA MVP, was also named Finals MVP.

==== 2003–2011: The "Big Three" ====
"Big Three"

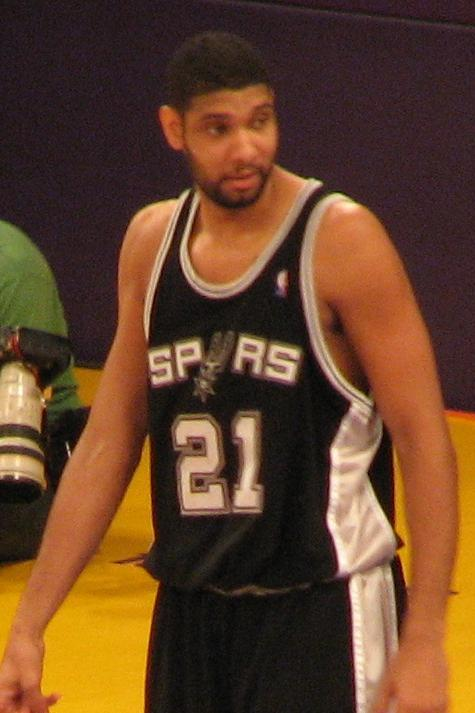
Tim Duncan

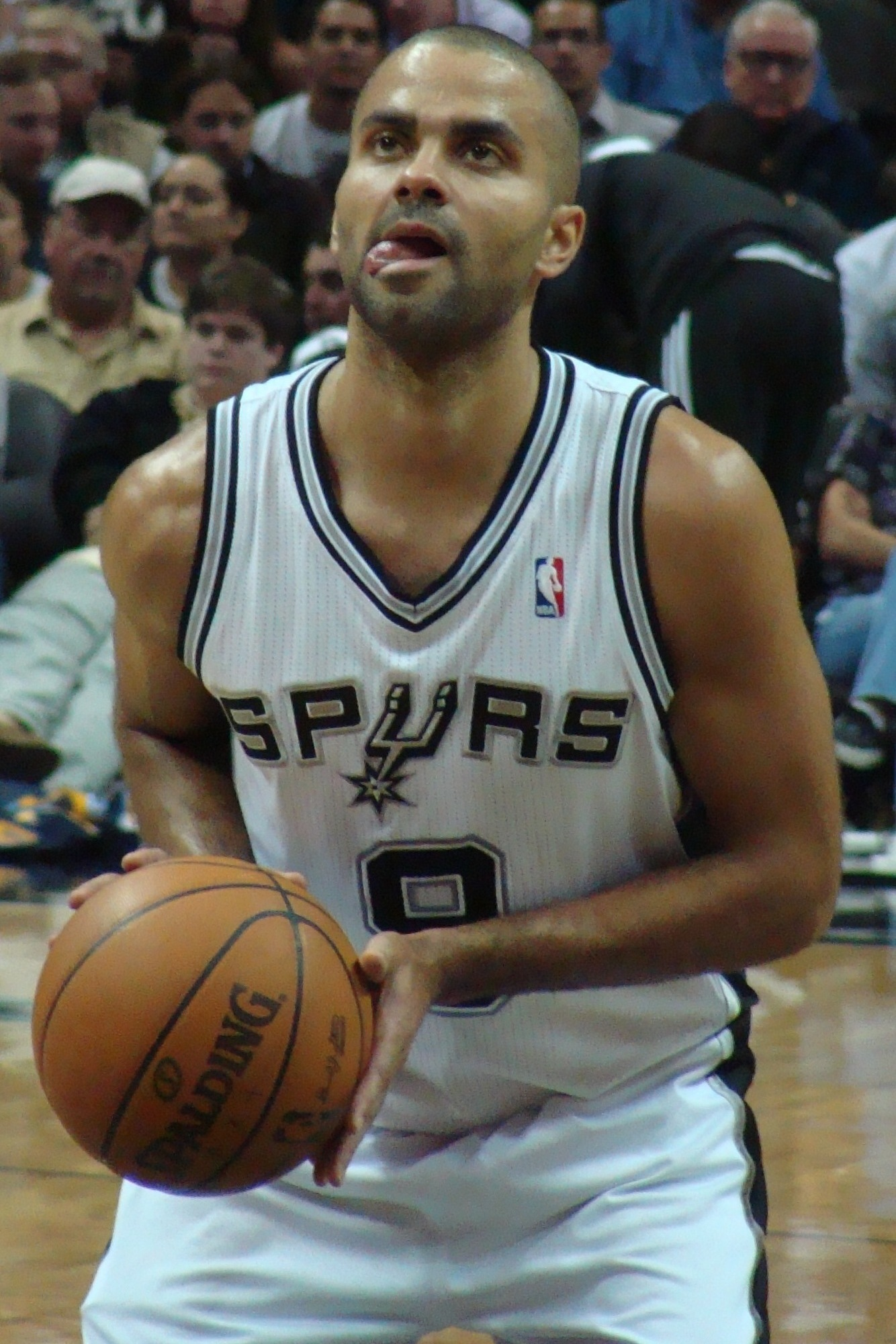
Tony Parker

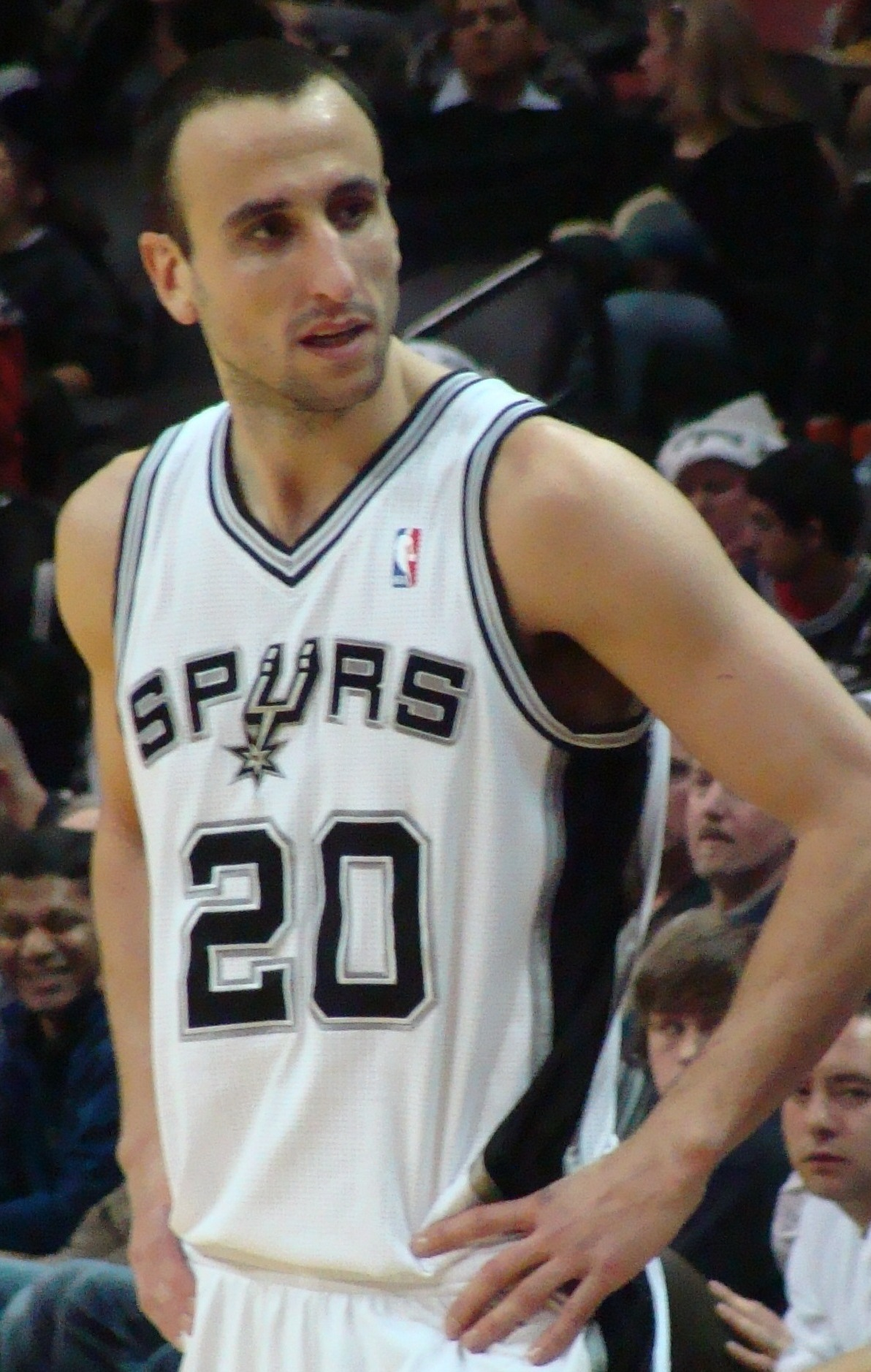
Manu Ginóbili

Coming off their second NBA Championship, the retirement of David Robinson left a void in San Antonio's daunting defense. Meanwhile, backup point guard Speedy Claxton left for the Golden State Warriors, and Stephen Jackson left for the Atlanta Hawks. With several holes to fill in their rotation, the Spurs would make several key signings in the off-season. Rasho Nesterović and Hedo Türkoğlu were brought in to replace Robinson and Jackson, respectively. What proved to be the most important off-season acquisition would be the signing of veteran Robert Horry.

The Spurs, playing with nine new players, struggled early as they missed the presence of Robinson while the new players struggled to fit in, as they held a 9–10 record on December 3. However, the Spurs would turn it around, as they ended December on a 13-game winning streak and quickly climbed back to the top of the NBA standings. They would battle all year for the top spot in the Western Conference, as they ended the season on another strong note winning their final 11 games. However, they would fall one game short of a division title and the best record in the West, posting a record of 57–25. In the second round of the playoffs, the Spurs found themselves in another showdown with the Los Angeles Lakers. The Spurs would win games 1 and 2 at home, but drop the next two in Los Angeles. In game five back in San Antonio, Duncan seemingly delivered the Spurs a 73–72 win as he hit a dramatic shot with just 0.4 seconds remaining. However, the Lakers' Derek Fisher would launch a game-winner as time expired, giving the Lakers a stunning 74–73 win to take a 3–2 series lead. Demoralized the Spurs would head back to Los Angeles where they would lose the series in six games.

After their disappointing second-round collapse, the Spurs looked to regain the NBA crown. With the acquisition of guard Brent Barry from Seattle, the Spurs would get off to a quick start, posting a 12–3 record in November. The Spurs would stay hot through December as they established a 25–6 record entering the New Year. With the later additions of center Nazr Mohammed from New York (acquired in a midseason trade of Malik Rose), and veteran forward Glenn Robinson from free agency, alongside regulars Bruce Bowen, Robert Horry, Tony Parker, Manu Ginóbili, and Tim Duncan, the Spurs would be near the top in the Western Conference all season, battling the Phoenix Suns for the best record in the NBA. Just as it appeared the Spurs would cruise toward the playoffs their season suddenly hit a bump in the road when Tim Duncan suffered an ankle injury. The Spurs struggled the rest of the season, finishing just 59–23. However, by the time the playoffs rolled around, Duncan was ready to return.

In the postseason, The Spurs went through the West relatively easily, culminating with a five-game victory in the conference finals over the Phoenix Suns. In the NBA Finals, the Spurs would face the defending champion Detroit Pistons. The first two games in San Antonio were both Spurs' victories as Ginóbili led the way with 26 and 27 points respectively. However, as the series shifted to Detroit, the Spurs lost games 3 and 4 by big margins as the Pistons tied the series. Faced with a third straight loss in Detroit, the Spurs would play tougher in game five, which would go into overtime. After going scoreless in the first half, Robert Horry hit a clutch three-point shot with nine seconds remaining to give the Spurs a dramatic 96–95 win. The series moved back to San Antonio for game six, but the Spurs were unable to close out the series, setting up a deciding game seven in which Duncan had 25 points as the Spurs pulled away late to win their third NBA title in seven years with an 81–74 win. Duncan was named Finals MVP, becoming the fourth player to win the MVP award three times (joining Magic Johnson, Shaquille O'Neal, and Michael Jordan).

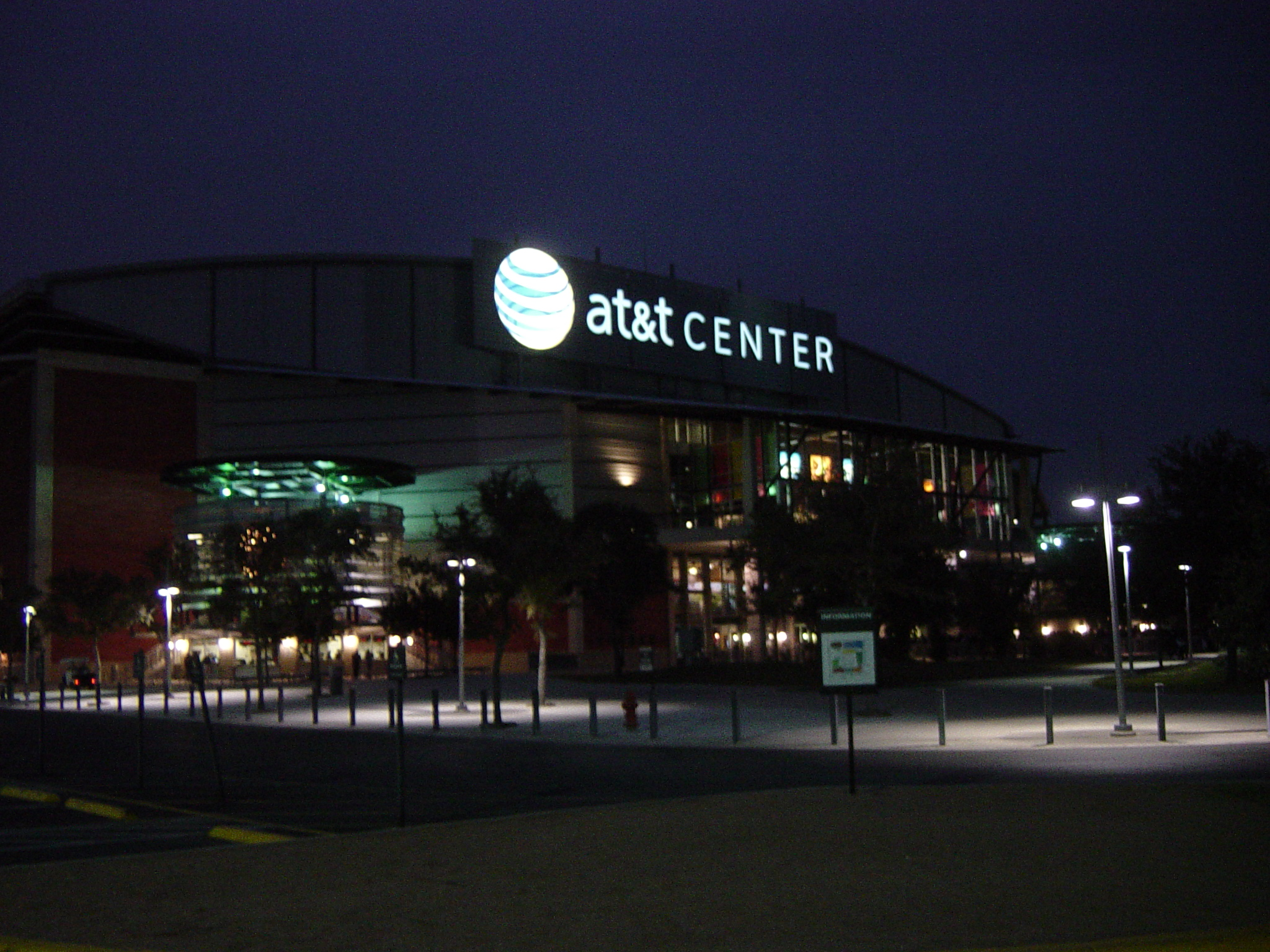
Frost Bank Center (then-AT&T Center), the home of the Spurs, at night in 2006

Coming off their third NBA Championship in seven years, there was a sense that the Spurs were the class of the NBA, and once again would be the team to beat in the NBA for the Championship. For the 2005–06 season, the Spurs acquired the two-time All-Star Michael Finley and one-time All Star Nick Van Exel. Not surprisingly, the Spurs would come flying out of the gate, winning 16 of their first 19 games. Once again, the Spurs would get challenged within their own division by the Dallas Mavericks as they held the two best records in the Western Conference all season, battling for first place. In the end, the experience of the Spurs would be the difference as they won the Southwest Division again with a new franchise-best record of 63–19. The Spurs met the Mavericks in the second round of the playoffs, but it would be Dallas coming out on top 4–3, including a 119–111 overtime victory in game seven.

The Spurs struggled during the first half of the 2006–07 season, which led to discussions of trading away veteran players to build for the future. The team remained intact, and the Spurs would win 13 games in a row during February and March, and were an NBA-best 25–6 in the final 31 games, as the Spurs were able to claim the 3-seed in the West. The Spurs cruised through the first round, while the first-seeded Dallas Mavericks were upset. This set up a second-round series with the Phoenix Suns as the key series in the entire NBA playoffs, as this series featured the teams with the two best records remaining in the NBA.

The Spurs went on to win 4–2 in the contentious and controversial series versus the Suns. The series featured a Robert Horry foul on Steve Nash toward the end of game four which resulted in Horry being suspended for two games. Those who said the second-round series against the Suns was the true NBA Finals would be proven right, as the Spurs easily dispatched the Utah Jazz in five games to reach the NBA Finals. In the Finals, the Spurs swept the Cleveland Cavaliers and captured their fourth title in nine years. Tony Parker, who dominated in the Finals averaging 24.5 points per game on 57 percent shooting, was named Finals MVP and became the first European-born player to win the award.

The 2007–2008 season saw the Spurs go 56–26 and finish third in the Western Conference. The Spurs faced hurdles but would make it to the Western Conference finals, but lose to the Lakers in five games. The next season would see the Spurs drop off in wins to 54–28 and lose to the Dallas Mavericks in the first round of the playoffs. Two days before the 2009 NBA draft, general manager R. C. Buford acted to address the team's age and health concerns by acquiring 29-year-old swingman Richard Jefferson from the Milwaukee Bucks. The Spurs sent 38-year-old Bruce Bowen, 36-year-old Kurt Thomas, and 34-year-old Fabricio Oberto to the Bucks, who swapped Oberto to the Detroit Pistons for Amir Johnson. The Spurs held three picks in the second round in the 2009 draft. Their selection of Pittsburgh Panthers forward DeJuan Blair with the 37th pick was described as a "steal" by analysts; the Spurs later drafted two guards they had been targeting with the No. 37 pick, taking Miami Hurricanes shooting guard Jack McClinton and point/shooting guard Nando de Colo from France with the No. 51 and No. 53 picks, respectively. On July 10, 2009, the Spurs signed Detroit Pistons power forward Antonio McDyess to a three-year deal worth approximately $15 million in guaranteed money.

The Spurs struggled with injuries during the 2009–10 regular season, but managed another 50-win season, finishing at 50–32. The seventh-seeded Spurs would once again battle the Mavericks in the first round of the playoffs. After falling to the Mavericks in game one, the Spurs went on to avenge their 2009 defeat to Dallas by winning the series in six games. The Spurs, however, were swept out of the playoffs in the following round by the Phoenix Suns. During the 2010 NBA draft, the Spurs management held the highest draft pick since the Tim Duncan draft a decade earlier. They drafted rookie James Anderson from Oklahoma State with the 20th overall pick. However, Anderson was soon sitting out of the first half of the season due to injuries. In 2010–11, the Spurs finished 61–21 to be the first seed, but an injury to Ginóbili in the final regular season game took a toll on the team, and they were upset by the eighth-seeded Memphis Grizzlies.

==== 2011–2016: Arrival of Kawhi Leonard ====
In 2011, a change to the Spurs' philosophy set the stage for the next successful run in the club's history. Out went the stream of last-legs, wizened veterans that the Spurs had relied on to fill out the rotation behind the Big Three. Minutes went to younger and more athletic talent like Danny Green, Gary Neal, and Tiago Splitter, to whom Popovich would teach The Spurs' Way – a fast pace, unselfish passing, and accountability on defense. The biggest personnel move of the Spurs' off-season had the team sending guard George Hill to his hometown Indiana Pacers for San Diego State's Kawhi Leonard, a hyper-athletic forward selected 15th overall by the Pacers in the 2011 NBA draft. The team also selected Texas Longhorns' Cory Joseph as the 29th overall pick.

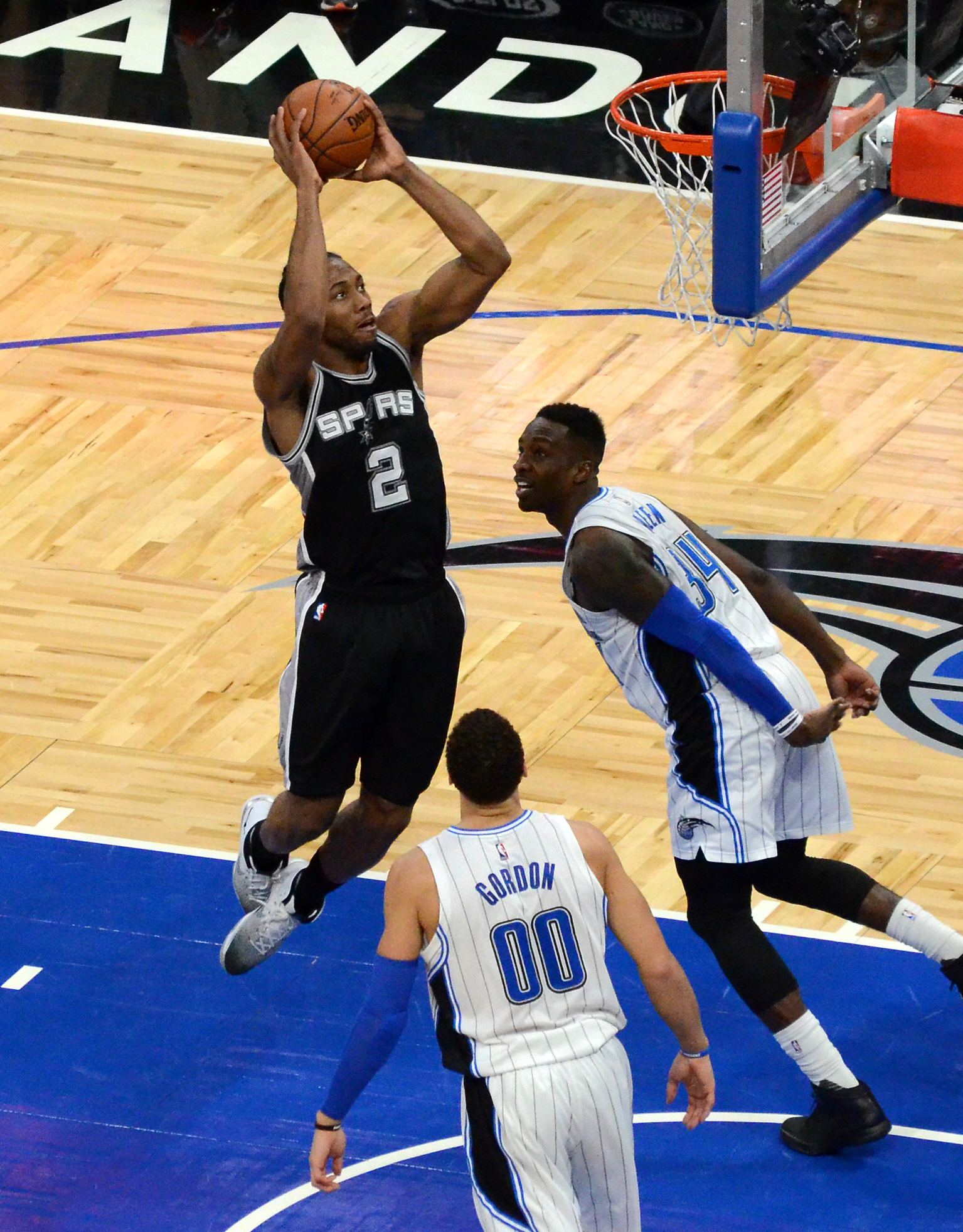
Kawhi Leonard was acquired by the Spurs in 2011.

After the lockout that delayed the 2011–12 season, the Spurs signed T. J. Ford, who would eventually retire in the middle of the season after playing only 14 games due to a stinger. Before the trade deadline, the Spurs decided to part ways with Richard Jefferson and sent him to the Golden State Warriors for Stephen Jackson, who had been a member of the 2002–03 championship team. Leonard then became the starting small forward. In the week following the trade deadline, the Spurs also signed forward Boris Diaw after his contract was bought out by the Charlotte Bobcats, and former Portland Trail Blazers guard Patrick Mills who played for the Xinjiang Flying Tigers in the CBA during the lockout. This gave the Spurs a deeper bench for their playoff run.

Despite the shortened 66-game NBA season due to the NBA lockout, the Spurs won 50 games and tied the Chicago Bulls for the best record in the league. They extended their streak of 50+ win seasons to 13 since the 1999–2000 season, an NBA record. Popovich won his second Coach of the Year. The Spurs swept the first two rounds of the playoffs. With those two sweeps, a 10-game win streak to end the season, and wins in games 1 and 2 of the Western Conference ginals, the Spurs won 20 straight games. However, the Oklahoma City Thunder ended up winning the next four games in the conference finals, to take the series 4–2. During the 2012 off-season, the Spurs re-signed swingman Danny Green, who was a welcome surprise for them from the previous season, and Tim Duncan, both for three years. The Spurs would have a strong 2012–13 season, going 58–24 and earning the second seed in the West.

The Spurs clinched the playoffs for a 16th consecutive season, as well as extended the NBA record with 50+ games for 14 consecutive seasons. On April 16, the Spurs signed two-time scoring champion, and seven-time All-Star Tracy McGrady to help in the playoffs after waiving Stephen Jackson. The Spurs finished the regular season second in the Western Conference behind the Oklahoma City Thunder with a record of 58–24, and swept the Los Angeles Lakers in the first round, 4–0. In the second round of the 2013 playoffs, the Spurs faced Stephen Curry and the Golden State Warriors. They beat the Warriors four games to two. In the conference finals, the Spurs swept the Memphis Grizzlies, with Tony Parker having an 18-assist performance in game two and a 37-point performance in game four. The Spurs would meet the defending champion Miami Heat in the NBA Finals.

The Spurs and Heat would alternate wins the first six games in the series. In game six, the Spurs were on the verge of winning their fifth NBA title. San Antonio was up five points with 28 seconds to go in regulation. An unlikely and uncharacteristic series of mishaps would doom the Spurs down the stretch, including the benching of Duncan by Popovich at the end of regulation with the Spurs on defense. The Heat missed their field goal attempt, but the undersized Spurs could not grab the defensive rebound. Chris Bosh rebounded the ball and Ray Allen hit a 3-pointer to tie the game with five seconds left in regulation to send it to overtime, during which the Spurs were defeated 103–100. In game seven, San Antonio jumped out to a lead early and kept the game close the entire way. Toward the end of the game, however, and despite a 24-point, 12 rebound effort, Duncan failed to convert on two attempts to tie the game: a missed layup and missed tip-in that allowed LeBron James to hit a jumper and increase the Heat's lead to 92–88. After a steal from Ginóbili, James hit two free throws after being fouled by Duncan, and when Ginóbili missed a subsequent 3-pointer, Dwyane Wade hit one out of two from the free-throw line to put the game on ice, as the Heat would win their second straight championship.

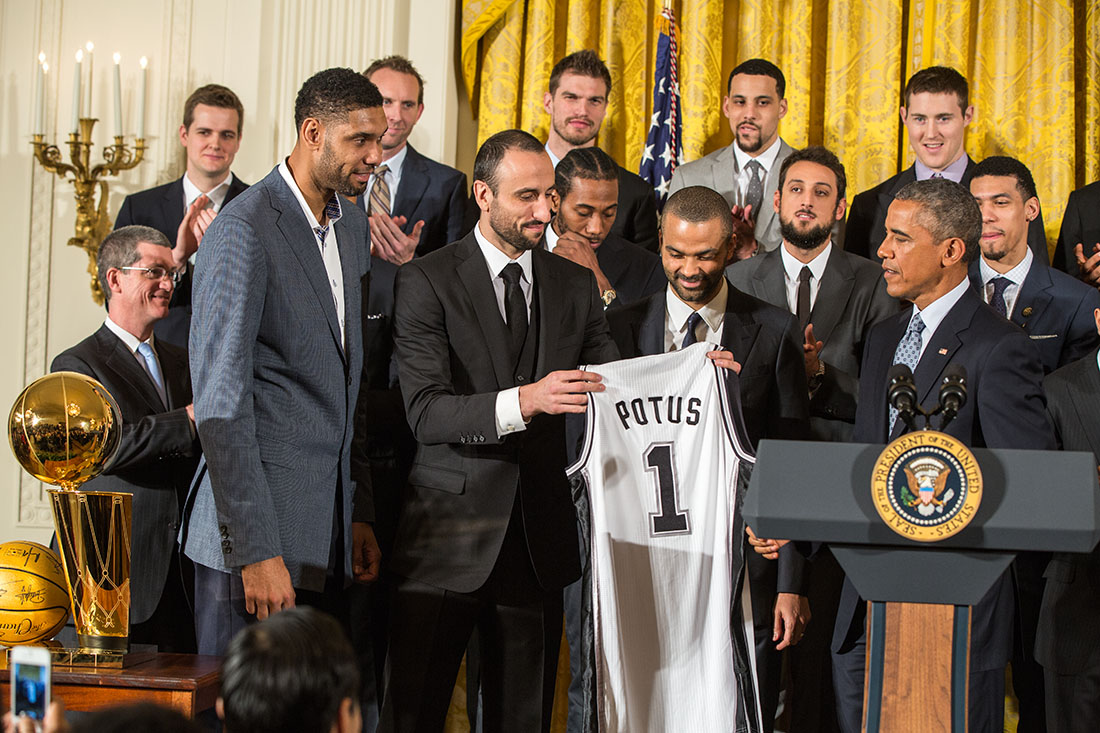
The 2014 NBA champions are received by President Barack Obama at the White House.

The Spurs returned with their core roster largely intact, adding free agents Marco Belinelli and Jeff Ayres (formerly Jeff Pendergraph) while losing Gary Neal to the Milwaukee Bucks. The Spurs clinched the best record in the NBA with 62 wins, which included a franchise-record 19 straight wins in February and March. In the first round of the playoffs, the eighth-seeded Dallas Mavericks surprised the Spurs by taking the series to seven games, but the Spurs prevailed in convincing fashion in the deciding game seven. In the second round, Tim Duncan surpassed Karl Malone for fifth place in NBA playoffs all-time points scored while the Spurs cruised past the Portland Trail Blazers in five games. San Antonio played the Oklahoma City Thunder in the Western Conference finals, which marked the third straight appearance in the conference finals for the Spurs, and defeated them in six games to advance to the Finals for a second straight year for a rematch with the Miami Heat. It was also the first time that they had advanced to the Finals in consecutive years. This made it the first time since the 1998 NBA Finals that the same two teams faced off in the Finals in consecutive years. With a victory in the second game of the series, Duncan, Ginóbili, and Parker won more playoff games together than any other three players on the same team in NBA history. The Spurs would go on to win the 2014 NBA championship in five games (4–1). The Spurs blew out Miami in all of their wins, each of them by 15 or more points. Kawhi Leonard had a breakout performance and was named NBA Finals MVP for his big game performance and is the third-youngest to win it, behind Magic Johnson and teammate Duncan. In the 2014 NBA draft, they selected Kyle Anderson out of UCLA as the 30th overall pick.

During the 2014 off-season, the Spurs made headlines when they announced that they had hired Becky Hammon as an assistant coach, effective with her retirement as a player at the end of the 2014 WNBA season. Hammon became the first full-time female coach in any of the four major U.S. professional leagues. The 2014–15 season was an up-and-down season, but finishing strong with a 55–27 regular season record and sixth seed in the West, they qualified for the playoffs. They faced the Los Angeles Clippers in the first round of the playoffs. The Spurs went up 3–2 heading into game six at San Antonio. However, the Clippers would win that game and go on to win game seven at home. The San Antonio Spurs became the first defending champions since the 2011–12 Dallas Mavericks to be eliminated in the first round of the NBA playoffs.

The Spurs acquired four-time All-Star power forward LaMarcus Aldridge and veteran big man David West during the off-season. On their first game of the season, the Spurs were defeated by the home team, Oklahoma City Thunder, despite a 32-point performance from Kawhi Leonard. Two days after, Duncan and Leonard led the Spurs towards a 102–75 win over the visiting Brooklyn Nets. On November 2, the Spurs defeated the home team, the Boston Celtics, thanks to a double-double performance of LaMarcus Aldridge who recorded 24 points and 14 rebounds. On November 4, the Spurs defeated the home team, the New York Knicks, 94–84, to win their third game of the season, and more importantly, Tim Duncan clinched his 954th career win passing John Stockton (953 wins) for most wins by a player for a single franchise. The Spurs finished the 2015–16 season with a 67–15 record, earning them the Southwest Division title. They also set a franchise record for most wins in a season with 67 and an NBA record for most home wins in a season with 40 (tying the 1985–86 Boston Celtics 40–1 home record). The Spurs also had the league's best defense. During the playoffs, they swept the shorthanded Memphis Grizzlies in the first round before losing to the Oklahoma City Thunder in six games in the second round. They would become the first team since the 2006–07 Dallas Mavericks to finish with 67 wins and be eliminated before the conference finals. On July 11, 2016, Duncan announced his retirement from the NBA after 19 seasons with the Spurs. He became one of two players in NBA history to record at least 26,000 points, 15,000 rebounds and 3,000 blocks in his career (along with Kareem Abdul-Jabbar) while also being the only NBA player to reach 1,000 wins with a single team.

=== 2016–2023: Post-Duncan era ===
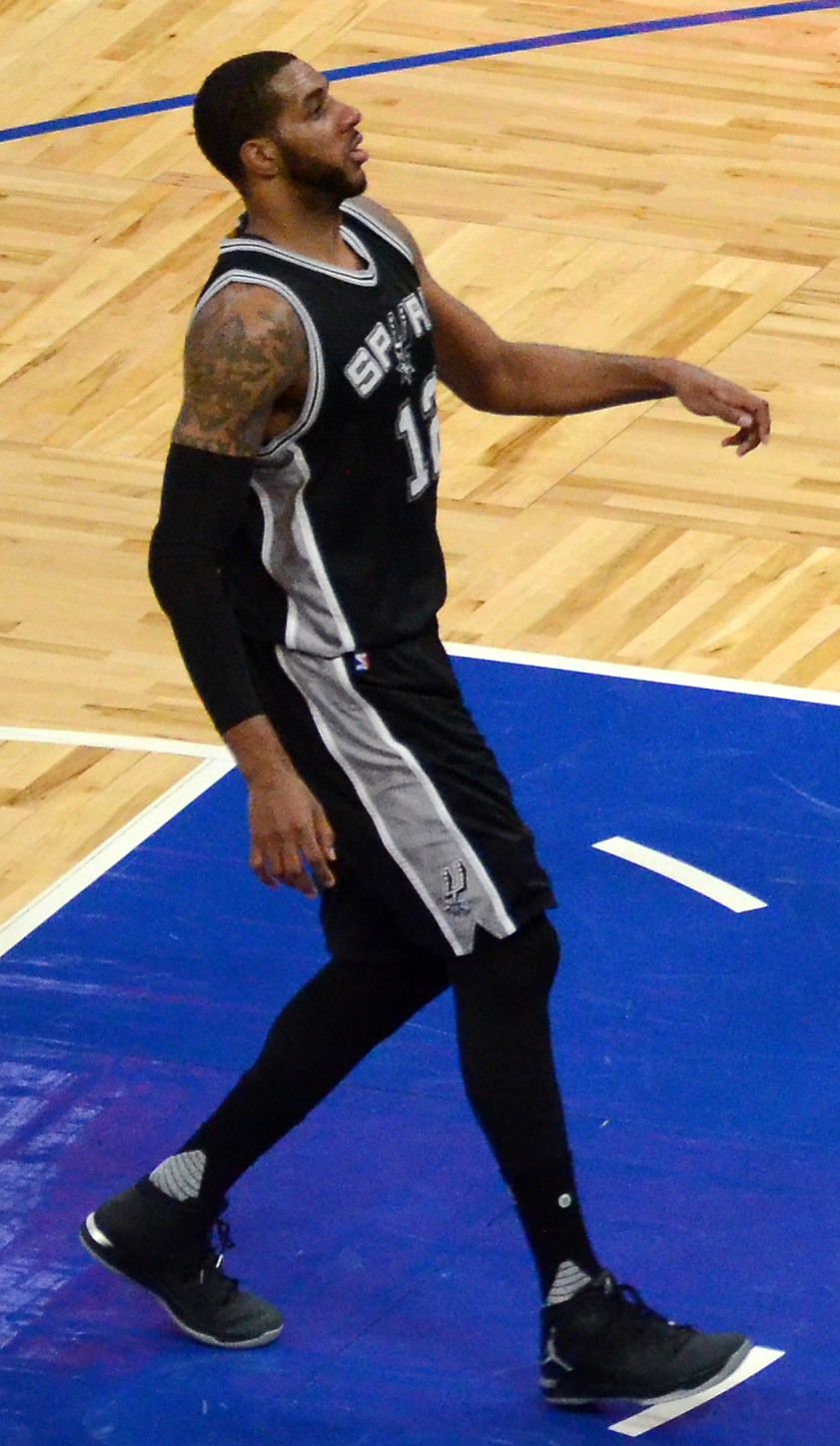
Aldridge made three All-Star games and two All-NBA appearances for the team.

==== 2016–2018: Leonard and Aldridge ====
In the 2016–17 season, despite the retirement of longtime captain Tim Duncan, the Spurs—led by Kawhi Leonard—remained a title contender and finished with a record of 61–21. After defeating the Grizzlies and the Rockets in the first two rounds of the playoffs, the Spurs—who suffered injuries to Leonard, Parker, and David Lee – were swept by the Golden State Warriors in the Western Conference finals. In the third quarter of game one of the 2017 Western Conference cinals, Leonard landed on Zaza Pachulia's foot after attempting a field goal and re-aggravated an existing ankle injury; he sat out the remainder of the series. During the 2017 season, the San Antonio Spurs joined into a partnership with Methodist Healthcare System and Sports Medicine Associates of San Antonio (SMASA). In the following off-season, the Spurs re-signed Aldridge, Pau Gasol and Patty Mills and signed Rudy Gay, but lost Dewayne Dedmon and Jonathon Simmons to free agency.

The Spurs' 2017–18 season was overshadowed by an injury to star Kawhi Leonard and reports of ensuing disputes between Leonard and the Spurs regarding the handling of that injury. Leonard missed the first 27 games of the 2017–18 season with a right quadriceps injury. In January 2018, after a brief comeback, he was ruled out for an indefinite period of time to continue his rehabilitation process from right quadriceps tendinopathy. Leonard was subsequently cleared to play by the Spurs medical staff, but he solicited a second opinion from his own doctors. In March, the Spurs held a players-only meeting in which Leonard's teammates reportedly asked him to return to the court; the meeting was described as "tense and emotional". Leonard did not play again in 2018. On April 3, 2018, the Los Angeles Clippers defeated the Spurs 113–110, handing San Antonio its 33rd loss of the season. This loss ended the Spurs' record streak of eighteen 50-win seasons that had stretched back to 2000, including the 2011–12 season, which was shortened by a lockout (the Spurs finished 50–16). The Spurs eventually finished the season with a record of 47–35 and were defeated 4–1 by the Warriors in the first round of the playoffs. Following the season, LaMarcus Aldridge was named to the All-NBA Second Team and point guard Dejounte Murray was named to the NBA All-Defensive Second Team.

In June 2018, following months of reports of growing tension between Leonard's camp and the Spurs stemming from a disagreement over his injury rehabilitation process, reports indicated that Leonard had requested a trade. On July 18, 2018, Leonard and Danny Green were traded to the Toronto Raptors in exchange for DeMar DeRozan, Jakob Pöltl and a protected 2019 first-round draft pick. On July 6, 2018, Tony Parker signed with the Charlotte Hornets after having played his entire 17-year career with the Spurs. On August 27, Manu Ginóbili announced his retirement after a 16-year career with the Spurs. The Spurs signed forwards Dante Cunningham and Quincy Pondexter, guard Marco Belinelli, and re-signed guard Bryn Forbes, and forward Rudy Gay.

In 2018, the Spurs began training camp without a member of the Big Three for the first time since the 1997–98 season. Despite losing Dejounte Murray for the season to an ACL tear, the Spurs finished the 2018–19 season with a 48–34 record and the seventh seed in the Western Conference, qualifying for the playoffs for the 22nd consecutive playoff season. In the first round of the playoffs, they faced the second-seeded Denver Nuggets, and lost the series in seven games.

==== 2019–2023: Difficult years ====
On March 11, 2020, the NBA suspended the 2019–20 season due to the COVID-19 pandemic after Utah Jazz player Rudy Gobert tested positive for COVID-19. On June 4, it was announced that the season would restart on July 31 for the Spurs and 21 other teams in the NBA Bubble, and would finish no later than October 12. For the first time since the 1996–97 season, the Spurs failed to qualify for the postseason when the Memphis Grizzlies defeated the Milwaukee Bucks on August 13, 2020. The Spurs' failure to make the postseason ended an NBA record-tying streak of 22 consecutive playoff appearances. The Spurs finished the COVID-shortened season with a record of 32–39. The 2019–2020 season was also the first season since 1996–1997 in which the Spurs finished with a losing record.

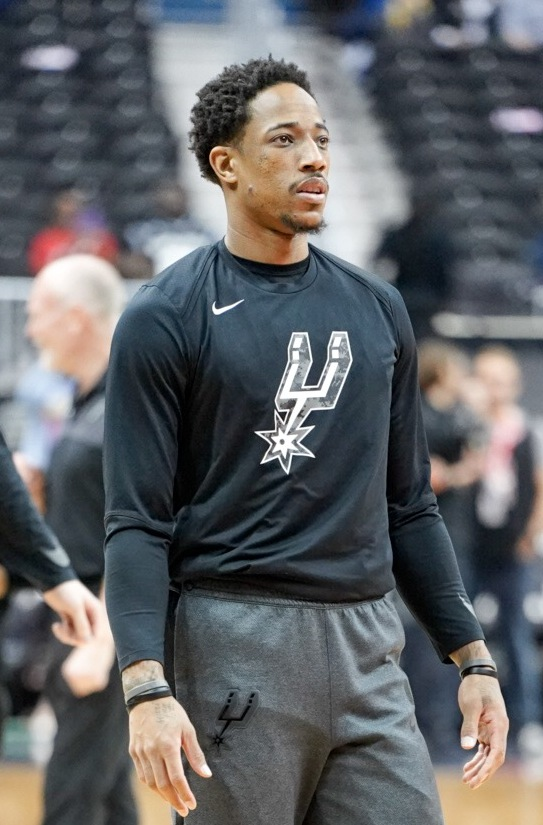
DeMar DeRozan was traded to the Spurs for Kawhi Leonard

Because of the continuing COVID-19 pandemic, the 2020-2021 NBA regular season was shortened to 72 games and began on December 22, 2020. The season began only 72 days after the 2020 NBA Finals ended, making the 2020 off-season the shortest off-season in league history. At one point, the 2020–2021 Spurs held a record of 22–16; however, the team faltered down the stretch, and finished the season with a 33–39 record. Thirty-five-year-old star LaMarcus Aldridge left the team midway through the season, agreeing to a contract buyout. The Spurs were hurt by poor three-point shooting and by injuries to starting guard Derrick White; however, Keldon Johnson and other young players made positive strides over the course of the season. DeMar DeRozan led the team in scoring, averaging 21.6 points per game.

At the conclusion of the 2020–2021 season, the NBA held a play-in tournament. As the tenth seed in the Western Conference, the Spurs participated in the tournament. The team was defeated by the Memphis Grizzlies, 100–96. The loss marked the first time in Spurs history that the team missed the playoffs in two consecutive seasons. Following the 2020–2021 season, DeRozan was traded to the Chicago Bulls in a sign-and-trade deal for Thaddeus Young, Al-Farouq Aminu, a protected first-round draft pick, and the Bulls' 2022 and 2025 second-round picks. In addition, longtime Spur Patty Mills left the team in free agency, and the Spurs signed sharpshooter Doug McDermott.

The Spurs picked up Joshua Primo in the NBA Draft at number 12. At the trade deadline, Derrick White was dealt to the Celtics as part of a three team trade. Dejounte Murray had a breakout year, representing the Spurs at the All-Star Game, the first Spur to do so since Lamarcus Aldridge in 2019. The Spurs finished 34-48 and would make the play-in but fail to advance to the playoffs.

The 2022–23 season was San Antonio's worst since the 1996–97 season. During the off-season, Dejounte Murray and Jock Landale were traded to the Atlanta Hawks for Danilo Gallinari and future draft picks. The Spurs picked Jeremy Sochan, Malaki Branham and Blake Wesley in the first round of the draft, going 9th, 20th and 25th respectively. On January 13, 2023, the Spurs set a regular season single-game attendance record with 68,323 spectators at the Alamodome in a game against the Golden State Warriors. San Antonio finished the season 22–60 at the bottom of the West.

=== 2023–present: The Victor Wembanyama era ===
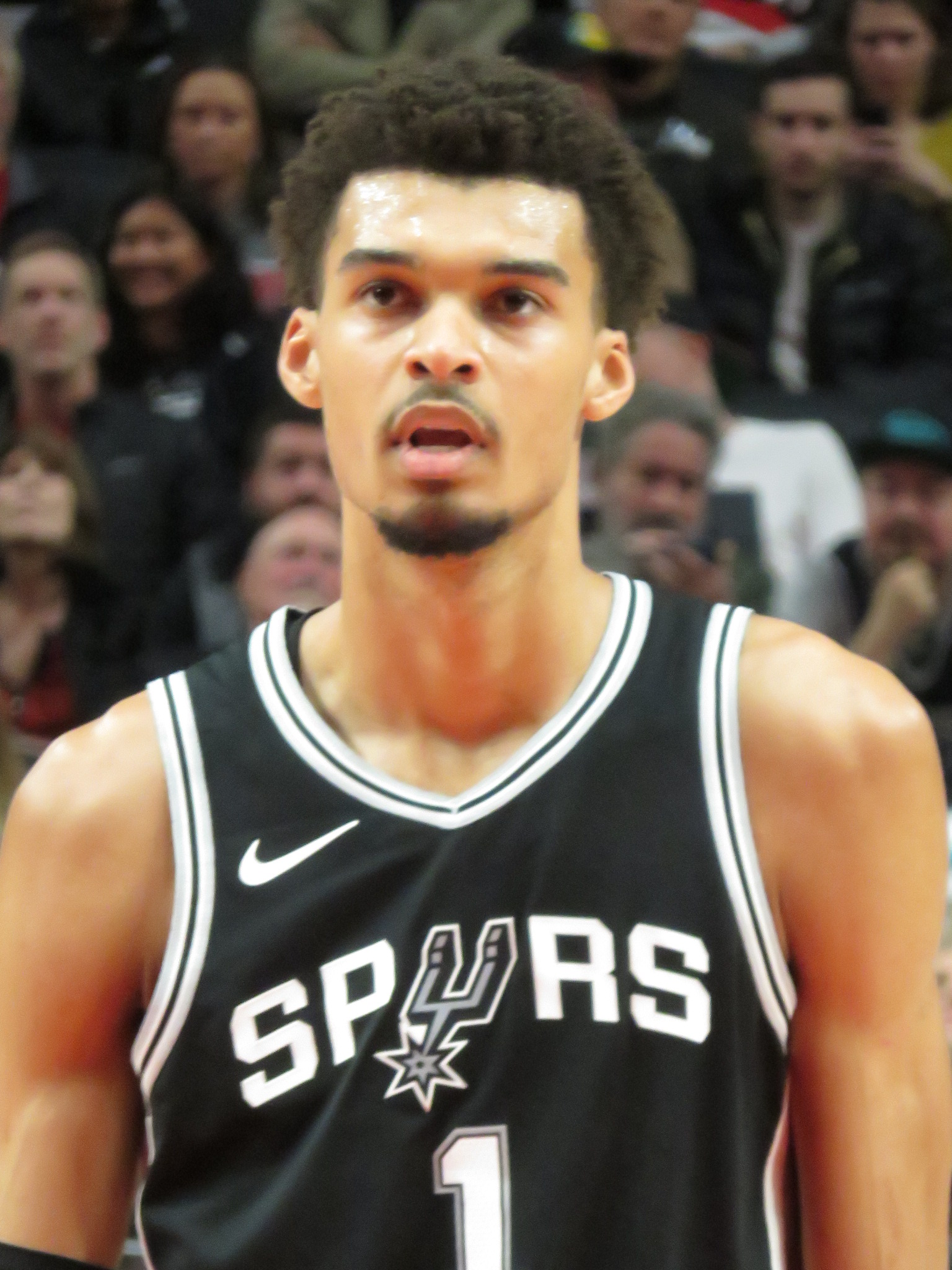
Wembanyama in 2024

==== 2023–2025: Continued rebuild ====
On May 16, 2023, the Spurs won the draft lottery, allowing them to receive the first pick in the 2023 NBA draft. This marked their third time selecting first overall, having previously chosen David Robinson in 1987 and Tim Duncan in 1997. The Spurs used their number one pick to select Victor Wembanyama, who had long been expected to be drafted first overall. Wembanyama was unanimously elected Rookie of the Year and came second in Defensive Player of the Year voting, as well as setting many more rookie records. Despite Wembanyama's best efforts, the team failed to improve upon their previous regular season record, ending with another 22–60 record, and were eliminated from playoff contention following a loss to the Sacramento Kings on March 7.

During the following off-season, the Spurs signed veterans Chris Paul and Harrison Barnes. They also drafted Stephon Castle and Rob Dillingham, although Dillingham was later traded away to the Minnesota Timberwolves. Near the start of the season, Gregg Popovich was announced indefinitely out for the season due to health issues and was replaced by Mitch Johnson. A few days before the trade deadline, the Spurs acquired All-Star point guard De'Aaron Fox as part of a three-team deal with the Chicago Bulls and the Sacramento Kings. After 46 games, Wembanyama was announced to miss the rest of the season due to blood clots. Following the season, Castle was named Rookie of the Year. On May 2, 2025, Popovich announced that he would step down as the head coach but remain president of basketball operations. Mitch Johnson was named the team's permanent head coach.

==== 2025–2026: Finals appearance ====
The 2025–26 season marked the best regular season record for the Spurs since the 2015–16 season. In the 2025 NBA draft, the Spurs received the second and 14th overall picks and drafted Dylan Harper and Carter Bryant, respectively. The Spurs opened the regular season with their best start in franchise history, winning their first five games. In the 2025 NBA Cup, San Antonio emerged as the winner of West Group C, and upset the defending NBA champion Oklahoma City Thunder in the semifinals before falling to the New York Knicks in the championship game. Victor Wembanyama and De'Aaron Fox were both selected to the 2026 NBA All-Star Game, with Wembanayma earning his first selection as a starter and both players making their second All-Star appearances.

The Spurs clinched a playoff berth following a victory against the Phoenix Suns on March 19, securing their first playoff appearance since 2019. The Spurs would also clinch their first Southwest Division title since the 2016–17 season following a victory against the Miami Heat on March 23. They would end their regular season with the second-best record in the league with a 62–20 record, and entered the playoffs as the second seed in the Western Conference. They faced the Portland Trail Blazers in the first round of the 2026 NBA playoffs, defeating in five games. In the second round, they defeated the Minnesota Timberwolves in six games, but Wembanyama was ejected in game four for elbowing Naz Reid in the neck area. Eventually, the Spurs outlasted the Oklahoma City Thunder in seven games to reach their first NBA Finals since 2014. The Spurs started out losing games 1 and 2, but ended up winning game three, which was the most watched NBA Finals game three since 1998, and the largest television audience since Super Bowl LX on February 8, 2026. The team then lost games 4 and 5 as the Knicks won the NBA Finals.

== Rivalries ==
=== Los Angeles Lakers ===
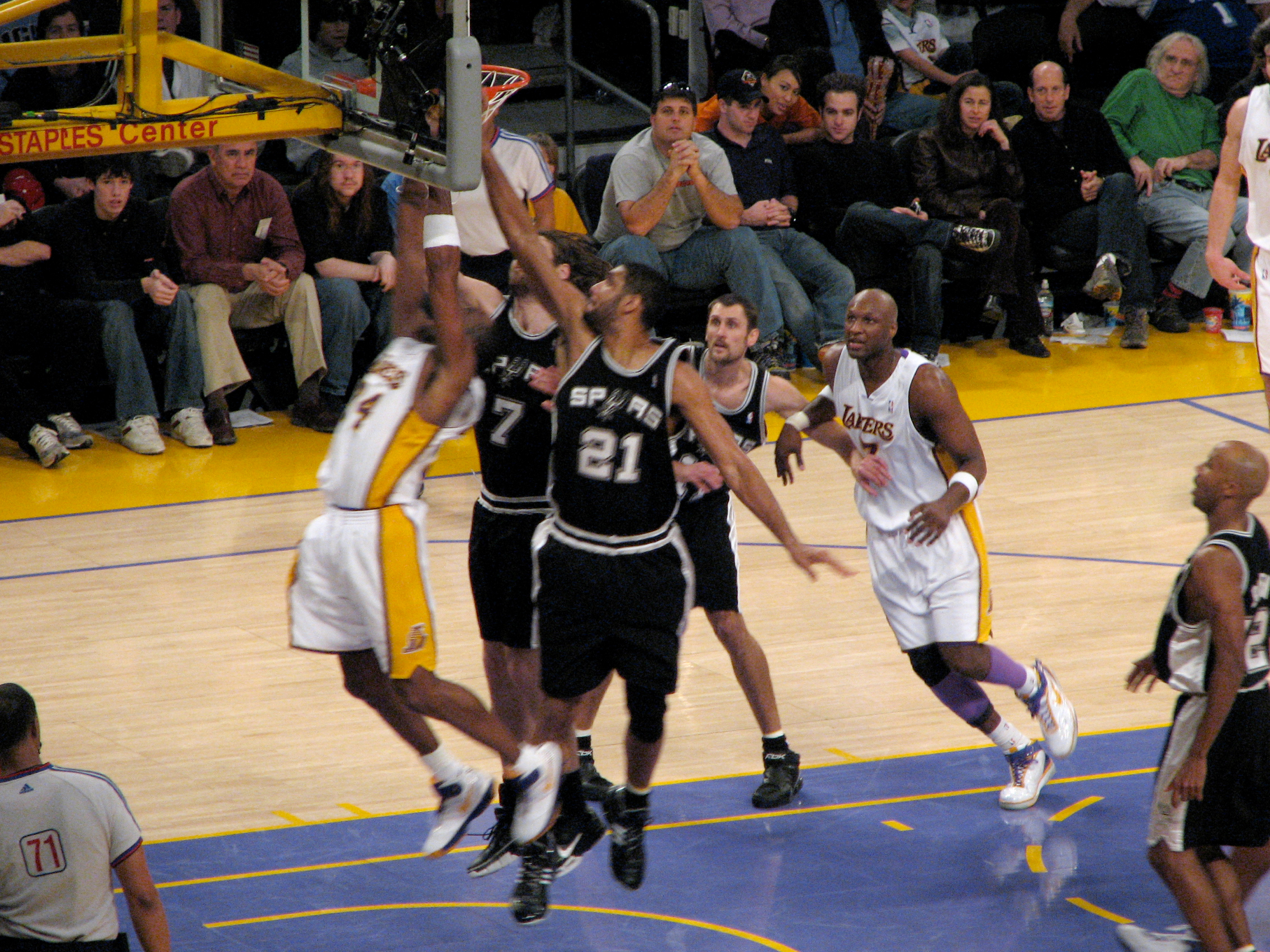
From 1999 to 2005, the Spurs and Lakers combined to win seven straight Western Conference titles.

From 1999 to 2004, the rivalry between the Spurs and the Los Angeles Lakers was considered the NBA's best. The two teams met in the playoffs five times in six seasons, and one of the two teams advanced to the NBA Finals every year from 1999 to 2005.

=== Dallas Mavericks ===
The rivalry between the San Antonio Spurs and the Dallas Mavericks features two teams with Dallas roots. The Mavericks were swept in the 2012–13 season by the Spurs for the first time since the 1998 season, Tim Duncan's rookie season. In their last matchup of the season, San Antonio escaped with a 95–94 victory over Dallas when a Vince Carter attempt bounced off the rim at the buzzer. With that win, the Spurs clinched a playoff spot for a 16th straight season. San Antonio also reached 50 wins for a 14th consecutive season, the longest streak in NBA history.

=== Phoenix Suns ===
Since 1992, the Spurs and the Phoenix Suns have met 10 times in the playoffs, in which the Spurs have won six series and the Suns have won four. Some of the most notable moments of their rivalry include Charles Barkley's game-winning jump shot in the 1993 playoffs in the final game at the HemisFair Arena, Stephon Marbury's buzzer-beating three-pointer in game one of the first round of the 2003 playoffs, Robert Horry's hip check on Steve Nash in game four of the 2007 playoffs, Tim Duncan's game-tying three-pointer in game one of the 2008 first round, and Goran Dragić's 23-point outburst in the fourth quarter of game three in the West semifinals of the 2010 playoffs.

=== Houston Rockets ===
The rivalry between the Spurs and the Houston Rockets was renewed in the 2017 playoffs, in which the two teams met in the Western Conference semifinals. The match-up was the first between the two teams in the playoffs since the 1995 Western Conference finals. In game two of the series, starting point guard Tony Parker suffered a ruptured quadriceps tendon, forcing him to miss the remainder of the playoffs. In game five, all-star small forward Kawhi Leonard suffered an injury to his right ankle in the third quarter, resulting in him sitting out for the closing portions of the game. Despite the injury issues, the Spurs were able to send game five to overtime. In the overtime period, Manu Ginóbili blocked James Harden's three-point attempt in the final seconds to secure the 110–107 victory for the Spurs. The Spurs would close out the series in a game six with a 114–75 win.

=== Oklahoma City Thunder ===
The rivalry between the San Antonio Spurs and Oklahoma City Thunder, which defined the Western Conference in the 2010s, has been reborn in the mid-2020s, driven by the emergence of Victor Wembanyama and the rise of a young Thunder squad. While the early 2010s focused on a clash of styles (Spurs' experience vs. Thunder's athleticism), the current era is defined by young, top-tier talent facing off in a division matchup that has recently seen the Spurs dominate the defending-champion Thunder.

== Logo and uniforms ==
The San Antonio Spurs' previous wordmark logo

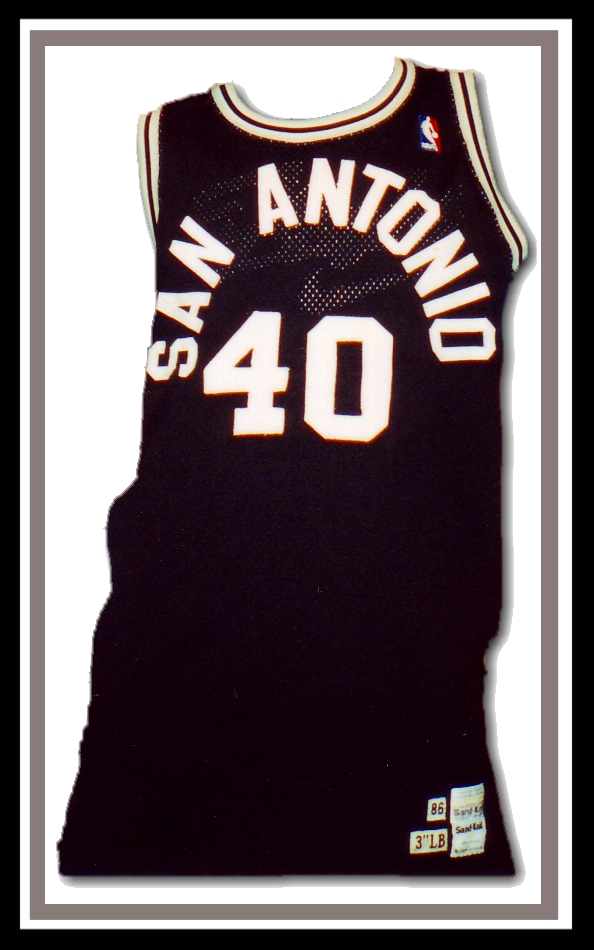
The Spurs sported radially arched black-and-white letters on their uniforms during much of the 1980s.

Since becoming the San Antonio Spurs in 1973, the team colors have been black, silver and white. The distinctive logo of the word Spurs in Eurostile font, with the stylized spur substituting for the letter U, has been a part of the team's identity since their move to San Antonio. The logo incorporated 'Fiesta colors' of pink, orange and turquoise, used from 1989 to 2002 (though the uniforms remained the same), and alignment from straight to arched beginning with the 2002–03 NBA season.

The Spurs have always worn black on the road and white at home, except during the 1973–76 ABA seasons and their first NBA season when the home uniform was always silver. Until the 1988–89 NBA season, the road uniform had "San Antonio" on the front while the home uniform featured the team nickname adopted from the Spurs logo; from 1973 to 1982, the road uniform lettering was black with silver trim. In addition, from 1977 to 1981 a saddle-like striping was featured on the back of the home shorts. Since the 1989–90 NBA season the Spurs uniform has remained practically the same, with the road uniform now using the team nickname from their logo; a minor change included the addition of another black (road) and white (home) trim to the already silver-trimmed block numbers in the 2002–03 season. In 2003–04 and later in 2006–07, they wore silver throwback jerseys to honor their late 1970s team. The Spurs wear black sneakers and socks on the road, and white sneakers and socks at home (except for select games with the silver alternates), a practice that began in the 2002–03 season. When the NBA moved to the Adidas Revolution 30 technology for the 2010–11 season, the Spurs changed to V-neck jerseys and eliminated striping on the shorts' beltline.

On September 19, 2012, the Spurs unveiled a silver alternate uniform. In breaking from the traditional practice of placing the team or city name in front, the Spurs' new uniform features only the stylized spur logo, with the black number trimmed in white and silver on the upper right. The Spurs primary logo is atop the player name and number on the back (replaced by the NBA logo prior to the 2014–15 season), while the Eurostile 'SA' initials (for San Antonio) are on the left leg of the shorts. They also wore ABA throwbacks of Chaparrals team. Black, silver and white side stripes are also featured on the uniform. The uniforms are worn for select home games. A variation of this uniform, featuring military camouflage patterns instead of the usual silver, was used for two games in the 2013–14 season; a sleeved version was used the next season. Another variation, this time in black, was unveiled for the 2015–16 season.

At times throughout the season, the Spurs wear a jersey that says "Los Spurs" on the front, in recognition of Latino fans both at home and across the US and Latin America. The Spurs (located in a city with a large Hispanic population) were one of the first NBA teams to wear these branded jerseys. In 2014, the jerseys were sleeved. These events are called "Noches Latinas", first launched during the 2006–07 NBA season, part of a Hispanic marketing campaign known as "éne-bé-a". Six teams in the NBA participate in these events. The Spurs have had the most players from Latin America and are one of only three NBA teams who have had at least five players on their rosters who originate from Latin America and Spain (if one includes Puerto Rico as part of Latin America, although it is a U.S. territory), the others being the Memphis Grizzlies and the Portland Trail Blazers.

The switch to Nike as the uniform provider in 2017 eliminated the "home" and "away" uniform designations. The Spurs' black "Icon", silver "Statement" and white "Association" uniform remained identical to the previous set save for the manufacturer's logo and switch from Eurostile to custom block lettering on the team name. They also continued to wear their camouflage-style uniforms as part of the "City" edition. However, the Spurs retired their camouflage-style "City" uniforms prior to the 2020–21 season in favor of a design influenced by the team's 1989–2002 "Fiesta" era. This design was brought back in the 2025–26 season after the NBA chose to revisit past "City" uniform designs for that season. The Spurs reprised the "Fiesta" theme for the 2021–22 season, but mixed in a few elements from previous uniforms. The shorts featured turquoise diamonds in homage to the George Gervin-era uniforms, and the logo on the left leg honored the Dallas Chaparrals. In 2022, the Spurs replaced their silver "Statement" uniforms with a black one, but with silver letters, a new "SATX" wordmark, a new "Texas spur" alternate logo, and grayscale patterns inspired from traditional serapes and saddle blankets. Also during the season, the Spurs wore a turquoise "City" uniform with elements based on the uniforms worn in the 1996 NBA All-Star Game. The "City" uniform in the 2023–24 season paid homage to Hemisfair '68, featuring a white base, tan and orange stripes. Also featured is a psychedelic-style "San Antonio" wordmark in brown along with neon light-inspired numbers in sand, white and brown accents. The Hemisfair-themed design, albeit in light blue, was reused for the 2024–25 "City" uniform.

In the 2025–26 season, the Spurs released a new "Statement" uniform, returning to a silver base but with a block "San Antonio" on the chest. This marked the first time since the 1988–89 season that the city name was featured on a core Spurs uniform.

=== Mascot ===
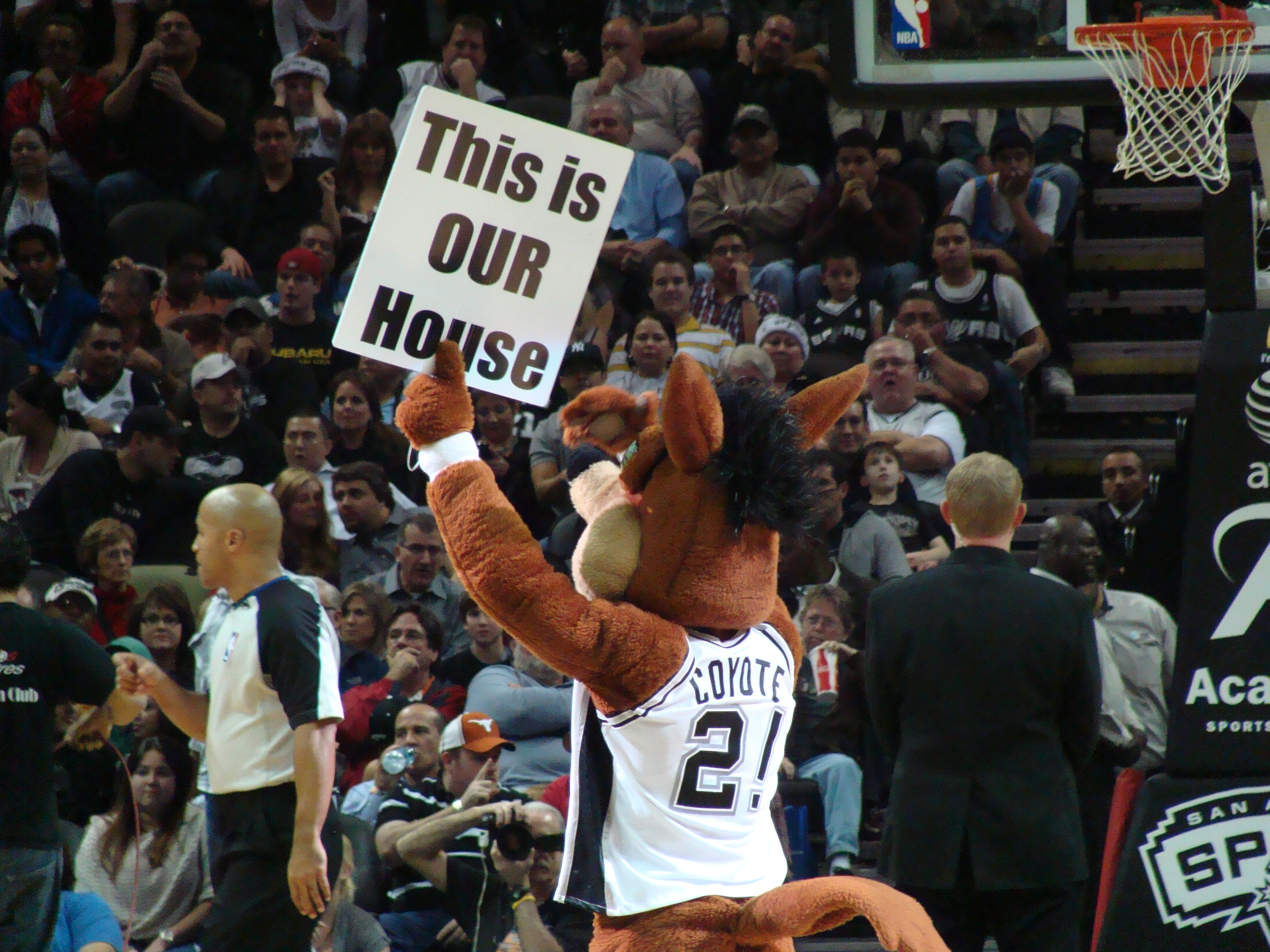
The Coyote showing a sign to the crowd during a time-out at a Spurs game

The Coyote has been the Spurs' mascot since 1983. Created by and portrayed for 21 years by Tim Derk, Coyote is known for his slapstick humor, rehearsed skits and previous dance numbers with Spurs' cheerleaders, the Silver Dancers, who were replaced in 2018 after 26 years. The Coyote was a 2007 inductee into the Mascot Hall of Fame and has been featured in local and national media.

== Season-by-season record ==
List of the last five seasons completed by the Spurs. For the full season-by-season history, see List of San Antonio Spurs seasons.

Note: GP = Games played, W = Wins, L = Losses, W–L% = Winning percentage

| Season | GP | W | L | W–L% | Finish | Playoffs |
| 2021–22 | 82 | 34 | 48 | .415 | 4th, Southwest | Did not qualify |
| 2022–23 | 82 | 22 | 60 | .268 | 5th, Southwest | Did not qualify |
| 2023–24 | 82 | 22 | 60 | .268 | 5th, Southwest | Did not qualify |
| 2024–25 | 82 | 34 | 48 | .415 | 4th, Southwest | Did not qualify |
| 2025–26 | 82 | 62 | 20 | .756 | 1st, Southwest | Lost in NBA Finals, 1–4 (Knicks) |

== Arena history ==
Dallas (Texas) Chaparrals

- State Fair Coliseum (1967–1973)
- Moody Coliseum (1967–1973)
- Tarrant County Coliseum (1970–1971)
- Lubbock Municipal Coliseum (1970–1971)

San Antonio Spurs

- HemisFair Arena (1973–1993)
- Alamodome (1993–2002, 2023)
- Frost Bank Center (formerly SBC Center and AT&T Center) (2002–present)
- In November 2025, San Antonio Voters approved a proposition to build a new arena for the Spurs, situated in Downtown San Antonio.

== Personnel ==
=== Current roster ===
San Antonio Spurs roster
Players

| Pos. | No. | Player | Height | Weight | DOB | From |
|---|---|---|---|---|---|---|
| F | 40 | Harrison Barnes | 6 ft 7 in (2.01 m) | 225 lb (102 kg) | 1992-05-30 | North Carolina |
| F | 15 | Maliq Brown (TW) | 6 ft 8 in (2.03 m) | 225 lb (102 kg) | 2003-11-16 | Duke |
| F | 11 | Carter Bryant | 6 ft 6 in (1.98 m) | 220 lb (100 kg) | 2005-11-26 | Arizona |
| G | 5 | Stephon Castle | 6 ft 6 in (1.98 m) | 215 lb (98 kg) | 2004-11-01 | Connecticut |
| F | 30 | Julian Champagnie | 6 ft 7 in (2.01 m) | 217 lb (98 kg) | 2001-06-29 | St. John's |
| G | 4 | De'Aaron Fox | 6 ft 3 in (1.91 m) | 185 lb (84 kg) | 1997-12-20 | Kentucky |
| G | 17 | Ja'Kobi Gillespie (TW) | 6 ft 0 in (1.83 m) | 186 lb (84 kg) | 2004-03-10 | Tennessee |
| G | 2 | Dylan Harper | 6 ft 5 in (1.96 m) | 215 lb (98 kg) | 2006-03-02 | Rutgers |
| F | 23 | Tobias Harris (injured) | 6 ft 8 in (2.03 m) | 226 lb (103 kg) | 1992-07-15 | Tennessee |
| G/F | 3 | Keldon Johnson | 6 ft 5 in (1.96 m) | 220 lb (100 kg) | 1999-10-11 | Kentucky |
| G | 25 | David Jones García (TW) | 6 ft 4 in (1.93 m) | 210 lb (95 kg) | 2001-11-24 | Memphis |
| F/C | 7 | Luke Kornet | 7 ft 1 in (2.16 m) | 250 lb (113 kg) | 1995-07-15 | Vanderbilt |
| G | 0 | Jordan McLaughlin | 5 ft 11 in (1.80 m) | 185 lb (84 kg) | 1996-04-09 | USC |
| F | 22 | Jayden Quaintance (injured) | 6 ft 9 in (2.06 m) | 255 lb (116 kg) | 2007-07-11 | Kentucky |
| C | 10 | Tarris Reed Jr. | 6 ft 10 in (2.08 m) | 265 lb (120 kg) | 2003-08-05 | Connecticut |
| G/F | 24 | Devin Vassell | 6 ft 5 in (1.96 m) | 200 lb (91 kg) | 2000-08-23 | Florida State |
| F/C | 1 | Victor Wembanyama | 7 ft 4 in (2.24 m) | 235 lb (107 kg) | 2004-01-04 | France |

Coaches
**Head coach**
- Mitch Johnson
**Assistant(s)**
- Jimmy Baron
- Josh Brannon
- Brett Brown
- Billy Donovan
- Scott King
- Tim Martin
- Matthew Nielsen
- Mike Noyes
- L. D. Williams
- Corliss Williamson

**Legend**
- **(DP)** Unsigned draft pick
- **(FA)** Free agent
- **(S)** Suspended
- **(GL)** On assignment to G League affiliate
- **(TW)** Two-way affiliate player
- Injured

Roster
Updated: October 15, 2026

=== Retained draft rights ===
The Spurs own the NBA rights to the players listed in the table below. The typical pattern is to allow the player to develop in leagues outside the United States. The player is free to negotiate contracts in other leagues and is not obligated to play in the NBA. Sometimes, a player's overseas contract may have an expensive buyout clause that would discourage the Spurs from seeking to bring him in. The Spurs have had past success in finding foreign talent; some examples of this success include the selections of second-rounder Manu Ginóbili (57th overall in 1999) and first-rounder Tony Parker (28th overall in 2001), who both went on to become All-Stars.

| Draft | Round | Pick | Player | Pos. | Nationality | Current team | Note(s) | Ref |
|---|---|---|---|---|---|---|---|---|
| 2024 | 2 | 36 | Juan Núñez | G | Spain | FC Barcelona (Spain) | Acquired from the Indiana Pacers | |
| 2011 | 2 | 59 | Ádám Hanga | G/F | Hungary | Joventut Badalona (Spain) | | |

=== Retired numbers ===
**San Antonio Spurs retired numbers**
| No. | Player | Position | Tenure | Date |
| **00** | Johnny Moore | G | 1980–1987; 1989–1990 | March 20, 1998 |
| **6** | Avery Johnson | G | 1991; 1992–1993; 1994–2001 | December 22, 2007 |
| **9** | Tony Parker | G | 2001–2018 | November 11, 2019 |
| **12** ^{1} | Bruce Bowen | F | 2001–2009 | March 21, 2012 |
| **13** | James Silas | G | 1972–1981 | February 28, 1984 |
| **20** | Manu Ginóbili | G | 2002–2018 | March 28, 2019 |
| **21** | Tim Duncan | F/C | 1997–2016 | December 18, 2016 |
| **32** | Sean Elliott | F | 1989–1993; 1994–2001 | March 6, 2005 |
| **44** | George Gervin | G | 1974–1985 | December 5, 1987 |
| **50** | David Robinson | C | 1989–2003 | November 10, 2003 |
| **1390** | Gregg Popovich | Coach | 1996–2025 | October 26, 2025 |

Notes:

- ^{1} LaMarcus Aldridge wore the number from 2015 to 2021 with permission from Bruce Bowen on July 9, 2015.
- The NBA retired Bill Russell's No. 6 for all its member teams on August 11, 2022.
- On October 26, 2025, the Spurs put up a "Pop 1,390" banner prior to the home opener to honor Gregg Popovich for his 1,390 regular season wins (excluding his final incomplete season). It also includes five stars (five NBA Championships and his induction to Hall of Fame in 2023.)

=== Basketball Hall of Famers ===
San Antonio Spurs Basketball Hall of Famers
Players
| No. | Name | Position | Tenure | Inducted |
|---|---|---|---|---|
| **16** | Cliff Hagan ^{1} | F/G | 1967–1969 | 1978 |
| **44** | George Gervin | G/F | 1974–1985 | 1996 |
| **2** | Moses Malone | C/F | 1994–1995 | 2001 |
| **21** | Dominique Wilkins | F | 1996–1997 | 2006 |
| **50** | David Robinson ^{2} | C | 1989–2003 | 2009 |
| **53** | Artis Gilmore | C | 1982–1987 | 2011 |
| **10** | Dennis Rodman | F | 1993–1995 | 2011 |
| **10** | Louie Dampier | G | 1976–1979 | 2015 |
| **1** | Tracy McGrady | G/F | 2013 | 2017 |
| **10** | Maurice Cheeks | G | 1989–1990 | 2018 |
| **21** | Tim Duncan | F | 1997–2016 | 2020 |
| **20** | Manu Ginóbili | G | 2002–2018 | 2022 |
| **16** | Pau Gasol | F/C | 2016–2019 | 2023 |
| **9** | Tony Parker | G | 2001–2018 | 2023 |
Coaches
| Name | | Position | Tenure | Inducted |
| Larry Brown | | Head coach | 1988–1992 | 2002 |
| Jerry Tarkanian | | Head coach | 1992 | 2013 |
| **22** | George Karl ^{3} | Assistant coach | 1978–1980 | 2022 |
| Gregg Popovich | | Assistant coach Head coach | 1988–1992; 1996–2025 | 2023 |
Contributors
| Cotton Fitzsimmons | | Head coach | 1984–1986 | 2021 |

Notes:

- ^{1} He also coached the team in 1967–1970.
- ^{2} In total, Robinson was inducted into the Hall of Fame twice – as player and as a member of the 1992 Olympic team.
- ^{3} He also played for the team (1973–1978).

=== FIBA Hall of Famers ===
San Antonio Spurs Hall of Famers
Players
| No. | Name | Position | Tenure | Inducted |
|---|---|---|---|---|
| **50** | David Robinson ^{1} | C | 1989–2003 | 2013 |
| **10** | Andrew Gaze | G | 1999 | 2013 |
| **7** | Fabricio Oberto | C | 2005–2009 | 2019 |
| **16** | Pau Gasol | F/C | 2016–2019 | 2025 |
| **14** | Hedo Türkoğlu | F | 2003–2004 | 2026 |
Coaches
| Name | | Position | Tenure | Inducted |
| Ettore Messina | | Assistant coach | 2014–2019 | 2021 |

Notes:

- ^{1} In total, Robinson was inducted into the FIBA Hall of Fame twice – as player and as a member of the 1992 Olympic team.

=== Franchise leaders ===
Bold denotes still active with the team. Italics denotes still active, but not with the team. "Name*" includes combined statistics for the team from both the ABA and NBA.

Points scored (regular season) as of the end of the 2025–26 season

1. Tim Duncan (26,496)
2. George Gervin* (23,602)
3. David Robinson (20,790)
4. Tony Parker (18,943)
5. Manu Ginóbili (14,043)
6. James Silas* (10,290)
7. Mike Mitchell (9,799)
8. Sean Elliott (9,659)
9. Larry Kenon* (8,248)
10. LaMarcus Aldridge (7,325)
11. **Keldon Johnson** (6,842)
12. Kawhi Leonard (6,654)
13. Avery Johnson (6,486)
14. Rich Jones* (6,466)
15. Alvin Robertson (6,285)
16. Patty Mills (6,218)
17. Artis Gilmore (6,127)
18. John Beasley* (5,983)
19. Willie Anderson (5,946)
20. Mark Olberding* (5,626)

Other statistics (regular season) as of the end of the 2025–26 season

Most minutes played
| Player | Minutes |
|---|---|
| Tim Duncan | 47,368 |
| Tony Parker | 37,276 |
| David Robinson | 34,271 |
| George Gervin* | 31,115 |
| Manu Ginóbili | 26,859 |
| Sean Elliott | 22,093 |
| Avery Johnson | 20,009 |
| James Silas* | 18,916 |
| Bruce Bowen | 18,689 |
| Mike Mitchell | 15,992 |

Most rebounds
| Player | Rebounds |
|---|---|
| Tim Duncan | 15,091 |
| David Robinson | 10,497 |
| George Gervin* | 4,841 |
| Larry Kenon* | 4,114 |
| Manu Ginóbili | 3,697 |
| John Beasley* | 3,673 |
| Artis Gilmore | 3,671 |
| Tony Parker | 3,313 |
| Billy Paultz* | 3,203 |
| Rich Jones* | 3,137 |

Most assists
| Player | Assists |
|---|---|
| Tony Parker | 6,829 |
| Avery Johnson | 4,474 |
| Tim Duncan | 4,225 |
| Manu Ginóbili | 4,001 |
| Johnny Moore | 3,865 |
| George Gervin | 2,523 |
| David Robinson | 2,441 |
| James Silas | 2,406 |
| Alvin Robertson | 2,094 |
| Mike Gale* | 1,878 |

Most steals
| Player | Steals |
|---|---|
| Manu Ginóbili | 1,392 |
| David Robinson | 1,388 |
| George Gervin* | 1,159 |
| Alvin Robertson | 1,128 |
| Tony Parker | 1,032 |
| Tim Duncan | 1,025 |
| Johnny Moore | 1,017 |
| Mike Gale* | 803 |
| Kawhi Leonard | 723 |
| Avery Johnson | 712 |

Most blocks
| Player | Blocks |
|---|---|
| Tim Duncan | 3,020 |
| David Robinson | 2,954 |
| George Gervin* | 938 |
| Billy Paultz* | 796 |
| Artis Gilmore | 700 |
| **Victor Wembanyama** | 627 |
| George T. Johnson | 512 |
| LaMarcus Aldridge | 471 |
| Jakob Pöltl | 456 |
| Danny Green | 450 |

Most three-pointers made
| Player | 3-pointers made |
|---|---|
| Manu Ginóbili | 1,495 |
| Patty Mills | 1,171 |
| Danny Green | 959 |
| **Devin Vassell** | 782 |
| **Keldon Johnson** | 679 |
| Bruce Bowen | 661 |
| Matt Bonner | 656 |
| Sean Elliott | 563 |
| Kawhi Leonard | 529 |
| **Julian Champagnie** | 507 |

== Individual awards ==
=== NBA individual awards ===
NBA Most Valuable Player

- David Robinson – 1995
- Tim Duncan – 2002, 2003

NBA Finals MVP

- Tim Duncan – 1999, 2003, 2005
- Tony Parker – 2007
- Kawhi Leonard – 2014

NBA Western Conference finals MVP

- Victor Wembanyama – 2026

NBA Rookie of the Year

- David Robinson – 1990
- Tim Duncan – 1998
- Victor Wembanyama – 2024
- Stephon Castle – 2025

NBA Defensive Player of the Year

- Alvin Robertson – 1986
- David Robinson – 1992
- Kawhi Leonard – 2015, 2016
- Victor Wembanyama – 2026

NBA Sixth Man of the Year

- Manu Ginóbili – 2008
- Keldon Johnson – 2026

NBA Most Improved Player Award

- Alvin Robertson – 1986

NBA Coach of the Year

- Gregg Popovich – 2003, 2012, 2014

NBA Executive of the Year

- Angelo Drossos – 1978
- Bob Bass – 1990
- R.C. Buford – 2014, 2016

NBA Sportsmanship Award

- Avery Johnson – 1998
- David Robinson – 2001
- Steve Smith – 2002

J. Walter Kennedy Citizenship Award

- David Robinson – 2003

Twyman–Stokes Teammate of the Year Award

- Tim Duncan – 2015

NBA scoring champion

- George Gervin – 1978, 1979, 1980, 1982
- David Robinson – 1994

NBA rebounding leader

- David Robinson – 1991
- Dennis Rodman – 1994, 1995

NBA assists leader

- Johnny Moore – 1982

NBA blocks leader

- George T. Johnson – 1981, 1982
- David Robinson – 1992
- Victor Wembanyama – 2024–2026

NBA steals leader

- Alvin Robertson – 1986, 1987
- Kawhi Leonard – 2015
- Dejounte Murray – 2022

All-NBA First Team

- George Gervin – 1978–1982
- David Robinson – 1991, 1992, 1995, 1996
- Tim Duncan – 1998–2005, 2007, 2013
- Kawhi Leonard – 2016, 2017
- Victor Wembanyama – 2026

All-NBA Second Team

- George Gervin – 1977, 1983
- Alvin Robertson – 1986
- David Robinson – 1994, 1998
- Tim Duncan – 2006, 2008, 2009
- Tony Parker – 2012–2014
- LaMarcus Aldridge – 2018

All-NBA Third Team

- David Robinson – 1990, 1993, 2000, 2001
- Dennis Rodman – 1995
- Tim Duncan – 2010, 2015
- Manu Ginóbili – 2008, 2011
- Tony Parker – 2009
- LaMarcus Aldridge – 2016

NBA All-Defensive First Team

- Alvin Robertson – 1987
- David Robinson – 1991, 1992, 1995, 1996
- Dennis Rodman – 1995
- Tim Duncan – 1999–2003, 2005, 2007, 2008
- Bruce Bowen – 2004–2008
- Kawhi Leonard – 2015–2017
- Victor Wembanyama – 2024, 2026

NBA All-Defensive Second Team

- George Johnson – 1981
- Alvin Robertson – 1986, 1988, 1989
- David Robinson – 1990, 1993, 1994, 1998
- Dennis Rodman – 1994
- Tim Duncan – 1998, 2004, 2006, 2009, 2010, 2013, 2015
- Bruce Bowen – 2002, 2003
- Kawhi Leonard – 2014
- Danny Green – 2017
- Dejounte Murray – 2018

NBA All-Rookie First Team

- Greg Anderson – 1988
- Willie Anderson – 1989
- David Robinson – 1990
- Tim Duncan – 1998
- Tony Parker – 2002
- Gary Neal – 2011
- Kawhi Leonard – 2012
- Victor Wembanyama – 2024
- Stephon Castle – 2025
- Dylan Harper – 2026

NBA All-Rookie Second Team

- Sean Elliott – 1990
- Manu Ginóbili – 2003
- DeJuan Blair – 2010
- Jeremy Sochan – 2023

=== NBA All-Star Weekend ===
NBA All-Star selections

- George Gervin – 1977–1985
- Larry Kenon – 1978, 1979
- Artis Gilmore – 1983, 1986
- Alvin Robertson – 1986–1988
- David Robinson – 1990–1996, 1998, 2000, 2001
- Sean Elliott – 1993, 1996
- Tim Duncan – 1998, 2000–2011, 2013, 2015
- Manu Ginóbili – 2005, 2011
- Tony Parker – 2006, 2007, 2009, 2012–2014
- Kawhi Leonard – 2016, 2017
- LaMarcus Aldridge – 2016, 2018, 2019
- Dejounte Murray – 2022
- Victor Wembanyama – 2025, 2026
- De'Aaron Fox – 2026

Slam Dunk Contest

- Edgar Jones – 1984
- Johnny Dawkins – 1987
- Greg Anderson – 1988
- Stephon Castle – 2025
- Carter Bryant – 2026

Three-Point Contest

- Dale Ellis – 1994
- Chuck Person – 1995
- Terry Porter – 2000
- Steve Smith – 2002
- Roger Mason – 2009
- Matt Bonner – 2013
- Marco Belinelli – 2014, 2015

NBA All-Star Game head coaches

- Gregg Popovich – 2005, 2011, 2013, 2016
- Mitch Johnson – 2026

NBA All-Star Game Most Valuable Player Award

- George Gervin – 1980
- Tim Duncan – 2000

Rising Stars Challenge

- Tony Parker – 2002, 2003
- Manu Ginobili – 2004
- Beno Udrih – 2005
- DeJuan Blair – 2010, 2011
- Gary Neal – 2011
- Kawhi Leonard – 2012, 2013
- Tiago Splitter – 2012
- Jonathon Simmons – 2017
- Keldon Johnson – 2021
- Jeremy Sochan - 2023, 2024
- Victor Wembanyama - 2024, 2025
- Stephon Castle – 2025, 2026
- Dylan Harper – 2026
- David Jones García – 2026
- Carter Bryant – 2026

Skills Challenge

- Tony Parker – 2003, 2009, 2012
- Victor Wembanyama - 2024, 2025
- Chris Paul - 2025

Shooting Stars Competition

- Manu Ginobili – 2004
- Tony Parker – 2006, 2007
- Tim Duncan – 2008, 2009
- Dylan Harper – 2026

=== ABA individual awards ===
ABA Coach of the Year Award

- Tom Nissalke – 1972

ABA Executive of the Year award

- Jack Ankerson – 1974

ABA Rookie of the Year Award

- Swen Nater – 1974

All-ABA First Team

- Donnie Freeman – 1972
- James Silas – 1976

All-ABA Second Team

- John Beasley – 1968, 1969
- Cincinnatus Powell – 1968
- Donnie Freeman – 1971
- Swen Nater – 1974, 1975
- George Gervin – 1975, 1976
- James Silas – 1975

ABA All-Rookie Team

- Ron Boone – 1969
- Joe Hamilton – 1971
- James Silas – 1973
- Swen Nater – 1974
- Mark Olberding – 1976

ABA All-Star Game Most Valuable Player Award

- John Beasley – 1969

ABA All-Star selections

- John Beasley – 1968–1970
- Cliff Hagan – 1968
- Glen Combs – 1970
- Cincinnatus Powell – 1970
- Donnie Freeman – 1971, 1972
- Steve Jones – 1972
- Rich Jones – 1973, 1974
- Swen Nater – 1974, 1975
- George Gervin – 1975, 1976
- James Silas – 1975, 1976
- Larry Kenon – 1976
- Billy Paultz – 1976

== Television ==
The San Antonio Spurs will begin airing regional broadcasts on DAZN for the 2026–27 season with 22 games airing on local over the air television. Before 2026, the Spurs primarily aired games on FanDuel Sports Network Southwest, though 9 games air via over-the-air television on KENS.

| Preceded by Chicago Bulls | NBA champions 1998–99 | Succeeded by Los Angeles Lakers |
| Preceded by Los Angeles Lakers | NBA champions 2002–03 | Succeeded by Detroit Pistons |
| Preceded by Detroit Pistons | NBA champions 2004–05 | Succeeded by Miami Heat |
| Preceded by Miami Heat | NBA champions 2006–07 | Succeeded by Boston Celtics |
| Preceded by Miami Heat | NBA champions 2013–14 | Succeeded by Golden State Warriors |
