= The Calhoun Shot =

Basketball shot made in a 1993 game

- Date: April 14, 1993
- Venue: Chicago Stadium
- Location: Chicago, Illinois, US
- Also known as: The Immaculate Connection
- Type: Promotional event
- Budget: $1 million
- Organized by: Chicago Bulls; Coca-Cola; Lettuce Entertain You
- Participants: Don Calhoun

The Calhoun Shot, also known as the Immaculate Connection, was a basketball shot made by spectator Don Calhoun during a timeout in the third quarter of the Chicago Bulls–Miami Heat game on April 14, 1993, in Chicago, Illinois, United States. The shot was part of a promotion that offered one million dollars to any fan who could make a 75-foot shot through the basket from the free-throw line at the opposite end of the court. At the time, Calhoun's shot was reportedly the first time anyone had ever made a three-quarters promotional shot. However, a spectator had succeeded in this shot in 1989, winning a car.

The insurance company that was required to make the payoff, American Hole 'N One Inc, voided the payment because Calhoun had played college basketball, a violation of the rules. However, the sponsors of the event, Coca-Cola, the Lettuce Entertain You restaurant group, and the Bulls, pledged to cover the prize if the insurance company would not. As a result, Calhoun got $50,000 a year over the next 20 years. The insurance company still benefited from the publicity. The shot, and news coverage it gained, are credited with the rise of similar promotions during sporting events.

== Contestant ==
Don Calhoun was, at the time, an office supplies salesman. He had played basketball for Bloomington High School and later Triton College during the 1988–1989 season. Following the shot, he signed a one-year contract with the Harlem Globetrotters.

He later continued to work with office supplies, earning approximately $38,000 (after taxes) every year until 2013. He characterized the money as nice, but not something that made him feel rich. Thirty years after making the shot, Calhoun lives in the Midwest, and has four children, one of whom became the first in his family to earn a college degree, and later a medical degree, partly thanks to his father's prize money.

As of 2023, the ball that was used to make the shot is in the possession of Calhoun's son, Dr. Clarence Calhoun II.
