= 2026–27 Charlotte Hornets season =

- Head coach: Charles Lee
- President: Fred Whitfield
- General manager: Jeff Peterson
- Owner(s): Gabe Plotkin; Rick Schnall
- Arena: Spectrum Center

Results
- Record: 4–11 (.267)
- Place: Division: 5th (Southeast); Conference: 12th (Eastern)
- Stats at Basketball Reference

Local media
- Television: Cox Media Group/Gray Media (Note: Affiliates include: WSOC-TV or WAXN-TV (Charlotte); WIS-DT4/WPAM-LD (Columbia); WCSC-DT3 (Charleston); WMYV (Greensboro); WITN-DT2 (Greenville-New Bern); WHNS-DT2 (Greenville-Spartanburg-Asheville-Anderson); WMBF-DT3 (Myrtle Beach); WRAL-DT3 (Raleigh); WECT-DT3 (Wilmington))
- Radio: WFNZ

The 2026–27 Charlotte Hornets season is the 37th season for the franchise in the National Basketball Association (NBA). This is the first time since the 2019–20 season that LaMelo Ball is not on the opening day roster, as he was traded to the Minnesota Timberwolves on July 10, 2026. Miles Bridges was also traded to the Phoenix Suns on July 13, after seven seasons with the Hornets.

The Hornets will retire Muggsy Bogues's jersey number 1 when they play the Milwaukee Bucks on February 11, 2027.

== Draft picks ==
Round	Pick	Player	Position	Nationality	College
1	14	Hannes Steinbach	PF	Germany	Washington
1	18	Christian Anderson	PG	United States	Texas Tech

The Hornets entered the draft holding two first-round selections: their original lottery pick that landed 14th and the 18th pick originally owned by the Orlando Magic. The latter was acquired from the Phoenix Suns at the 2025 trade deadline alongside Jusuf Nurkić and was ultimately conveyed because it became the least favorable of the four picks originally owned by Orlando, Phoenix and two other teams as Orlando finished with the best record of the four in the 2025–26 season. Their 2026 second-round pick, originally traded to the New York Knicks in 2021, was used by the Sacramento Kings in the draft as a replacement to Charlotte's first-round picks from 2022 to 2025 that did not convey due to lottery protections as they consistently missed the playoffs.

== Roster ==
Charlotte Hornets roster
Players

Pos.	No.	Player	Height	Weight	DOB	From
G	10	Michael Ajayi (TW)	6 ft 7 in (2.01 m)	245 lb (111 kg)	2003-05-23	Butler
G	8	Grayson Allen	6 ft 4 in (1.93 m)	198 lb (90 kg)	1995-10-08	Duke
G	5	Christian Anderson Jr.	6 ft 1 in (1.85 m)	165 lb (75 kg)	2006-04-02	Texas Tech
G	18	Kylan Boswell (TW)	6 ft 1 in (1.85 m)	200 lb (91 kg)	2005-04-28	Illinois
F	14	Moussa Diabaté	6 ft 10 in (2.08 m)	210 lb (95 kg)	2002-01-21	Michigan
C	16	PJ Hall (TW)	6 ft 9 in (2.06 m)	245 lb (111 kg)	2002-02-21	Clemson
G	4	Sion James	6 ft 5 in (1.96 m)	220 lb (100 kg)	2002-12-04	Duke
C	11	Ryan Kalkbrenner	7 ft 1 in (2.16 m)	256 lb (116 kg)	2002-01-17	Creighton
G/F	7	Kon Knueppel (injured)	6 ft 6 in (1.98 m)	215 lb (98 kg)	2005-08-03	Duke
F	33	Liam McNeeley	6 ft 8 in (2.03 m)	210 lb (95 kg)	2005-10-10	Connecticut
F	24	Brandon Miller	6 ft 7 in (2.01 m)	200 lb (91 kg)	2002-11-22	Alabama
F	00	Royce O'Neale	6 ft 6 in (1.98 m)	226 lb (103 kg)	1993-06-05	Baylor
F/C	0	Naz Reid	6 ft 9 in (2.06 m)	264 lb (120 kg)	1999-08-26	LSU
F	31	Tidjane Salaün	6 ft 10 in (2.08 m)	207 lb (94 kg)	2005-08-10	France
G	17	Dennis Schröder (injured)	6 ft 1 in (1.85 m)	175 lb (79 kg)	1993-09-15	Germany
F	22	Hannes Steinbach (GL)	6 ft 10 in (2.08 m)	248 lb (112 kg)	2006-05-01	Washington
F	2	Grant Williams	6 ft 7 in (2.01 m)	236 lb (107 kg)	1998-11-30	Tennessee
G	3	Coby White	6 ft 5 in (1.96 m)	210 lb (95 kg)	2000-2-16	North Carolina

Coaches
Head coach
- Charles Lee
Assistant(s)
- Jermaine Bucknor
- Ryan Frazier
- Matt Hill
- Josh Longstaff
- Blaine Mueller
- Kyle Neptune
- Zach Peterson
- Lamar Skeeter

Legend
- (DP) Unsigned draft pick
- (FA) Free agent
- (S) Suspended
- (GL) On assignment to G League affiliate
- (TW) Two-way affiliate player
- Injured

Roster
Updated: October 17, 2026

== Standings ==
=== Division ===
Southeast Division	W	L	PCT	GB	Home	Road	Div	GP
Miami Heat	9	6	.600	–	5‍–‍3	4‍–‍3	1–1	15
Atlanta Hawks	9	6	.600	–	3‍–‍3	6‍–‍3	4–1	15
Orlando Magic	6	8	.429	2.5	1‍–‍5	5‍–‍3	0–2	14
Washington Wizards	5	11	.313	4.5	2‍–‍5	3‍–‍6	2–3	16
Charlotte Hornets	4	10	.286	4.5	3‍–‍4	1‍–‍6	2–2	14

=== Conference ===
Eastern Conference
#	Team	W	L	PCT	GB	GP
1	Philadelphia 76ers *	13	3	.813	–	16
2	Boston Celtics	11	4	.733	1.5	15
3	Detroit Pistons *	10	4	.714	2.0	14
4	Miami Heat *	9	6	.600	3.5	15
5	Atlanta Hawks	9	6	.600	3.5	15
6	New York Knicks	9	6	.600	3.5	15
7	Cleveland Cavaliers	8	8	.500	5.0	16
8	Orlando Magic	6	8	.429	6.0	14
9	Toronto Raptors	5	10	.333	7.5	15
10	Indiana Pacers	5	10	.333	7.5	15
11	Washington Wizards	5	11	.313	8.0	16
12	Charlotte Hornets	4	10	.286	8.0	14
13	Chicago Bulls	4	10	.286	8.0	14
14	Brooklyn Nets	3	11	.214	9.0	14
15	Milwaukee Bucks	1	15	.063	12.0	16

== Game log ==
=== Preseason ===
2026 preseason game log
Total: 1–3 (Home: 1–1; Road: 0–2)
Preseason: 1–3 (home: 1–1; road: 0–2)

Game	Date	Team	Score	High points	High rebounds	High assists	Location Attendance	Record
1	October 6	Brooklyn	L 90–124	Liam McNeeley (14)	Tied (4)	Royce O'Neal (5)	Spectrum Center; 10,922	0–1
2	October 11	Milwaukee	W 105–90	Brandon Miller (18)	Moussa Diabaté (11)	Liam McNeeley (5)	Spectrum Center; 10,931	1–1
3	October 14	@ Boston	L 93–114	Miller, Salaün (16)	Naz Reid (6)	Sion James (4)	TD Garden; 19,156	1–2
4	October 16	@ Memphis	L 98–117	Hannes Steinbach (19)	Hannes Steinbach (10)	Christian Anderson Jr. (6)	FedExForum; 10,087	1–3

2026–27 preseason schedule

=== Regular season ===
2026–27 game log
Total: 4–11 (Home: 3–4; Road: 1–7)
October: 3–4 (home: 2–2; road: 1–2)

Game	Date	Team	Score	High points	High rebounds	High assists	Location Attendance	Record
1	October 21	@ Brooklyn	W 110–103	Grayson Allen (21)	Naz Reid (11)	Naz Reid (7)	Barclays Center; 17,548	1–0
2	October 23	Atlanta	L 81–128	Naz Reid (17)	Moussa Diabaté (8)	Sion James (5)	Spectrum Center; 19,524	1–1
3	October 24	Miami	W 115–110	Brandon Miller (34)	Naz Reid (9)	Allen, James (5)	Spectrum Center; 19,611	2–1
4	October 26	Washington	W 110–103	Brandon Miller (39)	Moussa Diabaté (17)	Dennis Schröder (5)	Spectrum Center; 17,949	3–1
5	October 28	@ Detroit	L 89–97	Brandon Miller (31)	Brandon Miller (12)	Dennis Schröder (5)	Little Caesars Arena; 19,023	3–2
6	October 30	@ Washington	L 79–95	Brandon Miller (19)	Moussa Diabaté (11)	Dennis Schröder (8)	Capital One Arena; 17,566	3–3
7	October 31	Philadelphia	L 104–109	Grayson Allen (27)	Moussa Diabaté (8)	Dennis Schröder (7)	Spectrum Center; 19,533	3–4

November: 1–7 (home: 1–2; road: 0–5)

Game	Date	Team	Score	High points	High rebounds	High assists	Location Attendance	Record
8	November 2	Detroit	L 91–124	Brandon Miller (17)	Moussa Diabaté (9)	Brandon Miller (4)	Spectrum Center; 18,760	3–5
9	November 4	@ Brooklyn	L 104–114	Naz Reid (28)	Naz Reid (9)	Allen, Schröder (4)	Barclays Center; 16,943	3–6
10	November 6	Boston	L 80–119	Naz Reid (14)	Hannes Steinbach (11)	Christian Anderson Jr. (5)	Spectrum Center; 19,586	3–7
11	November 9	Cleveland	W 124–112	Grayson Allen (27)	Ryan Kalkbrenner (15)	Coby White (9)	Spectrum Center; 17, 471	4–7
12	November 12	@ Phoenix	L 96–101	Coby White (21)	Moussa Diabaté (13)	Grayson Allen (6)	Mortgage Matchup Center; 17,071	4–8
13	November 15	@ L.A. Clippers	L 105–113	Coby White (21)	Moussa Diabaté (12)	Tied (4)	Intuit Dome; 17,487	4–9
14	November 17	@ L.A. Lakers	L 114–118 (OT)	Brandon Miller (28)	Moussa Diabaté (16)	Tied (4)	Crypto.com Arena; 19,057	4–10
15	November 20	@ Atlanta	L 97–111	Moussa Diabaté (21)	Moussa Diabaté (15)	Coby White (9)	State Farm Arena; 15,488	4–11
16	November 23	Memphis					Spectrum Center	–
17	November 25	Chicago					Spectrum Center	–
18	November 28	Brooklyn					Spectrum Center	–
19	November 30	Washington					Spectrum Center	–

December: 0–0 (home: 0–0; road: 0–0)

Game	Date	Team	Score	High points	High rebounds	High assists	Location Attendance	Record
20	December 2	@ Boston					TD Garden	–
21	TBD	TBD					TBD	–
22	TBD	TBD					TBD	–
23	December 12	@ Washington					Capital One Arena	–
24	December 14	Toronto					Spectrum Center	–
25	December 16	L.A. Clippers					Spectrum Center	–
26	December 18	Oklahoma City					Spectrum Center	–
27	December 19	Portland					Spectrum Center	–
28	December 21	Philadelphia					Spectrum Center	–
29	December 23	@ Orlando					Kia Center	–
30	December 26	@ Atlanta					State Farm Arena	–
31	December 27	@ Miami					Kaseya Center	–
32	December 29	Orlando					Spectrum Center	–
33	December 31	San Antonio					Spectrum Center	–

January: 0–0 (home: 0–0; road: 0–0)

Game	Date	Team	Score	High points	High rebounds	High assists	Location Attendance	Record
34	January 2	Cleveland					Spectrum Center	–
35	January 3	@ Milwaukee					Fiserv Forum	–
36	January 5	Atlanta					Spectrum Center	–
37	January 7	Denver					Spectrum Center	–
38	January 9	@ Portland					Moda Center	–
39	January 10	@ Sacramento					Golden 1 Center	–
40	January 13	@ Golden State					Chase Center	–
41	January 14	@ Utah					Delta Center	–
42	January 16	@ Denver					Ball Arena	–
43	January 19	@ Dallas					American Airlines Center	–
44	January 22	Houston					Spectrum Center	–
45	January 23	@ Boston					TD Garden	–
46	January 25	Orlando					Spectrum Center	–
47	January 27	@ San Antonio					Frost Bank Center	–
48	January 29	@ Minnesota					Target Center	–
49	January 31	L.A. Lakers					Spectrum Center	–

February: 0–0 (home: 0–0; road: 0–0)

Game	Date	Team	Score	High points	High rebounds	High assists	Location Attendance	Record
50	February 2	@ Miami					Kaseya Center	–
51	February 4	Boston					Spectrum Center	–
52	February 5	Golden State					Spectrum Center	–
53	February 7	@ Toronto					Scotiabank Arena	–
54	February 9	@ New York					Madison Square Garden	–
55	February 11	Milwaukee					Spectrum Center	–
56	February 13	Dallas					Spectrum Center	–
57	February 15	Minnesota					Spectrum Center	–
58	February 17	Toronto					Spectrum Center	–
All-Star Game
59	February 25	@ Orlando					Kia Center	–
60	February 26	@ Houston					Toyota Center	–
61	February 28	Sacramento					Spectrum Center	–

March: 0–0 (home: 0–0; road: 0–0)

Game	Date	Team	Score	High points	High rebounds	High assists	Location Attendance	Record
62	March 3	@ Philadelphia					Xfinity Mobile Arena	–
63	March 6	@ Chicago					United Center	–
64	March 8	@ Indiana					Gainbridge Fieldhouse	–
65	March 10	New Orleans					Spectrum Center	–
66	March 11	Indiana					Spectrum Center	–
67	March 13	Phoenix					Spectrum Center	–
68	March 16	@ Oklahoma City					Paycom Center	–
69	March 18	@ New Orleans					Smoothie King Center	–
70	March 20	@ Detroit					Little Caesars Arena	–
71	March 22	@ Memphis					FedExForum	–
72	March 24	Detroit					Spectrum Center	–
73	March 26	New York					Spectrum Center	–
74	March 28	Utah					Spectrum Center	–
75	March 30	Miami					Spectrum Center	–

April: 0–0 (home: 0–0; road: 0–0)

Game	Date	Team	Score	High points	High rebounds	High assists	Location Attendance	Record
76	April 1	@ New York					Madison Square Garden	–
77	April 2	@ Milwaukee					Fiserv Forum	–
78	April 4	@ Cleveland					Rocket Arena	–
79	April 6	Indiana					Spectrum Center	–
80	April 7	@ Chicago					United Center	–
81	April 9	Brooklyn					Spectrum Center	–
82	April 11	@ Philadelphia					Xfinity Mobile Arena	–

2026–27 season schedule

== NBA Cup ==
=== East Group C ===
Pos	Team	Pld	W	L	PF	PA	PD	Qualification
1	Boston Celtics	2	2	0	244	191	+53	Advance to knockout stage
2	Atlanta Hawks	3	2	1	360	339	+21	Possible knockout stage based on ranking
3	Washington Wizards	3	2	1	325	312	+13	
4	Chicago Bulls	3	1	2	315	333	−18	
5	Charlotte Hornets	3	0	3	256	325	−69	

Updated to game(s) played on November 20, 2026. Source:

== Transactions ==
=== Trades ===
Date	Trade		Ref.
July 7, 2026	To Charlotte Hornets: Dorian Finney-Smith; 2027 MEM second-round pick; 2028 HOU second-round pick; 2033 HOU second-round pick	To Houston Rockets: Cash considerations	
July 10, 2026	Four-team trade		
July 10, 2026	To Brooklyn Nets: Julius Randle (from Minnesota); Draft rights to Joshua Jefferson (No. 28) (from Minnesota)	To Charlotte Hornets: Mouhamadou Gueye (from Chicago); Naz Reid (from Minnesota); Draft rights to Matteo Spagnolo (2022 No. 50) (from Minnesota); 2028 first-round pick swap right (Note: Charlotte may swap its own pick for Minnesota's own pick.) (from Minnesota); 2029 first-round pick swap right (Note: Charlotte may swap its own pick for Minnesota's pick if it falls No. 1–5.) (from Minnesota); 2029 MIN second-round pick (from Minnesota); 2030 first-round pick swap right (Note: Through earlier trades, Minnesota will retain its own pick or receive the pick originally belonging to Dallas and San Antonio, if Minnesota's pick falls No. 2–30; Charlotte may swap its own pick for whichever pick Minnesota has afterward.) (from Minnesota); 2032 MIN second-round pick (from Minnesota); 2033 MIN first-round pick (from Minnesota); 2033 MIN second-round pick (from Minnesota)	
July 10, 2026	To Chicago Bulls: Nic Claxton (from Brooklyn)	To Minnesota Timberwolves: LaMelo Ball (from Charlotte); Josh Green (from Charlotte); Draft rights to Isaiah Evans (No. 33) (from Brooklyn)	
July 13, 2026	To Charlotte Hornets: Grayson Allen; Royce O'Neale; 2033 PHX first-round pick	To Phoenix Suns: Miles Bridges; 2027 second-round pick (Note: The less favorable of the picks originally belonging to Boston and Orlando.); 2029 protected first-round pick (Note: The least favorable of the picks originally belonging to Cleveland, Minnesota, and Utah. The Minnesota pick is only conveyable if No. 6–30; whether this protection also applies to the Cleveland and Utah picks is ambiguous.)	
August 20, 2026
August 20, 2026	Five-team trade		
August 20, 2026	To Charlotte Hornets: Dennis Schröder (from Cleveland); Cash considerations (from Cleveland)	To Cleveland Cavaliers: Peyton Watson (sign-and-trade) (from Denver); Cam Whitmore (from Washington); Draft rights to Ismaël Kamagate (2022 No. 46) (from Los Angeles)	
August 20, 2026	To Denver Nuggets: Julian Reese (two-way contract) (from Washington); 2031 CLE first-round pick (from Cleveland); 2032 SAC second-round pick (from Cleveland)	To Los Angeles Clippers: Max Strus (from Cleveland)	
August 20, 2026	To Washington Wizards: Tre Mann (from Charlotte); 2027 second-round pick (Note: Los Angeles Clippers will receive the second most favorable pick out of three possibilities: 1) the most favorable of the picks originally belonging to Houston Rockets, Indiana Pacers, Miami Heat, and Oklahoma City Thunder; 2) the more favorable of the picks originally belonging to Golden State Warriors and Phoenix Suns; 3) Philadelphia 76ers' own pick.) (from Los Angeles); Cash considerations (from Cleveland)		
September 22, 2026	To Charlotte Hornets: Buddy Hield; Ryan Nembhard; Cash considerations	To Atlanta Hawks: Dorian Finney-Smith	
September 27, 2026	To Charlotte Hornets: Rob Dillingham	To Chicago Bulls: Buddy Hield; Cash considerations	

=== Free agency ===
==== Re-signed ====
Date	Player	Ref.
July 6, 2026	Coby White	

==== Additions ====
Date	Player	Former Team	Ref.

==== Subtractions ====
Player	Reason	New Team	Ref.
Xavier Tillman	Free agency	(Turkey) Trabzonspor	
Mouhamadou Gueye	Waived	(Spain) Valencia Basket	
Tosan Evbuomwan	Free agency	(Spain) Barcelona	
