= 2026–27 Cleveland Cavaliers season =

- Head coach: Kenny Atkinson
- President: Koby Altman
- General manager: Vacant
- Owner: Dan Gilbert
- Arena: Rocket Arena

Results
- Record: 9–8 (.529)
- Place: Division: 2nd (Central); Conference: 7th (Eastern)
- Stats at Basketball Reference

Local media
- Television: DAZN; Rock Entertainment Sports Network (15 simulcasts)
- Radio: WTAM · WMMS

The 2026–27 Cleveland Cavaliers season is the 57th season for the franchise in the National Basketball Association (NBA).

== Draft picks ==
| Round | Pick | Player | Position | Nationality | College |
|---|---|---|---|---|---|
| 1 | 29 | Alex Karaban | SF | United States | UConn |

The Cavaliers entered the draft holding one first-round selection, which originally belonged to the San Antonio Spurs and acquired from a first-round swap with the Atlanta Hawks as part of a 2025 trade, triggered when San Antonio finished with a better record than Atlanta in the 2025–26 season. The team had traded their original second-round pick to the Los Angeles Clippers in February 2026 as part of a deal to acquire James Harden.

They used their only selection to select Alex Karaban, but soon traded his draft rights to the Sacramento Kings for the draft rights to the 34th pick, Meleek Thomas, and a 2032 second-round pick.

== Roster ==
Cleveland Cavaliers roster
Players

| Pos. | No. | Player | Height | Weight | DOB | From |
|---|---|---|---|---|---|---|
| C | 31 | Jarrett Allen | 6 ft 9 in (2.06 m) | 250 lb (113 kg) | 1998-04-21 | Texas |
| G | 55 | Zack Austin (TW) | 6 ft 5 in (1.96 m) | 215 lb (98 kg) | 2001-08-11 | Pittsburgh |
| F/C | 3 | Thomas Bryant | 6 ft 9 in (2.06 m) | 260 lb (118 kg) | 1997-07-31 | Indiana |
| C | 18 | Khalifa Diop | 6 ft 10 in (2.08 m) | 231 lb (105 kg) | 2002-01-15 | Senegal |
| G | 1 | James Harden | 6 ft 4 in (1.93 m) | 220 lb (100 kg) | 1989-08-26 | Arizona State |
| G/F | 33 | Mario Hezonja | 6 ft 8 in (2.03 m) | 255 lb (116 kg) | 1995-02-25 | Croatia |
| G | 5 | Sam Merrill | 6 ft 4 in (1.93 m) | 195 lb (88 kg) | 1996-05-15 | Utah State |
| G | 45 | Donovan Mitchell | 6 ft 2 in (1.88 m) | 228 lb (103 kg) | 1996-09-07 | Louisville |
| C | 4 | Evan Mobley (injured) | 6 ft 11 in (2.11 m) | 230 lb (104 kg) | 2001-06-18 | USC |
| F | 77 | Norchad Omier (TW) | 6 ft 5 in (1.96 m) | 248 lb (112 kg) | 2001-08-28 | Baylor |
| G | 9 | Craig Porter Jr. | 6 ft 1 in (1.85 m) | 194 lb (88 kg) | 2000-02-26 | Wichita State |
| G | 24 | Tyrese Proctor | 6 ft 4 in (1.93 m) | 185 lb (84 kg) | 2004-04-01 | Duke |
| G | 15 | Meleek Thomas | 6 ft 3 in (1.91 m) | 190 lb (86 kg) | 2006-08-06 | Arkansas |
| F | 35 | Nae'Qwan Tomlin (injured) | 6 ft 8 in (2.03 m) | 210 lb (95 kg) | 2000-12-10 | Memphis |
| G/F | 20 | Jaylon Tyson | 6 ft 6 in (1.98 m) | 224 lb (102 kg) | 2002-12-02 | California |
| C | 88 | Ernest Udeh Jr. (TW) | 6 ft 9 in (2.06 m) | 266 lb (121 kg) | 2004-01-08 | Miami (FL) |
| G | 8 | Peyton Watson | 6 ft 7 in (2.01 m) | 215 lb (98 kg) | 2002-09-11 | UCLA |

Coaches
Head coach
- Kenny Atkinson
Assistant(s)
- Johnnie Bryant (associate HC)
- Omar Cook
- Mike Gerrity
- Trevor Hendry
- Andrew Olson
- Nate Reinking
- Jawad Williams

Legend
- (DP) Unsigned draft pick
- (FA) Free agent
- (S) Suspended
- (GL) On assignment to G League affiliate
- (TW) Two-way affiliate player
- Injured

Roster
Updated: November 18, 2026

== Standings ==
=== Division ===
| Central Division | W | L | PCT | GB | Home | Road | Div | GP |
|---|---|---|---|---|---|---|---|---|
| Detroit Pistons | 10 | 4 | .714 | – | 3‍–‍2 | 7‍–‍2 | 0–0 | 14 |
| Cleveland Cavaliers | 8 | 8 | .500 | 3.0 | 6‍–‍3 | 2‍–‍5 | 2–0 | 16 |
| Indiana Pacers | 5 | 10 | .333 | 5.5 | 2‍–‍6 | 3‍–‍4 | 0–1 | 15 |
| Chicago Bulls | 4 | 10 | .286 | 6.0 | 1‍–‍4 | 3‍–‍6 | 1–1 | 14 |
| Milwaukee Bucks | 1 | 15 | .063 | 10.0 | 1‍–‍8 | 0‍–‍7 | 1–2 | 16 |

=== Conference ===
Eastern Conference
| # | Team | W | L | PCT | GB | GP |
|---|---|---|---|---|---|---|
| 1 | Philadelphia 76ers * | 13 | 3 | .813 | – | 16 |
| 2 | Boston Celtics | 11 | 4 | .733 | 1.5 | 15 |
| 3 | Detroit Pistons * | 10 | 4 | .714 | 2.0 | 14 |
| 4 | Miami Heat * | 9 | 6 | .600 | 3.5 | 15 |
| 5 | Atlanta Hawks | 9 | 6 | .600 | 3.5 | 15 |
| 6 | New York Knicks | 9 | 6 | .600 | 3.5 | 15 |
| 7 | Cleveland Cavaliers | 8 | 8 | .500 | 5.0 | 16 |
| 8 | Orlando Magic | 6 | 8 | .429 | 6.0 | 14 |
| 9 | Toronto Raptors | 5 | 10 | .333 | 7.5 | 15 |
| 10 | Indiana Pacers | 5 | 10 | .333 | 7.5 | 15 |
| 11 | Washington Wizards | 5 | 11 | .313 | 8.0 | 16 |
| 12 | Charlotte Hornets | 4 | 10 | .286 | 8.0 | 14 |
| 13 | Chicago Bulls | 4 | 10 | .286 | 8.0 | 14 |
| 14 | Brooklyn Nets | 3 | 11 | .214 | 9.0 | 14 |
| 15 | Milwaukee Bucks | 1 | 15 | .063 | 12.0 | 16 |

== Game log ==
=== Preseason ===
2026 preseason game log
Total: 1–2 (Home: 1–1; Road: 0–1)
Preseason: 1–2 (home: 1–1; road: 0–1)

| Game | Date | Team | Score | High points | High rebounds | High assists | Location Attendance | Record |
|---|---|---|---|---|---|---|---|---|
| 1 | October 8 | Boston | L 113–124 | Jaylon Tyson (14) | Mario Hezonja (5) | Craig Porter Jr. (10) | Rocket Arena; 15,464 | 0–1 |
| 2 | October 11 | Orlando | W 119–105 | James Harden (24) | Allen, Mobley (7) | Donovan Mitchell (6) | Rocket Arena; 14,861 | 1–1 |
| 3 | October 13 | @ Orlando | L 116–132 | Meleek Thomas (16) | Allen, Hezonja (6) | Donovan Mitchell (8) | Kia Center; 16,468 | 1–2 |

2026–27 preseason schedule

=== Regular season ===
2026–27 game log
Total: 9–8 (Home: 7–3; Road: 2–5)
October: 4–2 (home: 3–0; road: 1–2)

| Game | Date | Team | Score | High points | High rebounds | High assists | Location Attendance | Record |
|---|---|---|---|---|---|---|---|---|
| 1 | October 22 | @ Philadelphia | L 106–114 | Donovan Mitchell (32) | Donovan Mitchell (10) | James Harden (5) | Xfinity Mobile Arena; 21,423 | 0–1 |
| 2 | October 24 | Brooklyn | W 125–121 | Donovan Mitchell (22) | Evan Mobley (10) | James Harden (7) | Rocket Arena; 19,432 | 1–1 |
| 3 | October 26 | Minnesota | W 127–125 (OT) | Donovan Mitchell (26) | Allen, Mobley (9) | James Harden (9) | Rocket Arena; 19,432 | 2–1 |
| 4 | October 28 | Washington | W 121–111 | Evan Mobley (24) | Allen, Mobley (12) | Donovan Mitchell (7) | Rocket Arena; 19,432 | 3–1 |
| 5 | October 29 | @ Atlanta | L 111–114 | James Harden (24) | Jarrett Allen (8) | Evan Mobley (7) | State Farm Arena; 15,025 | 3–2 |
| 6 | October 31 | @ Milwaukee | W 136–111 | Evan Mobley (27) | Allen, Hezonja (11) | James Harden (7) | Fiserv Forum; 12,572 | 4–2 |

November: 5–6 (home: 4–3; road: 1–3)

| Game | Date | Team | Score | High points | High rebounds | High assists | Location Attendance | Record |
|---|---|---|---|---|---|---|---|---|
| 7 | November 2 | Oklahoma City | L 112–117 | Mitchell, Thomas (16) | Mario Hezonja (8) | Donovan Mitchell (11) | Rocket Arena; 19,432 | 4–3 |
| 8 | November 4 | @ Oklahoma City | L 116–124 | Donovan Mitchell (27) | Evan Mobley (10) | Harden, Mitchell (6) | Paycom Center; 18,203 | 4–4 |
| 9 | November 6 | Philadelphia | W 119–95 | Donovan Mitchell (23) | Mario Hezonja (10) | Donovan Mitchell (8) | Rocket Arena; 19,432 | 5–4 |
| 10 | November 7 | New York | L 97–109 | Donovan Mitchell (37) | Evan Mobley (9) | Harden, Mobley (5) | Rocket Arena; 19,432 | 5–5 |
| 11 | November 9 | @ Charlotte | L 112–124 | Peyton Watson (13) | Jarrett Allen (7) | James Harden (5) | Spectrum Center; 17,471 | 5–6 |
| 12 | November 11 | @ New York | W 115–107 | James Harden (32) | Jarrett Allen (14) | Donovan Mitchell (6) | Madison Square Garden; 19,812 | 6–6 |
| 13 | November 13 | @ Miami | L 121–133 | Donovan Mitchell (25) | Jarrett Allen (8) | James Harden (8) | Kaseya Center; 19,646 | 6–7 |
| 14 | November 14 | Dallas | W 127–117 | Tyrese Proctor (24) | Bryant, Proctor (11) | Tyrese Proctor (10) | Rocket Arena; 19,432 | 7–7 |
| 15 | November 16 | Chicago | W 126–115 | Donovan Mitchell (39) | Jarrett Allen (14) | James Harden (10) | Rocket Arena; 19,432 | 8–7 |
| 16 | November 18 | Memphis | L 121–124 | Donovan Mitchell (34) | Jarrett Allen (9) | James Harden (9) | Rocket Arena; 19,432 | 8–8 |
| 17 | November 20 | Indiana | W 128–119 | James Harden (51) | Mario Hezonja (10) | James Harden (6) | Rocket Arena; 19,432 | 9–8 |
| 18 | November 23 | @ Chicago | | | | | United Center | – |
| 19 | November 25 | @ New York | | | | | Madison Square Garden | – |
| 20 | November 29 | Miami | | | | | Rocket Arena | – |

December: 0–0 (home: 0–0; road: 0–0)

| Game | Date | Team | Score | High points | High rebounds | High assists | Location Attendance | Record |
|---|---|---|---|---|---|---|---|---|
| 21 | December 1 | Indiana | | | | | Rocket Arena | – |
| 22 | December 3 | @ Chicago | | | | | United Center | – |
| 23 | TBD | TBD | | | | | TBD | – |
| 24 | TBD | TBD | | | | | TBD | – |
| 25 | December 12 | Golden State | | | | | Rocket Arena | – |
| 26 | December 15 | San Antonio | | | | | Rocket Arena | – |
| 27 | December 16 | @ Orlando | | | | | Kia Center | – |
| 28 | December 18 | @ Detroit | | | | | Little Caesars Arena | – |
| 29 | December 20 | Utah | | | | | Rocket Arena | – |
| 30 | December 21 | New York | | | | | Rocket Arena | – |
| 31 | December 23 | @ Washington | | | | | Capital One Arena | – |
| 32 | December 27 | Washington | | | | | Rocket Arena | – |
| 33 | December 28 | @ Boston | | | | | TD Garden | – |
| 34 | December 31 | L.A. Clippers | | | | | Rocket Arena | – |

January: 0–0 (home: 0–0; road: 0–0)

| Game | Date | Team | Score | High points | High rebounds | High assists | Location Attendance | Record |
|---|---|---|---|---|---|---|---|---|
| 35 | January 2 | @ Charlotte | | | | | Spectrum Center | – |
| 36 | January 3 | @ Houston | | | | | Toyota Center | – |
| 37 | January 5 | Toronto | | | | | Rocket Arena | – |
| 38 | January 7 | @ Orlando | | | | | Kia Center | – |
| 39 | January 9 | Denver | | | | | Rocket Arena | – |
| 40 | January 11 | @ Minnesota | | | | | Target Center | – |
| 41 | January 13 | @ Atlanta | | | | | State Farm Arena | – |
| 42 | January 15 | @ Milwaukee | | | | | Fiserv Forum | – |
| 43 | January 16 | @ Memphis | | | | | FedExForum | – |
| 44 | January 18 | Detroit | | | | | Rocket Arena | – |
| 45 | January 21 | @ Brooklyn | | | | | Barclays Center | – |
| 46 | January 23 | @ Dallas | | | | | American Airlines Center | – |
| 47 | January 25 | @ New Orleans | | | | | Smoothie King Center | – |
| 48 | January 27 | Detroit | | | | | Rocket Arena | – |
| 49 | January 29 | @ Toronto | | | | | Scotiabank Arena | – |
| 50 | January 30 | New Orleans | | | | | Rocket Arena | – |

February: 0–0 (home: 0–0; road: 0–0)

| Game | Date | Team | Score | High points | High rebounds | High assists | Location Attendance | Record |
|---|---|---|---|---|---|---|---|---|
| 51 | February 1 | @ Utah | | | | | Delta Center | – |
| 52 | February 3 | @ Phoenix | | | | | Mortgage Matchup Center | – |
| 53 | February 4 | @ Portland | | | | | Moda Center | – |
| 54 | February 6 | Orlando | | | | | Rocket Arena | – |
| 55 | February 9 | Toronto | | | | | Rocket Arena | – |
| 56 | February 10 | @ Indiana | | | | | Gainbridge Fieldhouse | – |
| 57 | February 12 | @ Toronto | | | | | Scotiabank Arena | – |
| 58 | February 14 | Phoenix | | | | | Rocket Arena | – |
| 59 | February 16 | Milwaukee | | | | | Rocket Arena | – |
| 60 | February 17 | Milwaukee | | | | | Rocket Arena | – |
All-Star Game
| 61 | February 25 | Sacramento | | | | | Rocket Arena | – |
| 62 | February 26 | @ Boston | | | | | TD Garden | – |

March: 0–0 (home: 0–0; road: 0–0)

| Game | Date | Team | Score | High points | High rebounds | High assists | Location Attendance | Record |
|---|---|---|---|---|---|---|---|---|
| 63 | March 1 | Philadelphia | | | | | Rocket Arena | – |
| 64 | March 4 | Portland | | | | | Rocket Arena | – |
| 65 | March 6 | Atlanta | | | | | Rocket Arena | – |
| 66 | March 9 | @ Detroit | | | | | Little Caesars Arena | – |
| 67 | March 11 | @ L.A. Clippers | | | | | Intuit Dome | – |
| 68 | March 12 | @ L.A. Lakers | | | | | Crypto.com Arena | – |
| 69 | March 14 | @ Sacramento | | | | | Golden 1 Center | – |
| 70 | March 16 | @ Golden State | | | | | Chase Center | – |
| 71 | March 18 | @ Denver | | | | | Ball Arena | – |
| 72 | March 20 | Chicago | | | | | Rocket Arena | – |
| 73 | March 22 | Houston | | | | | Rocket Arena | – |
| 74 | March 25 | L.A. Lakers | | | | | Rocket Arena | – |
| 75 | March 29 | Miami | | | | | Rocket Arena | – |
| 76 | March 31 | @ Brooklyn | | | | | Barclays Center | – |

April: 0–0 (home: 0–0; road: 0–0)

| Game | Date | Team | Score | High points | High rebounds | High assists | Location Attendance | Record |
|---|---|---|---|---|---|---|---|---|
| 77 | April 1 | Boston | | | | | Rocket Arena | – |
| 78 | April 4 | Charlotte | | | | | Rocket Arena | – |
| 79 | April 5 | Brooklyn | | | | | Rocket Arena | – |
| 80 | April 7 | @ San Antonio | | | | | Frost Bank Center | – |
| 81 | April 9 | @ Indiana | | | | | Gainbridge Fieldhouse | – |
| 82 | April 11 | Atlanta | | | | | Rocket Arena | – |

2026–27 season schedule

== NBA Cup ==
=== East Group B ===
| Pos | Team | Pld | W | L | PF | PA | PD | Qualification |
|---|---|---|---|---|---|---|---|---|
| 1 | Miami Heat | 2 | 2 | 0 | 278 | 246 | +32 | Advance to knockout stage |
| 2 | Cleveland Cavaliers | 3 | 2 | 1 | 368 | 347 | +21 | Possible knockout stage based on ranking |
| 3 | Philadelphia 76ers | 2 | 1 | 1 | 193 | 212 | −19 | |
| 4 | Indiana Pacers | 3 | 1 | 2 | 350 | 377 | −27 | |
| 5 | New York Knicks | 2 | 0 | 2 | 197 | 204 | −7 | |

Updated to game(s) played on November 20, 2026. Source:

== Transactions ==
=== Trades ===
| Date | Trade | | Ref. |
|---|---|---|---|
| June 23, 2026 | To Cleveland Cavaliers: 2026 SAC second-round pick (No. 34); 2032 SAC second-round pick | To Sacramento Kings: Draft rights to Alex Karaban (No. 29) | |
August 20, 2026
| August 20, 2026 | Five-team trade | | |
| August 20, 2026 | To Charlotte Hornets: Dennis Schröder (from Cleveland); Cash considerations (from Cleveland) | To Cleveland Cavaliers: Peyton Watson (sign-and-trade) (from Denver); Cam Whitmore (from Washington); Draft rights to Ismaël Kamagate (2022 No. 46) (from Los Angeles) | |
| August 20, 2026 | To Denver Nuggets: Julian Reese (two-way contract) (from Washington); 2031 CLE first-round pick (from Cleveland); 2032 SAC second-round pick (from Cleveland) | To Los Angeles Clippers: Max Strus (from Cleveland) | |
| August 20, 2026 | To Washington Wizards: Tre Mann (from Charlotte); 2027 second-round pick (Note: Los Angeles Clippers will receive the second most favorable pick out of three possibilities: 1) the most favorable of the picks originally belonging to Houston Rockets, Indiana Pacers, Miami Heat, and Oklahoma City Thunder; 2) the more favorable of the picks originally belonging to Golden State Warriors and Phoenix Suns; 3) Philadelphia 76ers' own pick.) (from Los Angeles); Cash considerations (from Cleveland) | | |

=== Free agency ===
==== Re-signed ====
| Date | Player | Ref. |
|---|---|---|
| July 7, 2026 | Thomas Bryant | |
| September 8, 2026 | James Harden | |

==== Additions ====
| Date | Player | Former Team | Ref. |
|---|---|---|---|
| July 31, 2026 | Mario Hezonja | (Spain) Real Madrid | |

==== Subtractions ====
| Player | Reason | New Team | Ref. |
|---|---|---|---|
| Dean Wade | Free agency | Philadelphia 76ers | |
| Larry Nance Jr. | Free agency | Indiana Pacers | |
| Keon Ellis | Free agency | Brooklyn Nets | |
| Olivier Sarr | Free agency | (Spain) Real Madrid | |
