= 2026–27 Brooklyn Nets season =

- Head coach: Jordi Fernández
- General manager: Sean Marks
- Owners: Joseph Tsai
- Arena: Barclays Center

Results
- Record: 3–12 (.200)
- Place: Division: 5th (Atlantic); Conference: 14th (Eastern)
- Stats at Basketball Reference

Local media
- Television: YES Network
- Radio: WFAN-AM • WFAN-FM

The 2026–27 Brooklyn Nets season is the 51st season of the franchise in the National Basketball Association (NBA), 60th season overall, and its 15th season playing in the New York City borough of Brooklyn.

== Draft picks ==
| Round | Pick | Player | Position | Nationality | College |
|---|---|---|---|---|---|
| 1 | 6 | Mikel Brown Jr. | PG | United States | Louisville |
| 2 | 33 | Isaiah Evans | SF | United States | Duke |
| 2 | 43 | Tyler Bilodeau | PF | United States | UCLA |

The Nets entered the draft holding their one first-round selection and two second-round selections. Unlike the two other selections, the 43rd pick is an additional second-round selection that originally belonged to the Los Angeles Clippers and acquired by Brooklyn from the Houston Rockets as the least favorable pick from a four-team pool in a 2025 seven-team trade that sent Kevin Durant to Houston.

== Roster ==
Brooklyn Nets roster
Players

| Pos. | No. | Player | Height | Weight | DOB | From |
|---|---|---|---|---|---|---|
| F | 34 | Tyler Bilodeau (TW) | 6 ft 8 in (2.03 m) | 230 lb (104 kg) | 2004-04-17 | UCLA |
| G | 0 | Mikel Brown Jr. | 6 ft 4 in (1.93 m) | 190 lb (86 kg) | 2006-04-03 | Louisville |
| F/C | 21 | Noah Clowney | 6 ft 10 in (2.08 m) | 240 lb (109 kg) | 2004-07-14 | Alabama |
| G | 8 | Egor Dëmin | 6 ft 9 in (2.06 m) | 212 lb (96 kg) | 2006-03-03 | BYU |
| G | 1 | Keon Ellis | 6 ft 4 in (1.93 m) | 180 lb (82 kg) | 2000-01-08 | Alabama |
| F | 9 | Joshua Jefferson | 6 ft 8 in (2.03 m) | 250 lb (113 kg) | 2003-11-21 | Iowa State |
| G/F | 31 | Chaney Johnson (TW) | 6 ft 7 in (2.01 m) | 235 lb (107 kg) | 2002-06-20 | Auburn |
| G/F | 14 | Terance Mann | 6 ft 5 in (1.96 m) | 220 lb (100 kg) | 1996-10-18 | Florida State |
| F | 00 | Josh Minott | 6 ft 9 in (2.06 m) | 215 lb (98 kg) | 2002-11-25 | Memphis |
| F | 16 | Grant Nelson (TW) | 6 ft 10 in (2.08 m) | 240 lb (109 kg) | 2002-03-18 | Alabama |
| F | 17 | Michael Porter Jr. | 6 ft 10 in (2.08 m) | 232 lb (105 kg) | 1998-06-29 | Missouri |
| G/F | 4 | Drake Powell | 6 ft 6 in (1.98 m) | 212 lb (96 kg) | 2005-09-08 | North Carolina |
| F/C | 30 | Julius Randle | 6 ft 9 in (2.06 m) | 256 lb (116 kg) | 1994-11-29 | Kentucky |
| G | 77 | Ben Saraf | 6 ft 5 in (1.96 m) | 212 lb (96 kg) | 2006-04-14 | Ramot Yam High School (Hefer, Israel) |
| C | 20 | Day'Ron Sharpe | 6 ft 10 in (2.08 m) | 265 lb (120 kg) | 2001-11-06 | North Carolina |
| G | 10 | Nolan Traoré | 6 ft 4 in (1.93 m) | 190 lb (86 kg) | 2006-05-28 | INSEP (Paris, France) |
| F/C | 13 | Moritz Wagner | 6 ft 11 in (2.11 m) | 255 lb (116 kg) | 1997-04-26 | Michigan |
| F | 2 | Danny Wolf (GL) | 6 ft 11 in (2.11 m) | 256 lb (116 kg) | 2004-05-05 | Michigan |

Coaches
Head coach
- Jordi Fernández
Assistant(s)
- Travis Bader
- Deividas Dulkys
- Ryan Forehan-Kelly
- Dutch Gaitley
- Connor Griffin
- Jay Hernandez
- Steve Hetzel
- Juwan Howard
- Corey Vinson

Legend
- (DP) Unsigned draft pick
- (FA) Free agent
- (S) Suspended
- (GL) On assignment to G League affiliate
- (TW) Two-way affiliate player
- Injured

Roster
Updated: September 4, 2026

== Standings ==
=== Division ===
| Atlantic Division | W | L | PCT | GB | Home | Road | Div | GP |
|---|---|---|---|---|---|---|---|---|
| Philadelphia 76ers | 13 | 3 | .813 | – | 6‍–‍2 | 7‍–‍1 | 4–1 | 16 |
| Boston Celtics | 11 | 4 | .733 | 1.5 | 6‍–‍1 | 5‍–‍3 | 4–0 | 15 |
| New York Knicks | 9 | 6 | .600 | 3.5 | 4‍–‍3 | 5‍–‍3 | 3–3 | 15 |
| Toronto Raptors | 5 | 10 | .333 | 7.5 | 2‍–‍6 | 3‍–‍4 | 0–4 | 15 |
| Brooklyn Nets | 3 | 11 | .214 | 9.0 | 1‍–‍5 | 2‍–‍6 | 0–3 | 14 |

=== Conference ===
Eastern Conference
| # | Team | W | L | PCT | GB | GP |
|---|---|---|---|---|---|---|
| 1 | Philadelphia 76ers * | 13 | 3 | .813 | – | 16 |
| 2 | Boston Celtics | 11 | 4 | .733 | 1.5 | 15 |
| 3 | Detroit Pistons * | 10 | 4 | .714 | 2.0 | 14 |
| 4 | Miami Heat * | 9 | 6 | .600 | 3.5 | 15 |
| 5 | Atlanta Hawks | 9 | 6 | .600 | 3.5 | 15 |
| 6 | New York Knicks | 9 | 6 | .600 | 3.5 | 15 |
| 7 | Cleveland Cavaliers | 8 | 8 | .500 | 5.0 | 16 |
| 8 | Orlando Magic | 6 | 8 | .429 | 6.0 | 14 |
| 9 | Toronto Raptors | 5 | 10 | .333 | 7.5 | 15 |
| 10 | Indiana Pacers | 5 | 10 | .333 | 7.5 | 15 |
| 11 | Washington Wizards | 5 | 11 | .313 | 8.0 | 16 |
| 12 | Charlotte Hornets | 4 | 10 | .286 | 8.0 | 14 |
| 13 | Chicago Bulls | 4 | 10 | .286 | 8.0 | 14 |
| 14 | Brooklyn Nets | 3 | 11 | .214 | 9.0 | 14 |
| 15 | Milwaukee Bucks | 1 | 15 | .063 | 12.0 | 16 |

== Game log ==
=== Preseason ===
2026 preseason game log
Total: 3–1 (Home: 1–0; Road: 2–1)
Preseason: 3–1 (home: 1–0; road: 2–1)

| Game | Date | Team | Score | High points | High rebounds | High assists | Location Attendance | Record |
|---|---|---|---|---|---|---|---|---|
| 1 | October 6 | @ Charlotte | W 124–90 | Michael Porter Jr. (16) | Day'Ron Sharpe (7) | Tied (5) | Spectrum Center; 10,922 | 1–0 |
| 2 | October 8 | Philadelphia | W 114–108 | Julius Randle (14) | Randle, Wolf (6) | Egor Dëmin (5) | Barclays Center; 16,785 | 2–0 |
| 3 | October 12 | @ Washington | W 131–122 | Michael Porter Jr. (22) | Moritz Wagner (5) | Julius Randle (9) | Capital One Arena; 8,033 | 3–0 |
| 4 | October 14 | @ Miami | L 128–144 | Michael Porter Jr. (27) | Noah Clowney (7) | Randle, Traoré (5) | Kaseya Center; 19,600 | 3–1 |

2026–27 preseason schedule

=== Regular season ===
2026–27 game log
Total: 3–12 (Home: 1–6; Road: 2–6)
October: 0–5 (home: 0–3; road: 0–2)

| Game | Date | Team | Score | High points | High rebounds | High assists | Location Attendance | Record |
|---|---|---|---|---|---|---|---|---|
| 1 | October 21 | Charlotte | L 103–110 | Julius Randle (33) | Randle, Sharpe (8) | Julius Randle (7) | Barclays Center; 17,548 | 0–1 |
| 2 | October 24 | @ Cleveland | L 121–125 | Michael Porter Jr. (28) | Michael Porter Jr. (9) | Egor Dëmin (6) | Rocket Arena; 19,432 | 0–2 |
| 3 | October 25 | Indiana | L 109–136 | Nolan Traoré (17) | Josh Minott (8) | Julius Randle (7) | Barclays Center; 17,548 | 0–3 |
| 4 | October 27 | @ Boston | L 124–125 (OT) | Michael Porter Jr. (27) | Michael Porter Jr. (12) | Mikel Brown Jr. (5) | TD Garden; 19,156 | 0–4 |
| 5 | October 30 | Detroit | L 94–110 | Moritz Wagner (16) | Tied (8) | Mikel Brown Jr. (4) | Barclays Center; 17,548 | 0–5 |

November: 3–7 (home: 1–3; road: 2–4)

| Game | Date | Team | Score | High points | High rebounds | High assists | Location Attendance | Record |
|---|---|---|---|---|---|---|---|---|
| 6 | November 1 | @ Indiana | W 98–90 | Michael Porter Jr. (23) | Day'Ron Sharpe (13) | Randle, Traoré (6) | Gainbridge Fieldhouse; 17,274 | 1–5 |
| 7 | November 2 | @ New York | L 90–103 | Julius Randle (21) | Julius Randle (10) | Nolan Traoré (4) | Madison Square Garden; 19,812 | 1–6 |
| 8 | November 4 | Charlotte | W 114–104 | Michael Porter Jr. (26) | Michael Porter Jr. (10) | Day'Ron Sharpe (8) | Barclays Center; 16,943 | 2–6 |
| 9 | November 7 | @ Atlanta | L 121–124 | Michael Porter Jr. (25) | Tied (10) | Day'Ron Sharpe (13) | State Farm Arena; 16,117 | 2–7 |
| 10 | November 8 | @ Dallas | L 93–130 | Michael Porter Jr. (19) | Michael Porter Jr. (9) | Day'Ron Sharpe (6) | American Airlines Center; 19,184 | 2–8 |
| 11 | November 11 | @ New Orleans | W 145–111 | Dëmin, Porter Jr. (22) | Danny Wolf (11) | Randle, Sharpe (5) | Smoothie King Center; 15,043 | 3–8 |
| 12 | November 14 | @ Memphis | L 110–129 | Julius Randle (22) | Day'Ron Sharpe (11) | Randle, Sharpe (5) | FedExForum; 15,103 | 3–9 |
| 13 | November 16 | Philadelphia | L 123–135 | Julius Randle (33) | Day'Ron Sharpe (9) | Brown Jr., Sharpe (5) | Barclays Center; 17,548 | 3–10 |
| 14 | November 18 | Chicago | L 107–137 | Egor Dëmin (22) | Danny Wolf (6) | Tied (4) | Barclays Center; 17,548 | 3–11 |
| 15 | November 20 | Orlando | L 111–113 | Day'Ron Sharpe (27) | Day'Ron Sharpe (11) | Julius Randle (6) | Barclays Center; 17,067 | 3–12 |
| 16 | November 23 | @ Minnesota | | | | | Target Center | – |
| 17 | November 25 | @ Milwaukee | | | | | Fiserv Forum | – |
| 18 | November 27 | @ Toronto | | | | | Scotiabank Arena | – |
| 19 | November 28 | @ Charlotte | | | | | Spectrum Center | – |
| 20 | November 30 | Oklahoma City | | | | | Barclays Center | – |

December: 0–0 (home: 0–0; road: 0–0)

| Game | Date | Team | Score | High points | High rebounds | High assists | Location Attendance | Record |
|---|---|---|---|---|---|---|---|---|
| 21 | December 2 | @ Oklahoma City | | | | | Paycom Center | – |
| 22 | TBD | TBD | | | | | TBD | – |
| 23 | TBD | TBD | | | | | TBD | – |
| 24 | December 13 | Boston | | | | | Barclays Center | – |
| 25 | December 14 | @ Detroit | | | | | Little Caesars Arena | – |
| 26 | December 16 | Dallas | | | | | Barclays Center | – |
| 27 | December 18 | Orlando | | | | | Barclays Center | – |
| 28 | December 20 | Washington | | | | | Barclays Center | – |
| 29 | December 21 | Portland | | | | | Barclays Center | – |
| 30 | December 23 | San Antonio | | | | | Barclays Center | – |
| 31 | December 26 | New Orleans | | | | | Barclays Center | – |
| 32 | December 27 | @ New York | | | | | Madison Square Garden | – |
| 33 | December 29 | @ Portland | | | | | Moda Center | – |
| 34 | December 31 | @ Sacramento | | | | | Golden 1 Center | – |

January: 0–0 (home: 0–0; road: 0–0)

| Game | Date | Team | Score | High points | High rebounds | High assists | Location Attendance | Record |
|---|---|---|---|---|---|---|---|---|
| 35 | January 2 | @ Golden State | | | | | Chase Center | – |
| 36 | January 4 | @ Utah | | | | | Delta Center | – |
| 37 | January 6 | Utah | | | | | Barclays Center | – |
| 38 | January 7 | Miami | | | | | Barclays Center | – |
| 39 | January 9 | Houston | | | | | Barclays Center | – |
| 40 | January 11 | @ Indiana | | | | | Gainbridge Fieldhouse | – |
| 41 | January 12 | @ Miami | | | | | Kaseya Center | – |
| 42 | January 14 | @ Philadelphia | | | | | Xfinity Mobile Arena | – |
| 43 | January 16 | @ Boston | | | | | TD Garden | – |
| 44 | January 20 | Chicago | | | | | Barclays Center | – |
| 45 | January 21 | Cleveland | | | | | Barclays Center | – |
| 46 | January 23 | Toronto | | | | | Barclays Center | – |
| 47 | January 25 | Miami | | | | | Barclays Center | – |
| 48 | January 27 | Phoenix | | | | | Barclays Center | – |
| 49 | January 29 | L.A. Clippers | | | | | Barclays Center | – |
| 50 | January 31 | @ Orlando | | | | | Kia Center | – |

February: 0–0 (home: 0–0; road: 0–0)

| Game | Date | Team | Score | High points | High rebounds | High assists | Location Attendance | Record |
|---|---|---|---|---|---|---|---|---|
| 51 | February 1 | New York | | | | | Barclays Center | – |
| 52 | February 4 | L.A. Lakers | | | | | Barclays Center | – |
| 53 | February 6 | Washington | | | | | Barclays Center | – |
| 54 | February 8 | @ Philadelphia | | | | | Xfinity Mobile Arena | – |
| 55 | February 9 | Minnesota | | | | | Barclays Center | – |
| 56 | February 12 | @ Washington | | | | | Capital One Arena | – |
| 57 | February 14 | @ Miami | | | | | Kaseya Center | – |
| 58 | February 17 | Atlanta | | | | | Barclays Center | – |
All-Star Game
| 59 | February 25 | Philadelphia | | | | | Barclays Center | – |
| 60 | February 27 | @ Chicago | | | | | United Center | – |

March: 0–0 (home: 0–0; road: 0–0)

| Game | Date | Team | Score | High points | High rebounds | High assists | Location Attendance | Record |
|---|---|---|---|---|---|---|---|---|
| 61 | March 1 | @ Denver | | | | | Ball Arena | – |
| 62 | March 3 | @ Phoenix | | | | | Mortgage Matchup Center | – |
| 63 | March 4 | @ L.A. Clippers | | | | | Intuit Dome | – |
| 64 | March 7 | @ L.A. Lakers | | | | | Crypto.com Arena | – |
| 65 | March 9 | Milwaukee | | | | | Barclays Center | – |
| 66 | March 11 | @ Atlanta | | | | | State Farm Arena | – |
| 67 | March 13 | @ Detroit | | | | | Little Caesars Arena | – |
| 68 | March 15 | Indiana | | | | | Barclays Center | – |
| 69 | March 17 | @ Houston | | | | | Toyota Center | – |
| 70 | March 18 | @ San Antonio | | | | | Frost Bank Center | – |
| 71 | March 21 | Sacramento | | | | | Barclays Center | – |
| 72 | March 23 | Boston | | | | | Barclays Center | – |
| 73 | March 25 | Denver | | | | | Barclays Center | – |
| 74 | March 28 | Memphis | | | | | Barclays Center | – |
| 75 | March 29 | Golden State | | | | | Barclays Center | – |
| 76 | March 31 | Cleveland | | | | | Barclays Center | – |

April: 0–0 (home: 0–0; road: 0–0)

| Game | Date | Team | Score | High points | High rebounds | High assists | Location Attendance | Record |
|---|---|---|---|---|---|---|---|---|
| 77 | April 2 | New York | | | | | Barclays Center | – |
| 78 | April 4 | @ Milwaukee | | | | | Fiserv Forum | – |
| 79 | April 5 | @ Cleveland | | | | | Rocket Arena | – |
| 80 | April 7 | @ Toronto | | | | | Scotiabank Arena | – |
| 81 | April 9 | @ Charlotte | | | | | Spectrum Center | – |
| 82 | April 11 | Toronto | | | | | Barclays Center | – |

2026–27 season schedule

== NBA Cup ==
=== East Group A ===
| Pos | Team | Pld | W | L | PF | PA | PD | Qualification |
|---|---|---|---|---|---|---|---|---|
| 1 | Orlando Magic | 3 | 3 | 0 | 341 | 324 | +17 | Advance to knockout stage |
| 2 | Toronto Raptors | 3 | 2 | 1 | 340 | 330 | +10 | Possible knockout stage based on ranking |
| 3 | Detroit Pistons | 2 | 1 | 1 | 212 | 199 | +13 | |
| 4 | Brooklyn Nets | 2 | 0 | 2 | 205 | 223 | −18 | |
| 5 | Milwaukee Bucks | 2 | 0 | 2 | 206 | 228 | −22 | |

Updated to game(s) played on November 20, 2026. Source:

== Transactions ==
=== Trades ===
| Date | Trade | | Ref. |
|---|---|---|---|
| July 10, 2026 | Four-team trade | | |
| July 10, 2026 | To Brooklyn Nets: Julius Randle (from Minnesota); Draft rights to Joshua Jefferson (No. 28) (from Minnesota) | To Charlotte Hornets: Mouhamadou Gueye (from Chicago); Naz Reid (from Minnesota); Draft rights to Matteo Spagnolo (2022 No. 50) (from Minnesota); 2028 first-round pick swap right (Note: Charlotte may swap its own pick for Minnesota's own pick.) (from Minnesota); 2029 first-round pick swap right (Note: Charlotte may swap its own pick for Minnesota's pick if it falls No. 1–5.) (from Minnesota); 2029 MIN second-round pick (from Minnesota); 2030 first-round pick swap right (Note: Through earlier trades, Minnesota will retain its own pick or receive the pick originally belonging to Dallas and San Antonio, if Minnesota's pick falls No. 2–30; Charlotte may swap its own pick for whichever pick Minnesota has afterward.) (from Minnesota); 2032 MIN second-round pick (from Minnesota); 2033 MIN first-round pick (from Minnesota); 2033 MIN second-round pick (from Minnesota) | |
| July 10, 2026 | To Chicago Bulls: Nic Claxton (from Brooklyn) | To Minnesota Timberwolves: LaMelo Ball (from Charlotte); Josh Green (from Charlotte); Draft rights to Isaiah Evans (No. 33) (from Brooklyn) | |

=== Free agency ===
==== Re-signed ====
| Date | Player | Ref. |
|---|---|---|
| June 30, 2026 | (United States) Day'Ron Sharpe | |
| June 30, 2026 | (United States) Josh Minott | |

==== Additions ====
| Date | Player | Former Team | Ref. |
|---|---|---|---|
| June 30, 2026 | (United States) Keon Ellis | Cleveland Cavaliers | |
| July 1, 2026 | (Germany) Moritz Wagner | Orlando Magic | |

==== Subtractions ====
| Player | Reason | New Team | Ref. |
|---|---|---|---|
| Ziaire Williams | Free agency | Los Angeles Lakers | |
| Jalen Wilson | Free agency | Atlanta Hawks | |
