= 2026–27 Minnesota Timberwolves season =

- Head coach: Chris Finch
- President: Tim Connelly
- General manager: Tim Connelly
- Owner(s): Alex Rodriguez & Marc Lore
- Arena: Target Center

Results
- Record: 12–5 (.706)
- Place: Division: 1st (Northwest); Conference: 3rd (Western)
- Stats at Basketball Reference

Local media
- Television: DAZN
- Radio: WCCO

The 2026–27 Minnesota Timberwolves season is the 38th season for the franchise in the National Basketball Association (NBA). On June 7, 2026, the team unveiled their rebranded logo and uniforms reminiscent of their first two identities, retiring the look that has been in place since 2017–18. On July 10, the team acquired LaMelo Ball and Josh Green from the Charlotte Hornets and traded away Naz Reid to Charlotte and Julius Randle to the Brooklyn Nets as part of a four-team deal.

The Timberwolves will retire Kevin Garnett's jersey number 21 when they play the Boston Celtics (the second team Garnett played for who previously retired his jersey number 5) on February 28, 2027.

== Draft picks ==
Round	Pick	Player	Position	Nationality	College
1	28	Joshua Jefferson	PF	United States	Iowa State
2	59	Trey Kaufman-Renn	PF	United States	Purdue

The Timberwolves entered the draft holding one first-round selection and one second-round selection, both acquired through previous trades. The first-round selection is a 2026 first-round swap (from a February 2026 trade) with the Detroit Pistons that was exercised because both teams' picks fell outside the Top-19 protected range, while the second-round pick is the least favorable of the San Antonio Spurs (the pick's original owner), Indiana Pacers, and Miami Heat selections, conveyed to the team via Indiana because San Antonio finished with the best record of the three in the 2025–26 season. The Timberwolves had traded their second-round selection to the New York Knicks through a 2020 trade and the pick eventually landed with the Washington Wizards as the least favorable of a four-team pool.

== Roster ==
Minnesota Timberwolves roster
Players

Pos.	No.	Player	Height	Weight	DOB	From
G	1	LaMelo Ball	6 ft 7 in (2.01 m)	180 lb (82 kg)	2001-08-22	SPIRE Academy (OH)
F	19	Joan Beringer	7 ft 0 in (2.13 m)	230 lb (104 kg)	2006-11-11	France
C	12	Johni Broome (TW)	6 ft 9 in (2.06 m)	244 lb (111 kg)	2002-07-19	Auburn
G	7	Jaylen Clark (injured)	6 ft 5 in (1.96 m)	205 lb (93 kg)	2001-10-13	UCLA
G	0	Donte DiVincenzo (injured)	6 ft 4 in (1.93 m)	203 lb (92 kg)	1997-01-31	Villanova
G	13	Ayo Dosunmu	6 ft 4 in (1.93 m)	201 lb (91 kg)	2000-01-17	Illinois
G	5	Anthony Edwards (injured)	6 ft 4 in (1.93 m)	225 lb (102 kg)	2001-08-05	Georgia
F	33	Isaiah Evans	6 ft 6 in (1.98 m)	175 lb (79 kg)	2005-12-06	Duke
C	27	Rudy Gobert	7 ft 1 in (2.16 m)	258 lb (117 kg)	1992-06-26	France
G	8	Bones Hyland	6 ft 2 in (1.88 m)	169 lb (77 kg)	2000-09-14	VCU
F	24	Jonathan Kuminga	6 ft 7 in (2.01 m)	225 lb (102 kg)	2002-10-06	The Patrick School (NJ)
F	41	Trey Lyles	6 ft 9 in (2.06 m)	234 lb (106 kg)	1995-11-05	Kentucky
F	3	Jaden McDaniels	6 ft 9 in (2.06 m)	185 lb (84 kg)	2000-09-29	Washington
G	15	Zyon Pullin (TW)	6 ft 4 in (1.93 m)	206 lb (93 kg)	2001-03-03	Florida
G/F	4	Terrence Shannon Jr.	6 ft 6 in (1.98 m)	215 lb (98 kg)	2000-07-30	Illinois
F	9	Cody Williams	6 ft 7 in (2.01 m)	190 lb (86 kg)	2004-11-20	Colorado
C	44	Rocco Zikarsky (TW)	7 ft 3 in (2.21 m)	227 lb (103 kg)	2006-07-11	Australia

Coaches
Head coach
- Chris Finch
Assistant(s)
- Nathan Bubes
- Joey Dorsey
- Moses Ehambe
- Kevin Hanson
- Chris Hines
- Max Lefevre
- Jeff Newton
- Pablo Prigioni
- Elston Turner

Legend
- (DP) Unsigned draft pick
- (FA) Free agent
- (S) Suspended
- (GL) On assignment to G League affiliate
- (TW) Two-way affiliate player
- Injured

Roster
Updated: November 5, 2026

== Standings ==
=== Division ===
Northwest Division	W	L	PCT	GB	Home	Road	Div	GP
Minnesota Timberwolves	11	5	.688	–	7‍–‍3	4‍–‍2	3–0	16
Portland Trail Blazers	10	5	.667	0.5	3‍–‍2	7‍–‍3	4–2	15
Denver Nuggets	9	5	.643	1.0	4‍–‍3	5‍–‍2	0–2	14
Oklahoma City Thunder	10	6	.625	1.0	6‍–‍1	4‍–‍5	1–2	16
Utah Jazz	3	14	.176	8.5	1‍–‍8	2‍–‍6	0–2	17

=== Conference ===
Western Conference
#	Team	W	L	PCT	GB	GP
1	Los Angeles Lakers *	14	3	.824	–	17
2	San Antonio Spurs *	13	3	.813	0.5	16
3	Memphis Grizzlies	12	4	.750	1.5	16
4	Houston Rockets	12	5	.706	2.0	17
5	Minnesota Timberwolves *	11	5	.688	2.5	16
6	Portland Trail Blazers	10	5	.667	3.0	15
7	Denver Nuggets	9	5	.643	3.5	14
8	Oklahoma City Thunder	10	6	.625	3.5	16
9	Phoenix Suns	8	7	.533	5.0	15
10	Dallas Mavericks	8	7	.533	5.0	15
11	Golden State Warriors	8	8	.500	5.5	16
12	New Orleans Pelicans	5	12	.294	9.0	17
13	Los Angeles Clippers	4	10	.286	8.5	14
14	Utah Jazz	3	14	.176	11.0	17
15	Sacramento Kings	1	14	.067	12.0	15

== Game log ==
=== Preseason ===
2026 preseason game log
Total: 3–3 (Home: 0–1; Road: 3–2)
Preseason: 3–3 (home: 0–1; road: 3–2)

Game	Date	Team	Score	High points	High rebounds	High assists	Location Attendance	Record
1	October 5	@ Milwaukee	W 116–97	Anthony Edwards (14)	Beringer, Gobert (7)	Shannon Jr., Williams (4)	Fiserv Forum; 9,147	1–0
2	October 7	@ Indiana	L 112–123	Anthony Edwards (19)	Rudy Gobert (9)	LaMelo Ball (7)	Hilton Coliseum; 13,952	1–1
3	October 10	@ Miami	W 125–124	Bones Hyland (23)	Trey Lyles (8)	Jaylen Clark (5)	Kaseya Center; 19,600	2–1
4	October 12	@ New York	W 122–104	Anthony Edwards (26)	Jaden McDaniels (5)	LaMelo Ball (7)	Madison Square Garden; 19,812	3–1
5	October 14	Detroit	L 106–128	Anthony Edwards (20)	Joan Beringer (7)	LaMelo Ball (6)	Target Center; 10,262	3–2
6	October 16	@ Chicago	L 116–133	Isaiah Evans (21)	Clark, Timme (7)	Zyon Pullin (10)	United Center; 21,017	3–3

2026–27 preseason schedule

=== Regular season ===
2026–27 game log
Total: 12–5 (Home: 7–3; Road: 4–2)
October: 4–3 (home: 2–1; road: 2–2)

Game	Date	Team	Score	High points	High rebounds	High assists	Location Attendance	Record
1	October 21	@ Miami	W 131–106	Anthony Edwards (45)	Rudy Gobert (15)	LaMelo Ball (6)	Kaseya Center; 19,837	1–0
2	October 23	@ Orlando	W 115–93	Edwards, McDaniels (15)	Tied (9)	Ayo Dosunmu (9)	Kia Center; 19,551	2–0
3	October 25	Toronto	W 117–94	Anthony Edwards (26)	Rudy Gobert (13)	LaMelo Ball (8)	Target Center; 18,978	3–0
4	October 26	@ Cleveland	L 125–127 (OT)	Anthony Edwards (47)	Rudy Gobert (19)	LaMelo Ball (6)	Rocket Arena; 19,432	3–1
5	October 28	Golden State	L 114–119	Jonathan Kuminga (20)	Joan Beringer (9)	LaMelo Ball (8)	Target Center; 16,588	3–2
6	October 30	L.A. Clippers	W 127–101	LaMelo Ball (24)	Rudy Gobert (13)	Bones Hyland (8)	Target Center; 17,593	4–2
7	October 31	@ San Antonio	L 111–121	Ayo Dosunmu (27)	Ayo Dosunmu (9)	Ball, Shannon Jr. (4)	Frost Bank Center; 18,354	4–3

November: 8–2 (home: 6–2; road: 2–0)

Game	Date	Team	Score	High points	High rebounds	High assists	Location Attendance	Record
8	November 2	Milwaukee	W 112–100	LaMelo Ball (32)	Ayo Dosunmu (12)	Ayo Dosunmu (8)	Target Center; 16,893	5–3
9	November 4	@ Houston	W 117–107	Ayo Dosunmu (21)	Rudy Gobert (11)	Ball, Dosunmu (6)	Toyota Center; 18,055	6–3
10	November 6	@ New Orleans	W 115–109	Ayo Dosunmu (26)	Trey Lyles (13)	LaMelo Ball (8)	Smoothie King Center; 17,767	7–3
11	November 8	Utah	W 115–100	Ayo Dosunmu (26)	Rudy Gobert (15)	LaMelo Ball (5)	Target Center; 18,029	8–3
12	November 12	Dallas	W 133–94	Bones Hyland (24)	Beringer, McDaniels (9)	LaMelo Ball (8)	Target Center; 17,856	9–3
13	November 14	Chicago	L 106–117	Ayo Dosunmu (24)	Rudy Gobert (10)	Ball, McDaniels (6)	Target Center; 18,054	9–4
14	November 16	Portland	W 106–98	Terrence Shannon Jr. (34)	Rudy Gobert (15)	Terrence Shannon Jr. (6)	Target Center; 18,236	10–4
15	November 17	Portland	W 106–105	Ayo Dosunmu (30)	Joan Beringer (13)	Ayo Dosumnu (5)	Target Center; 18,281	11–4
16	November 19	New York	L 99–102	Jonathan Kuminga (23)	LaMelo Ball (8)	LaMelo Ball (8)	Target Center	11–5
17	November 21	Memphis	W 104–95	Jaden McDaniels (25)	Rudy Gobert (11)	LaMelo Ball (7)	Target Center	12–5
18	November 23	Brooklyn					Target Center	–
19	November 25	@ Oklahoma City					Paycom Center	–
20	November 27	Memphis					Target Center	–
21	November 29	@ Sacramento					Golden 1 Center	–

December: 0–0 (home: 0–0; road: 0–0)

Game	Date	Team	Score	High points	High rebounds	High assists	Location Attendance	Record
22	December 1	@ Portland					Moda Center	–
23	December 2	@ L.A. Clippers					Intuit Dome	–
24	December	TBD					TBD	–
25	December	TBD					TBD	–
26	December 12	@ Phoenix					Mortgage Matchup Center	–
27	December 14	@ Utah					Delta Center	–
28	December 16	L.A. Lakers					Target Center	–
29	December 18	L.A. Lakers					Target Center	–
30	December 21	Phoenix					Target Center	–
31	December 23	@ Milwaukee					Fiserv Forum	–
32	December 25	Oklahoma City					Target Center	–
33	December 27	@ Golden State					Chase Center	–
34	December 28	@ Denver					Ball Arena	–
35	December 31	Denver					Target Center	–

January: 0–0 (home: 0–0; road: 0–0)

Game	Date	Team	Score	High points	High rebounds	High assists	Location Attendance	Record
36	January 2	@ Indiana					Gainbridge Fieldhouse	–
37	January 3	San Antonio					Target Center	–
38	January 5	@ Houston					Toyota Center	–
39	January 7	@ Toronto					Scotiabank Arena	–
40	January 8	@ Washington					Capital One Arena	–
41	January 11	Cleveland					Target Center	–
42	January 14	@ Chicago					United Center	–
43	January 16	@ Philadelphia					Xfinity Mobile Arena	–
44	January 18	@ New York					Madison Square Garden	–
45	January 20	Houston					Target Center	–
46	January 22	@ San Antonio					Frost Bank Center	–
47	January 24	@ Detroit					Little Caesars Arena	–
48	January 25	@ Memphis					FedEx Forum	–
49	January 27	Denver					Target Center	–
50	January 29	Charlotte					Target Center	–
51	January 31	Phoenix					Target Center	–

February: 0–0 (home: 0–0; road: 0–0)

Game	Date	Team	Score	High points	High rebounds	High assists	Location Attendance	Record
52	February 2	@ Portland					Moda Center	–
53	February 4	@ Sacramento					Golden 1 Center	–
54	February 6	Miami					Target Center	–
55	February 7	Utah					Target Center	–
56	February 9	@ Brooklyn					Barclays Center	–
57	February 12	@ Boston					TD Garden	–
58	February 15	@ Charlotte					Spectrum Center	–
59	February 18	San Antonio					Target Center	–
All-Star Game
60	February 26	Indiana					Target Center	–
61	February 28	Boston					Target Center	–

March: 0–0 (home: 0–0; road: 0–0)

Game	Date	Team	Score	High points	High rebounds	High assists	Location Attendance	Record
62	March 2	@ Oklahoma City					Paycom Center	–
63	March 5	@ Phoenix					Mortgage Matchup Center	–
64	March 7	@ Denver					Ball Arena	–
65	March 8	New Orleans					Target Center	–
66	March 10	Atlanta					Target Center	–
67	March 13	Philadelphia					Target Center	–
68	March 14	Washington					Target Center	–
69	March 16	@ New Orleans					Smoothie King Center	–
70	March 18	@ Utah					Delta Center	–
71	March 22	Detroit					Target Center	–
72	March 24	Dallas					Target Center	–
73	March 26	Orlando					Target Center	–
74	March 28	Oklahoma City					Target Center	–
75	March 29	@ Atlanta					State Farm Arena	–
76	March 31	Sacramento					Target Center	–

April: 0–0 (home: 0–0; road: 0–0)

Game	Date	Team	Score	High points	High rebounds	High assists	Location Attendance	Record
77	April 2	Golden State					Target Center	–
78	April 4	@ Dallas					American Airlines Center	–
79	April 6	@ L.A. Clippers					Intuit Dome	–
80	April 7	@ L.A. Lakers					Crypto.com Arena	–
81	April 9	@ L.A. Lakers					Crypto.com Arena	–
82	April 11	Houston					Target Center	–

2026–27 season schedule

== NBA Cup ==
=== West Group B ===
Pos	Team	Pld	W	L	PF	PA	PD	Qualification
1	Minnesota Timberwolves	2	2	0	242	210	+32	Advance to knockout stage
2	Oklahoma City Thunder	3	2	1	366	330	+36	Possible knockout stage based on ranking
3	Memphis Grizzlies	2	1	1	239	239	0	
4	Los Angeles Clippers	2	1	1	214	239	−25	
5	New Orleans Pelicans	3	0	3	340	383	−43	

Updated to game(s) played on November 20, 2026. Source:

== Transactions ==
=== Trades ===
Date	Trade		Ref.
July 10, 2026	Four-team trade		
July 10, 2026	To Brooklyn Nets: Julius Randle (from Minnesota); Draft rights to Joshua Jefferson (No. 28) (from Minnesota)	To Charlotte Hornets: Mouhamadou Gueye (from Chicago); Naz Reid (from Minnesota); Draft rights to Matteo Spagnolo (2022 No. 50) (from Minnesota); 2028 first-round pick swap right (Note: Charlotte may swap its own pick for Minnesota's own pick.) (from Minnesota); 2029 first-round pick swap right (Note: Charlotte may swap its own pick for Minnesota's pick if it falls No. 1–5.) (from Minnesota); 2029 MIN second-round pick (from Minnesota); 2030 first-round pick swap right (Note: Through earlier trades, Minnesota will retain its own pick or receive the pick originally belonging to Dallas Mavericks and San Antonio Spurs, if Minnesota's pick falls No. 2–30; Charlotte Hornets may swap its own pick for whichever pick Minnesota has afterward.) (from Minnesota); 2032 MIN second-round pick (from Minnesota); 2033 MIN first-round pick (from Minnesota); 2033 MIN second-round pick (from Minnesota)	
July 10, 2026	To Chicago Bulls: Nic Claxton (from Brooklyn)	To Minnesota Timberwolves: LaMelo Ball (from Charlotte); Josh Green (from Charlotte); Draft rights to Isaiah Evans (No. 33) (from Brooklyn)	
August 29, 2026	To Minnesota Timberwolves: John Konchar; Cody Williams	To Utah Jazz: Josh Green; Cash considerations	

=== Free agency ===
==== Re-signed ====
Date	Player	Ref.
July 3, 2026	Bones Hyland	
July 10, 2026	Jaylen Clark	
July 10, 2026	Ayo Dosunmu	

==== Additions ====
Date	Player	Former Team	Ref.
July 11, 2026	Trey Lyles	Real Madrid Baloncesto (Spain)	

==== Subtractions ====
Player	Reason	New Team	Ref.
Joe Ingles	Signed overseas	Melbourne United (Australia)	
Kyle Anderson	Free agency	Toronto Raptors	
Mike Conley Jr.	Free agency	Boston Celtics	
Julian Phillips	Free agency	Houston Rockets	
