= 2026–27 Portland Trail Blazers season =

- Head coach: Micah Nori
- President: Dewayne Hankins
- General manager: Joe Cronin
- Owner: Thomas Dundon
- Arena: Moda Center

Results
- Record: 10–6 (.625)
- Place: Division: 3rd (Northwest); Conference: 7th (Western)
- Stats at Basketball Reference

Local media
- Television: Rip City Television Network (Note: Affiliates include: KUNP/KATU-DT2 (Portland); KVAL-DT2 (Eugene); KCBY-DT2 (Coos Bay); KPIC-DT2 (Roseburg); KTVL-DT3 (Medford); KUNS-TV/KSTW (Seattle); KIMA-DT3 (Yakima); KEPR-DT3 (Pasco); KXLY-TV/KXLY-DT2/KXLY-DT3 (Spokane); KOHD-DT2 (Bend)); BlazerVision
- Radio: KPOJ

The 2026–27 Portland Trail Blazers season is the 57th season of the franchise in the National Basketball Association (NBA). On June 23, 2026, the Trail Blazers hired Micah Nori as their new head coach. On June 29, the team acquired Ja Morant via trade with the Memphis Grizzlies. This season marks the return of star point guard Damian Lillard, who missed the previous season recovering from an Achilles tendon injury sustained with the Milwaukee Bucks during the 2025 playoffs before rejoining the Portland Trail Blazers for his second stint.

The Trail Blazers opened the season with a 6–1 record, their best start to a season since 1999–2000.

== Draft picks ==
The Trail Blazers entered the draft without holding any selections. Their first-round pick was conveyed to the Chicago Bulls as part of a 2021 three-team trade when Portland clinched a 2026 playoff berth, having remained lottery-protected from 2022 to 2025 due to Portland's playoff misses. Meanwhile, their second-round pick was traded to the New Orleans Pelicans in 2021 and was used in the draft by the San Antonio Spurs as the less favorable selection, owing to Portland finishing the 2025–26 season with a better record than New Orleans.

== Roster ==
Portland Trail Blazers roster
Players

Pos.	No.	Player	Height	Weight	DOB	From
F	8	Deni Avdija	6 ft 8 in (2.03 m)	227 lb (103 kg)	2001-01-03	Tichon Hadash
F	33	Toumani Camara	6 ft 7 in (2.01 m)	230 lb (104 kg)	2000-05-08	Dayton
C	10	Branden Carlson	7 ft 0 in (2.13 m)	220 lb (100 kg)	1999-06-14	Utah
F	91	Sidy Cissoko	6 ft 6 in (1.98 m)	220 lb (100 kg)	2004-04-02	France
C	23	Donovan Clingan	7 ft 2 in (2.18 m)	285 lb (129 kg)	2004-02-23	Connecticut
G	00	Scoot Henderson	6 ft 3 in (1.91 m)	205 lb (93 kg)	2004-02-03	Carlton J. Kell HS (GA)
G	5	Jrue Holiday	6 ft 4 in (1.93 m)	220 lb (100 kg)	1990-06-12	UCLA
F	29	Jayson Kent (TW)	6 ft 8 in (2.03 m)	210 lb (95 kg)	2002-02-03	Texas
F	27	Vít Krejčí (injured)	6 ft 8 in (2.03 m)	215 lb (98 kg)	2000-06-19	Czech Republic
G	0	Damian Lillard	6 ft 2 in (1.88 m)	200 lb (91 kg)	1990-07-15	Weber State
G	1	Ja Morant (injured)	6 ft 2 in (1.88 m)	174 lb (79 kg)	1999-08-10	Murray State
F/C	9	Micah Potter	6 ft 9 in (2.06 m)	250 lb (113 kg)	1998-04-06	Wisconsin
G	17	Shaedon Sharpe (injured)	6 ft 5 in (1.96 m)	210 lb (95 kg)	2003-05-30	Dream City Christian (AZ)
G	2	John Tonje (TW)	6 ft 4 in (1.93 m)	223 lb (101 kg)	2001-04-23	Wisconsin
C	35	Robert Williams III	6 ft 9 in (2.06 m)	250 lb (113 kg)	1997-10-17	Texas A&M
C	16	Hansen Yang	7 ft 1 in (2.16 m)	267 lb (121 kg)	2005-06-26	Zibo High School
G	11	Chris Youngblood (TW)	6 ft 4 in (1.93 m)	223 lb (101 kg)	2002-02-09	Alabama

Coaches
Head coach
- Micah Nori
Assistant(s)
- Jay Triano
- Quinton Crawford
- Mike Williams
- Gilbert Abraham
- Leron Black

Legend
- (DP) Unsigned draft pick
- (FA) Free agent
- (S) Suspended
- (GL) On assignment to G League
- (TW) Two-way affiliate player
- Injured

Roster
Updated: October 30, 2026

== Standings ==
=== Division ===
Northwest Division	W	L	PCT	GB	Home	Road	Div	GP
Minnesota Timberwolves	11	5	.688	–	7‍–‍3	4‍–‍2	3–0	16
Portland Trail Blazers	10	5	.667	0.5	3‍–‍2	7‍–‍3	4–2	15
Denver Nuggets	9	5	.643	1.0	4‍–‍3	5‍–‍2	0–2	14
Oklahoma City Thunder	10	6	.625	1.0	6‍–‍1	4‍–‍5	1–2	16
Utah Jazz	3	14	.176	8.5	1‍–‍8	2‍–‍6	0–2	17

=== Conference ===
Western Conference
#	Team	W	L	PCT	GB	GP
1	Los Angeles Lakers *	14	3	.824	–	17
2	San Antonio Spurs *	13	3	.813	0.5	16
3	Memphis Grizzlies	12	4	.750	1.5	16
4	Houston Rockets	12	5	.706	2.0	17
5	Minnesota Timberwolves *	11	5	.688	2.5	16
6	Portland Trail Blazers	10	5	.667	3.0	15
7	Denver Nuggets	9	5	.643	3.5	14
8	Oklahoma City Thunder	10	6	.625	3.5	16
9	Phoenix Suns	8	7	.533	5.0	15
10	Dallas Mavericks	8	7	.533	5.0	15
11	Golden State Warriors	8	8	.500	5.5	16
12	New Orleans Pelicans	5	12	.294	9.0	17
13	Los Angeles Clippers	4	10	.286	8.5	14
14	Utah Jazz	3	14	.176	11.0	17
15	Sacramento Kings	1	14	.067	12.0	15

== Game log ==
=== Preseason ===
2026 preseason game log
Total: 3–1 (Home: 2–0; Road: 1–1)
Preseason: 3–1 (home: 2–0; road: 1–1)

Game	Date	Team	Score	High points	High rebounds	High assists	Location Attendance	Record
1	October 7	Golden State	W 123–118	Deni Avdija (23)	Donovan Clingan (10)	Holiday, Morant (5)	Moda Center	1–0
2	October 12	London Lions	W 119–66	Camara, Henderson (14)	Jeremy Sochan (8)	Ja Morant (5)	Moda Center; 5,397	2–0
3	October 13	@ Sacramento	W 110–98	Deni Avdija (26)	Deni Avdija (9)	Ja Morant (6)	Golden 1 Center; 12,108	3–0
4	October 16	@ Golden State	L 118–128	Damian Lillard (23)	Donovan Clingan (11)	Tied (3)	Chase Center; 18,064	3–1

2026–27 preseason schedule

=== Regular season ===
2026–27 game log
Total: 10–6 (Home: 3–2; Road: 7–4)
October: 4–1 (home: 1–1; road: 3–0)

Game	Date	Team	Score	High points	High rebounds	High assists	Location Attendance	Record
1	October 21	Phoenix	W 124–83	Damian Lillard (25)	Avdija, Williams III (10)	Ja Morant (8)	Moda Center; 19,367	1–0
2	October 23	@ Sacramento	W 128–120	Deni Avdija (26)	Donovan Clingan (10)	Jrue Holiday (8)	Golden 1 Center; 17,832	2–0
3	October 27	@ L.A. Lakers	W 136–129	Avdija, Morant (23)	Clingan, Williams III (10)	Deni Avdija (9)	Crypto.com Arena; 19,067	3–0
4	October 29	Memphis	L 103–124	Deni Avdija (24)	Deni Avdija (9)	Deni Avdija (7)	Moda Center; 19,367	3–1
5	October 31	@ Utah	W 112–90	Deni Avdija (24)	Donovan Clingan (9)	Damian Lillard (4)	Delta Center; 17,867	4–1

November: 6–5 (home: 2–1; road: 4–4)

Game	Date	Team	Score	High points	High rebounds	High assists	Location Attendance	Record
6	November 2	@ Denver	W 118–110	Deni Avdija (28)	Donovan Clingan (18)	Jrue Holiday (10)	Ball Arena; 19,520	5–1
7	November 4	@ Phoenix	W 132–119	Damian Lillard (25)	Donovan Clingan (11)	Deni Avdija (12)	Mortgage Matchup Center; 17,071	6–1
8	November 6	@ L.A. Lakers	L 118–124	Avdija, Lillard (22)	Donovan Clingan (11)	Deni Avdija (11)	Crypto.com Arena; 19,057	6–2
9	November 7	San Antonio	L 103–125	Deni Avdija (15)	Yang Hansen (10)	Damian Lillard (7)	Moda Center; 19,916	6–3
10	November 10	Oklahoma City	W 123–103	Damian Lillard (25)	Donovan Clingan (13)	Deni Avdija (8)	Moda Center; 19,367	7–3
11	November 11	Oklahoma City	W 118–108	Deni Avdija (28)	Donovan Clingan (12)	Deni Avdija (6)	Moda Center; 19,851	8–3
12	November 13	@ Sacramento	W 120–107	Deni Avdija (34)	Donovan Clingan (11)	Damian Lillard (6)	Golden 1 Center; 14,631	9–3
13	November 16	@ Minnesota	L 98–106	Deni Avdija (27)	Donovan Clingan (10)	Avdija, Lillard (4)	Target Center; 18,236	9–4
14	November 17	@ Minnesota	L 105–106	Damian Lillard (25)	Donovan Clingan (12)	Jrue Holiday (6)	Target Center; 18,281	9–5
15	November 19	@ Milwaukee	W 124–114	Damian Lillard (33)	Donovan Clingan (13)	Jrue Holiday (7)	Fiserv Forum; 13,545	10–5
16	November 21	@ New York	L 96–97	Donovan Clingan (22)	Donovan Clingan (13)	Jrue Holiday (7)	Madison Square Garden; 19,812	10–6
17	November 23	@ Philadelphia					Xfinity Mobile Arena	–
18	November 25	San Antonio					Moda Center	–
19	November 27	Golden State					Moda Center	–
20	November 29	New Orleans					Moda Center	–

December: 0–0 (home: 0–0; road: 0–0)

Game	Date	Team	Score	High points	High rebounds	High assists	Location Attendance	Record
21	December 1	Minnesota					Moda Center	–
22	December 3	Utah					Moda Center	–
23	TBD	TBD					TBD	–
24	TBD	TBD					TBD	–
25	December 12	Atlanta					Moda Center	–
26	December 15	Denver					Moda Center	–
27	December 17	@ Indiana					Gainbridge Fieldhouse	–
28	December 19	@ Charlotte					Spectrum Center	–
29	December 21	@ Brooklyn					Barclays Center	–
30	December 23	@ Boston					TD Garden	–
31	December 26	@ Washington					Capital One Arena	–
32	December 27	@ Detroit					Little Caesars Arena	–
33	December 29	Brooklyn					Moda Center	–

January: 0–0 (home: 0–0; road: 0–0)

Game	Date	Team	Score	High points	High rebounds	High assists	Location Attendance	Record
34	January 2	Boston					Moda Center	–
35	January 4	New York					Moda Center	–
36	January 6	@ New Orleans					Smoothie King Center	–
37	January 7	@ Dallas					American Airlines Center	–
38	January 9	Charlotte					Moda Center	–
39	January 12	Orlando					Moda Center	–
40	January 13	L.A. Lakers					Moda Center	–
41	January 15	Sacramento					Moda Center	–
42	January 17	@ Oklahoma City					Paycom Center	–
43	January 19	@ Miami					Kaseya Center	–
44	January 20	@ Atlanta					State Farm Arena	–
45	January 22	@ Orlando					Kia Center	–
46	January 24	@ San Antonio					Frost Bank Center	–
47	January 26	Washington					Moda Center	–
48	January 27	Golden State					Moda Center	–
49	January 31	@ Denver					Ball Arena	–

February: 0–0 (home: 0–0; road: 0–0)

Game	Date	Team	Score	High points	High rebounds	High assists	Location Attendance	Record
50	February 2	Minnesota					Moda Center	–
51	February 4	Cleveland					Moda Center	–
52	February 6	@ Memphis					FedExForum	–
53	February 8	@ Memphis					FedExForum	–
54	February 9	@ Oklahoma City					Paycom Center	–
55	February 11	@ Dallas					American Airlines Center	–
56	February 13	Detroit					Moda Center	–
57	February 14	Chicago					Moda Center	–
58	February 16	New Orleans					Moda Center	–
59	February 18	Indiana					Moda Center	–
All-Star Game
60	February 26	Dallas					Moda Center	–
61	February 28	@ L.A. Clippers					Intuit Dome	–

March: 0–0 (home: 0–0; road: 0–0)

Game	Date	Team	Score	High points	High rebounds	High assists	Location Attendance	Record
62	March 2	L.A. Clippers					Moda Center	–
63	March 4	@ Cleveland					Rocket Arena	–
64	March 5	@ Toronto					Scotiabank Arena	–
65	March 7	@ Chicago					United Center	–
66	March 9	@ Golden State					Chase Center	–
67	March 10	Denver					Moda Center	–
68	March 13	L.A. Clippers					Moda Center	–
69	March 16	L.A. Lakers					Moda Center	–
70	March 17	Miami					Moda Center	–
71	March 19	@ Golden State					Chase Center	–
72	March 21	@ Phoenix					Mortgage Matchup Center	–
73	March 23	Toronto					Moda Center	–
74	March 26	Philadelphia					Moda Center	–
75	March 27	Milwaukee					Moda Center	–
76	March 30	Houston					Moda Center	–
77	March 31	Houston					Moda Center	–

April: 0–0 (home: 0–0; road: 0–0)

Game	Date	Team	Score	High points	High rebounds	High assists	Location Attendance	Record
78	April 2	Utah					Moda Center	–
79	April 4	@ Utah					Delta Center	–
80	April 7	Dallas					Moda Center	–
81	April 9	@ Houston					Toyota Center	–
82	April 11	@ San Antonio					Frost Bank Center	–

2026–27 season schedule

== NBA Cup ==
=== West Group C ===
Pos	Team	Pld	W	L	PF	PA	PD	Qualification
1	San Antonio Spurs	2	2	0	247	194	+53	Advance to knockout stage
2	Los Angeles Lakers	3	2	1	325	334	−9	Possible knockout stage based on ranking
3	Portland Trail Blazers	2	1	1	238	231	+7	
4	Golden State Warriors	2	1	1	197	218	−21	
5	Sacramento Kings	3	0	3	320	350	−30	

Updated to game(s) played on November 20, 2026. Source:

== Transactions ==
=== Trades ===
Date	Trade		Ref.
June 29, 2026	To Portland Trail Blazers: Ja Morant; Cash considerations	To Memphis Grizzlies: Jerami Grant; Kris Murray	

=== Free agency ===
==== Re-signed ====
Date	Player	Ref.

==== Additions ====
Date	Player	Former Team	Ref.
July 1, 2026	Branden Carlson	Oklahoma City Thunder	
July 10, 2026	Micah Potter	Indiana Pacers	

==== Subtractions ====
Player	Reason	New Team	Ref.
Blake Wesley	Free agency	Los Angeles Clippers	
Matisse Thybulle	Free agency	Los Angeles Lakers	
