= Northwest Division (NBA) =

Division of the National Basketball Association

- Conference: Western Conference
- League: National Basketball Association
- Sport: Basketball
- First season: 2004–05 season
- No. of teams: 5
- Most recent champion: Oklahoma City Thunder (9th title) (2025–26)
- Most titles: Oklahoma City Thunder/Seattle SuperSonics (9 titles)

Northwest Division teams' locations

The Northwest Division is one of the three divisions in the Western Conference of the National Basketball Association (NBA). The division consists of five teams: the Denver Nuggets, the Minnesota Timberwolves, the Oklahoma City Thunder, the Portland Trail Blazers and the Utah Jazz. The Northwest Division is by far the most geographically expansive of the six divisions, and is geographically similar to the Northwest Division in the National Hockey League which predated the NBA's by six years before it was dissolved in 2013.

The division was created at the start of the 2004–05 season, when the league expanded from 29 to 30 teams with the addition of the Charlotte Bobcats. In doing so, the league realigned itself from two divisions in each conference to three divisions in each conference. The Northwest Division began with five inaugural members: the Nuggets, the Timberwolves, the Trail Blazers, the SuperSonics and the Jazz. The Trail Blazers and SuperSonics joined from the Pacific Division, while the Nuggets, the Timberwolves and Jazz joined from the now-defunct Midwest Division. The SuperSonics moved to Oklahoma City prior to the 2008–09 season and became the Thunder, but remained in the Northwest Division. Other than this franchise re-location, the division's membership has remained unchanged since its creation.

The most recent division champions are the Oklahoma City Thunder, having won an eighth division championship in the 2024–25 NBA season. The SuperSonics-Thunder franchise has won the most Northwest Division titles with eight, while the Nuggets have won six, the Jazz have won five, the Trail Blazers have won two, and the Timberwolves have never won the Northwest Division title. In the 2009–10 season, all four teams that qualified for the playoffs each had more than 50 wins, and in 2018–19 all four teams that qualified for the playoffs had at least 49 wins.

Since the 2021–22 season, the Northwest Division champion has received the Sam Jones Trophy, named after Hall of Famer Sam Jones, who notably spent his career playing for the Boston Celtics and did not play for a team currently in the division, though he was assistant coach for the Jazz during their first NBA season in 1974–75 when they were based in New Orleans.

== 2026–27 standings ==
Northwest Division	W	L	PCT	GB	Home	Road	Div	GP
Oklahoma City Thunder	2	0	1.000	–	1‍–‍0	1‍–‍0	1–0	2
Portland Trail Blazers	1	0	1.000	0.5	1‍–‍0	0‍–‍0	0–0	1
Minnesota Timberwolves	1	0	1.000	0.5	0‍–‍0	1‍–‍0	0–0	1
Denver Nuggets	0	1	.000	1.5	0‍–‍0	0‍–‍1	0–1	1
Utah Jazz	0	1	.000	1.5	0‍–‍0	0‍–‍1	0–0	1

== Teams ==
Team	City	Year	From
Team	City	Joined	
Denver Nuggets	Denver, Colorado	2004	Midwest Division
Minnesota Timberwolves	Minneapolis, Minnesota	2004	Midwest Division
Oklahoma City Thunder (2008–present); Seattle SuperSonics (1967–2008)	Oklahoma City, Oklahoma; Seattle, Washington	2004	Pacific Division
Portland Trail Blazers	Portland, Oregon	2004	Pacific Division
Utah Jazz	Salt Lake City, Utah	2004	Midwest Division

== Sam Jones Trophy ==
Beginning with the 2021–22 season, the Northwest Division champion has received the Sam Jones Trophy. As with the other division championship trophies, it is named after one of the African American pioneers from NBA history. During his playing career from 1957 to 1969, Sam Jones was an integral part of a Boston Celtics dynasty that won 10 NBA championships during that span. The Jones Trophy consists of a 200-millimetre (7.9 in) crystal ball.

== Division champions ==
^	Had or tied for the best regular season record for that season

Season	Team	Record	Playoffs result
2004–05	Seattle SuperSonics	52–30 (.634)	Lost conference semifinals
2005–06	Denver Nuggets	44–38 (.537)	Lost First round
2006–07	Utah Jazz	51–31 (.622)	Lost conference finals
2007–08	Utah Jazz	54–28 (.659)	Lost conference semifinals
2008–09	Denver Nuggets	54–28 (.659)	Lost conference finals
2009–10	Denver Nuggets	53–29 (.646)	Lost First round
2010–11	Oklahoma City Thunder	55–27 (.671)	Lost conference finals
2011–12^{[a]}	Oklahoma City Thunder	47–19 (.712)	Lost NBA Finals
2012–13	Oklahoma City Thunder	60–22 (.732)	Lost conference semifinals
2013–14	Oklahoma City Thunder	59–23 (.720)	Lost conference finals
2014–15	Portland Trail Blazers	51–31 (.622)	Lost First round
2015–16	Oklahoma City Thunder	55–27 (.671)	Lost conference finals
2016–17	Utah Jazz	51–31 (.622)	Lost conference semifinals
2017–18	Portland Trail Blazers	49–33 (.598)	Lost First round
2018–19	Denver Nuggets	54–28 (.659)	Lost conference semifinals
2019–20^{[b]}	Denver Nuggets	46–27 (.630)	Lost conference finals
2020–21^{[c]}	Utah Jazz^	52–20 (.722)	Lost conference semifinals
2021–22	Utah Jazz	49–33 (.598)	Lost First round
2022–23	Denver Nuggets	53–29 (.646)	Won NBA Finals
2023–24	Oklahoma City Thunder	57–25 (.695)	Lost conference semifinals
2024–25	Oklahoma City Thunder^	68–14 (.829)	Won NBA Finals
2025–26	Oklahoma City Thunder^	64–18 (.780)	Lost conference finals

=== Titles by team ===
Team	Titles	Season(s) won
Seattle SuperSonics/Oklahoma City Thunder	9	2004–05, 2010–11, 2011–12, 2012–13, 2013–14, 2015–16, 2023–24, 2024–25, 2025–26
Denver Nuggets	6	2005–06, 2008–09, 2009–10, 2018–19, 2019–20, 2022–23
Utah Jazz	5	2006–07, 2007–08, 2016–17, 2020–21, 2021–22
Portland Trail Blazers	2	2014–15, 2017–18
Minnesota Timberwolves	0	

== Season results ==
^	Denotes team that won the NBA championship
^{+}	Denotes team that won the Conference finals, but lost the NBA Finals
*	Denotes team that qualified for the NBA Playoffs
×	Denotes team that qualified for the NBA play-in tournament

†	Denotes team that did not qualify for the 2020 NBA Bubble season restart

Season	Team (record)				
Season	1st	2nd	3rd	4th	5th
2004: The Northwest Division was formed with five inaugural members. The Portland Trail Blazers and the Seattle SuperSonics joined from the Pacific Division, while the Denver Nuggets, the Minnesota Timberwolves and the Utah Jazz joined from the Midwest Division.
2004–05	Seattle* (52–30)	Denver* (49–33)	Minnesota (44–38)	Portland (27–55)	Utah (26–56)
2005–06	Denver* (44–38)	Utah (41–41)	Seattle (35–47)	Minnesota (33–49)	Portland (21–61)
2006–07	Utah* (51–31)	Denver* (45–37)	Portland (32–50)	Minnesota (32–50)	Seattle (31–51)
2007–08	Utah* (54–28)	Denver* (50–32)	Portland (41–41)	Minnesota (22–60)	Seattle (20–62)
2008: The Seattle SuperSonics relocated and became the Oklahoma City Thunder.
2008–09	Denver* (54–28)	Portland* (54–28)	Utah* (48–34)	Minnesota (24–58)	Oklahoma City (23–59)
2009–10	Denver* (53–29)	Utah* (53–29)	Portland* (50–32)	Oklahoma City* (50–32)	Minnesota (15–67)
2010–11	Oklahoma City* (55–27)	Denver* (50–32)	Portland* (48–34)	Utah (39–43)	Minnesota (17–65)
2011–12^{[a]}	Oklahoma City+ (47–19)	Denver* (38–28)	Utah* (36–30)	Portland (28–38)	Minnesota (26–40)
2012–13	Oklahoma City* (60–22)	Denver* (57–25)	Utah (43–39)	Portland (33–49)	Minnesota (31–51)
2013–14	Oklahoma City* (59–23)	Portland* (54–28)	Minnesota (40–42)	Denver (36–46)	Utah (25–57)
2014–15	Portland* (51–31)	Oklahoma City (45–37)	Utah (38–44)	Denver (30–52)	Minnesota (16–66)
2015–16	Oklahoma City* (55–27)	Portland* (44–38)	Utah (40–42)	Denver (33–49)	Minnesota (29–53)
2016–17	Utah* (51–31)	Oklahoma City* (47–35)	Portland* (41–41)	Denver (40–42)	Minnesota (31–51)
2017–18	Portland* (49–33)	Oklahoma City* (48–34)	Utah* (48–34)	Minnesota* (47–35)	Denver (46–36)
2018–19	Denver* (54–28)	Portland* (53–29)	Utah* (50–32)	Oklahoma City* (49–33)	Minnesota (36–46)
2019–20^{[b]}	Denver* (46–27)	Oklahoma City* (44–28)	Utah* (44–28)	Portland* (35–39)	Minnesota† (19–45)
2020–21^{[c]}	Utah* (52–20)	Denver* (47–25)	Portland* (42–30)	Minnesota (23–49)	Oklahoma City (22–50)
2021–22	Utah* (49–33)	Denver* (48–34)	Minnesota* (46–36)	Portland (27–55)	Oklahoma City (24–58)
2022–23	Denver^ (53–29)	Minnesota* (42–40)	Oklahoma City× (40–42)	Utah (37–45)	Portland (33–49)
2023–24	Oklahoma City* (57–25)	Denver* (57–25)	Minnesota* (56–26)	Utah (31–51)	Portland (21–61)
2024–25	Oklahoma City^ (68–14)	Denver* (50–32)	Minnesota* (49–33)	Portland (36–46)	Utah (17–65)
2025–26	Oklahoma City* (64–18)	Denver* (54–28)	Minnesota* (49–33)	Portland* (42–40)	Utah (22–60)

== Notes ==
- ^{a 1} ^{2} Because of a lockout, the season did not start until December 25, 2011, and all 30 teams played a shortened 66-game regular season schedule.
- ^{b 1} ^{2} Due to the COVID-19 pandemic, the 82-game regular season schedule was suspended on March 11, 2020. The season was restarted on July 30 under an eight-game seeding format in the 2020 NBA Bubble to conclude the regular season and determine playoff berths. Games were played inside the ESPN Wide World of Sports Complex at Walt Disney World in Orlando, Florida.
- ^{c 1} ^{2} Due to the COVID-19 pandemic, the season did not start until December 22, 2020, and all 30 teams played a shortened 72-game regular season schedule.
