= 2026–27 Denver Nuggets season =

- Head coach: David Adelman
- President: Josh Kroenke
- General manager: Ben Tenzer
- Owners: Ann Walton Kroenke
- Arena: Ball Arena

Results
- Record: 9–5 (.643)
- Place: Division: 2nd (Northwest); Conference: 6th (Western)
- Stats at Basketball Reference

Local media
- Television: Altitude Sports and Entertainment
- Radio: KKSE

The 2026–27 Denver Nuggets season is the 51st season for the franchise in the National Basketball Association (NBA).

== Draft picks ==
Round	Pick	Player	Position	Nationality	College
1	26	Tarris Reed	C	United States	UConn
2	49	Bryce Hopkins	SF	United States	St. John's

The Nuggets entered the draft holding one first-round selection and one second-round selection. The latter was originally owned by the Atlanta Hawks and acquired from the Brooklyn Nets as the least favorable selection after Atlanta finished the previous season with a better record than the Los Angeles Clippers. They had traded their original second-round pick to the Phoenix Suns in a 2024 trade and was ultimately used by the Chicago Bulls in the draft as Denver finished the previous season with a better record than the Golden State Warriors.

== Roster ==
Denver Nuggets roster
Players

Pos.	No.	Player	Height	Weight	DOB	From
F	3	Marvin Bagley III	6 ft 10 in (2.08 m)	235 lb (107 kg)	1999-03-14	Duke
G	0	Christian Braun	6 ft 6 in (1.98 m)	220 lb (100 kg)	2001-04-17	Kansas
F	7	Trevon Brazile	6 ft 10 in (2.08 m)	220 lb (100 kg)	2003-01-07	Arkansas
G/F	10	DeMar DeRozan	6 ft 6 in (1.98 m)	220 lb (100 kg)	1989-08-07	USC
G	11	Alpha Diallo	6 ft 7 in (2.01 m)	210 lb (95 kg)	1997-06-29	Providence
F	32	Aaron Gordon	6 ft 8 in (2.03 m)	235 lb (107 kg)	1995-09-16	Arizona
F	14	DaRon Holmes II (GL)	6 ft 9 in (2.06 m)	225 lb (102 kg)	2002-09-15	Dayton
F	13	Bryce Hopkins (TW)	6 ft 7 in (2.01 m)	225 lb (102 kg)	2002-09-07	St. John's
F	23	Cameron Johnson	6 ft 8 in (2.03 m)	210 lb (95 kg)	1996-03-03	North Carolina
C	15	Nikola Jokić	6 ft 11 in (2.11 m)	284 lb (129 kg)	1995-02-19	Serbia
F	21	Spencer Jones	6 ft 7 in (2.01 m)	225 lb (102 kg)	2001-06-14	Stanford
G	5	Tyus Jones	6 ft 1 in (1.85 m)	196 lb (89 kg)	1996-05-10	Duke
G	27	Jamal Murray	6 ft 4 in (1.93 m)	215 lb (98 kg)	1997-02-23	Kentucky
G	9	Ryan Nembhard (TW)	5 ft 11 in (1.80 m)	180 lb (82 kg)	2003-03-10	Gonzaga
F/C	22	Zeke Nnaji	6 ft 10 in (2.08 m)	240 lb (109 kg)	2001-01-09	Arizona
G	1	Julian Strawther (injured)	6 ft 6 in (1.98 m)	205 lb (93 kg)	2002-04-18	Gonzaga
F	00	Cam Whitmore (TW)	6 ft 6 in (1.98 m)	230 lb (104 kg)	2004-07-08	Villanova

Coaches
Head coach
- David Adelman
Assistant(s)
- J. J. Barea
- John Beckett
- Rodney Billups
- Chase Buford
- Jared Dudley
- Dave Joerger
- Mike Moser
- Andrew Munson
- Ognjen Stojaković
- Elvis Valcarcel

Legend
- (DP) Unsigned draft pick
- (FA) Free agent
- (S) Suspended
- (GL) On assignment to G League
- (TW) Two-way affiliate player
- Injured

Roster
Updated: October 17, 2026

== Standings ==
=== Division ===
Northwest Division	W	L	PCT	GB	Home	Road	Div	GP
Minnesota Timberwolves	11	5	.688	–	7‍–‍3	4‍–‍2	3–0	16
Portland Trail Blazers	10	5	.667	0.5	3‍–‍2	7‍–‍3	4–2	15
Denver Nuggets	9	5	.643	1.0	4‍–‍3	5‍–‍2	0–2	14
Oklahoma City Thunder	10	6	.625	1.0	6‍–‍1	4‍–‍5	1–2	16
Utah Jazz	3	14	.176	8.5	1‍–‍8	2‍–‍6	0–2	17

=== Conference ===
Western Conference
#	Team	W	L	PCT	GB	GP
1	Los Angeles Lakers *	14	3	.824	–	17
2	San Antonio Spurs *	13	3	.813	0.5	16
3	Memphis Grizzlies	12	4	.750	1.5	16
4	Houston Rockets	12	5	.706	2.0	17
5	Minnesota Timberwolves *	11	5	.688	2.5	16
6	Portland Trail Blazers	10	5	.667	3.0	15
7	Denver Nuggets	9	5	.643	3.5	14
8	Oklahoma City Thunder	10	6	.625	3.5	16
9	Phoenix Suns	8	7	.533	5.0	15
10	Dallas Mavericks	8	7	.533	5.0	15
11	Golden State Warriors	8	8	.500	5.5	16
12	New Orleans Pelicans	5	12	.294	9.0	17
13	Los Angeles Clippers	4	10	.286	8.5	14
14	Utah Jazz	3	14	.176	11.0	17
15	Sacramento Kings	1	14	.067	12.0	15

== Game log ==
=== Preseason ===
2026 preseason game log
Total: 3–2 (Home: 1–1; Road: 2–1)
Preseason: 3–2 (home: 1–1; road: 2–1)

Game	Date	Team	Score	High points	High rebounds	High assists	Location Attendance	Record
1	October 4	Utah	L 97–109	Julian Strawther (14)	Marvin Bagley III (7)	Nikola Jokić (7)	CU Events Center; 7,860	0–1
2	October 6	@ Utah	W 117–106	Aaron Gordon (18)	Bagley III, Gordon (5)	Tyus Jones (6)	Delta Center; 13,959	1–1
3	October 11	Chicago	W 133–128	Aaron Gordon (25)	Nikola Jokić (11)	Nikola Jokić (10)	Ball Arena	2–1
4	October 14	@ L.A. Clippers	L 110–122	Trevon Brazile (22)	Tied (6)	Jokić, T. Jones (7)	Intuit Dome; 13,018	2–2
5	October 16	@ L.A. Lakers	W 121–106	Jamal Murray (21)	Bagley III, Brazile (8)	Jokić, T. Jones (8)	Crypto.com Arena; 19,057	3–2

2026–27 preseason schedule

=== Regular season ===
2026–27 game log
Total: 9–5 (Home: 4–3; Road: 5–2)
October: 3–2 (home: 1–1; road: 2–1)

Game	Date	Team	Score	High points	High rebounds	High assists	Location Attendance	Record
1	October 22	@ Oklahoma City	L 84–96	Aaron Gordon (20)	Trevon Brazile (12)	Nikola Jokić (5)	Paycom Center; 18,203	0–1
2	October 24	New Orleans	W 141–135 (OT)	Jamal Murray (42)	Nikola Jokić (15)	Nikola Jokić (10)	Ball Arena; 19,905	1–1
3	October 26	Golden State	L 114–134	DeMar DeRozan (21)	Nikola Jokić (7)	Nikola Jokić (11)	Ball Arena; 19,520	1–2
4	October 28	@ New Orleans	W 104–91	Jamal Murray (23)	Nikola Jokić (13)	Nikola Jokić (10)	Smoothie King Center; 16,334	2–2
5	October 30	@ Phoenix	W 127–120	Jamal Murray (39)	Cameron Johnson (9)	Nikola Jokić (10)	Mortgage Matchup Center; 17,071	3–2

November: 6–3 (home: 3–2; road: 3–1)

Game	Date	Team	Score	High points	High rebounds	High assists	Location Attendance	Record
6	November 2	Portland	L 110–118	Jamal Murray (35)	Nikola Jokić (9)	Nikola Jokić (8)	Ball Arena; 19,520	3–3
7	November 4	Toronto	W 128–109	Nikola Jokić (32)	Nikola Jokić (10)	Nikola Jokić (11)	Ball Arena; 19,520	4–3
8	November 7	@ Indiana	W 114–102	Nikola Jokić (19)	Nikola Jokić (13)	Jokić, Murray (8)	Mexico City Arena; 20,191	5–3
9	November 9	@ Houston	L 100–110	Jamal Murray (38)	Nikola Jokić (16)	Nikola Jokić (9)	Toyota Center; 18,055	5–4
10	November 11	@ Memphis	W 123–118	Jamal Murray (30)	Nikola Jokić (11)	Jokić, Murray (8)	FedExForum; 13,917	6–4
11	November 14	@ New Orleans	W 116–108	Nikola Jokić (26)	Nikola Jokić (8)	Nikola Jokić (10)	Smoothie King Center; 15,721	7–4
12	November 16	Phoenix	L 105–117	Jokić, Murray (28)	Nikola Jokić (15)	Nikola Jokić (7)	Ball Arena; 19,620	7–5
13	November 18	Boston	W 105–101	Nikola Jokić (24)	Gordon, Jokić (8)	Nikola Jokić (9)	Ball Arena; 19,520	8–5
14	November 20	Houston	W 133–124	Nikola Jokić (26)	Nikola Jokić (7)	Nikola Jokić (11)	Ball Arena; 19,566	9–5
15	November 22	@ Chicago					United Center	–
16	November 24	Dallas					Ball Arena	–
17	November 27	@ Utah					Delta Center	–
18	November 29	@ Toronto					Scotiabank Arena	–
19	November 30	@ Detroit					Little Caesars Arena	–

December: 0–0 (home: 0–0; road: 0–0)

Game	Date	Team	Score	High points	High rebounds	High assists	Location Attendance	Record
20	December 2	@ Philadelphia					Xfinity Mobile Arena	–
21	TBD	TBD					TBD	–
22	TBD	TBD					TBD	–
23	December 12	@ Utah					Delta Center	–
24	December 15	@ Portland					Moda Center	–
25	December 17	Atlanta					Ball Arena	–
26	December 19	L.A. Lakers					Ball Arena	–
27	December 21	@ L.A. Clippers					Intuit Dome	–
28	December 23	@ L.A. Lakers					Crypto.com Arena	–
29	December 25	@ Golden State					Chase Center	–
30	December 27	Indiana					Ball Arena	–
31	December 28	Minnesota					Ball Arena	–
32	December 31	@ Minnesota					Target Center	–

January: 0–0 (home: 0–0; road: 0–0)

Game	Date	Team	Score	High points	High rebounds	High assists	Location Attendance	Record
33	January 2	New York					Ball Arena	–
34	January 3	Detroit					Ball Arena	–
35	January 5	Phoenix					Ball Arena	–
36	January 7	@ Charlotte					Spectrum Center	–
37	January 9	@ Cleveland					Rocket Arena	–
38	January 11	@ New York					Madison Square Garden	–
39	January 12	@ Milwaukee					Fiserv Forum	–
40	January 14	Memphis					Ball Arena	–
41	January 16	Charlotte					Ball Arena	–
42	January 17	Orlando					Ball Arena	–
43	January 19	Utah					Ball Arena	–
44	January 21	Washington					Ball Arena	–
45	January 23	Milwaukee					Ball Arena	–
46	January 25	Sacramento					Ball Arena	–
47	January 27	@ Minnesota					Target Center	–
48	January 30	@ Oklahoma City					Paycom Center	–
49	January 31	Portland					Ball Arena	–

February: 0–0 (home: 0–0; road: 0–0)

Game	Date	Team	Score	High points	High rebounds	High assists	Location Attendance	Record
50	February 2	Oklahoma City					Ball Arena	–
51	February 4	Dallas					Ball Arena	–
52	February 5	L.A. Clippers					Ball Arena	–
53	February 7	@ Atlanta					State Farm Arena	–
54	February 9	@ Boston					TD Garden	–
55	February 11	Chicago					Ball Arena	–
56	February 12	@ L.A. Lakers					Crypto.com Arena	–
57	February 14	@ Houston					Toyota Center	–
58	February 17	Utah					Ball Arena	–
All-Star Game
59	February 26	L.A. Lakers					Ball Arena	–
60	February 28	@ San Antonio					Moody Center	–

March: 0–0 (home: 0–0; road: 0–0)

Game	Date	Team	Score	High points	High rebounds	High assists	Location Attendance	Record
61	March 1	Brooklyn					Ball Arena	–
62	March 3	San Antonio					Ball Arena	–
63	March 7	Minnesota					Ball Arena	–
64	March 8	@ Sacramento					Golden 1 Center	–
65	March 10	@ Portland					Moda Center	–
66	March 12	Golden State					Ball Arena	–
67	March 14	Miami					Ball Arena	–
68	March 16	@ L.A. Clippers					Intuit Dome	–
69	March 18	Cleveland					Ball Arena	–
70	March 20	@ Orlando					Kia Center	–
71	March 21	@ Miami					Kaseya Center	–
72	March 24	@ Washington					Capital One Arena	–
73	March 25	@ Brooklyn					Barclays Center	–
74	March 28	Philadelphia					Ball Arena	–
75	March 29	@ Sacramento					Golden 1 Center	–
76	March 31	@ Dallas					American Airlines Center	–

April: 0–0 (home: 0–0; road: 0–0)

Game	Date	Team	Score	High points	High rebounds	High assists	Location Attendance	Record
77	April 2	@ Phoenix					Mortgage Matchup Center	–
78	April 4	Memphis					Ball Arena	–
79	April 6	New Orleans					Ball Arena	–
80	April 8	L.A. Clippers					Ball Arena	–
81	April 9	@ San Antonio					Frost Bank Center	–
82	April 11	Oklahoma City					Ball Arena	–

2026–27 season schedule

== NBA Cup ==
=== West Group A ===
Pos	Team	Pld	W	L	PF	PA	PD	Qualification
1	Dallas Mavericks	2	2	0	228	211	+17	Advance to knockout stage
2	Denver Nuggets	2	2	0	260	244	+16	Possible knockout stage based on ranking
3	Phoenix Suns	2	1	1	231	228	+3	
4	Houston Rockets	3	1	2	360	367	−7	
5	Utah Jazz	3	0	3	319	348	−29	

Updated to game(s) played on November 20, 2026. Source:

== Transactions ==
=== Trades ===
Date	Trade		Ref.
June 23, 2026	To Denver Nuggets: 2026 UTA second-round pick (No. 35); 2028 MIN second-round pick; 2031 SAC second-round pick	To San Antonio Spurs: Draft rights to Tarris Reed (No. 26)	
August 20, 2026
August 20, 2026	Five-team trade		
August 20, 2026	To Charlotte Hornets: Dennis Schröder (from Cleveland); Cash considerations (from Cleveland)	To Cleveland Cavaliers: Peyton Watson (sign-and-trade) (from Denver); Cam Whitmore (from Washington); Draft rights to Ismaël Kamagate (2022 No. 46) (from Los Angeles)	
August 20, 2026	To Denver Nuggets: Julian Reese (two-way contract) (from Washington); 2031 CLE first-round pick (from Cleveland); 2032 SAC second-round pick (from Cleveland)	To Los Angeles Clippers: Max Strus (from Cleveland)	
August 20, 2026	To Washington Wizards: Tre Mann (from Charlotte); 2027 second-round pick (Note: Los Angeles Clippers will receive the second most favorable pick out of three possibilities: 1) the most favorable of the picks originally belonging to Houston Rockets, Indiana Pacers, Miami Heat, and Oklahoma City Thunder; 2) the more favorable of the picks originally belonging to Golden State Warriors and Phoenix Suns; 3) Philadelphia 76ers' own pick.) (from Los Angeles); Cash considerations (from Cleveland)		

=== Free agency ===
==== Re-signed ====
Date	Player	Ref.
July 14, 2026	Tyus Jones	
July 26, 2026	Spencer Jones	

==== Additions ====
Date	Player	Former Team	Ref.
July 13, 2026	Alpha Diallo	(France) AS Monaco Basket	
July 15, 2026	Marvin Bagley III	Dallas Mavericks	
September 8, 2026	DeMar DeRozan	Sacramento Kings	

==== Subtractions ====
Player	Reason	New Team	Ref.
Tim Hardaway Jr.	Free agency	Miami Heat	
Jonas Valančiūnas	Waived	(Lithuania) Žalgiris	
David Roddy	Free agency	(Israel) Hapoel Jerusalem	
