= 2026–27 Golden State Warriors season =

- Head coach: Steve Kerr
- President: Brandon Schneider
- General manager: Mike Dunleavy Jr.
- Owners: Joe Lacob; Peter Guber
- Arena: Chase Center

Results
- Record: 8–8 (.500)
- Place: Division: 3rd (Pacific); Conference: 11th (Western)
- Stats at Basketball Reference

Local media
- Television: NBC Sports Bay Area
- Radio: 95.7 The Game

The 2026–27 Golden State Warriors season is the 81st season of the franchise in the National Basketball Association (NBA), their 65th in the San Francisco Bay Area, and their eighth season at the Chase Center.

== Draft picks ==
Round	Pick	Player	Position	Nationality	College	Ref.
1	11	Yaxel Lendeborg	SF/PF	Dominican Republic / United States	Michigan (Sr.)	
2	54	Lajae Jones	SG/SF	United States	Florida State (Sr.)	

The Warriors entered the draft holding one first-round selection and one second-round selection, the latter of which was originally owned by the Los Angeles Lakers acquired through a previous trade with the Toronto Raptors. They had traded their original second-round pick selection to the Atlanta Hawks in 2019 and the pick was used by the Miami Heat in the draft.

== Roster ==
Golden State Warriors roster
Players

Pos.	No.	Player	Height	Weight	DOB	From
F/C	28	Charles Bassey	6 ft 9 in (2.06 m)	244 lb (111 kg)	2000-10-28	Western Kentucky
F	10	Jimmy Butler III (injured)	6 ft 6 in (1.98 m)	230 lb (104 kg)	1989-09-14	Marquette
G	18	LJ Cryer (TW)	6 ft 0 in (1.83 m)	197 lb (89 kg)	2001-10-09	Houston
G	30	Stephen Curry (injured)	6 ft 2 in (1.88 m)	205 lb (93 kg)	1988-03-14	Davidson
F/C	23	Draymond Green	6 ft 6 in (1.98 m)	240 lb (109 kg)	1990-03-04	Michigan State
C	20	Al Horford	6 ft 8 in (2.03 m)	260 lb (118 kg)	1986-06-03	Florida
F/C	45	Graham Ike (TW)	6 ft 10 in (2.08 m)	257 lb (117 kg)	2002-08-03	Gonzaga
F	1	Yaxel Lendeborg	6 ft 9 in (2.06 m)	247 lb (112 kg)	2002-09-30	Michigan
F	33	Malevy Leons (TW)	6 ft 9 in (2.06 m)	206 lb (93 kg)	1999-09-23	Bradley
F	32	Georges Niang	6 ft 7 in (2.01 m)	245 lb (111 kg)	1993-06-17	Iowa State
G	8	De'Anthony Melton	6 ft 2 in (1.88 m)	199 lb (90 kg)	1998-05-28	USC
G	4	Moses Moody (injured)	6 ft 5 in (1.96 m)	217 lb (98 kg)	2002-05-31	Arkansas
G	0	Gary Payton II	6 ft 2 in (1.88 m)	192 lb (87 kg)	1992-12-01	Oregon State
G	2	Brandin Podziemski	6 ft 4 in (1.93 m)	208 lb (94 kg)	2003-02-25	Santa Clara
F/C	7	Kristaps Porziņģis (injured)	7 ft 2 in (2.18 m)	240 lb (109 kg)	1995-08-02	Latvia
G	3	Will Richard	6 ft 3 in (1.91 m)	207 lb (94 kg)	2002-12-24	Florida
F	15	Gui Santos	6 ft 7 in (2.01 m)	225 lb (102 kg)	2002-06-22	Brazil
G	12	Brandon Williams (injured)	6 ft 1 in (1.85 m)	185 lb (84 kg)	1999-11-22	Arizona

Coaches
Head coach
- Steve Kerr
Assistant(s)
- Frank Vogel (Associate HC)
- Ron Adams
- Seth Cooper
- Bruce Fraser
- Nick Kerr
- Khalid Robinson
- Jacob Rubin
- Anthony Vereen
- Kris Weems
- Drew Yoder

Legend
- (DP) Unsigned draft pick
- (FA) Free agent
- (S) Suspended
- (GL) On assignment to G League affiliate
- (TW) Two-way affiliate player
- Injured

Roster
Updated: October 17, 2026

== Standings ==
=== Division ===
Pacific Division	W	L	PCT	GB	Home	Road	Div	GP
Los Angeles Lakers	14	3	.824	–	7‍–‍2	7‍–‍1	6–1	17
Phoenix Suns	8	7	.533	5.0	5‍–‍4	3‍–‍3	3–2	15
Golden State Warriors	8	8	.500	5.5	6‍–‍1	2‍–‍7	3–2	16
Los Angeles Clippers	4	10	.286	8.5	4‍–‍4	0‍–‍6	1–4	14
Sacramento Kings	1	14	.067	12.0	0‍–‍9	1‍–‍5	0–4	15

=== Conference ===
Western Conference
#	Team	W	L	PCT	GB	GP
1	Los Angeles Lakers *	14	3	.824	–	17
2	San Antonio Spurs *	13	3	.813	0.5	16
3	Memphis Grizzlies	12	4	.750	1.5	16
4	Houston Rockets	12	5	.706	2.0	17
5	Minnesota Timberwolves *	11	5	.688	2.5	16
6	Portland Trail Blazers	10	5	.667	3.0	15
7	Denver Nuggets	9	5	.643	3.5	14
8	Oklahoma City Thunder	10	6	.625	3.5	16
9	Phoenix Suns	8	7	.533	5.0	15
10	Dallas Mavericks	8	7	.533	5.0	15
11	Golden State Warriors	8	8	.500	5.5	16
12	New Orleans Pelicans	5	12	.294	9.0	17
13	Los Angeles Clippers	4	10	.286	8.5	14
14	Utah Jazz	3	14	.176	11.0	17
15	Sacramento Kings	1	14	.067	12.0	15

== Game log ==
=== Preseason ===
2026 preseason game log
Total: 4–2 (Home: 3–0; Road: 1–2)
Preseason: 4–2 (home: 3–0; road: 1–2)

Game	Date	Team	Score	High points	High rebounds	High assists	Location Attendance	Record
1	October 4	@ L.A. Clippers	L 101–104	Charles Bassey (12)	Yaxel Lendeborg (9)	Lendeborg, Williams (3)	Stan Sheriff Center; 10,112	0–1
2	October 6	L.A. Lakers	W 124–98	Yaxel Lendeborg (17)	Yaxel Lendeborg (9)	Draymond Green (8)	Chase Center	1–1
3	October 7	@ Portland	L 118–123	Miles Kelly (24)	Dalen Terry (8)	Dalen Terry (9)	Moda Center	1–2
4	October 10	Sacramento	W 111–106	Yaxel Lendeborg (23)	Yaxel Lendeborg (10)	Yaxel Lendeborg (6)	Chase Center	2–2
5	October 13	@ L.A. Lakers	W 101–89	Lendeborg, Podziemski (17)	Charles Bassey (12)	Yaxel Lendeborg (4)	T-Mobile Arena; 7,471	3–2
6	October 16	Portland	W 128–118	Stephen Curry (20)	Draymond Green (8)	Draymond Green (10)	Chase Center; 18,064	4–2

2026–27 preseason schedule

=== Regular season ===
2026–27 game log
Total: 8–8 (Home: 6–1; Road: 2–7)
October: 3–3 (home: 1–1; road: 2–2)

Game	Date	Team	Score	High points	High rebounds	High assists	Location Attendance	Record
1	October 21	@ L.A. Lakers	L 105–127	Stephen Curry (23)	Richard, Santos (5)	Draymond Green (8)	Crypto.com Arena; 19,057	0–1
2	October 23	Memphis	L 108–111	Stephen Curry (24)	Yaxel Lendeborg (13)	Green, Lendeborg (6)	Chase Center; 18,064	0–2
3	October 24	@ Phoenix	L 122–131	Yaxel Lendeborg (26)	Graham Ike (10)	Tied (5)	Mortgage Matchup Center; 17,071	0–3
4	October 26	@ Denver	W 134–114	Yaxel Lendeborg (31)	Yaxel Lendeborg (12)	Draymond Green (7)	Ball Arena; 19,520	1–3
5	October 28	@ Minnesota	W 119–114	Stephen Curry (44)	Tied (8)	Draymond Green (7)	Target Center; 16,588	2–3
6	October 30	L.A. Lakers	W 112–95	Stephen Curry (31)	Tied (5)	Draymond Green (9)	Chase Center; 18,064	3–3

November: 5–5 (home: 5–0; road: 0–5)

Game	Date	Team	Score	High points	High rebounds	High assists	Location Attendance	Record
7	November 1	L.A. Clippers	W 124–112	Yaxel Lendeborg (37)	Charles Bassey (10)	Brandin Podziemski (8)	Chase Center; 18,064	4–3
8	November 2	Phoenix	W 116–113	Stephen Curry (34)	Charles Bassey (8)	Stephen Curry (7)	Chase Center; 18,064	5–3
9	November 5	Miami	W 120–100	Stephen Curry (29)	Yaxel Lendeborg (8)	Draymond Green (11)	Chase Center; 18,064	6–3
10	November 7	Orlando	W 126–119 (OT)	Stephen Curry (41)	Yaxel Lendeborg (8)	Draymond Green (13)	Chase Center; 18,064	7–3
11	November 9	New Orleans	W 138–87	Curry, Podziemski (25)	Charles Bassey (10)	Green, Horford (6)	Chase Center; 18,064	8–3
12	November 11	@ Houston	L 108–115	Yaxel Lendeborg (25)	Yaxel Lendeborg (10)	Draymond Green (7)	Toyota Center; 18,055	8–4
13	November 13	@ San Antonio	L 85–123	LJ Cryer (20)	Yaxel Lendeborg (7)	LJ Cryer (6)	Frost Bank Center; 18,849	8–5
14	November 16	@ New Orleans	L 94–115	Yaxel Lendeborg (28)	Green, Lendeborg (8)	Draymond Green (5)	Smoothie King Center	8–6
15	November 18	@ Dallas	L 94–116	Will Richard (20)	Bassey, Payton II (8)	Gui Santos (6)	American Airlines Center; 19,616	8–7
16	November 19	@ Memphis	L 98–126	Charles Bassey (16)	Charles Bassey (13)	Yaxel Lendeborg (7)	FedExForum; 15,019	8–8
17	November 22	Boston					Chase Center	–
18	November 25	Sacramento					Chase Center	–
19	November 27	@ Portland					Moda Center	–
20	November 29	L.A. Clippers					Chase Center	–

December: 0–0 (home: 0–0; road: 0–0)

Game	Date	Team	Score	High points	High rebounds	High assists	Location Attendance	Record
21	December 1	Utah					Chase Center	–
22	TBD	TBD					TBD	–
23	TBD	TBD					TBD	–
24	December 12	@ Cleveland					Rocket Arena	–
25	December 14	@ Memphis					FedExForum	–
26	December 16	@ Indiana					Gainbridge Fieldhouse	–
27	December 18	@ Toronto					Scotiabank Arena	–
28	December 20	@ Milwaukee					Fiserv Forum	–
29	December 22	Dallas					Chase Center	–
30	December 23	@ L.A. Clippers					Intuit Dome	–
31	December 25	Denver					Chase Center	–
32	December 27	Minnesota					Chase Center	–
33	December 28	@ Phoenix					Mortgage Matchup Center	–
34	December 30	Houston					Chase Center	–

January: 0–0 (home: 0–0; road: 0–0)

Game	Date	Team	Score	High points	High rebounds	High assists	Location Attendance	Record
35	January 2	Brooklyn					Chase Center	–
36	January 6	New York					Chase Center	–
37	January 7	Detroit					Chase Center	–
38	January 9	Chicago					Chase Center	–
39	January 12	Sacramento					Chase Center	–
40	January 13	Charlotte					Chase Center	–
41	January 15	@ Atlanta					State Farm Arena	–
42	January 17	@ Miami					Kaseya Center	–
43	January 19	@ Orlando					Kia Center	–
44	January 21	L.A. Lakers					Chase Center	–
45	January 22	Milwaukee					Chase Center	–
46	January 24	Oklahoma City					Chase Center	–
47	January 27	@ Portland					Moda Center	–
48	January 28	@ Utah					Delta Center	–
49	January 30	San Antonio					Chase Center	–

February: 0–0 (home: 0–0; road: 0–0)

Game	Date	Team	Score	High points	High rebounds	High assists	Location Attendance	Record
50	February 1	San Antonio					Chase Center	–
51	February 3	@ L.A. Clippers					Intuit Dome	–
52	February 5	@ Charlotte					Spectrum Center	–
53	February 7	@ Detroit					Little Caesars Arena	–
54	February 9	@ Chicago					United Center	–
55	February 10	@ Boston					TD Garden	–
56	February 13	@ New York					Madison Square Garden	–
57	February 15	Indiana					Chase Center	–
58	February 17	New Orleans					Chase Center	–
All-Star Game
59	February 25	Dallas					Chase Center	–

March: 0–0 (home: 0–0; road: 0–0)

Game	Date	Team	Score	High points	High rebounds	High assists	Location Attendance	Record
60	March 1	@ Houston					Toyota Center	–
61	March 2	@ Dallas					American Airlines Center	–
62	March 4	Washington					Chase Center	–
63	March 7	Houston					Chase Center	–
64	March 9	Portland					Chase Center	–
65	March 10	@ Sacramento					Golden 1 Center	–
66	March 12	@ Denver					Ball Arena	–
67	March 14	@ L.A. Lakers					Crypto.com Arena	–
68	March 16	Cleveland					Chase Center	–
69	March 17	Memphis					Chase Center	–
70	March 19	Portland					Chase Center	–
71	March 22	Atlanta					Chase Center	–
72	March 24	Philadelphia					Chase Center	–
73	March 25	Toronto					Chase Center	–
74	March 27	@ Washington					Capital One Arena	–
75	March 29	@ Brooklyn					Barclays Center	–
76	March 31	@ Philadelphia					Xfinity Mobile Arena	–

April: 0–0 (home: 0–0; road: 0–0)

Game	Date	Team	Score	High points	High rebounds	High assists	Location Attendance	Record
77	April 2	@ Minnesota					Target Center	–
78	April 4	@ Sacramento					Golden 1 Center	–
79	April 6	Phoenix					Chase Center	–
80	April 8	@ Oklahoma City					Paycom Center	–
81	April 9	@ Oklahoma City					Paycom Center	–
82	April 11	Utah					Chase Center	–

2026–27 season schedule

== NBA Cup ==
=== West Group C ===
Pos	Team	Pld	W	L	PF	PA	PD	Qualification
1	San Antonio Spurs	2	2	0	247	194	+53	Advance to knockout stage
2	Los Angeles Lakers	3	2	1	325	334	−9	Possible knockout stage based on ranking
3	Portland Trail Blazers	2	1	1	238	231	+7	
4	Golden State Warriors	2	1	1	197	218	−21	
5	Sacramento Kings	3	0	3	320	350	−30	

Updated to game(s) played on November 20, 2026. Source:

== Transactions ==
=== Trades ===
Date	Trade	Ref.

=== Free agency ===
==== Re-signed ====
Date	Player	Ref.
June 30, 2026	(Latvia) Kristaps Porziņģis	
July 6, 2026	(Dominican Republic) Al Horford	
July 9, 2026	(Nigeria) Charles Bassey	
July 30, 2026	(United States) Draymond Green	
August 1, 2026	(United States) De'Anthony Melton	
August 1, 2026	(United States) Gary Payton II	

==== Additions ====
Date	Player	Former Team	Ref.
July 1, 2026	(Dominican Republic) Yaxel Lendeborg	Michigan Wolverines (Sr.)	
August 25, 2026	(United States) Georges Niang	Atlanta Hawks	
August 26, 2026	(United States) Brandon Williams	Dallas Mavericks	
August 27, 2026	(United States) Dalen Terry	Philadelphia 76ers	
September 10, 2026	(Australia) Alex Toohey	Santa Cruz Warriors (NBA G League)	
September 21, 2026	(United States) Graham Ike	Gonzaga Bulldogs (Sr.)	
September 27, 2026	(United States) Miles Kelly	Dallas Mavericks	
October 11, 2026	(United States) Tyler Burton	Memphis Grizzlies	

==== Subtractions ====
Date	Player	Reason	New Team	Ref.
July 3, 2026	(United States) Pat Spencer	Free agency	Phoenix Suns	
July 8, 2026	(Netherlands) Quinten Post	Free agency	Memphis Grizzlies	
July 17, 2026	(United States) Nate Williams	Free agency	Chiba Jets (Japan)	
September 21, 2026	(United States) Lajae Jones	Unsigned draft pick	Pallacanestro Trieste (Italy)	
TBA	(United States) Seth Curry	Free agency	—N/a	
