= 2026–27 Boston Celtics season =

- Head coach: Joe Mazzulla
- President: Rich Gotham
- General manager: Brad Stevens
- Owners: Bill Chisholm
- Arena: TD Garden

Results
- Record: 11–5 (.688)
- Place: Division: 2nd (Atlantic); Conference: 2nd (Eastern)
- Stats at Basketball Reference

Local media
- Television: NBC Sports Boston
- Radio: WBZ-FM

The 2026–27 Boston Celtics season is the 81st season of the franchise in the National Basketball Association (NBA). This is the first season since 2015–16 that Jaylen Brown is not on the opening day roster, as he was traded to the Philadelphia 76ers on July 1 for Paul George and four future draft picks.

== Draft picks ==
Round	Pick	Player	Position	Nationality	College
1	27	Chris Cenac	PF	United States	Houston
2	40	Dillon Mitchell	SF	United States	St. John's

The Celtics entered the draft holding their original first-round selection and a second-round selection acquired through a previous trade. The Celtics acquired the latter from the Orlando Magic as part of a trade in 2025, having originated with the Milwaukee Bucks, whose unfavorable record in the 2025–26 NBA season ensured the pick's conveyance. The Celtics had also traded away their original second-round pick to the Atlanta Hawks as part of the 2025 Kristaps Porziņģis three-team trade, conveying as the less favorable selection after finishing with a better record than the Memphis Grizzlies.

== Roster ==
Boston Celtics roster
Players

Pos.	No.	Player	Height	Weight	DOB	From
G	99	Devin Carter (TW)	6 ft 2 in (1.88 m)	199 lb (90 kg)	2002-03-18	Providence
F	12	Chris Cenac Jr. (GL)	6 ft 11 in (2.11 m)	240 lb (109 kg)	2007-02-01	Houston
G	45	Mike Conley	6 ft 0 in (1.83 m)	182 lb (83 kg)	1987-10-11	Ohio State
C	52	Luka Garza	6 ft 10 in (2.08 m)	252 lb (114 kg)	1998-12-27	Iowa
F	13	Paul George	6 ft 8 in (2.03 m)	230 lb (104 kg)	1990-05-02	Fresno State
G	28	Hugo González	6 ft 6 in (1.98 m)	200 lb (91 kg)	2006-02-04	Spain
G/F	8	Ron Harper Jr.	6 ft 5 in (1.96 m)	231 lb (105 kg)	2000-04-12	Rutgers
F	30	Sam Hauser	6 ft 7 in (2.01 m)	217 lb (98 kg)	1997-12-08	Virginia
F	20	Dillon Mitchell (TW)	6 ft 6 in (1.98 m)	200 lb (91 kg)	2003-10-03	St. John's
G	11	Payton Pritchard	6 ft 1 in (1.85 m)	212 lb (96 kg)	1998-01-28	Oregon
C	88	Neemias Queta	7 ft 0 in (2.13 m)	270 lb (122 kg)	1999-07-13	Utah State
F/C	4	Mitchell Robinson	7 ft 0 in (2.13 m)	245 lb (111 kg)	1998-04-01	Chalmette HS (LA)
G	55	Baylor Scheierman	6 ft 6 in (1.98 m)	213 lb (97 kg)	2000-09-26	Creighton
G/F	0	Jayson Tatum	6 ft 8 in (2.03 m)	229 lb (104 kg)	1998-03-03	Duke
G	27	Jordan Walsh	6 ft 6 in (1.98 m)	210 lb (95 kg)	2004-03-03	Arkansas
G	9	Derrick White	6 ft 4 in (1.93 m)	200 lb (91 kg)	1994-07-02	Colorado
F/C	77	Amari Williams (TW)	6 ft 11 in (2.11 m)	269 lb (122 kg)	2002-01-28	Kentucky

Coaches
Head coach
- Joe Mazzulla
Assistant(s)
- Sam Cassell
- Tony Dobbins
- D. J. MacLeay
- Amile Jefferson
- Matt Reynolds
- Ross McMains
- Tyler Lashbrook
- Craig Luschenat

Legend
- (DP) Unsigned draft pick
- (FA) Free agent
- (S) Suspended
- (GL) On assignment to G League affiliate
- (TW) Two-way affiliate player
- Injured

Roster
Updated: October 20, 2026

== Standings ==
=== Division ===
Atlantic Division	W	L	PCT	GB	Home	Road	Div	GP
Philadelphia 76ers	13	3	.813	–	6‍–‍2	7‍–‍1	4–1	16
Boston Celtics	11	4	.733	1.5	6‍–‍1	5‍–‍3	4–0	15
New York Knicks	9	6	.600	3.5	4‍–‍3	5‍–‍3	3–3	15
Toronto Raptors	6	10	.375	7.0	2‍–‍6	4‍–‍4	0–4	16
Brooklyn Nets	3	12	.200	9.5	1‍–‍6	2‍–‍6	0–3	15

=== Conference ===
Eastern Conference
#	Team	W	L	PCT	GB	GP
1	Philadelphia 76ers *	13	3	.813	–	16
2	Boston Celtics	11	4	.733	1.5	15
3	Detroit Pistons *	10	5	.667	2.5	15
4	Atlanta Hawks *	10	6	.625	3.0	16
5	Miami Heat	9	6	.600	3.5	15
6	New York Knicks	9	6	.600	3.5	15
7	Cleveland Cavaliers	9	8	.529	4.5	17
8	Orlando Magic	7	8	.467	5.5	15
9	Toronto Raptors	6	10	.375	7.0	16
10	Washington Wizards	6	11	.353	7.5	17
11	Indiana Pacers	5	11	.313	8.0	16
12	Charlotte Hornets	4	11	.267	8.5	15
13	Chicago Bulls	4	11	.267	8.5	15
14	Brooklyn Nets	3	12	.200	9.5	15
15	Milwaukee Bucks	1	15	.063	12.0	16

== Game log ==
=== Preseason ===
2026 preseason game log
Total: 4–0 (Home: 2–0; Road: 2–0)
Preseason: 4–0 (home: 2–0; road: 2–0)

Game	Date	Team	Score	High points	High rebounds	High assists	Location Attendance	Record
1	October 8	@ Cleveland	W 124–113	Luka Garza (22)	Luka Garza (10)	Hugo González (5)	Rocket Arena; 15,464	1–0
2	October 10	Philadelphia	W 144–106	Payton Pritchard (25)	Neemias Queta (10)	Baylor Scheierman (8)	TD Garden; 19,156	2–0
3	October 14	Charlotte	W 114–93	Jayson Tatum (19)	Jayson Tatum (8)	Payton Pritchard (11)	TD Garden; 19,156	3–0
4	October 16	@ Philadelphia	W 125–120 (OT)	Hugo González (21)	Gabe McGlothan (13)	Hayden Gray (7)	Xfinity Mobile Arena; 19,746	4–0

2026–27 preseason schedule

=== Regular season ===
2026–27 game log
Total: 11–5 (Home: 5–1; Road: 6–4)
October: 4–1 (home: 4–0; road: 0–1)

Game	Date	Team	Score	High points	High rebounds	High assists	Location Attendance	Record
1	October 20	@ Detroit	L 113–121	Paul George (38)	Jordan Walsh (6)	Jayson Tatum (11)	Little Caesars Arena; 20,178	0–1
2	October 23	New York	W 107–103	Jayson Tatum (36)	Jayson Tatum (9)	Jayson Tatum (7)	TD Garden; 19,156	1–1
3	October 26	Chicago	W 134–99	Payton Pritchard (28)	Robinson, Tatum (7)	Jayson Tatum (6)	TD Garden; 19,156	2–1
4	October 27	Brooklyn	W 125–124 (OT)	Jayson Tatum (40)	Paul George (7)	Jayson Tatum (8)	TD Garden; 19,156	3–1
5	October 30	Chicago	W 125–111	Payton Pritchard (30)	Jayson Tatum (7)	Paul George (8)	TD Garden; 19,156	4–1

November: 7–4 (home: 1–1; road: 6–3)

Game	Date	Team	Score	High points	High rebounds	High assists	Location Attendance	Record
6	November 1	@ Orlando	W 108–97	Jayson Tatum (32)	Neemias Queta (8)	Paul George (8)	Kia Center; 18,236	5–1
7	November 2	@ Houston	L 93–109	Jayson Tatum (19)	Queta, Tatum (9)	Jayson Tatum (9)	Toyota Center; 18,055	5–2
8	November 4	Milwaukee	W 109–102	Paul George (25)	Neemias Queta (12)	Derrick White (7)	TD Garden; 19,156	6–2
9	November 6	@ Charlotte	W 119–80	Jayson Tatum (34)	Jayson Tatum (8)	Jayson Tatum (9)	Spectrum Center; 19,586	7–2
10	November 8	@ Milwaukee	W 117–97	Paul George (27)	Neemias Queta (9)	Derrick White (7)	Fiserv Forum; 13,402	8–2
11	November 10	@ Philadelphia	W 123–101	Paul George (36)	Tied (6)	Payton Pritchard (5)	Xfinity Mobile Arena; 21,497	9–2
12	November 11	@ Toronto	W 98–93	Jayson Tatum (24)	Neemias Queta (13)	Jayson Tatum (8)	Scotiabank Arena; 19,800	10–2
13	November 15	Dallas	W 131–94	Paul George (33)	Tied (7)	Tied (6)	TD Garden; 19,156	11–2
14	November 16	Orlando	L 105–115	Jayson Tatum (24)	Jayson Tatum (12)	Payton Pritchard (5)	TD Garden; 19,156	11–3
15	November 18	@ Denver	L 101–105	Jayson Tatum (24)	Neemias Queta (10)	Derrick White (8)	Ball Arena; 19,520	11–4
16	November 21	@ Sacramento	L 96–97	Paul George (19)	Paul George (8)	Payton Pritchard (8)	Golden 1 Center; 15,416	11–5
17	November 22	@ Golden State					Chase Center	–
18	November 24	@ Washington					Capital One Arena	–
19	November 27	Atlanta					TD Garden	–
20	November 29	@ San Antonio					Frost Bank Center	–
21	November 30	@ Dallas					American Airlines Center	–

December: 0–0 (home: 0–0; road: 0–0)

Game	Date	Team	Score	High points	High rebounds	High assists	Location Attendance	Record
22	December 2	Charlotte					TD Garden	–
23	TBD	TBD					TBD	–
24	TBD	TBD					TBD	–
25	December 13	@ Brooklyn					Barclays Center	–
26	December 14	Washington					TD Garden	–
27	December 16	Washington					TD Garden	–
28	December 18	Utah					TD Garden	–
29	December 20	Detroit					TD Garden	–
30	December 23	Portland					TD Garden	–
31	December 25	Miami					TD Garden	–
32	December 28	Cleveland					TD Garden	–
33	December 30	@ Chicago					United Center	–

January: 0–0 (home: 0–0; road: 0–0)

Game	Date	Team	Score	High points	High rebounds	High assists	Location Attendance	Record
34	January 1	@ Utah					Delta Center	–
35	January 2	@ Portland					Moda Center	–
36	January 4	@ Phoenix					Mortgage Matchup Center	–
37	January 7	@ L.A. Lakers					Crypto.com Arena	–
38	January 9	@ L.A. Clippers					Intuit Dome	–
39	January 11	Houston					TD Garden	–
40	January 13	New York					TD Garden	–
41	January 16	Brooklyn					TD Garden	–
42	January 18	@ Washington					Capital One Arena	–
43	January 20	Indiana					TD Garden	–
44	January 21	Philadelphia					TD Garden	–
45	January 23	Charlotte					TD Garden	–
46	January 25	Toronto					TD Garden	–
47	January 27	L.A. Clippers					TD Garden	–
48	January 29	Phoenix					TD Garden	–
49	January 31	@ Toronto					Scotiabank Arena	–

February: 0–0 (home: 0–0; road: 0–0)

Game	Date	Team	Score	High points	High rebounds	High assists	Location Attendance	Record
50	February 2	L.A. Lakers					TD Garden	–
51	February 4	@ Charlotte					Spectrum Center	–
52	February 5	@ Atlanta					State Farm Arena	–
53	February 7	@ Philadelphia					Xfinity Mobile Arena	–
54	February 9	Denver					TD Garden	–
55	February 10	Golden State					TD Garden	–
56	February 12	Minnesota					TD Garden	–
57	February 14	Toronto					TD Garden	–
58	February 17	@ Oklahoma City					Paycom Center	–
59	February 18	@ Memphis					FedExForum	–
All-Star Game
60	February 26	Cleveland					TD Garden	–
61	February 28	@ Minnesota					Target Center	–

March: 0–0 (home: 0–0; road: 0–0)

Game	Date	Team	Score	High points	High rebounds	High assists	Location Attendance	Record
62	March 2	@ Indiana					Gainbridge Fieldhouse	–
63	March 5	@ Detroit					Little Caesars Arena	–
64	March 7	Philadelphia					TD Garden	–
65	March 9	@ Chicago					United Center	–
66	March 11	Memphis					TD Garden	–
67	March 12	Oklahoma City					TD Garden	–
68	March 14	@ New York					Madison Square Garden	–
69	March 16	Sacramento					TD Garden	–
70	March 18	Orlando					TD Garden	–
71	March 21	New Orleans					TD Garden	–
72	March 23	@ Brooklyn					Barclays Center	–
73	March 24	San Antonio					TD Garden	–
74	March 27	@ Miami					Kaseya Center	–
75	March 28	@ New Orleans					Smoothie King Center	–
76	March 30	@ Indiana					Gainbridge Fieldhouse	–

April: 0–0 (home: 0–0; road: 0–0)

Game	Date	Team	Score	High points	High rebounds	High assists	Location Attendance	Record
77	April 1	@ Cleveland					Rocket Arena	–
78	April 2	Miami					TD Garden	–
79	April 4	@ New York					Madison Square Garden	–
80	April 7	@ Orlando					Kia Center	–
81	April 9	@ Atlanta					State Farm Arena	–
82	April 11	Milwaukee					TD Garden	–

2026–27 season schedule

== NBA Cup ==
=== East Group C ===
Pos	Team	Pld	W	L	PF	PA	PD	Qualification
1	Boston Celtics	2	2	0	244	191	+53	Advance to knockout stage
2	Atlanta Hawks	3	2	1	360	339	+21	Possible knockout stage based on ranking
3	Washington Wizards	3	2	1	325	312	+13	
4	Chicago Bulls	3	1	2	315	333	−18	
5	Charlotte Hornets	3	0	3	256	325	−69	

Updated to game(s) played on November 20, 2026. Source:

== Transactions ==
=== Trades ===
Date	Trade		Ref.
July 6, 2026	To Boston Celtics: Paul George; 2028 first-round pick (Note: Philadelphia owes its own pick to Brooklyn if its falls No. 9–30, and owns the Los Angeles Clippers pick outright. The San Antonio Spurs have the right to swap its own pick with Boston if Boston's pick falls No. 2–30. Boston may swap for the most favorable (or only) pick Philadelphia holds unless the Philadelphia pick falls No. 9–30 AND the Clippers pick falls No. 17–30, in which case Boston would receive the Clippers pick outright and make no swap with Philadelphia.); 2028 second-round pick (Note: The most favorable of the picks originally belonging to Golden State Warriors, Milwaukee Bucks, and Oklahoma City Thunder.); 2030 second-round pick (Note: The most favorable of the picks originally belonging to Phoenix Suns, Portland Trail Blazers, and Washington Wizards.); 2031 PHI first-round pick	To Philadelphia 76ers: Jaylen Brown	

=== Free agency ===
==== Re-signed ====
Date	Player	Ref.
July 6, 2026	Ron Harper Jr.	

==== Additions ====
Date	Player	Former Team	Ref.
July 6, 2026	Mitchell Robinson	New York Knicks	
July 6, 2026	Mike Conley	Minnesota Timberwolves	

==== Subtractions ====
Player	Reason	New Team	Ref.
Nikola Vučević	Free agency	Orlando Magic	
