= 2026 NBA Cup =

Basketball tournament

Tournament information
- Location: Local NBA cities (group stage, quarterfinals and semifinals); Indianapolis (championship game)
- Date: October 30 – December 11, 2026
- Venues: Local NBA arenas (group stage, quarterfinals and semifinals); Hinkle Fieldhouse (championship game)
- Teams: 30
- Purse: See prize money

The 2026 NBA Cup (known as the Emirates NBA Cup for sponsorship reasons) is an ongoing multi-stage basketball tournament that is being played during the 2026–27 NBA season. It is the fourth edition of the NBA Cup. All 30 teams participate, each playing four regular season games that count towards the tournament's group stage standings. All games in the knockout round, except for the championship game, also count towards the regular season standings. The tournament's championship game will be played at Hinkle Fieldhouse in Indianapolis, Indiana.

The New York Knicks are the defending champions.

== Format ==
The tournament's format was similar to in-season, multi-stage tournaments in European soccer. In the group stage, each conference was divided into three groups with five teams each, for a total of six groups. Regular season games played on Tuesdays and Fridays between October 30 and November 27 counted in the regular season standings and the NBA Cup standings. Each team played one game against each of the other teams in its group, for a total of four games (two at home and two on the road).

If two or more teams in a group had equal records upon completion of group play, the following tiebreakers were applied in this order:

1. Head-to-head record in the group stage
2. Point differential in the group stage (excluding overtime)
3. Total points scored in the group stage (excluding overtime)
4. Regular season record from the 2024–25 regular season
5. Random drawing

Note: Overtime scoring did not count towards the point differential and total points tiebreakers in the Emirates NBA Cup. A team's point differential was "0" in Group Play games that went to overtime, and a team's total points scored excluded points scored in overtime.

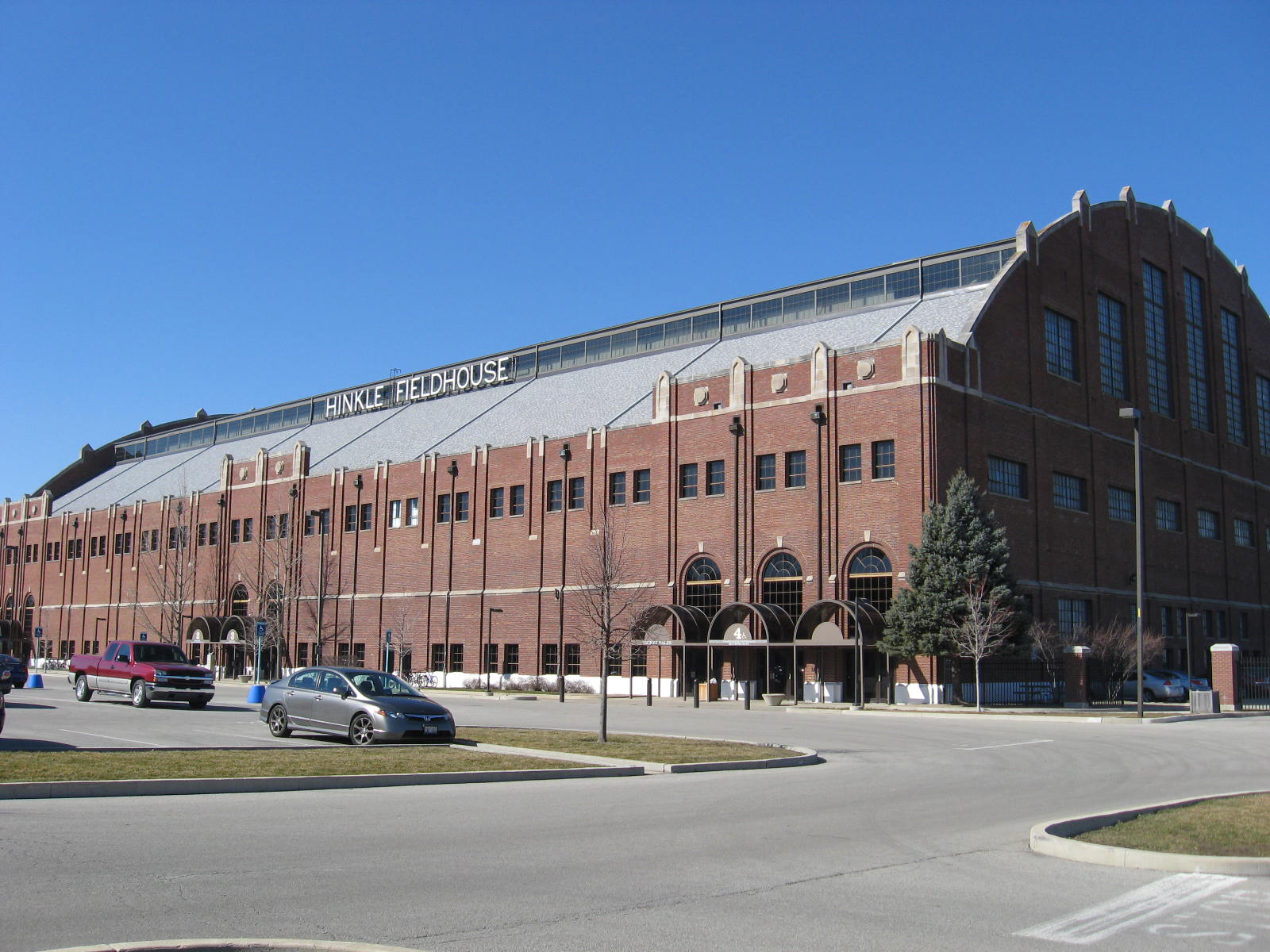
Hinkle Fieldhouse in 2012

Each group's winner then advanced to the knockout stage, as did one wild card from each conference—the group runner-up with the best group stage record. The knockout stage was a single-elimination tournament. Quarterfinal games will be played in local NBA markets on December 4 and 5, with the teams with the top two group stage records in each conference hosting, and the best team in group-play games would host the wild-card team.

Starting this season, the semifinals on December 8 and 9 will also be played at the home arenas of each conference's higher-seed instead of a neutral site. The championship game will then be played on December 11 at Hinkle Fieldhouse in Indianapolis, Indiana, under the NBA's new plan to hold the final round at iconic basketball arenas.

Quarterfinal and semifinal games counted as regular season games, affecting teams' positions in league standings, but the championship game did not. Statistics from the championship game were also not counted in regular season totals.

To balance the regular season, the teams that did not make the knockout stage played two additional consolation games on December 6 or 7 and 9 or 10, against each other in the same conference, while teams that were eliminated in the quarterfinals played one additional consolation game against each other (from the same conference) on December 7, 9 or 10.

While the knockout stage was played, the 22 teams that did not qualify for the knockout stage each will play two additional regular season games, one home and one away, to complete each team's 82 game regular season schedule. Among these 11 total matchups, 10 are intra-conference games, with an attempt by the league to schedule as many pairs of teams that were originally scheduled to only play each other three times during the regular season. The other two matchups are interconference games, as there is an odd number of teams in each conference (11). This final interconference matchups featured two of the six teams that finished last in their respective group.

=== Prize money ===
Players on teams advancing to the knockout stage received prize money as follows:

- Players on teams that lose in the quarterfinals: $51,497 each
- Players on teams that lose in the semifinals: $102,994 each
- Players on the tournament runner-up team: $205,988 each
- Players on the tournament championship team: $514,971 each

Each group's winner will advance to the knockout stage, along with one wild card from each conference. Quarterfinals (December 4–5) and semifinals (December 8/9) will be played in local markets, while the championship game (December 11) will take place in Indianapolis.

== Draw ==
=== Pots ===
Teams were allocated into five pots per conference based on the 2025–26 regular season standings. Pot 1 contained the teams with the top three regular season records in each conference, while Pot 2 contained the teams with the fourth- to sixth-best records and so forth, concluding with Pot 5, which contained the teams with the bottom three (thirteenth through fifteenth) records.

Eastern Conference
Pot	#	Team	Record	
Pot	#	Team	W	L
1	1	Detroit Pistons	60	22
1	2	Boston Celtics	56	26
1	3	New York Knicks	53	29
2	4	Cleveland Cavaliers	52	30
2	5	Toronto Raptors	46	36
2	6	Atlanta Hawks	46	36
3	7	Philadelphia 76ers	45	37
3	8	Orlando Magic	45	37
3	9	Charlotte Hornets	44	38
4	10	Miami Heat	43	39
4	11	Milwaukee Bucks	32	50
4	12	Chicago Bulls	31	51
5	13	Brooklyn Nets	20	62
5	14	Indiana Pacers	19	63
5	15	Washington Wizards	17	65

Western Conference
Pot	#	Team	Record	
Pot	#	Team	W	L
1	1	Oklahoma City Thunder	64	18
1	2	San Antonio Spurs	62	20
1	3	Denver Nuggets	54	28
2	4	Los Angeles Lakers	53	29
2	5	Houston Rockets	52	30
2	6	Minnesota Timberwolves	49	33
3	7	Phoenix Suns	45	37
3	8	Portland Trail Blazers	42	40
3	9	Los Angeles Clippers	42	40
4	10	Golden State Warriors	37	45
4	11	New Orleans Pelicans	26	56
4	12	Dallas Mavericks	26	56
5	13	Memphis Grizzlies	25	57
5	14	Sacramento Kings	22	60
5	15	Utah Jazz	22	60

=== Draw results ===
The groups were revealed on June 30, 2026.

Eastern Conference
Group A	Group B	Group C
Detroit Pistons (1); Toronto Raptors (5); Orlando Magic (8); Milwaukee Bucks (11); Brooklyn Nets (13)	New York Knicks (3); Cleveland Cavaliers (4); Philadelphia 76ers (7); Miami Heat (10); Indiana Pacers (14)	Boston Celtics (2); Atlanta Hawks (6); Charlotte Hornets (9); Chicago Bulls (12); Washington Wizards (15)

Western Conference
Group A	Group B	Group C
Denver Nuggets (3); Houston Rockets (5); Phoenix Suns (7); Dallas Mavericks (12); Utah Jazz (15)	Oklahoma City Thunder (1); Minnesota Timberwolves (6); Los Angeles Clippers (9); New Orleans Pelicans (11); Memphis Grizzlies (13)	San Antonio Spurs (2); Los Angeles Lakers (4); Portland Trail Blazers (8); Golden State Warriors (10); Sacramento Kings (14)

== Group stage ==
=== East group A ===
Pos	Team	Pld	W	L	PF	PA	PD	Qualification
1	Orlando Magic	3	3	0	341	324	+17	Advance to knockout stage
2	Toronto Raptors	3	2	1	340	330	+10	Possible knockout stage based on ranking
3	Detroit Pistons	2	1	1	212	199	+13	
4	Brooklyn Nets	2	0	2	205	223	−18	
5	Milwaukee Bucks	2	0	2	206	228	−22	

Updated to game(s) played on November 20, 2026. Source:

Games

Note: Times are Eastern Time (UTC−4 or UTC−5) as listed by the NBA. If the venue is located in a different time zone, the local time is also given.

NBA League Pass

October 30
7:30 p.m.

Recap

Detroit Pistons 110, Brooklyn Nets 94
Scoring by quarter: 21–28, 35–21, 36–17, 18–28
Pts: Cade Cunningham (20); Rebs: John Collins (9); Asts: Ausar Thompson (6)	Pts: Moritz Wagner (16); Rebs: Clowney, Randle, Wagner (8); Asts: Mikel Brown Jr. (4)

Barclays Center, Brooklyn, NY
Attendance: 17,548
Referees: Marc Davis, Ed Malloy, Biniam Maru

NBA League Pass

October 30
7:30 p.m.

Recap

Orlando Magic 121, Toronto Raptors 114
Scoring by quarter: 31–27, 33–28, 31–33, 26–26
Pts: Desmond Bane (28); Rebs: Wendell Carter Jr. (7); Asts: Franz Wagner (11)	Pts: Scottie Barnes (41); Rebs: Jakob Poeltl (11); Asts: Quickley, Shead (8)

Scotiabank Arena, Toronto, ON
Attendance: 19,364
Referees: Sean Wright, Mitchell Ervin, Tyler Ricks

NBA League Pass

November 6
8:00 p.m. (7:00 p.m. Central)

Recap

Toronto Raptors 121, Milwaukee Bucks 107
Scoring by quarter: 24–29, 27–31, 38–27, 32–20
Pts: RJ Barrett (27); Rebs: Jakob Poeltl (11); Asts: Jamal Shead (16)	Pts: Tyler Herro (23); Rebs: Brayden Burries (11); Asts: Tyler Herro (10)

Fiserv Forum, Milwaukee, WI
Attendance: 14,057
Referees: Scott Foster, Mousa Dagher, Leon Wood

NBA League Pass

November 13
7:00 p.m.

Recap

Milwaukee Bucks 99, Orlando Magic 107
Scoring by quarter: 15–23, 22–29, 35–32, 27–23
Pts: Jaime Jaquez Jr. (22); Rebs: Myles Turner (11); Asts: Jaime Jaquez Jr. (4)	Pts: Franz Wagner (35); Rebs: Franz Wagner (9); Asts: Franz Wagner (12)

Kia Center, Orlando, FL
Attendance: 19,140
Referees: Mitchell Ervin, Jacyn Goble, Phenizee Ransom

NBA League Pass

November 20
7:30 p.m.

Recap

Orlando Magic 113, Brooklyn Nets 111
Scoring by quarter: 38–25, 24–36, 29–27, 22–23
Pts: Franz Wagner (35); Rebs: Carter Jr., Vučević (8); Asts: Franz Wagner (7)	Pts: Julius Randle (27); Rebs: Day'Ron Sharpe (11); Asts: Julius Randle (6)

Barclays Center, Brooklyn, NY
Attendance: 17,067
Referees: Bill Kennedy, Mark Lindsay, Sha'Rae Mitchell

Prime Video

November 20
7:30 p.m.

Recap

Toronto Raptors 105, Detroit Pistons 102
Scoring by quarter: 26–23, 28–25, 23–24, 28–30
Pts: Scottie Barnes (29); Rebs: Allen Graves (10); Asts: Immanuel Quickley (11)	Pts: Cade Cunningham (23); Rebs: Collins, Thompson (6); Asts: Cade Cunningham (9)

Little Caesars Arena, Detroit, MI
Attendance: 20,178
Referees: James Williams, JB DeRosa, Dedric Taylor

TBD

November 24
7:00 p.m.

Detroit Pistons vs. Orlando Magic

Kia Center, Orlando, FL

NBA League Pass

November 25
8:00 p.m. (7:00 p.m. Central)

Brooklyn Nets vs. Milwaukee Bucks

Fiserv Forum, Milwaukee, WI

NBA League Pass

November 27
7:30 p.m.

Milwaukee Bucks vs. Detroit Pistons

Little Caesars Arena, Detroit, MI

NBA League Pass

November 27
7:30 p.m.

Brooklyn Nets vs. Toronto Raptors

Scotiabank Arena, Toronto, ON

=== East group B ===
Pos	Team	Pld	W	L	PF	PA	PD	Qualification
1	Miami Heat	2	2	0	278	246	+32	Advance to knockout stage
2	Cleveland Cavaliers	3	2	1	368	347	+21	Possible knockout stage based on ranking
3	Philadelphia 76ers	2	1	1	193	212	−19	
4	Indiana Pacers	3	1	2	350	377	−27	
5	New York Knicks	2	0	2	197	204	−7	

Updated to game(s) played on November 20, 2026. Source:

Games

Note: Times are Eastern Time (UTC−4 or UTC−5) as listed by the NBA. If the venue is located in a different time zone, the local time is also given.

Prime Video

October 30
7:30 p.m.

Recap

New York Knicks 93, Philadelphia 76ers 98
Scoring by quarter: 21–29, 23–24, 24–24, 25–21
Pts: Jalen Brunson (24); Rebs: Karl-Anthony Towns (12); Asts: Jalen Brunson (6)	Pts: Tyrese Maxey (27); Rebs: LeBron James (9); Asts: LeBron James (8)

Xfinity Mobile Arena, Philadelphia, PA
Attendance: 21,196
Referees: Kevin Scott, Bill Kennedy, Simone Jelks

NBA League Pass

October 30
8:00 p.m.

Recap

Indiana Pacers 125, Miami Heat 145
Scoring by quarter: 42–36, 19–32, 27–35, –
Pts: Quenton Jackson (24); Rebs: Brown, Walker (6); Asts: Andrew Nembhard (9)	Pts: Giannis Antetokounmpo (31); Rebs: Giannis Antetokounmpo (17); Asts: Davion Mitchell (11)

Kaseya Center, Miami, FL
Attendance: 19,653
Referees: Brent Barnaky, Eric Lewis, Brett Nansel

Prime Video

November 6
7:30 p.m.

Recap

Philadelphia 76ers 95, Cleveland Cavaliers 119
Scoring by quarter: 22–33, 32–29, 20–29, 21–28
Pts: Jaylen Brown (20); Rebs: Embiid, James (7); Asts: Jaylen Brown (5)	Pts: Donovan Mitchell (23); Rebs: Mario Hezonja (10); Asts: Donovan Mitchell (8)

Rocket Arena, Cleveland, OH
Attendance: 19,432
Referees: Kevin Scott, JB DeRosa, Pat O'Connell

Prime Video

November 13
7:00 p.m.

Recap

New York Knicks 104, Indiana Pacers 106
Scoring by quarter: 27–26, 22–32, 35–27, 20–21
Pts: Jalen Brunson (33); Rebs: Karl-Anthony Towns (15); Asts: Jalen Brunson (11)	Pts: Pascal Siakam (19); Rebs: Ivica Zubac (13); Asts: T.J. McConnell (7)

Gainbridge Fieldhouse, Indianapolis, IN
Attendance: 17,274
Referees: Justin Van Duyne, Ed Malloy, Intae Hwang

NBA League Pass

November 13
8:00 p.m.

Recap

Cleveland Cavaliers 121, Miami Heat 133
Scoring by quarter: 27–29, 30–25, 34–38, 30–41
Pts: Donovan Mitchell (25); Rebs: Donovan Mitchell (8); Asts: James Harden (8)	Pts: Adebayo, Antetokounmpo (37); Rebs: Bam Adebayo (14); Asts: Davion Mitchell (17)

Kaseya Center, Miami, FL
Attendance: 19,646
Referees: John Goble, Mark Lindsay, JD Ralls

NBA League Pass

November 20
7:30 p.m.

Recap

Indiana Pacers 119, Cleveland Cavaliers 128
Scoring by quarter: 29–29, 32–33, 22–43, 36–23
Pts: Siakam, Zubac (21); Rebs: Nesmith, Zubac (10); Asts: Andrew Nembhard (8)	Pts: James Harden (51); Rebs: Mario Hezonja (10); Asts: James Harden (6)

Rocket Arena, Cleveland, OH
Attendance: 19,432
Referees: Sean Wright, Nick Buchert, Tyler Ricks

ESPN

November 25
5:00 p.m.

Miami Heat vs. Philadelphia 76ers

Xfinity Mobile Arena, Philadelphia, PA

NBA League Pass

November 25
7:30 p.m.

Cleveland Cavaliers vs. New York Knicks

Madison Square Garden, New York, NY

Prime Video

November 27
7:00 p.m.

Miami Heat vs. New York Knicks

Madison Square Garden, New York, NY

NBA League Pass

November 27
7:30 p.m.

Philadelphia 76ers vs. Indiana Pacers

Gainbridge Fieldhouse, Indianapolis, IN

=== East group C ===
Pos	Team	Pld	W	L	PF	PA	PD	Qualification
1	Boston Celtics	2	2	0	244	191	+53	Advance to knockout stage
2	Atlanta Hawks	3	2	1	360	339	+21	Possible knockout stage based on ranking
3	Washington Wizards	3	2	1	325	312	+13	
4	Chicago Bulls	3	1	2	315	333	−18	
5	Charlotte Hornets	3	0	3	256	325	−69	

Updated to game(s) played on November 20, 2026. Source:

Games

Note: Times are Eastern Time (UTC−4 or UTC−5) as listed by the NBA. If the venue is located in a different time zone, the local time is also given.

NBA League Pass

October 30
7:00 p.m.

Recap

Charlotte Hornets 79, Washington Wizards 95
Scoring by quarter: 26–22, 20–29, 13–28, 20–16
Pts: Brandon Miller (19); Rebs: Moussa Diabaté (12); Asts: Dennis Schröder (8)	Pts: Anthony Davis (25); Rebs: Anthony Davis (13); Asts: Trae Young (9)

Capital One Arena, Washington, DC
Attendance: 17,566
Referees: James Capers, Sean Corbin, Brandon Schwab

NBA League Pass

October 30
7:30 p.m.

Recap

Chicago Bulls 111, Boston Celtics 125
Scoring by quarter: 25–44, 24–34, 25–21, 37–26
Pts: Caleb Wilson (23); Rebs: Jalen Smith (12); Asts: Josh Giddey (5)	Pts: Payton Pritchard (30); Rebs: Jayson Tatum (7); Asts: Paul George (8)

TD Garden, Boston, MA
Attendance: 19,156
Referees: Pat Fraher, Nate Green, Scott Twardoski

NBA League Pass

November 6
7:00 p.m.

Recap

Washington Wizards 132, Atlanta Hawks 139
Scoring by quarter: 32–28, 27–38, 35–39, 38–34
Pts: Kyshawn George (33); Rebs: Deandre Ayton (11); Asts: Trae Young (10)	Pts: Nickeil Alexander-Walker (28); Rebs: Onyeka Okongwu (10); Asts: Dyson Daniels (12)

State Farm Arena, Atlanta, GA
Attendance: 15,538
Referees: Ray Acosta, John Butler, Phenizee Ransom

NBA League Pass

November 6
7:00 p.m.

Recap

Boston Celtics 119, Charlotte Hornets 80
Scoring by quarter: 40–20, 30–19, 26–18, 23–23
Pts: Jayson Tatum (34); Rebs: Jayson Tatum (8); Asts: Jayson Tatum (9)	Pts: Naz Reid (14); Rebs: Hannes Steinbach (11); Asts: Christian Anderson (5)

Spectrum Center, Charlotte, NC
Attendance: 19,586
Referees: Tony Brothers, Marat Kogut, Brent Haskill

NBA League Pass

November 13
8:00 p.m. (7:00 p.m. Central)

Recap

Atlanta Hawks 117, Chicago Bulls 125 (OT)
Scoring by quarter: 24–33, 29–27, 30–24, 27–26, Overtime: 7–15
Pts: Jalen Johnson (27); Rebs: Jalen Johnson (11); Asts: Jalen Johnson (10)	Pts: Norman Powell (33); Rebs: Jalen Smith (12); Asts: Josh Giddey (14)

United Center, Chicago, IL
Attendance: 19,466
Referees: Tony Brothers, Bill Kennedy, J.T. Orr

NBA League Pass

November 20
7:00 p.m.

Recap

Charlotte Hornets 97, Atlanta Hawks 111
Scoring by quarter: 31–23, 26–33, 19–31, 21–24
Pts: Moussa Diabaté (21); Rebs: Moussa Diabaté (15); Asts: Coby White (9)	Pts: Jalen Johnson (26); Rebs: Dyson Daniels (8); Asts: Dyson Daniels (10)

State Farm Arena, Atlanta, GA
Attendance: 15,488
Referees: Josh Tiven, Jacyn Goble, Leon Wood

NBA League Pass

November 20
8:00 p.m. (7:00 p.m. Central)

Recap

Washington Wizards 98, Chicago Bulls 94
Scoring by quarter: 22–29, 30–31, 23–9, 23–25
Pts: Anthony Davis (36); Rebs: Anthony Davis (11); Asts: AJ Dybantsa (6)	Pts: Norman Powell (16); Rebs: Claxton, Okoro (7); Asts: Josh Giddey (7)

United Center, Chicago, IL
Referees: James Capers, Eric Lewis, Derrick Collins

NBC

November 24
8:00 p.m.

Boston Celtics vs. Washington Wizards

Capital One Arena, Washington, DC

NBA League Pass

November 25
7:00 p.m.

Chicago Bulls vs. Charlotte Hornets

Spectrum Center, Charlotte, NC

NBA League Pass

November 27
8:00 p.m.

Atlanta Hawks vs. Boston Celtics

TD Garden, Boston, MA

=== West group A ===
Pos	Team	Pld	W	L	PF	PA	PD	Qualification
1	Dallas Mavericks	2	2	0	228	211	+17	Advance to knockout stage
2	Denver Nuggets	2	2	0	260	244	+16	Possible knockout stage based on ranking
3	Phoenix Suns	2	1	1	231	228	+3	
4	Houston Rockets	3	1	2	360	367	−7	
5	Utah Jazz	3	0	3	319	348	−29	

Updated to game(s) played on November 20, 2026. Source:

Games

Note: Times are Eastern Time (UTC−4 or UTC−5) as listed by the NBA. If the venue is located in a different time zone, the local time is also given.

NBA League Pass

October 30
8:00 p.m. (7:00 p.m. Central)

Recap

Houston Rockets 111, Dallas Mavericks 116
Scoring by quarter: 20–27, 31–17, 33–32, 27–40
Pts: Kevin Durant (28); Rebs: Marcus Smart (13); Asts: Thompson, VanVleet (6)	Pts: Kyrie Irving (35); Rebs: P.J. Washington (10); Asts: Kyrie Irving (9)

American Airlines Center, Dallas, TX
Attendance: 18,832
Referees: Zach Zarba, Ashley Moyer-Gleich, Robert Hussey

NBA League Pass

October 30
10:00 p.m. (8:00 p.m. Mountain)

Recap

Denver Nuggets 127, Phoenix Suns 120
Scoring by quarter: 32–37, 39–30, 32–26, 24–27
Pts: Jamal Murray (39); Rebs: Cameron Johnson (10); Asts: Nikola Jokić (10)	Pts: Miles Bridges (24); Rebs: Miles Bridges (10); Asts: Collin Gillespie (10)

Mortgage Matchup Center, Phoenix, AZ
Attendance: 17,071
Referees: Tyler Ford, Brian Forte, Mousa Dagher

NBA League Pass

November 6
8:00 p.m. (7:00 p.m. Central)

Recap

Utah Jazz 100, Dallas Mavericks 112
Scoring by quarter: 28–26, 29–31, 19–32, 24–23
Pts: Lauri Markkanen (24); Rebs: Lauri Markkanen (8); Asts: Keyonte George (9)	Pts: P.J. Washington (26); Rebs: Morez Johnson Jr. (17); Asts: Cooper Flagg (7)

American Airlines Center, Dallas, TX
Attendance: 19,568
Referees: Tyler Ford, Nick Buchert, Che Flores

NBA League Pass

November 13
8:30 p.m. (7:30 p.m. Central)

Recap

Utah Jazz 118, Houston Rockets 125
Scoring by quarter: 27–27, 26–36, 36–29, 29–33
Pts: Darryn Peterson (28); Rebs: Mo Bamba (8); Asts: Keyonte George (7)	Pts: Alperen Sengun (43); Rebs: Alperen Sengun (12); Asts: Kevin Durant (6)

Toyota Center, Houston, TX
Attendance: 18,055
Referees: Sean Wright, Kevin Cutler, Jenna Reneau

NBA League Pass

November 20
9:30 p.m. (7:30 p.m. Mountain)

Recap

Phoenix Suns 111, Utah Jazz 101
Scoring by quarter: 26–23, 35–26, 28–27, 22–25
Pts: Devin Booker (23); Rebs: Bridges, Goodwin (9); Asts: Bridges, Goodwin (4)	Pts: Darryn Peterson (20); Rebs: Jaxson Hayes (14); Asts: Darryn Peterson (8)

Delta Center, Salt Lake City, UT
Attendance: 17,867
Referees: Tyler Ford, Brent Barnaky, Che Flores

Prime Video

November 20
10:00 p.m. (8:00 p.m. Mountain)

Recap

Houston Rockets 124, Denver Nuggets 133
Scoring by quarter: 33–31, 27–31, 42–37, 22–34
Pts: Alperen Sengun (28); Rebs: Alperen Sengun (11); Asts: Alperen Sengun (10)	Pts: Nikola Jokić (26); Rebs: Nikola Jokić (7); Asts: Nikola Jokić (11)

Ball Arena, Denver, CO
Referees: Zach Zarba, Karl Lane, Dannica Baroody

NBC

November 24
10:00 p.m. (8:00 p.m. Mountain)

Dallas Mavericks vs. Denver Nuggets

Ball Arena, Denver, CO

NBA League Pass

November 25
8:30 p.m. (7:30 p.m. Central)

Phoenix Suns vs. Houston Rockets

Toyota Center, Houston, TX

NBA League Pass

November 27
9:00 p.m. (7:00 p.m. Mountain)

Dallas Mavericks vs. Phoenix Suns

Mortgage Matchup Center, Phoenix, AZ

NBA League Pass

November 27
9:30 p.m. (7:30 p.m. Mountain)

Denver Nuggets vs. Utah Jazz

Delta Center, Salt Lake City, UT

=== West group B ===
Pos	Team	Pld	W	L	PF	PA	PD	Qualification
1	Minnesota Timberwolves	2	2	0	242	210	+32	Advance to knockout stage
2	Oklahoma City Thunder	3	2	1	366	330	+36	Possible knockout stage based on ranking
3	Memphis Grizzlies	2	1	1	239	239	0	
4	Los Angeles Clippers	2	1	1	214	239	−25	
5	New Orleans Pelicans	3	0	3	340	383	−43	

Updated to game(s) played on November 20, 2026. Source:

Games

Note: Times are Eastern Time (UTC−4 or UTC−5) as listed by the NBA. If the venue is located in a different time zone, the local time is also given.

NBA League Pass

October 30
8:00 p.m. (7:00 p.m. Central)

Recap

Los Angeles Clippers 101, Minnesota Timberwolves 127
Scoring by quarter: 24–34, 32–35, 25–29, 20–29
Pts: Darius Garland (24); Rebs: Isaiah Jackson (7); Asts: Kris Dunn (7)	Pts: LaMelo Ball (24); Rebs: Rudy Gobert (13); Asts: Bones Hyland (8)

Target Center, Minneapolis, MN
Attendance: 17,593
Referees: JB DeRosa, Marat Kogut, Che Flores

NBA League Pass

November 6
8:00 p.m. (7:00 p.m. Central)

Recap

Oklahoma City Thunder 128, Memphis Grizzlies 97
Scoring by quarter: 35–28, 36–21, 27–27, 30–21
Pts: Ajay Mitchell (35); Rebs: Aday Mara (7); Asts: Isaiah Hartenstein (7)	Pts: Ty Jerome (21); Rebs: Cameron Boozer (12); Asts: Ty Jerome (5)

FedEx Forum, Memphis, TN
Attendance: 16,197
Referees: Justin Van Duyne, Brent Barnaky, Brett Nansel

NBA League Pass

November 6
8:00 p.m. (7:00 p.m. Central)

Recap

Minnesota Timberwolves 115, New Orleans Pelicans 109
Scoring by quarter: 27–30, 30–21, 20–28, 38–30
Pts: Ayo Dosunmu (26); Rebs: Trey Lyles (13); Asts: LaMelo Ball (8)	Pts: Jeremiah Fears (24); Rebs: Zion Williamson (8); Asts: Fears, Murphy III (5)

Smoothie King Center, New Orleans, LA
Attendance: 17,767
Referees: James Williams, Aaron Smith, Simone Jelks

NBA League Pass

November 13
8:00 p.m. (7:00 p.m. Central)

Recap

Memphis Grizzlies 142, New Orleans Pelicans 111
Scoring by quarter: 35–28, 35–30, 35–28, 37–25
Pts: Jerami Grant (22); Rebs: Taylor Hendricks (12); Asts: Ty Jerome (9)	Pts: Saddiq Bey (30); Rebs: Saddiq Bey (10); Asts: Jeremiah Fears (7)

Smoothie King Center, New Orleans, LA
Attendance: 16,487
Referees: Curtis Blair, Brent Barnaky, CJ Washington

NBA League Pass

November 13
10:30 p.m. (7:30 p.m. Pacific)

Recap

Oklahoma City Thunder 112, Los Angeles Clippers 113
Scoring by quarter: 27–33, 17–24, 40–25, 28–31
Pts: Shai Gilgeous-Alexander (40); Rebs: Isaiah Hartenstein (16); Asts: Isaiah Hartenstein (6)	Pts: Brook Lopez (26); Rebs: Rui Hachimura (11); Asts: Darius Garland (7)

Intuit Dome, Inglewood, CA
Attendance: 17,927
Referees: Scott Foster, Natalie Sago, Brandon Adair

NBA League Pass

November 20
8:00 p.m. (7:00 p.m. Central)

Recap

New Orleans Pelicans 120, Oklahoma City Thunder 126
Scoring by quarter: 36–33, 28–23, 34–36, 22–34
Pts: Fears, Williamson (22); Rebs: Fears, Missi, Queen (7); Asts: Zion Williamson (7)	Pts: Shai Gilgeous-Alexander (40); Rebs: Aday Mara (16); Asts: Shai Gilgeous-Alexander (7)

Paycom Center, Oklahoma City, OK
Attendance: 18,203
Referees: Ed Malloy, Andy Nagy, Intae Hwang

ESPN

November 25
7:30 p.m. (6:30 p.m. Central)

Minnesota Timberwolves vs. Oklahoma City Thunder

Paycom Center, Oklahoma City, OK

NBA League Pass

November 25
8:00 p.m. (7:00 p.m. Central)

Los Angeles Clippers vs. Memphis Grizzlies

FedEx Forum, Memphis, TN

NBA League Pass

November 27
8:30 p.m. (7:30 p.m. Central)

Memphis Grizzlies vs. Minnesota Timberwolves

Target Center, Minneapolis, MN

NBA League Pass

November 27
9:30 p.m. (6:30 p.m. Pacific)

New Orleans Pelicans vs. Los Angeles Clippers

Intuit Dome, Inglewood, CA

=== West group C ===
Pos	Team	Pld	W	L	PF	PA	PD	Qualification
1	San Antonio Spurs	2	2	0	247	194	+53	Advance to knockout stage
2	Los Angeles Lakers	3	2	1	325	334	−9	Possible knockout stage based on ranking
3	Portland Trail Blazers	2	1	1	238	231	+7	
4	Golden State Warriors	2	1	1	197	218	−21	
5	Sacramento Kings	3	0	3	320	350	−30	

Updated to game(s) played on November 20, 2026. Source:

Games

Note: Times are Eastern Time (UTC−4 or UTC−5) as listed by the NBA. If the venue is located in a different time zone, the local time is also given.

Prime Video

October 30
10:00 p.m. (7:00 p.m. Pacific)

Recap

Los Angeles Lakers 95, Golden State Warriors 112
Scoring by quarter: 38–15, 15–38, 27–32, 15–27
Pts: Luka Dončić (37); Rebs: Walker Kessler (13); Asts: Dončić, Reaves (5)	Pts: Stephen Curry (31); Rebs: Melton, Niang, Podziemski, Santos (5); Asts: Draymond Green (9)

Chase Center, San Francisco, CA
Attendance: 18,064
Referees: Tony Brothers, John Butler, Jenna Schroeder

Prime Video

November 6
10:00 p.m. (7:00 p.m. Pacific)

Recap

Portland Trail Blazers 118, Los Angeles Lakers 124
Scoring by quarter: 29–20, 31–33, 15–34, 43–37
Pts: Avdija, Lillard (22); Rebs: Donovan Clingan (11); Asts: Deni Avdija (11)	Pts: Luka Dončić (53); Rebs: Walker Kessler (12); Asts: Luka Dončić (5)

Crypto.com Arena, Los Angeles, CA
Attendance: 19,057
Referees: Sean Wright, Sean Corbin, J.T. Orr

NBA League Pass

November 6
10:00 p.m. (7:00 p.m. Pacific)

Recap

San Antonio Spurs 124, Sacramento Kings 109
Scoring by quarter: 38–29, 37–27, 24–24, 25–29
Pts: Victor Wembanyama (30); Rebs: Victor Wembanyama (14); Asts: Stephon Castle (7)	Pts: Darius Acuff Jr. (22); Rebs: Domantas Sabonis (12); Asts: Darius Acuff Jr. (8)

Golden 1 Center, Sacramento, CA
Attendance: 14,238
Referees: Jacyn Goble, Nate Green, Robert Hussey

Prime Video

November 13
9:30 p.m. (8:30 p.m. Central)

Recap

Golden State Warriors 85, San Antonio Spurs 123
Scoring by quarter: 14–38, 19–25, 27–34, 25–26
Pts: LJ Cryer (20); Rebs: Yaxel Lendeborg (7); Asts: LJ Cryer (6)	Pts: Stephon Castle (32); Rebs: Victor Wembanyama (12); Asts: Castle, Wembanyama (6)

Frost Bank Center, San Antonio, TX
Attendance: 18,849
Referees: Eric Dalen, James Williams, Evan Scott

NBA League Pass

November 13
10:00 p.m. (7:00 p.m. Pacific)

Recap

Portland Trail Blazers 120, Sacramento Kings 107
Scoring by quarter: 34–25, 30–28, 29–25, 27–29
Pts: Deni Avdija (34); Rebs: Donovan Clingan (11); Asts: Damian Lillard (6)	Pts: De'Andre Hunter (24); Rebs: Domantas Sabonis (12); Asts: Acuff Jr., LaVine (6)

Golden 1 Center, Sacramento, CA
Attendance: 14,831
Referees: Marc Davis, Andy Nagy, Biniam Maru

NBA League Pass

November 20
10:00 p.m. (7:00 p.m. Pacific)

Recap

Sacramento Kings 104, Los Angeles Lakers 106
Scoring by quarter: 28–28, 34–26, 22–28, 20–24
Pts: De'Andre Hunter (30); Rebs: Domantas Sabonis (16); Asts: Darius Acuff Jr. (12)	Pts: Luka Dončić (25); Rebs: Sandro Mamukelashvili (9); Asts: Luka Dončić (8)

Crypto.com Arena, Los Angeles, CA
Attendance: 19,057
Referees: John Goble, Ashley Moyer-Gleich, Robert Hussey

NBA League Pass

November 25
10:00 p.m. (7:00 p.m. Pacific)

Sacramento Kings vs. Golden State Warriors

Chase Center, San Francisco, CA

ESPN

November 25
10:00 p.m. (7:00 p.m. Pacific)

San Antonio Spurs vs. Portland Trail Blazers

Moda Center, Portland, OR

Prime Video

November 27
9:30 p.m. (8:30 p.m. Central)

Los Angeles Lakers vs. San Antonio Spurs

Frost Bank Center, San Antonio, TX

NBA League Pass

November 27
9:30 p.m. (6:30 p.m. Pacific)

Golden State Warriors vs. Portland Trail Blazers

Moda Center, Portland, OR

== Ranking of second-placed teams ==
=== Eastern Conference ===
Pos	Team	Pld	W	L	PF	PA	PD	Qualification
1	Cleveland Cavaliers	3	2	1	368	347	+21	Advance to knockout stage
2	Atlanta Hawks	3	2	1	360	339	+21	
3	Toronto Raptors	3	2	1	340	330	+10	

Updated to game(s) played on November 20, 2026. Source:

=== Western Conference ===
Pos	Team	Pld	W	L	PF	PA	PD	Qualification
1	Denver Nuggets	2	2	0	260	244	+16	Advance to knockout stage
2	Oklahoma City Thunder	3	2	1	366	330	+36	
3	Los Angeles Lakers	3	2	1	325	334	−9	

Updated to game(s) played on November 20, 2026. Source:

== Knockout stage ==
Note: Teams to be determined after group play.

=== Qualified teams ===
Eastern Conference

Pos	Team	Pld	W	L	PF	PA	PD
1	Orlando Magic	3	3	0	341	324	+17
2	Boston Celtics	2	2	0	244	191	+53
3	Miami Heat	2	2	0	278	246	+32
4	Cleveland Cavaliers	3	2	1	368	347	+21

Updated to match(es) played on November 20, 2026. Source:
Rules for classification: Tiebreakers

Western Conference

Pos	Team	Pld	W	L	PF	PA	PD
1	San Antonio Spurs	2	2	0	247	194	+53
2	Minnesota Timberwolves	2	2	0	242	210	+32
3	Dallas Mavericks	2	2	0	228	211	+17
4	Denver Nuggets	2	2	0	260	244	+16

Updated to match(es) played on November 20, 2026. Source:
Rules for classification: Tiebreakers

== Media coverage ==
The 2026 tournament features expanded broadcast coverage as Prime Video streams most group games (on all Fridays of the tournament, two games per night) and all knockout rounds, while ESPN, NBC, NBCSN will cover five games total, two as part of a split doubleheader for NBC/NBCSN and three on ESPN (as part of their regular Coast 2 Coast Tuesday and NBA Wednesday packages) during the week of Thanksgiving nationally. Peacock and ESPN DTC will also simulcast games televised by NBC and ESPN, respectively.
