= 2025–26 Dallas Mavericks season =

2025–26 NBA season by team

- Head coach: Jason Kidd
- President: Ethan Casson
- General manager: Nico Harrison (fired); Michael Finley (interim); Matt Riccardi (interim)
- Owner(s): Miriam Adelson and Patrick Dumont (majority); Mark Cuban (minority)
- Arena: American Airlines Center

Results
- Record: 26–56 (.317)
- Place: Division: 4th (Southwest); Conference: 12th (Western)
- Playoff finish: Did not qualify
- Stats at Basketball Reference

Local media
- Television: TEGNA Inc. (Note: Affiliates include: KFAA-TV/WFAA (Dallas-Fort Worth); KCEN-TV/KCEN-DT2 (Waco); KAGS-LD/KAGS-DT2 (Bryan-College Station); KYTX/KYTX-DT2/KYTX-DT3 (Tyler-Longview); KWES-TV/KWES-DT2 (Midland-Odessa); KXVA/KXVA-DT2 (Abilene); KIDY/KIDY-DT2 (San Angelo); KFDA-TV/KFDA-DT2 (Amarillo); KDBC-DT2 (El Paso); KGBT-TV (Harlingen); KXNU-LD/KGNS-TV/KGNS-DT2/KYLX-DT2 (Laredo); KCBD/KMYL/KLCW (Lubbock); KXII/KXII-DT2 (Sherman); KSHV-TV (Texarkana-Shreveport); KJBO/KJBO-DT2 (Wichita Falls-Lawton))
- Radio: KEGL

The 2025–26 Dallas Mavericks season was the 46th season for the franchise in the National Basketball Association (NBA). After winning the draft lottery, the Mavericks drafted Cooper Flagg first overall. Flagg would then go on to win the NBA Rookie of the Year award following the conclusion of the season.

President of basketball operations and general manager Nico Harrison was fired on November 11, 2025. On January 29, 2026, the Mavericks retired Mark Aguirre's jersey number 24 during their game against the Charlotte Hornets.

On March 10, the Mavericks were unable to improve on their 39-win record from the previous season following a loss to the Atlanta Hawks. On March 23, the Mavericks were eliminated from playoff contention for the second consecutive season and third time in four seasons following an overtime loss to the Golden State Warriors. They finished the regular season with a 26–56 record and 12th in the West, ranking behind the New Orleans Pelicans due to 1–3 season series tiebreaker despite the two teams finishing with identical records.

== Draft ==
| Round | Pick | Player | Position | Nationality | College |
|---|---|---|---|---|---|
| 1 | 1 | Cooper Flagg | PF | United States | Duke |

The Mavericks entered the 2025 NBA draft holding the first overall pick. They had previously traded their second-round pick to the Utah Jazz as part of the Luka Dončić–Anthony Davis three-team trade in February 2025.

Despite having only a 1.8% chance of securing the top selection, they won the NBA draft lottery, becoming the second consecutive team to reach the postseason (via the NBA play-in tournament) and subsequently win the lottery without a trade, joining the 2023–24 Atlanta Hawks. Their lottery position was partly determined by winning a coin flip over the Chicago Bulls, which kept them in the 11th spot prior to the lottery draw. Landing the first overall pick granted them the opportunity to rebuild after trading Luka Dončić to the Los Angeles Lakers earlier in the year. With the first overall pick, Dallas selected Duke University forward Cooper Flagg.

== Roster ==
2025–26 Dallas Mavericks roster
Players

| Pos. | No. | Player | Height | Weight | DOB | From |
|---|---|---|---|---|---|---|
| F | 35 | Marvin Bagley III | 6 ft 10 in (2.08 m) | 235 lb (107 kg) | 1999-03-14 | Duke |
| G | 00 | Max Christie | 6 ft 5 in (1.96 m) | 190 lb (86 kg) | 2003-02-10 | Michigan State |
| C | 30 | Moussa Cissé (TW) | 6 ft 11 in (2.11 m) | 220 lb (100 kg) | 2002-09-10 | Memphis |
| F | 32 | Cooper Flagg | 6 ft 9 in (2.06 m) | 205 lb (93 kg) | 2006-12-21 | Duke |
| F/C | 21 | Daniel Gafford | 6 ft 10 in (2.08 m) | 265 lb (120 kg) | 1998-10-01 | Arkansas |
| G | 11 | Kyrie Irving (injured) | 6 ft 2 in (1.88 m) | 195 lb (88 kg) | 1992-03-23 | Duke |
| G | 8 | AJ Johnson | 6 ft 5 in (1.96 m) | 160 lb (73 kg) | 2004-12-01 |
| C | 2 | Dereck Lively II (injured) | 7 ft 1 in (2.16 m) | 230 lb (104 kg) | 2004-02-12 | Duke |
| F | 13 | Naji Marshall | 6 ft 6 in (1.98 m) | 220 lb (100 kg) | 1998-01-24 | Xavier |
| F | 16 | Caleb Martin | 6 ft 5 in (1.96 m) | 205 lb (93 kg) | 1995-09-28 | Nevada |
| F | 20 | Khris Middleton | 6 ft 7 in (2.01 m) | 222 lb (101 kg) | 1991-08-12 | Texas A&M |
| G | 9 | Ryan Nembhard | 5 ft 11 in (1.80 m) | 180 lb (82 kg) | 2003-03-10 | Gonzaga |
| G | 1 | John Poulakidas (TW) | 6 ft 6 in (1.98 m) | 205 lb (93 kg) | 2003-04-04 | Yale |
| F/C | 7 | Dwight Powell | 6 ft 10 in (2.08 m) | 240 lb (109 kg) | 1991-07-20 | Stanford |
| F | 23 | Tyler Smith (TW) | 6 ft 9 in (2.06 m) | 225 lb (102 kg) | 2004-11-02 | NBA G League Ignite |
| G | 31 | Klay Thompson | 6 ft 5 in (1.96 m) | 220 lb (100 kg) | 1990-02-08 | Washington State |
| F | 25 | P. J. Washington | 6 ft 7 in (2.01 m) | 230 lb (104 kg) | 1998-08-23 | Kentucky |
| G | 10 | Brandon Williams | 6 ft 1 in (1.85 m) | 190 lb (86 kg) | 1999-11-22 | Arizona |

Coaches
Head coach
- Jason Kidd
Assistant(s)
- Dru Anthrop
- Josh Broghamer
- Phil Handy
- Eric Hughes
- Popeye Jones
- Mike Penberthy
- Jordan Sears
- Jay Triano
- Keith Veney
- Frank Vogel (associate HC)

Legend
- (DP) Unsigned draft pick
- (FA) Free agent
- (S) Suspended
- (GL) On assignment to G League affiliate
- (TW) Two-way affiliate player
- Injured

Roster
Updated: March 5, 2026

== Standings ==
=== Division ===
| Southwest Division | W | L | PCT | GB | Home | Road | Div | GP |
|---|---|---|---|---|---|---|---|---|
| y – San Antonio Spurs | 62 | 20 | .756 | – | 32‍–‍8 | 30‍–‍12 | 13‍–‍3 | 82 |
| x – Houston Rockets | 52 | 30 | .634 | 10.0 | 30‍–‍11 | 22‍–‍19 | 10‍–‍6 | 82 |
| New Orleans Pelicans | 26 | 56 | .317 | 36.0 | 17‍–‍24 | 9‍–‍32 | 7‍–‍9 | 82 |
| Dallas Mavericks | 26 | 56 | .317 | 36.0 | 16‍–‍25 | 10‍–‍31 | 4‍–‍12 | 82 |
| Memphis Grizzlies | 25 | 57 | .305 | 37.0 | 14‍–‍27 | 11‍–‍30 | 6‍–‍10 | 82 |

=== Conference ===
Western Conference
| # | Team | W | L | PCT | GB | GP |
|---|---|---|---|---|---|---|
| 1 | z – Oklahoma City Thunder * | 64 | 18 | .780 | – | 82 |
| 2 | y – San Antonio Spurs * | 62 | 20 | .756 | 2.0 | 82 |
| 3 | x – Denver Nuggets | 54 | 28 | .659 | 10.0 | 82 |
| 4 | y – Los Angeles Lakers * | 53 | 29 | .646 | 11.0 | 82 |
| 5 | x – Houston Rockets | 52 | 30 | .634 | 12.0 | 82 |
| 6 | x – Minnesota Timberwolves | 49 | 33 | .598 | 15.0 | 82 |
| 7 | x – Phoenix Suns | 45 | 37 | .549 | 19.0 | 82 |
| 8 | x – Portland Trail Blazers | 42 | 40 | .512 | 22.0 | 82 |
| 9 | pi – Los Angeles Clippers | 42 | 40 | .512 | 22.0 | 82 |
| 10 | pi – Golden State Warriors | 37 | 45 | .451 | 27.0 | 82 |
| 11 | New Orleans Pelicans | 26 | 56 | .317 | 38.0 | 82 |
| 12 | Dallas Mavericks | 26 | 56 | .317 | 38.0 | 82 |
| 13 | Memphis Grizzlies | 25 | 57 | .305 | 39.0 | 82 |
| 14 | Sacramento Kings | 22 | 60 | .268 | 42.0 | 82 |
| 15 | Utah Jazz | 22 | 60 | .268 | 42.0 | 82 |

== Game log ==
=== Preseason ===
The preseason schedule was announced on July 30, 2025.

2025 preseason game log
Total: 3–1 (Home: 1–1; Road: 2–0)
Preseason: 3–1 (home: 1–1; road: 2–0)

| Game | Date | Team | Score | High points | High rebounds | High assists | Location Attendance | Record |
|---|---|---|---|---|---|---|---|---|
| 1 | October 6 | Oklahoma City | W 106–89 | P. J. Washington (14) | Davis, Powell (7) | D'Angelo Russell (5) | Dickies Arena; 12,159 | 1–0 |
| 2 | October 11 | Charlotte | L 116–120 | Klay Thompson (14) | Dereck Lively II (6) | D'Angelo Russell (5) | American Airlines Center; 1,841 | 1–1 |
| 3 | October 13 | @ Utah | W 114–101 | Anthony Davis (25) | Cooper Flagg (7) | Ryan Nembhard (12) | Delta Center; 13,182 | 2–1 |
| 4 | October 15 | @ L.A. Lakers | W 121–94 | Anthony Davis (18) | Dereck Lively II (11) | P.J. Washington (6) | T-Mobile Arena; 12,770 | 3–1 |

2025–26 preseason schedule

=== Regular season ===
The schedule was announced on August 14, 2025.

2025–26 game log
Total: 26–56 (Home: 16–25; Road: 10–31)
October: 2–3 (home: 2–3; road: 0–0)

| Game | Date | Team | Score | High points | High rebounds | High assists | Location Attendance | Record |
|---|---|---|---|---|---|---|---|---|
| 1 | October 22 | San Antonio | L 92–125 | Anthony Davis (22) | Anthony Davis (13) | Ryan Nembhard (5) | American Airlines Center; 20,122 | 0–1 |
| 2 | October 24 | Washington | L 107–117 | Anthony Davis (27) | Anthony Davis (13) | Cooper Flagg (6) | American Airlines Center; 19,225 | 0–2 |
| 3 | October 26 | Toronto | W 139–129 | Anthony Davis (25) | Anthony Davis (10) | D'Angelo Russell (6) | American Airlines Center; 19,232 | 1–2 |
| 4 | October 27 | Oklahoma City | L 94–101 | Anthony Davis (26) | Anthony Davis (11) | D'Angelo Russell (10) | American Airlines Center; 19,303 | 1–3 |
| 5 | October 29 | Indiana | W 107–105 | Brandon Williams (20) | P. J. Washington (11) | D'Angelo Russell (5) | American Airlines Center; 19,141 | 2–3 |

November : 4–12 (home: 2–6; road: 2–6)

| Game | Date | Team | Score | High points | High rebounds | High assists | Location Attendance | Record |
|---|---|---|---|---|---|---|---|---|
| 6 | November 1 | @ Detroit | L 110–122 | D'Angelo Russell (31) | Cooper Flagg (8) | Christie, Washington (5) | Mexico City Arena; 20,385 | 2–4 |
| 7 | November 3 | @ Houston | L 102–110 | P. J. Washington (29) | P. J. Washington (12) | D'Angelo Russell (12) | Toyota Center; 18,055 | 2–5 |
| 8 | November 5 | New Orleans | L 99–101 | Cooper Flagg (20) | P. J. Washington (11) | Naji Marshall (5) | American Airlines Center; 18,925 | 2–6 |
| 9 | November 7 | @ Memphis | L 104–118 | Max Christie (18) | Moussa Cissé (8) | D'Angelo Russell (5) | FedExForum; 15,028 | 2–7 |
| 10 | November 8 | @ Washington | W 111–105 | Naji Marshall (30) | P. J. Washington (10) | Flagg, Williams (6) | Capital One Arena; 16,258 | 3–7 |
| 11 | November 10 | Milwaukee | L 114–116 | Cooper Flagg (26) | Cooper Flagg (9) | Cooper Flagg (4) | American Airlines Center; 19,132 | 3–8 |
| 12 | November 12 | Phoenix | L 114–123 | Klay Thompson (19) | Daniel Gafford (9) | Brandon Williams (9) | American Airlines Center; 19,501 | 3–9 |
| 13 | November 14 | L.A. Clippers | L 127–133 (2OT) | Marshall, Russell (28) | Gafford, Marshall (8) | Russell, Williams (5) | American Airlines Center; 18,624 | 3–10 |
| 14 | November 16 | Portland | W 138–133 (OT) | Flagg, Washington (21) | Naji Marshall (9) | D'Angelo Russell (7) | American Airlines Center; 18,808 | 4–10 |
| 15 | November 17 | @ Minnesota | L 96–120 | Flagg, Williams (15) | Moussa Cissé (10) | D'Angelo Russell (4) | Target Center; 16,712 | 4–11 |
| 16 | November 19 | New York | L 111–113 | Marshall, Russell (23) | Lively II, Washington (10) | D'Angelo Russell (7) | American Airlines Center; 18,513 | 4–12 |
| 17 | November 21 | New Orleans | W 118–115 | Cooper Flagg (29) | P. J. Washington (9) | Brandon Williams (12) | American Airlines Center; 18,506 | 5–12 |
| 18 | November 22 | Memphis | L 96–102 | Klay Thompson (21) | Gafford, Washington (8) | four players (4) | American Airlines Center; 19,623 | 5–13 |
| 19 | November 24 | @ Miami | L 102–106 | P. J. Washington (27) | Daniel Gafford (11) | Ryan Nembhard (7) | Kaseya Center; 18,997 | 5–14 |
| 20 | November 28 | @ L.A. Lakers | L 119–129 | P. J. Washington (22) | P. J. Washington (9) | Cooper Flagg (11) | Crypto.com Arena; 19,600 | 5–15 |
| 21 | November 29 | @ L.A. Clippers | W 114–110 | Cooper Flagg (35) | Flagg, Marshall (8) | Brandon Williams (7) | Intuit Dome; 17,927 | 6–15 |

December : 6–7 (home: 5–0; road: 1–7)

| Game | Date | Team | Score | High points | High rebounds | High assists | Location Attendance | Record |
|---|---|---|---|---|---|---|---|---|
| 22 | December 1 | @ Denver | W 131–121 | Anthony Davis (32) | Anthony Davis (13) | Ryan Nembhard (10) | Ball Arena; 19,587 | 7–15 |
| 23 | December 3 | Miami | W 118–108 | Cooper Flagg (22) | Anthony Davis (17) | Ryan Nembhard (13) | American Airlines Center; 19,509 | 8–15 |
| 24 | December 5 | @ Oklahoma City | L 111–132 | Jaden Hardy (23) | Anthony Davis (8) | Brandon Williams (7) | Paycom Center; 18,203 | 8–16 |
| 25 | December 6 | Houston | W 122–109 | Anthony Davis (29) | Anthony Davis (8) | Ryan Nembhard (7) | American Airlines Center; 19,310 | 9–16 |
| 26 | December 12 | Brooklyn | W 119–111 | Anthony Davis (24) | Anthony Davis (14) | Cooper Flagg (8) | American Airlines Center; 19,032 | 10–16 |
| 27 | December 15 | @ Utah | L 133–140 (OT) | Cooper Flagg (42) | P. J. Washington (13) | Ryan Nembhard (11) | Delta Center; 18,186 | 10–17 |
| 28 | December 18 | Detroit | W 116–114 (OT) | Cooper Flagg (23) | Anthony Davis (14) | Ryan Nembhard (7) | American Airlines Center; 19,600 | 11–17 |
| 29 | December 20 | @ Philadelphia | L 114–121 | Davis, Flagg (24) | Anthony Davis (15) | Nembhard, Williams (5) | Xfinity Mobile Arena; 19,056 | 11–18 |
| 30 | December 22 | @ New Orleans | L 113–119 | Anthony Davis (35) | Anthony Davis (17) | Ryan Nembhard (8) | Smoothie King Center; 16,978 | 11–19 |
| 31 | December 23 | Denver | W 131–130 | Cooper Flagg (31) | Davis, Flagg (9) | Cooper Flagg (9) | American Airlines Center; 19,432 | 12–19 |
| 32 | December 25 | @ Golden State | L 116–126 | Cooper Flagg (27) | P. J. Washington (10) | Cooper Flagg (5) | Chase Center; 18,064 | 12–20 |
| 33 | December 27 | @ Sacramento | L 107–113 | Cooper Flagg (23) | Dwight Powell (11) | Christie, Flagg (5) | Golden 1 Center; 17,832 | 12–21 |
| 34 | December 29 | @ Portland | L 122–125 | Max Christie (25) | Daniel Gafford (10) | Cooper Flagg (8) | Moda Center; 18,067 | 12–22 |

January: 7–8 (home: 5–5; road: 2–3)

| Game | Date | Team | Score | High points | High rebounds | High assists | Location Attendance | Record |
|---|---|---|---|---|---|---|---|---|
| 35 | January 1 | Philadelphia | L 108–123 | Max Christie (18) | Anthony Davis (8) | Cooper Flagg (7) | American Airlines Center; 19,832 | 12–23 |
| 36 | January 3 | Houston | W 110–104 | Anthony Davis (26) | Anthony Davis (12) | Cooper Flagg (6) | American Airlines Center; 19,703 | 13–23 |
| 37 | January 6 | @ Sacramento | W 100–98 | Cooper Flagg (20) | Anthony Davis (16) | Cooper Flagg (6) | Golden 1 Center; 15,058 | 14–23 |
| 38 | January 8 | @ Utah | L 114–116 | Cooper Flagg (26) | Anthony Davis (11) | Cooper Flagg (8) | Delta Center; 18,186 | 14–24 |
| 39 | January 10 | @ Chicago | L 107–125 | Ryan Nembhard (16) | Moussa Cissé (10) | Ryan Nembhard (6) | United Center; 19,753 | 14–25 |
| 40 | January 12 | Brooklyn | W 113–105 | Cooper Flagg (27) | Dwight Powell (10) | Naji Marshall (9) | American Airlines Center; 18,632 | 15–25 |
| 41 | January 14 | Denver | L 109–118 | Naji Marshall (24) | Daniel Gafford (10) | Ryan Nembhard (4) | American Airlines Center; 18,888 | 15–26 |
| 42 | January 15 | Utah | W 144–122 | Klay Thompson (26) | Moussa Cissé (13) | Ryan Nembhard (10) | American Airlines Center; 18,713 | 16–26 |
| 43 | January 17 | Utah | W 138–120 | Klay Thompson (23) | Moussa Cissé (10) | Naji Marshall (6) | American Airlines Center; 20,031 | 17–26 |
| 44 | January 19 | @ New York | W 114–97 | Max Christie (26) | Moussa Cissé (9) | Ryan Nembhard (5) | Madison Square Garden; 19,812 | 18–26 |
| 45 | January 22 | Golden State | W 123–115 | Naji Marshall (30) | Dwight Powell (12) | Naji Marshall (9) | American Airlines Center; 19,432 | 19–26 |
| 46 | January 24 | L.A. Lakers | L 110–116 | Max Christie (24) | Naji Marshall (11) | Cooper Flagg (6) | American Airlines Center; 19,880 | 19–27 |
| — | January 25 | @ Milwaukee | Postponed due to the January 2026 North American winter storm. Makeup date March 31. | | | | | |
| 47 | January 28 | Minnesota | L 105–118 | P. J. Washington (21) | Dwight Powell (9) | Caleb Martin (5) | American Airlines Center; 18,680 | 19–28 |
| 48 | January 29 | Charlotte | L 121–123 | Cooper Flagg (49) | Caleb Martin (11) | Brandon Williams (6) | American Airlines Center; 19,024 | 19–29 |
| 49 | January 31 | @ Houston | L 107–111 | Cooper Flagg (34) | Cooper Flagg (12) | Flagg, Martin (5) | Toyota Center; 18,055 | 19–30 |

February: 2–8 (home: 0–4; road: 2–4)

| Game | Date | Team | Score | High points | High rebounds | High assists | Location Attendance | Record |
|---|---|---|---|---|---|---|---|---|
| 50 | February 3 | Boston | L 100–110 | Cooper Flagg (36) | Daniel Gafford (12) | Cooper Flagg (6) | American Airlines Center; 19,132 | 19–31 |
| 51 | February 5 | San Antonio | L 123–135 | Flagg, Marshall (32) | Daniel Gafford (10) | Ryan Nembhard (7) | American Airlines Center; 19,413 | 19–32 |
| 52 | February 7 | @ San Antonio | L 125–138 | Klay Thompson (19) | Marvin Bagley III (12) | Tyus Jones (7) | Frost Bank Center; 18,617 | 19–33 |
| 53 | February 10 | @ Phoenix | L 111–120 | Naji Marshall (31) | Marvin Bagley III (8) | Christie, Jones (3) | Mortgage Matchup Center; 17,071 | 19–34 |
| 54 | February 12 | @ L.A. Lakers | L 104–124 | Christie, Marshall (19) | Daniel Gafford (6) | Brandon Williams (7) | Crypto.com Arena; 18,679 | 19–35 |
All-Star Game
| 55 | February 20 | @ Minnesota | L 111–121 | Khris Middleton (18) | Marvin Bagley III (13) | Tyus Jones (6) | Target Center; 18,978 | 19–36 |
| 56 | February 22 | @ Indiana | W 134–130 | Khris Middleton (25) | Marvin Bagley III (11) | Middleton, Williams (7) | Gainbridge Fieldhouse; 17,274 | 20–36 |
| 57 | February 24 | @ Brooklyn | W 123–114 | Marvin Bagley III (22) | Max Christie (7) | Brandon Williams (10) | Barclays Center; 16,510 | 21–36 |
| 58 | February 26 | Sacramento | L 121–130 | Naji Marshall (36) | Naji Marshall (10) | Naji Marshall (6) | American Airlines Center; 19,013 | 21–37 |
| 59 | February 27 | Memphis | L 105–124 | Brandon Williams (16) | Dwight Powell (11) | four players (4) | American Airlines Center; 19,165 | 21–38 |

March: 3–13 (home: 0–6; road: 3–7)

| Game | Date | Team | Score | High points | High rebounds | High assists | Location Attendance | Record |
|---|---|---|---|---|---|---|---|---|
| 60 | March 1 | Oklahoma City | L 87–100 | Caleb Martin (18) | Moussa Cissé (12) | Ryan Nembhard (5) | American Airlines Center; 18,900 | 21–39 |
| 61 | March 3 | @ Charlotte | L 90–117 | Brandon Williams (18) | Khris Middleton (8) | Ryan Nembhard (4) | Spectrum Center; 19,519 | 21–40 |
| 62 | March 5 | @ Orlando | L 114–115 | Klay Thompson (24) | Daniel Gafford (13) | Khris Middleton (7) | Kia Center; 16,996 | 21–41 |
| 63 | March 6 | @ Boston | L 100–120 | Klay Thompson (19) | Cooper Flagg (8) | Cooper Flagg (6) | TD Garden; 19,156 | 21–42 |
| 64 | March 8 | @ Toronto | L 92–122 | Daniel Gafford (21) | Daniel Gafford (11) | Cooper Flagg (6) | Scotiabank Arena; 19,800 | 21–43 |
| 65 | March 10 | @ Atlanta | L 112–124 | Klay Thompson (21) | Cooper Flagg (12) | Marvin Bagley III (6) | State Farm Arena; 15,514 | 21–44 |
| 66 | March 12 | @ Memphis | W 120–112 | Khris Middleton (35) | Daniel Gafford (14) | Cooper Flagg (7) | FedExForum; 15,029 | 22–44 |
| 67 | March 13 | Cleveland | L 105–138 | Cooper Flagg (25) | Dwight Powell (11) | Ryan Nembhard (9) | American Airlines Center; 19,512 | 22–45 |
| 68 | March 15 | @ Cleveland | W 130–120 | Cooper Flagg (27) | P. J. Washington (11) | Cooper Flagg (10) | Rocket Arena; 19,432 | 23–45 |
| 69 | March 16 | @ New Orleans | L 111–129 | Naji Marshall (32) | Marvin Bagley III (9) | Cooper Flagg (8) | Smoothie King Center; 16,787 | 23–46 |
| 70 | March 18 | Atlanta | L 120–135 | Daniel Gafford (24) | P. J. Washington (9) | Ryan Nembhard (12) | American Airlines Center; 19,807 | 23–47 |
| 71 | March 21 | L.A. Clippers | L 131–138 (OT) | Naji Marshall (28) | Daniel Gafford (13) | Ryan Nembhard (9) | American Airlines Center; 19,365 | 23–48 |
| 72 | March 23 | Golden State | L 131–137 | Cooper Flagg (32) | Daniel Gafford (7) | Cooper Flagg (9) | American Airlines Center; 18,821 | 23–49 |
| 73 | March 25 | @ Denver | L 135–142 | Cooper Flagg (26) | P. J. Washington (15) | Cooper Flagg (7) | Ball Arena; 19,837 | 23–50 |
| 74 | March 27 | @ Portland | W 100–93 | Marvin Bagley III (26) | Marvin Bagley III (9) | Brandon Williams (5) | Moda Center; 17,701 | 24–50 |
| 75 | March 30 | Minnesota | L 94–124 | Daniel Gafford (21) | three players (8) | Brandon Williams (7) | American Airlines Center; 20,021 | 24–51 |
| 76 | March 31 | @ Milwaukee | L 99–123 | Cooper Flagg (19) | Moussa Cissé (13) | Ryan Nembhard (4) | Fiserv Forum; 16,414 | 24–52 |

April: 2–4 (home: 2–1; road: 0–3)

| Game | Date | Team | Score | High points | High rebounds | High assists | Location Attendance | Record |
|---|---|---|---|---|---|---|---|---|
| 77 | April 3 | Orlando | L 127–138 | Cooper Flagg (51) | Ryan Nembhard (7) | Nembhard, Williams (5) | American Airlines Center; 19,358 | 24–53 |
| 78 | April 5 | L.A. Lakers | W 134–128 | Cooper Flagg (45) | Cooper Flagg (8) | Cooper Flagg (9) | American Airlines Center; 19,829 | 25–53 |
| 79 | April 7 | @ L.A. Clippers | L 103–116 | Cooper Flagg (25) | Bagley III, Flagg (9) | Ryan Nembhard (7) | Intuit Dome; 17,927 | 25–54 |
| 80 | April 8 | @ Phoenix | L 107–112 | John Poulakidas (23) | Cooper Flagg (11) | Ryan Nembhard (7) | Mortgage Matchup Center; 17,071 | 25–55 |
| 81 | April 10 | @ San Antonio | L 120–139 | Cooper Flagg (33) | Dwight Powell (11) | Ryan Nembhard (7) | Frost Bank Center; 18,681 | 25–56 |
| 82 | April 12 | Chicago | W 149–128 | John Poulakidas (28) | Moussa Cissé (20) | Ryan Nembhard (23) | American Airlines Center; 20,232 | 26–56 |

2025–26 season schedule

=== NBA Cup ===
==== West Group B ====
| Pos | Team | Pld | W | L | PF | PA | PD | Qualification |
|---|---|---|---|---|---|---|---|---|
| 1 | Los Angeles Lakers | 4 | 4 | 0 | 499 | 453 | +46 | Advanced to knockout rounds |
| 2 | Memphis Grizzlies | 4 | 3 | 1 | 464 | 450 | +14 | |
| 3 | Los Angeles Clippers | 4 | 2 | 2 | 465 | 485 | −20 | |
| 4 | Dallas Mavericks | 4 | 1 | 3 | 455 | 476 | −21 | |
| 5 | New Orleans Pelicans | 4 | 0 | 4 | 465 | 484 | −19 | |

Source: NBA

2024–25 game log
Total: 1–3 (Home: 1–2; Road: 0–2)
NBA Cup: 1–3 (home: 1–1; road: 0–2)

| Game | Date | Team | Score | High points | High rebounds | High assists | Location Attendance | Record |
|---|---|---|---|---|---|---|---|---|
| 1 | November 7 | @ Memphis | L 104–118 | Max Christie (18) | Moussa Cissé (8) | D'Angelo Russell (5) | FedExForum; 15,028 | 0–1 |
| 2 | November 14 | L.A. Clippers | L 127–133 (2OT) | Marshall, Russell (28) | Gafford, Marshall (8) | Russell, Williams (5) | American Airlines Center; 18,624 | 0–2 |
| 3 | November 21 | New Orleans | W 118–115 | Cooper Flagg (29) | P. J. Washington (9) | Brandon Williams (12) | American Airlines Center; 18,506 | 5–12 |
| 4 | November 28 | @ L.A. Lakers | L 119–129 | P. J. Washington (22) | P. J. Washington (9) | Cooper Flagg (11) | Crypto.com Arena; 19,600 | 5–15 |

== Player statistics ==
Legend
| GP | Games played | GS | Games started | MPG | Minutes per game |
| FG% | Field-goal percentage | 3P% | 3-point field-goal percentage | FT% | Free-throw percentage |
| RPG | Rebounds per game | APG | Assists per game | SPG | Steals per game |
| BPG | Blocks per game | PPG | Points per game |

=== Regular season ===
After all games.

Dallas Mavericks statistics
| Player | GP | GS | MPG | FG% | 3P% | FT% | RPG | APG | SPG | BPG | PPG |
|---|---|---|---|---|---|---|---|---|---|---|---|
| Marvin Bagley III^{≠} | 22 | 4 | 21.4 | .606 | .485 | .553 | 6.8 | 1.3 | .4 | .7 | 11.0 |
| Max Christie | 77 | 68 | 29.1 | .441 | .404 | .899 | 3.2 | 2.0 | .6 | .4 | 12.3 |
| Moussa Cissé | 38 | 1 | 13.9 | .574 | — | .469 | 5.7 | .2 | .5 | 1.2 | 4.5 |
| Anthony Davis^{‡} | 20 | 20 | 31.3 | .506 | .270 | .728 | 11.1 | 2.8 | 1.1 | 1.7 | 20.4 |
| Cooper Flagg | 70 | 70 | 33.5 | .468 | .295 | .827 | 6.7 | 4.5 | 1.2 | .9 | 21.0 |
| Daniel Gafford | 55 | 44 | 21.7 | .655 | — | .683 | 6.9 | 1.1 | .8 | 1.3 | 9.5 |
| Jaden Hardy | 34 | 4 | 12.6 | .402 | .371 | .775 | 1.4 | .9 | .3 | .1 | 6.9 |
| AJ Johnson^{≠} | 23 | 0 | 10.4 | .323 | .156 | .893 | 1.0 | 1.1 | .2 | .1 | 3.9 |
| Tyus Jones^{≠}^{~} | 8 | 2 | 16.6 | .382 | .211 | .500 | 1.1 | 3.8 | .4 | .0 | 3.9 |
| Miles Kelly^{~} | 14 | 0 | 9.6 | .364 | .303 | 1.000 | 1.7 | .9 | .3 | .1 | 3.1 |
| Dereck Lively II | 7 | 4 | 16.4 | .611 | — | .800 | 5.3 | 1.9 | .6 | 1.6 | 4.3 |
| Naji Marshall | 74 | 47 | 29.5 | .510 | .291 | .760 | 4.7 | 3.3 | 1.1 | .1 | 15.2 |
| Caleb Martin | 58 | 12 | 14.8 | .450 | .351 | .607 | 2.5 | 1.4 | .7 | .3 | 3.9 |
| Khris Middleton^{≠} | 29 | 16 | 21.1 | .404 | .391 | .910 | 3.3 | 2.2 | .5 | .0 | 10.0 |
| Ryan Nembhard | 60 | 27 | 19.5 | .415 | .356 | .806 | 2.2 | 5.3 | .4 | .0 | 6.6 |
| John Poulakidas | 13 | 0 | 19.5 | .429 | .403 | .857 | 2.3 | .8 | .5 | .3 | 8.8 |
| Dwight Powell | 63 | 12 | 14.3 | .644 | .286 | .696 | 4.1 | 1.1 | .5 | .3 | 3.3 |
| Jeremiah Robinson-Earl | 5 | 0 | 12.2 | .471 | .250 | 1.000 | 3.0 | .6 | .4 | .0 | 4.4 |
| D'Angelo Russell | 26 | 3 | 19.0 | .405 | .295 | .717 | 2.3 | 4.0 | .5 | .1 | 10.2 |
| Tyler Smith | 12 | 0 | 13.8 | .420 | .286 | .667 | 2.8 | .4 | .5 | .0 | 4.7 |
| Klay Thompson | 69 | 8 | 21.7 | .393 | .383 | .766 | 2.1 | 1.4 | .5 | .3 | 11.7 |
| P. J. Washington | 56 | 53 | 31.0 | .450 | .325 | .687 | 7.0 | 1.8 | 1.0 | 1.1 | 14.2 |
| Brandon Williams | 66 | 15 | 22.2 | .472 | .232 | .793 | 2.9 | 3.9 | .9 | .3 | 13.0 |

^{‡}Traded during the season
^{≠}Acquired during the season
^{~}Waived during the season

== Transactions ==
=== Trades ===
| Date | Trade | | Ref. |
|---|---|---|---|
| February 5, 2026 | Three-team trade | | |
| February 5, 2026 | To Dallas Mavericks: Khris Middleton; AJ Johnson; Tyus Jones; Marvin Bagley III; 2026 first-round pick (Note: The least favorable of the picks originally belonging to Houston, LA Clippers, and Oklahoma City; Houston's pick is protected and only available if No. 5–30.); 2026 second-round pick (from Phoenix); 2027 second-round pick (from Chicago); 2029 second-round pick (from Houston); 2030 protected first-round pick (from Golden State) (Note: Dallas will receive the pick if it's No. 21–30.) | To Washington Wizards: Anthony Davis; Jaden Hardy; D'Angelo Russell; Danté Exum | |
| February 5, 2026 | To Charlotte Hornets: Malaki Branham | | |

=== Free agency ===
==== Re-signed ====
| Player | Signed | Ref. |
|---|---|---|
| Kyrie Irving | July 6 | |
| Daniel Gafford | July 13 | |
| Danté Exum | September 2 | |
| Jason Kidd | October 15 | |

==== Additions ====
| Player | Date | Former team | Ref. |
|---|---|---|---|
| Miles Kelly | July 5 | Auburn Tigers | |
| Ryan Nembhard | July 5 | Gonzaga Bulldogs | |
| D'Angelo Russell | July 6 | Brooklyn Nets | |
| Moussa Cisse | July 8 | Memphis Tigers | |
| Matthew Cleveland | July 8 | Miami Hurricanes | |
| D’Moi Hodge | September 19 | (Greece) Aris | |
| Dennis Smith Jr. | September 26 | (Spain) Real Madrid | |
| Jeremiah Robinson-Earl | September 26 | New Orleans Pelicans | |
| John Poulakidas | March 3 | San Diego Clippers | |
| Tyler Smith | March 3 | Rio Grande Valley Vipers | |

==== Subtractions ====
| Player | Date | New team | Ref. |
|---|---|---|---|
| Spencer Dinwiddie | July 13 | Charlotte Hornets | |
| Olivier-Maxence Prosper | September 2 | Memphis Grizzlies | |
| Kai Jones | September 15 | Anadolu Efes | |
| D'Moi Hodge | September 26 | Texas Legends | |
| Tyus Jones | March 1 | Denver Nuggets | |
| Miles Kelly | March 3 | Texas Legends | |

== Awards ==
| Player | Award | Date awarded |
|---|---|---|
| Cooper Flagg | Rookie of the Year | April 28 |
| Cooper Flagg | NBA All-Rookie First Team | May 20 |
| Cooper Flagg | Rookie of the Month | October/November; December; January |
