= 2025–26 New Orleans Pelicans season =

- Head coach: Willie Green (fired, games 1–12); James Borrego (interim, games 13–82)
- President: Dennis Lauscha
- General manager: Joe Dumars
- Owner: Gayle Benson
- Arena: Smoothie King Center

Results
- Record: 26–56 (.317)
- Place: Division: 3rd (Southwest); Conference: 11th (Western)
- Playoff finish: Did not qualify
- Stats at Basketball Reference

Local media
- Television: Gulf Coast Sports & Entertainment Network
- Radio: WWL (AM) and WWL-FM

The 2025–26 New Orleans Pelicans season was the 24th season of the New Orleans Pelicans franchise in the National Basketball Association (NBA). On November 15, 2025, head coach Willie Green was fired by the Pelicans after a 2-10 start of the season, and was replaced by associate coach James Borrego as the interim head coach.

On March 24, 2026, the Pelicans were eliminated from playoff contention for the second season in a row and third time in four seasons following their loss to the New York Knicks. The team finished 11th in the West with a 26–56 record, a five-game improvement over their previous season, ending with the same record as the Dallas Mavericks but clinching the tiebreaker due to a 3–1 season series win.

== Draft ==
Round	Pick	Player	Position	Nationality	College
1	7	Jeremiah Fears	PG/SG	United States	Oklahoma
1	23	Asa Newell	PF	United States	Georgia

The Pelicans entered the draft holding two first-round selections; they had acquired the 23rd overall pick just days earlier from the Indiana Pacers. The team had traded their second-round pick to the Memphis Grizzlies in 2021; it was ultimately held by the Charlotte Hornets on draft night. They used the 23rd overall pick to select Asa Newell, but they traded his draft rights and their 2026 first-round pick to the Atlanta Hawks in exchange for the rights to the 13th overall pick, Derik Queen.

== Roster ==
2025–26 New Orleans Pelicans roster
Players

Pos.	No.	Player	Height	Weight	DOB	From
G	23	Trey Alexander (TW)	6 ft 4 in (1.93 m)	180 lb (82 kg)	2003-05-02	Creighton
G/F	41	Saddiq Bey	6 ft 7 in (2.01 m)	215 lb (98 kg)	1999-04-09	Villanova
C	4	Hunter Dickinson (TW)	7 ft 1 in (2.16 m)	255 lb (116 kg)	2000-11-25	Kansas
G	0	Jeremiah Fears	6 ft 4 in (1.93 m)	190 lb (86 kg)	2006-10-14	Oklahoma
G	24	Jordan Hawkins	6 ft 5 in (1.96 m)	190 lb (86 kg)	2002-04-29	Connecticut
F	2	Herbert Jones	6 ft 7 in (2.01 m)	206 lb (93 kg)	1998-10-06	Alabama
C	6	DeAndre Jordan	6 ft 11 in (2.11 m)	265 lb (120 kg)	1988-07-21	Texas A&M
C	55	Kevon Looney	6 ft 9 in (2.06 m)	222 lb (101 kg)	1996-02-06	UCLA
F/C	17	Karlo Matković	6 ft 10 in (2.08 m)	231 lb (105 kg)	2001-03-30	Croatia
G	11	Bryce McGowens	6 ft 6 in (1.98 m)	190 lb (86 kg)	2002-11-08	Nebraska
C	21	Yves Missi	6 ft 11 in (2.11 m)	235 lb (107 kg)	2004-05-14	Baylor
F	25	Trey Murphy III	6 ft 8 in (2.03 m)	206 lb (93 kg)	2000-06-18	Virginia
G	5	Dejounte Murray	6 ft 4 in (1.93 m)	180 lb (82 kg)	1996-09-19	Washington
F/C	13	Josh Oduro (TW)	6 ft 9 in (2.06 m)	240 lb (109 kg)	2000-10-14	Providence
G/F	14	Micah Peavy	6 ft 7 in (2.01 m)	215 lb (98 kg)	2001-07-16	Georgetown
G	3	Jordan Poole	6 ft 4 in (1.93 m)	194 lb (88 kg)	1999-06-19	Michigan
C	22	Derik Queen	6 ft 10 in (2.08 m)	250 lb (113 kg)	2004-11-27	Maryland
F	1	Zion Williamson	6 ft 6 in (1.98 m)	284 lb (129 kg)	2000-07-06	Duke

Coaches
Head coach
- James Borrego (Interim HC)
Assistant(s)
- Corey Brewer
- Jarron Collins
- Casey Hill
- Jodie Meeks
- Aaron Miles

Legend
- (DP) Unsigned draft pick
- (FA) Free agent
- (S) Suspended
- (GL) On assignment to G League
- (TW) Two-way affiliate player
- Injured

Roster
Updated: March 4, 2026

== Standings ==
=== Division ===
Southwest Division	W	L	PCT	GB	Home	Road	Div	GP
y – San Antonio Spurs	62	20	.756	–	32‍–‍8	30‍–‍12	13‍–‍3	82
x – Houston Rockets	52	30	.634	10.0	30‍–‍11	22‍–‍19	10‍–‍6	82
New Orleans Pelicans	26	56	.317	36.0	17‍–‍24	9‍–‍32	7‍–‍9	82
Dallas Mavericks	26	56	.317	36.0	16‍–‍25	10‍–‍31	4‍–‍12	82
Memphis Grizzlies	25	57	.305	37.0	14‍–‍27	11‍–‍30	6‍–‍10	82

=== Conference ===
Western Conference
#	Team	W	L	PCT	GB	GP
1	z – Oklahoma City Thunder *	64	18	.780	–	82
2	y – San Antonio Spurs *	62	20	.756	2.0	82
3	x – Denver Nuggets	54	28	.659	10.0	82
4	y – Los Angeles Lakers *	53	29	.646	11.0	82
5	x – Houston Rockets	52	30	.634	12.0	82
6	x – Minnesota Timberwolves	49	33	.598	15.0	82
7	x – Phoenix Suns	45	37	.549	19.0	82
8	x – Portland Trail Blazers	42	40	.512	22.0	82
9	pi – Los Angeles Clippers	42	40	.512	22.0	82
10	pi – Golden State Warriors	37	45	.451	27.0	82
11	New Orleans Pelicans	26	56	.317	38.0	82
12	Dallas Mavericks	26	56	.317	38.0	82
13	Memphis Grizzlies	25	57	.305	39.0	82
14	Sacramento Kings	22	60	.268	42.0	82
15	Utah Jazz	22	60	.268	42.0	82

== Game log ==
=== Preseason ===
2025 preseason game log
Total: 2–2 (Home: 2–1; Road: 0–1)
Preseason: 2–2 (home: 2–1; road: 0–1)

Game	Date	Team	Score	High points	High rebounds	High assists	Location Attendance	Record
1	October 3	Melbourne	W 107–97	Trey Murphy III (18)	Yves Missi (8)	Zion Williamson (5)	(Australia) Rod Laver Arena; 14,880	1–0
2	October 5	S.E. Melbourne	W 127–92	Saddiq Bey (21)	Zion Williamson (9)	Alvarado, Poole (4)	(Australia) Rod Laver Arena; 15,164	2–0
3	October 14	Houston	L 128–130	Jeremiah Fears (20)	Yves Missi (10)	Fears, Williamson (4)	Legacy Arena; 12,444	2–1
4	October 16	@ Orlando	L 125–132	Jordan Poole (21)	Missy, Murphy III (7)	Zion Williamson (6)	Kia Center; 16,014	2–2

2025–26 preseason schedule

=== Regular season ===
2025–26 game log
Total: 26–56 (Home: 17–24; Road: 9–32)
October: 0–5 (home: 0–2; road: 0–3)

Game	Date	Team	Score	High points	High rebounds	High assists	Location Attendance	Record
1	October 22	@ Memphis	L 122–128	Zion Williamson (27)	Jones, Williamson (9)	Zion Williamson (5)	FedExForum; 17,794	0–1
2	October 24	San Antonio	L 116–120	Zion Williamson (27)	Murphy III, Williamson (10)	Zion Williamson (7)	Smoothie King Center; 18,363	0–2
3	October 27	Boston	L 90–122	Jordan Poole (22)	Yves Missi (7)	Trey Murphy III (5)	Smoothie King Center; 16,787	0–3
4	October 29	@ Denver	L 88–122	Jeremiah Fears (21)	Derik Queen (8)	Jeremiah Fears (6)	Ball Arena; 19,533	0–4
5	October 31	@ L.A. Clippers	L 124–126	Jordan Poole (30)	Yves Missi (9)	Jeremiah Fears (8)	Intuit Dome; 16,083	0–5

November: 3–14 (home: 2–7; road: 1–7)

Game	Date	Team	Score	High points	High rebounds	High assists	Location Attendance	Record
6	November 2	@ Oklahoma City	L 106–137	Zion Williamson (20)	Zion Williamson (9)	Zion Williamson (6)	Paycom Center; 18,203	0–6
7	November 4	Charlotte	W 116–112	Trey Murphy III (21)	Derik Queen (5)	Derik Queen (7)	Smoothie King Center; 15,555	1–6
8	November 5	@ Dallas	W 101–99	Saddiq Bey (22)	Bey, Murphy III (9)	Trey Murphy III (5)	American Airlines Center; 18,925	2–6
9	November 8	@ San Antonio	L 119–126	Trey Murphy III (41)	Trey Murphy III (9)	Derik Queen (7)	Frost Bank Center; 18,611	2–7
10	November 10	@ Phoenix	L 98–121	Trey Murphy III (21)	Trey Murphy III (10)	Alvarado, Jones, Murphy III (4)	Mortgage Matchup Center; 17,071	2–8
11	November 12	Portland	L 117–125	Saddiq Bey (25)	Derik Queen (7)	Bey, Murphy III (5)	Smoothie King Center; 15,896	2–9
12	November 14	L.A. Lakers	L 104–118	Trey Murphy III (35)	Derik Queen (10)	Saddiq Bey (7)	Smoothie King Center; 18,102	2–10
13	November 16	Golden State	L 106–124	Trey Murphy III (20)	Trey Murphy III (8)	Derik Queen (6)	Smoothie King Center; 18,373	2–11
14	November 17	Oklahoma City	L 109–126	Jeremiah Fears (24)	Derik Queen (8)	Jordan Hawkins (6)	Smoothie King Center; 13,757	2–12
15	November 19	Denver	L 118–125	Derik Queen (30)	Derik Queen (9)	Zion Williamson (5)	Smoothie King Center; 16,484	2–13
16	November 21	@ Dallas	L 115–118	Trey Murphy III (25)	Herbert Jones (9)	Derik Queen (11)	American Airlines Center; 18,506	2–14
17	November 22	Atlanta	L 98–115	Derik Queen (20)	Saddiq Bey (11)	Saddiq Bey (5)	Smoothie King Center; 19,397	2–15
18	November 24	Chicago	W 143–130	Zion Williamson (29)	Yves Missi (14)	Jose Alvarado (8)	Smoothie King Center; 16,690	3–15
19	November 26	Memphis	L 128–133	Jose Alvarado (24)	Saddiq Bey (10)	Derik Queen (9)	Smoothie King Center; 17,333	3–16
20	November 29	@ Golden State	L 96–104	Zion Williamson (25)	Yves Missi (10)	Alvarado, Williamson (4)	Chase Center; 18,064	3–17
21	November 30	@ L.A. Lakers	L 121–133	Bryce McGowens (23)	Saddiq Bey (11)	Bryce McGowens (5)	Crypto.com Arena; 18,824	3–18

December: 5–9 (home: 4–6; road: 1–3)

Game	Date	Team	Score	High points	High rebounds	High assists	Location Attendance	Record
22	December 2	Minnesota	L 142–149 (OT)	Trey Murphy III (33)	Trey Murphy III (15)	Derik Queen (6)	Smoothie King Center; 12,770	3–19
23	December 4	Minnesota	L 116–125	Trey Murphy III (21)	Fears, Murphy III (7)	Trey Murphy III (8)	Smoothie King Center; 16,459	3–20
24	December 6	@ Brooklyn	L 101–119	Trey Murphy III (23)	Derik Queen (9)	Jose Alvarado (6)	Barclays Center; 17,055	3–21
25	December 8	San Antonio	L 132–135	Derik Queen (33)	Derik Queen (10)	Derik Queen (10)	Smoothie King Center; 15,783	3–22
26	December 11	Portland	W 143–120	Trey Murphy III (24)	Bey, Missi (8)	Jose Alvarado (9)	Smoothie King Center; 13,448	4–22
27	December 15	@ Chicago	W 114–104	Fears, Murphy III (20)	Trey Murphy III (10)	Derik Queen (6)	United Center; 18,372	5–22
28	December 18	Houston	W 133–128 (OT)	Saddiq Bey (29)	Derik Queen (12)	Jose Alvarado (6)	Smoothie King Center; 16,766	6–22
29	December 20	Indiana	W 128–109	Zion Williamson (29)	Derik Queen (10)	Jordan Poole (6)	Smoothie King Center; 16,434	7–22
30	December 22	Dallas	W 119–113	Zion Williamson (24)	Derik Queen (8)	Derik Queen (6)	Smoothie King Center; 16,978	8–22
31	December 23	@ Cleveland	L 118–141	Zion Williamson (26)	McGowens, Queen (7)	Tied (5)	Rocket Arena; 19,432	8–23
32	December 26	Phoenix	L 108–115	Zion Williamson (20)	Zion Williamson (8)	Zion Williamson (6)	Smoothie King Center; 16,643	8–24
33	December 27	Phoenix	L 114–123	Trey Murphy III (24)	Derik Queen (11)	Tied (3)	Smoothie King Center; 16,914	8–25
34	December 29	New York	L 125–130	Zion Williamson (32)	Looney, Queen (9)	Bey, Queen (6)	Smoothie King Center; 17,041	8–26
35	December 31	@ Chicago	L 118–134	Zion Williamson (31)	Kevon Looney (10)	Trey Murphy III (5)	United Center; 20,527	8–27

January: 5–11 (home: 2–4; road: 3–7)

Game	Date	Team	Score	High points	High rebounds	High assists	Location Attendance	Record
36	January 2	Portland	L 109–122	Zion Williamson (35)	Kevon Looney (12)	Jordan Poole (6)	Smoothie King Center; 16,812	8–28
37	January 4	@ Miami	L 106–125	Trey Murphy III (27)	Trey Murphy III (8)	Jordan Poole (8)	Kaseya Center; 19,600	8–29
38	January 6	L.A. Lakers	L 103–108	Trey Murphy III (42)	Derik Queen (13)	Derik Queen (8)	Smoothie King Center; 18,227	8–30
39	January 7	@ Atlanta	L 100–117	Zion Williamson (22)	Derik Queen (10)	Peavy, Williamson (6)	State Farm Arena; 15,993	8–31
40	January 9	@ Washington	W 128–107	Trey Murphy III (35)	Derik Queen (16)	Derik Queen (12)	Capital One Arena; 16,563	9–31
41	January 11	@ Orlando	L 118–128	Zion Williamson (22)	Trey Murphy III (7)	Murphy III, Queen (6)	Kia Center; 19,059	9–32
42	January 13	Denver	L 116–122	Trey Murphy III (31)	Derik Queen (13)	Derik Queen (5)	Smoothie King Center; 17,309	9–33
43	January 14	Brooklyn	W 116–113	Trey Murphy III (34)	Yves Missi (12)	Trey Murphy III (5)	Smoothie King Center; 16,201	10–33
44	January 16	@ Indiana	L 119–127	Zion Williamson (27)	Derik Queen (12)	Zion Williamson (7)	Gainbridge Fieldhouse; 16,753	10–34
45	January 18	@ Houston	L 110–119	Trey Murphy III (21)	Missi, Williamson (6)	Derik Queen (5)	Toyota Center; 18,055	10–35
46	January 21	Detroit	L 104–112	Saddiq Bey (20)	Looney, Peavy (7)	Derik Queen (8)	Smoothie King Center; 15,502	10–36
47	January 23	@ Memphis	W 133–127	Saddiq Bey (36)	Zion Williamson (11)	Jones, Queen (5)	FedExForum; 14,174	11–36
48	January 25	@ San Antonio	W 104–95	Bey, Williamson (24)	Yves Missi (14)	Trey Murphy III (9)	Frost Bank Center; 18,363	12–36
49	January 27	@ Oklahoma City	L 95–104	Zion Williamson (21)	Saddiq Bey (13)	Tied (5)	Paycom Center; 18,203	12–37
50	January 30	Memphis	W 114–106	Bey, Queen (22)	Derik Queen (9)	Derik Queen (7)	Smoothie King Center; 16,446	13–37
51	January 31	@ Philadelphia	L 114–124	Saddiq Bey (34)	Trey Murphy III (9)	Herbert Jones (5)	Xfinity Mobile Arena; 20,096	13–38

February: 6–4 (home: 3–2; road: 3–2)

Game	Date	Team	Score	High points	High rebounds	High assists	Location Attendance	Record
52	February 2	@ Charlotte	L 95–102	Trey Murphy III (27)	Zion Williamson (11)	Saddiq Bey (5)	Spectrum Center; 17,263	13–39
53	February 4	@ Milwaukee	L 137–141 (OT)	Trey Murphy III (44)	Yves Missi (7)	Zion Williamson (8)	Fiserv Forum; 14,343	13–40
54	February 6	@ Minnesota	W 119–115	Saddiq Bey (30)	Saddiq Bey (9)	Tied (5)	Target Center; 18,978	14–40
55	February 9	Sacramento	W 120–94	Trey Murphy III (21)	Karlo Matković (9)	Trey Murphy III (7)	Smoothie King Center; 16,633	15–40
56	February 11	Miami	L 111–123	Zion Williamson (25)	Jeremiah Fears (10)	Jeremiah Fears (8)	Smoothie King Center; 16,444	15–41
All-Star Game
57	February 20	Milwaukee	L 118–139	Zion Williamson (32)	Derik Queen (9)	Jeremiah Fears (5)	Smoothie King Center; 15,714	15–42
58	February 21	Philadelphia	W 126–111	Jordan Poole (23)	DeAndre Jordan (15)	Zion Williamson (8)	Smoothie King Center; 16,426	16–42
59	February 24	Golden State	W 113–109	Zion Williamson (26)	Jordan, Matković (8)	Jeremiah Fears (5)	Smoothie King Center; 16,481	17–42
60	February 26	@ Utah	W 129–118	Saddiq Bey (42)	Jordan, Queen (7)	Dejounte Murray (9)	Delta Center; 18,186	18–42
61	February 28	@ Utah	W 115–105	Saddiq Bey (24)	Jeremiah Fears (11)	Herbert Jones (7)	Delta Center; 18,186	19–42

March: 6–8 (home: 5–1; road: 1–7)

Game	Date	Team	Score	High points	High rebounds	High assists	Location Attendance	Record
62	March 1	@ L.A. Clippers	L 117–137	Jeremiah Fears (28)	Yves Missi (8)	Dejounte Murray (5)	Intuit Dome; 17,003	19–43
63	March 3	@ L.A. Lakers	L 101–110	Zion Williamson (24)	Murphy III, Murray (8)	Dejounte Murray (8)	Crypto.com Arena; 18,248	19–44
64	March 5	@ Sacramento	W 133–123	Zion Williamson (23)	Tied (9)	Jeremiah Fears (6)	Golden 1 Center; 15,350	20–44
65	March 6	@ Phoenix	L 116–118	Trey Murphy III (22)	Zion Williamson (10)	Dejounte Murray (5)	Mortgage Matchup Center; 17,071	20–45
66	March 8	Washington	W 138–118	Trey Murphy III (24)	Saddiq Bey (10)	Jeremiah Fears (7)	Smoothie King Center; 16,698	21–45
67	March 11	Toronto	W 122–111	Trey Murphy III (28)	Yves Missi (10)	Dejounte Murray (6)	Smoothie King Center; 16,568	22–45
68	March 13	@ Houston	L 105–107	Dejounte Murray (35)	Herbert Jones (9)	Trey Murphy III (7)	Toyota Center; 18,055	22–46
69	March 16	Dallas	W 129–111	Zion Williamson (27)	Matković, Missi (10)	Trey Murphy III (7)	Smoothie King Center; 16,787	23–46
70	March 18	L.A. Clippers	W 124–109	Saddiq Bey (25)	Karlo Matković (8)	Dejounte Murray (11)	Smoothie King Center; 16,546	24–46
71	March 19	L.A. Clippers	W 105–99	Trey Murphy III (27)	Yves Missi (11)	Saddiq Bey (6)	Smoothie King Center; 15,395	25–46
72	March 21	Cleveland	L 106–111	Zion Williamson (25)	Yves Missi (10)	Dejounte Murray (9)	Smoothie King Center; 16,987	25–47
73	March 24	@ New York	L 116–121	Zion Williamson (22)	Trey Murphy III (6)	Dejounte Murray (12)	Madison Square Garden; 19,812	25–48
74	March 26	@ Detroit	L 108–129	Zion Williamson (21)	Derik Queen (11)	Jeremiah Fears (6)	Little Caesars Arena; 18,940	25–49
75	March 27	@ Toronto	L 106–119	Zion Williamson (22)	Derik Queen (8)	Jordan Poole (6)	Scotiabank Arena; 19,027	25–50
76	March 29	Houston	L 102–134	Dejounte Murray (19)	Saddiq Bey (7)	Dejounte Murray (6)	Smoothie King Center; 16,758	25–51

April: 1–5 (home: 1–1; road: 0–4)

Game	Date	Team	Score	High points	High rebounds	High assists	Location Attendance	Record
77	April 2	@ Portland	L 106–118	Jeremiah Fears (21)	Murphy III, Murray (8)	Derik Queen (7)	Moda Center; 16,877	25–52
78	April 3	@ Sacramento	L 113–117	Jeremiah Fears (28)	Jeremiah Fears (8)	Jeremiah Fears (6)	Golden 1 Center; 15,422	25–53
79	April 5	Orlando	L 108–112	Saddiq Bey (32)	Yves Missi (13)	Jeremiah Fears (7)	Smoothie King Center; 16,629	25–54
80	April 7	Utah	W 156–137	Jeremiah Fears (40)	Looney, Queen (12)	Derik Queen (7)	Smoothie King Center; 15,971	26–54
81	April 10	@ Boston	L 118–144	Jeremiah Fears (36)	Josh Oduro (12)	Jeremiah Fears (6)	TD Garden; 19,156	26–55
82	April 12	@ Minnesota	L 126–132	Jeremiah Fears (36)	Derik Queen (22)	Jeremiah Fears (5)	Target Center; 18,978	26–56

2025–26 season schedule

=== NBA Cup ===
==== West Group B ====
Pos	Team	Pld	W	L	PF	PA	PD	Qualification
1	Los Angeles Lakers	4	4	0	499	453	+46	Advanced to knockout rounds
2	Memphis Grizzlies	4	3	1	464	450	+14	
3	Los Angeles Clippers	4	2	2	465	485	−20	
4	Dallas Mavericks	4	1	3	455	476	−21	
5	New Orleans Pelicans	4	0	4	465	484	−19	

Source: NBA

== Player statistics ==
Legend
GP	Games played	GS	Games started	MPG	Minutes per game
FG%	Field-goal percentage	3P%	3-point field-goal percentage	FT%	Free-throw percentage
RPG	Rebounds per game	APG	Assists per game	SPG	Steals per game
BPG	Blocks per game	PPG	Points per game

=== Regular season ===
New Orleans Pelicans statistics
Player	GP	GS	MPG	FG%	3P%	FT%	RPG	APG	SPG	BPG	PPG
Trey Alexander	9	0	12.3	.514	.500	.600	1.2	1.0	.7	.2	5.2
Jose Alvarado^{†}	41	0	21.9	.418	.363	.833	2.8	3.1	.9	.1	7.9
Saddiq Bey	72	64	31.2	.451	.367	.841	5.6	2.5	.9	.1	17.7
Hunter Dickinson	5	0	8.4	.357	.000	1.000	1.0	.4	.2	.4	2.4
Jeremiah Fears	82	49	25.8	.434	.330	.789	3.7	3.4	1.2	.4	14.3
Jordan Hawkins	51	1	13.6	.366	.348	.852	1.7	.8	.3	.2	5.1
Herbert Jones	56	56	28.4	.383	.309	.806	3.4	2.8	1.6	.5	8.9
DeAndre Jordan	12	7	16.6	.656		.647	6.3	.9	.3	.8	4.4
Kevon Looney	21	8	14.7	.417	.154	.700	5.6	1.6	.4	.5	2.8
Karlo Matković	62	2	14.7	.604	.422	.732	3.7	.8	.4	.9	5.7
Bryce McGowens	42	13	21.0	.481	.409	.779	2.1	1.5	.6	.2	8.1
Yves Missi	66	14	19.7	.544	.000	.559	5.8	1.3	.3	1.5	5.7
Trey Murphy III	66	66	35.5	.470	.379	.886	5.7	3.8	1.5	.4	21.5
Dejounte Murray	14	14	27.8	.484	.306	.867	5.4	6.4	1.6	.2	16.7
Josh Oduro	3	1	27.3	.647	.000	.500	7.7	1.3	.0	.0	8.3
Micah Peavy	61	4	15.0	.385	.259	.759	1.9	1.0	.7	.1	4.3
Jordan Poole	39	8	23.9	.372	.333	.860	2.0	3.1	.6	.4	13.4
Derik Queen	81	48	25.0	.473	.261	.795	7.1	3.7	1.0	.9	11.7
Zion Williamson	62	55	29.7	.600	.200	.716	5.7	3.2	1.0	.5	21.0

- ^{†} Denotes player spent time with another team in the season. Stats reflect time with the Pelicans only.

== Transactions ==
=== Trades ===
Date	Trade		Ref.
June 17, 2025	To Indiana Pacers: Own 2026 first-round pick	To New Orleans Pelicans: 2025 first-round pick (No. 23) [from Indiana]; Draft rights to Mojave King (2023 No. 47)	
June 25, 2025	To Atlanta Hawks: Draft rights to Asa Newell (No. 23); 2026 first-round pick (from New Orleans)	To New Orleans Pelicans: Draft rights to Derik Queen (No. 13)	
July 6, 2025	Three-team trade		
July 6, 2025	To New Orleans Pelicans: Saddiq Bey; Jordan Poole; Draft rights to Micah Peavy (No. 40)	To Houston Rockets: 2026 second-round pick (from Chicago); 2029 second-round pick (from Sacramento); Draft rights to Mojave King (2023 No. 47)	
July 6, 2025	To Washington Wizards: CJ McCollum; Kelly Olynyk; Cam Whitmore; 2027 second-round pick (from Chicago)		
February 5, 2026	To New York Knicks: Jose Alvarado; Draft rights to Latavious Williams (2010 No. 48)	To New Orleans Pelicans: Dalen Terry; 2026 second-round pick (from New York); 2027 second-round pick (from New York); Cash considerations	

=== Free agency ===
==== Re-signed ====
Player	Signed	Ref.

==== Additions ====
Date	Player	Reason	Former Team	Ref.
July 7, 2025	(United States) Kevon Looney	Free Agency	Golden State Warriors	
October 24, 2025	(United States) DeAndre Jordan	Free Agency	Denver Nuggets	

==== Subtractions ====
Player	Reason	New Team	Ref.
