= Moussa Cissé (basketball) =

Guinean basketball player (born 2002)

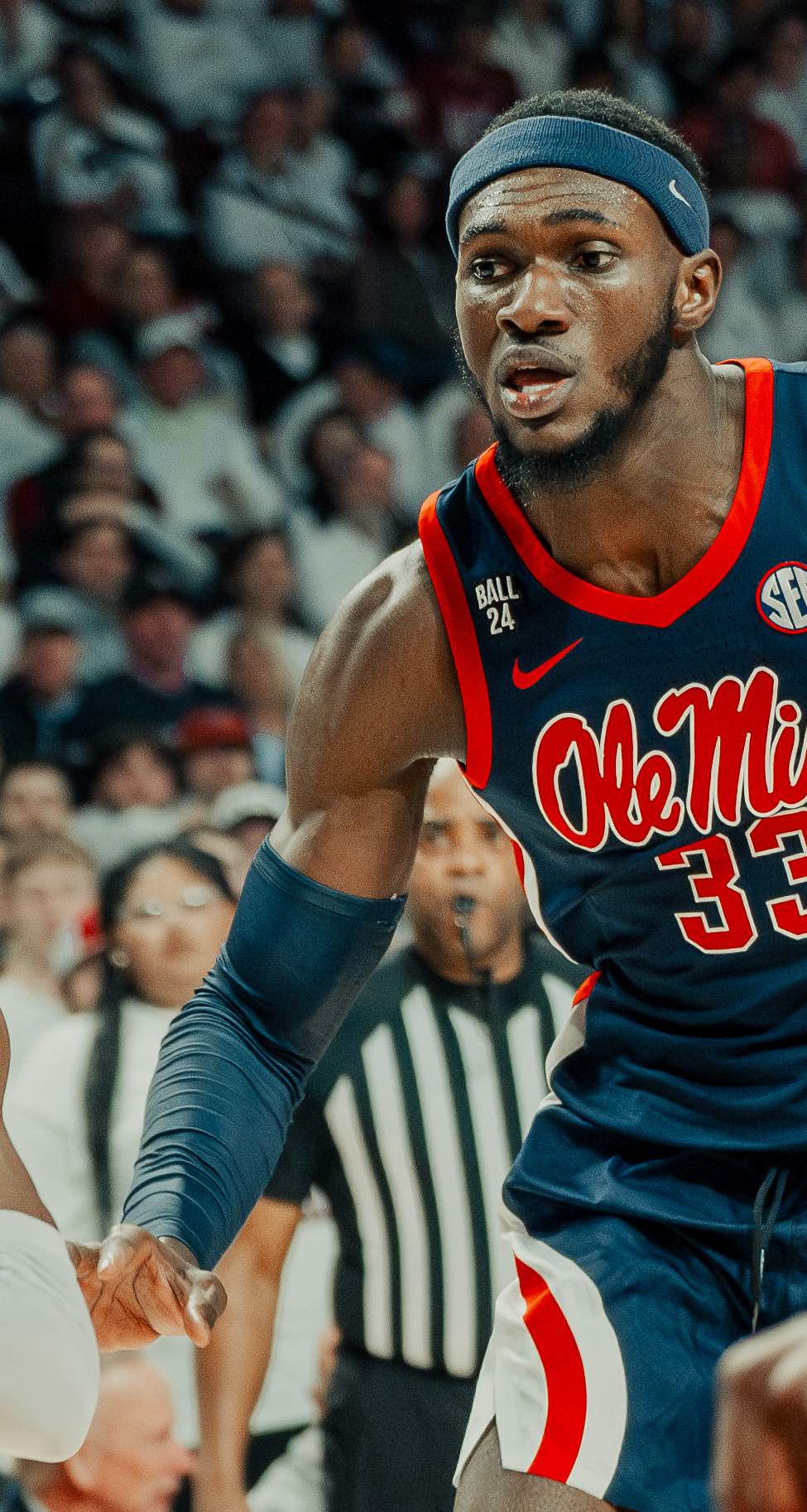
- Cissé with Ole Miss in 2024

No. 30 – Dallas Mavericks
- Position: Center
- League: NBA

Personal information
- Born: 10 September 2002 (age 24) Conakry, Guinea
- Listed height: 6 ft 11 in (2.11 m)
- Listed weight: 220 lb (100 kg)

Career information
- High school: St. Benedict's Prep (Newark, New Jersey); Christ the King (Queens, New York); Lausanne Collegiate School (Memphis, Tennessee)
- College: Memphis (2020–2021); Oklahoma State (2021–2023); Ole Miss (2023–2024); Memphis (2024–2025)
- NBA draft: 2025: undrafted
- Playing career: 2025–present

Career history
- 2025–present: Dallas Mavericks
- 2025–2026: →Texas Legends

Career highlights
- NIT champion (2021); Big 12 co-Defensive Player of the Year (2022); 2× Big 12 All-Defensive Team (2022, 2023); AAC Freshman of the Year (2021); AAC All-Freshman Team (2021); Tennessee Mr. Basketball (2020)
- Stats at NBA.com
- Stats at Basketball Reference

Moussa Cissé (born 10 September 2002) is a Guinean professional basketball player for the Dallas Mavericks of the National Basketball Association (NBA). He played college basketball for the Memphis Tigers, Ole Miss Rebels and the Oklahoma State Cowboys. He was a consensus five-star recruit and one of the best centers in the 2020 class.

== Early life ==
Cissé was born in Conakry, Guinea, and lived there until age 14, when he moved to New York. He had grown up playing soccer. Cissé started playing high school basketball for St. Benedict's Preparatory School in Newark, New Jersey, playing alongside Precious Achiuwa. For two years, he played for Christ the King Regional High School in Queens, where he was teammates with Kofi Cockburn. As a sophomore, Cissé led his team to the Class AA state title game.

For his junior season, he transferred to Lausanne Collegiate School in Memphis, Tennessee. On 25 November 2019, Cissé recorded 31 points, 22 rebounds and 21 blocks, surpassing the Shelby County single-game blocks record held by Mitch Omar since 1976–77. He led Lausanne to the Division II-A state championship, where he was named most valuable player after posting 15 points, 10 rebounds and nine blocks against First Assembly Christian School. As a junior, Cissé averaged 18.4 points, 15.3 rebounds and 9.2 blocks per game, earning Division II-A Tennessee Mr. Basketball honors. He broke Michael Wilson's single-season city record for blocks per game set in 1989–90.

=== Recruiting ===
Cissé was a consensus five-star recruit, according to major recruiting services, and was considered a top 10 player in the 2021 recruiting class. On 27 May 2020, he announced that he would graduate from high school a year early and reclassify to the 2020 class, where he remained a five-star recruit. On 15 July, Cissé committed to play college basketball for Memphis. He was drawn to the program by head coach Penny Hardaway and former high school teammate Precious Achiuwa, who had played for Memphis in the previous season.

College recruiting
Name	Hometown	School	Height	Weight	Commit date
Moussa Cissé; C	Conakry, Guinea	Lausanne Collegiate School (TN)	6 ft 10 in (2.08 m)	220 lb (100 kg)	Jul 15, 2020
Moussa Cissé; C	Recruit ratings: Rivals: 247Sports: ESPN: (92)				
Overall recruit ranking: Rivals: 14 247Sports: 12 ESPN: 24
Note: In many cases, Scout, Rivals, 247Sports, On3, and ESPN may conflict in their listings of height and weight.; In these cases, the average was taken. ESPN grades are on a 100-point scale.; Sources: "Memphis 2020 Basketball Commitments". Rivals.; "2020 Memphis Tigers Recruiting Class". ESPN.; "2020 Team Ranking". Rivals.

== College career ==
At Memphis, Cissé posted his first double-double on 2 December 2020, scoring 14 points and securing 10 rebounds in an 83–54 victory over Arkansas State. In his freshman year, he averaged 6.6 points, 6.3 rebounds and 1.6 blocks per game, earning American Athletic Conference Freshman of the Year honors.

On 6 April 2021, Cissé declared for the 2021 NBA draft while maintaining his college eligibility. He later withdrew from the draft and entered the transfer portal. On 15 July 2021, he transferred to Oklahoma State, choosing the Cowboys over Florida State, Georgia and Kentucky.

In his sophomore year, Cissé was named Big 12 Co-Defensive Player of the Year, alongside Baylor’s Jonathan Tchamwa Tchatchoua and West Virginia’s Gabe Osabuohien. He averaged 7.2 points, 6.5 rebounds and 1.9 blocks per game. As a junior, he was named to the Big 12 All-Defensive Team.

After the 2022–23 season Cissé entered the transfer portal for a second time, later committing to play for Ole Miss over offers from UCLA and Cincinnati.

For the 2024–25 season, Cissé transferred back to Memphis.

== Professional career ==
On 8 July 2025, Cissé was signed by the Dallas Mavericks. On 18 October, the Mavericks converted Cissé's contract into a two-way contract. In Dallas' season finale on 12 April 2026 against the Chicago Bulls, Cissé logged career-highs in points (17) and rebounds (20).

Cisse was re-signed to a two-year contract on July 22, 2026.

== Career statistics ==
Legend
GP	Games played	GS	Games started	MPG	Minutes per game
FG%	Field goal percentage	3P%	3-point field goal percentage	FT%	Free throw percentage
RPG	Rebounds per game	APG	Assists per game	SPG	Steals per game
BPG	Blocks per game	PPG	Points per game	**Bold**	Career high

=== NBA ===
==== Regular season ====
Year	Team	GP	GS	MPG	FG%	3P%	FT%	RPG	APG	SPG	BPG	PPG
2025–26	Dallas	38	1	13.9	.574	—	.469	5.7	.2	.5	1.2	4.5
Career		38	1	13.9	.574	—	.469	5.7	.2	.5	1.2	4.5

=== College ===
Year	Team	GP	GS	MPG	FG%	3P%	FT%	RPG	APG	SPG	BPG	PPG
2020–21	Memphis	28	**28**	18.6	.552	.000	.324	6.3	.5	.3	1.6	6.6
2021–22	Oklahoma State	29	26	20.0	.559	–	**.562**	6.5	.3	.4	**1.9**	**7.2**
2022–23	Oklahoma State	32	20	**22.6**	**.582**	–	.410	**8.0**	**.6**	.3	**1.9**	6.8
2023–24	Ole Miss	26	17	17.5	.558	.000	.263	4.6	.3	**.7**	1.4	4.5
2024–25	Memphis	**35**	16	18.2	.548	.000	.488	6.5	.5	**.7**	1.6	5.7
Career		150	107	19.4	.561	.000	.438	6.5	.4	.5	1.7	6.2
