= Bryce McGowens =

American basketball player (born 2002)

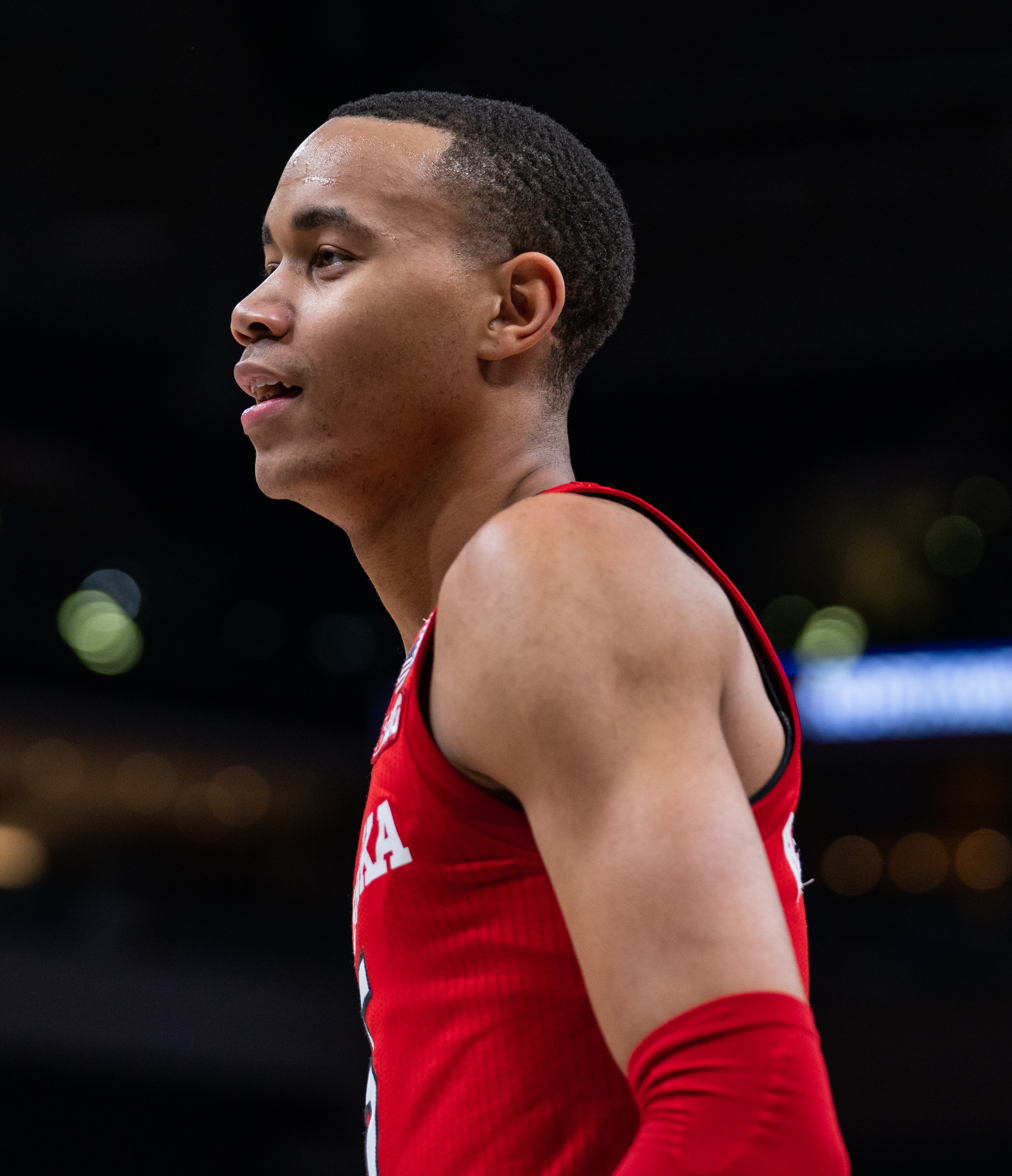
- McGowens with Nebraska in 2022

No. 11 – New Orleans Pelicans
- Position: Shooting guard
- League: NBA

Personal information
- Born: November 8, 2002 (age 23) Pendleton, South Carolina, U.S.
- Listed height: 6 ft 6 in (1.98 m)
- Listed weight: 202 lb (92 kg)

Career information
- High school: Wren (Piedmont, South Carolina); Legacy Early College (Greenville, South Carolina)
- College: Nebraska (2021–2022)
- NBA draft: 2022: 2nd round, 40th overall pick
- Drafted by: Minnesota Timberwolves
- Playing career: 2022–present

Career history
- 2022–2024: Charlotte Hornets
- 2022–2023: →Greensboro Swarm
- 2024–2025: Portland Trail Blazers
- 2024–2025: →Rip City Remix
- 2025–present: New Orleans Pelicans
- 2025–2026: →Birmingham Squadron

Career highlights
- All-NBA G League Second Team (2025); Third-team All-Big Ten (2022); Big Ten All-Freshman Team (2022); South Carolina Mr. Basketball (2021)
- Stats at NBA.com
- Stats at Basketball Reference

Bryce Alexander McGowens (born November 8, 2002) is an American professional basketball player for the New Orleans Pelicans of the National Basketball Association (NBA). He played college basketball for the Nebraska Cornhuskers.

== High school career ==
McGowens played basketball for Wren High School in Piedmont, South Carolina. As a sophomore, he averaged 26.3 points, 3.8 rebounds, and three assists per game, and was named Region 1-4A Player of the Year. He led his team to a Class 4A Upper State runner-up finish. In his junior season, McGowens scored a school-record 65 points in a second-round win at the Class 4A playoffs. He averaged 25.3 points, 6.4 rebounds, and 3.1 assists per game as a junior, leading his team to the Class 4A Upper State championship game and repeating as Region 1-4A Player of the Year. For his senior season, McGowens moved to Legacy Early College in Greenville, South Carolina. As a senior, he averaged 21.6 points, 4.7 rebounds, and 3.1 assists per game, earning South Carolina Gatorade Player of the Year honors. He was selected to the Jordan Brand Classic roster.

=== Recruiting ===
McGowens was considered a five-star recruit by 247Sports and Rivals, and a four-star recruit by ESPN. On February 10, 2020, he announced his commitment to play college basketball for Florida State. On October 8, 2020, McGowens decommitted from the program. On November 13, 2020, he committed to Nebraska, becoming the highest-ranked recruit in program history and its first five-star recruit.

College recruiting
Name	Hometown	School	Height	Weight	Commit date
Bryce McGowens; SG	Pendleton, SC	Legacy Early College (SC)	6 ft 6 in (1.98 m)	175 lb (79 kg)	Nov 13, 2020
Bryce McGowens; SG	Recruit ratings: Rivals: 247Sports: ESPN: (89)				
Overall recruit ranking: Rivals: 29 247Sports: 27 ESPN: 26
Note: In many cases, Scout, Rivals, 247Sports, On3, and ESPN may conflict in their listings of height and weight.; In these cases, the average was taken. ESPN grades are on a 100-point scale.; Sources: "Nebraska 2021 Basketball Commits". Rivals.; "2021 Nebraska Cornhuskers Recruiting Class". ESPN.; "2021 Team Ranking". Rivals.

== College career ==
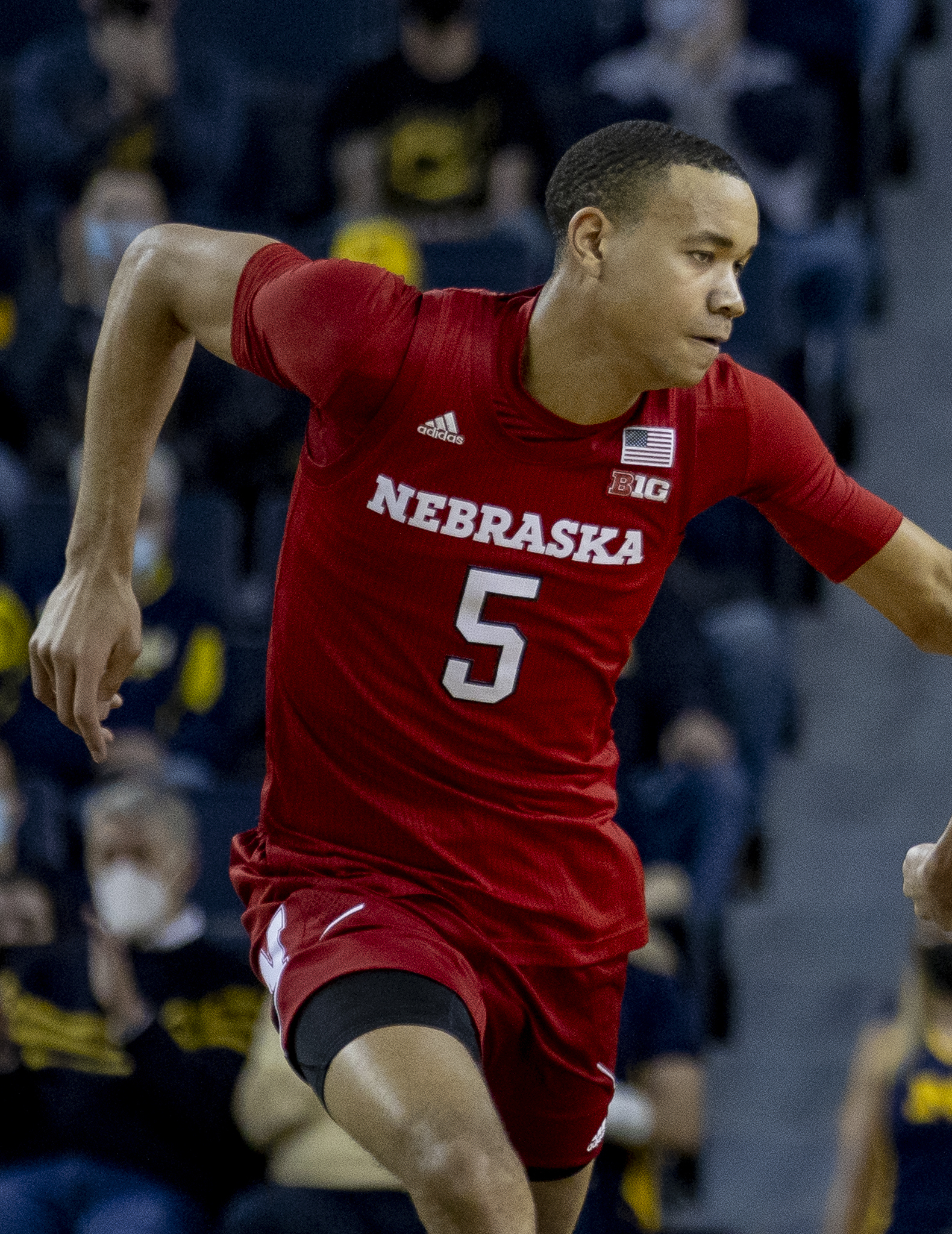
McGowens with Nebraska in 2022

In his college debut, McGowens scored 25 points in a 75–74 loss to Western Illinois on November 9, 2021. On March 1, 2022, he scored 26 points in a 78–70 win against Ohio State but suffered a hand injury that forced him to miss the following game against Wisconsin. McGowens was named third-team All-Big Ten as well as to the All-Freshman Team. He averaged 16.8 points, 5.2 rebounds, and 1.4 assists per game. On March 21, 2022, McGowens declared for the 2022 NBA draft, forgoing his remaining college eligibility.

== Professional career ==
=== Charlotte Hornets / Greensboro Swarm (2022–2024) ===
McGowens was selected with the 40th overall pick by the Minnesota Timberwolves in the 2022 NBA draft before being traded to the Charlotte Hornets. On July 2, 2022, the Hornets announced that they had signed McGowens to a two-way contract. Under the terms of the deal, he split time between the Hornets and their NBA G League affiliate, the Greensboro Swarm. On February 26, 2023, McGowens' deal was converted to a four-year, $7 million contract by the Hornets. McGowens was waived by the Hornets on July 6, 2024.

=== Portland Trail Blazers / Rip City Remix (2024–2025) ===
On July 11, 2024, McGowens signed a two-way contract with the Portland Trail Blazers. In 13 games for Portland during the 2024–25 NBA season, he averaged 1.0 point, 0.2 rebounds, and 0.2 assists in 2.5 minutes per game. On March 26, 2025, while playing for the Rip City Remix, McGowens suffered a season-ending right rib fracture.

=== New Orleans Pelicans / Birmingham Squadron (2025–present) ===
On July 30, 2025, McGowens signed a two-way contract with the New Orleans Pelicans. On February 20, 2026, the Pelicans signed McGowens to a three-year, standard NBA contract worth $6.2 million.

== Career statistics ==
Legend
GP	Games played	GS	Games started	MPG	Minutes per game
FG%	Field goal percentage	3P%	3-point field goal percentage	FT%	Free throw percentage
RPG	Rebounds per game	APG	Assists per game	SPG	Steals per game
BPG	Blocks per game	PPG	Points per game	**Bold**	Career high

=== NBA ===
Year	Team	GP	GS	MPG	FG%	3P%	FT%	RPG	APG	SPG	BPG	PPG
2022–23	Charlotte	46	7	17.1	.396	.325	.750	2.0	1.2	.3	.1	5.3
2023–24	Charlotte	**59**	**14**	14.9	.439	.333	.776	1.7	.9	.4	**.2**	5.1
2024–25	Portland	13	0	2.5	.286	.000	**.833**	.2	.2	.1	.0	1.0
2025–26	New Orleans	42	13	**21.0**	**.481**	**.409**	.779	**2.1**	**1.5**	**.6**	**.2**	**8.1**
Career		160	34	16.1	.438	.351	.771	1.8	1.1	.4	.2	5.6

=== College ===
Year	Team	GP	GS	MPG	FG%	3P%	FT%	RPG	APG	SPG	BPG	PPG
2021–22	Nebraska	31	31	33.3	.403	.274	.831	5.2	1.4	.7	.3	16.8

== Personal life ==
McGowens' older brother, Trey, played college basketball for Pittsburgh before transferring to Nebraska. His father, Bobby, was a two-sport athlete in basketball and football at South Carolina State after playing football at Clemson. McGowens' mother, Pam, played basketball for Western Carolina. Both of his parents have coached high school basketball.
