= Miles Kelly =

American basketball player (born 2003)

No. 99 – Santa Cruz Warriors
- Position: Shooting guard / point guard
- League: NBA G League

Personal information
- Born: January 26, 2003 (age 23) Stone Mountain, Georgia, U.S.
- Listed height: 6 ft 4 in (1.93 m)
- Listed weight: 190 lb (86 kg)

Career information
- High school: Parkview (Lilburn, Georgia); Hargrave Military Academy (Chatham, Virginia)
- College: Georgia Tech (2021–2024); Auburn (2024–2025)
- NBA draft: 2025: undrafted
- Playing career: 2025–present

Career history
- 2025–2026: Dallas Mavericks
- 2025–2026: →Texas Legends
- 2026–present: Santa Cruz Warriors
- Stats at NBA.com
- Stats at Basketball Reference

Miles Kelly (born January 26, 2003) is an American professional basketball player for the Santa Cruz Warriors of the NBA G League. He played college basketball for the Georgia Tech Yellow Jackets and Auburn Tigers.

== High school career ==
Coming out of high school, Kelly was rated as a four-star recruit and committed to playing college basketball for Georgia Tech over other schools such as NC State, Miami (Florida), Texas A&M, and Wake Forest.

== College career ==
As a freshman in 2021–22, Kelly appeared in 30 games with one start, where he averaged 4.5 points and 1.4 rebounds per game for Georgia Tech. On February 28, 2023, he dropped 30 points versus Syracuse. During the 2022–23 season, Kelly averaged 14.4 points per game. On February 10, 2024, he dropped a career-high 36 points versus Louisville. During the 2023–24 season, Kelly averaged 13.9 points, 5.5 rebounds, and 1.8 assists per game, earning all-ACC honorable mention. After the season, he entered his name into the NCAA transfer portal.

Kelly transferred to play for the Auburn Tigers. In his team debut on November 6, 2024, he put up 21 points on seven made threes in a season-opening win over Vermont. On January 25, 2025, Kelly hit a game-winning three against Tennessee. On February 8, he totaled 22 points against Florida. On March 1, Kelly scored 30 points while making nine threes in a win over Kentucky in Rupp Arena.

== Professional career ==
After not being selected in the 2025 NBA draft, Kelly signed a two-way contract with the Dallas Mavericks on July 5, 2025. He made 14 appearances for Dallas, averaging 3.1 points, 1.7 rebounds, and 0.9 assists. On March 1, 2026, Kelly was waived by the Mavericks.

On June 30, 2026, it was announced that Kelly would be participating in the 2026 NBA Summer League with the San Antonio Spurs.

On 27 September, 2026, Kelly signed an exhibit 10-day contract with the Golden State Warriors.

== Career statistics ==
Legend
GP	Games played	GS	Games started	MPG	Minutes per game
FG%	Field goal percentage	3P%	3-point field goal percentage	FT%	Free throw percentage
RPG	Rebounds per game	APG	Assists per game	SPG	Steals per game
BPG	Blocks per game	PPG	Points per game	**Bold**	Career high

=== NBA ===
==== Regular season ====
Year	Team	GP	GS	MPG	FG%	3P%	FT%	RPG	APG	SPG	BPG	PPG
2025–26	Dallas	14	0	9.6	.364	.303	1.000	1.7	.9	.3	.1	3.1
Career		14	0	9.6	.364	.303	1.000	1.7	.9	.3	.1	3.1

=== College ===
Year	Team	GP	GS	MPG	FG%	3P%	FT%	RPG	APG	SPG	BPG	PPG
2021–22	Georgia Tech	30	1	14.6	.407	.347	.722	1.4	.5	.5	.1	4.5
2022–23	Georgia Tech	33	27	**32.4**	**.410**	**.379**	.898	3.4	1.3	.7	.1	**14.4**
2023–24	Georgia Tech	32	32	31.8	.369	.321	.733	**5.5**	**1.8**	.8	.3	13.9
2024–25	Auburn	**38**	**36**	28.2	.406	.378	**.909**	3.7	1.1	**1.0**	**.4**	11.3
Career		133	96	27.0	.396	.359	.819	3.5	1.2	.8	.2	11.2
