= Derik Queen =

American basketball player (born 2004)

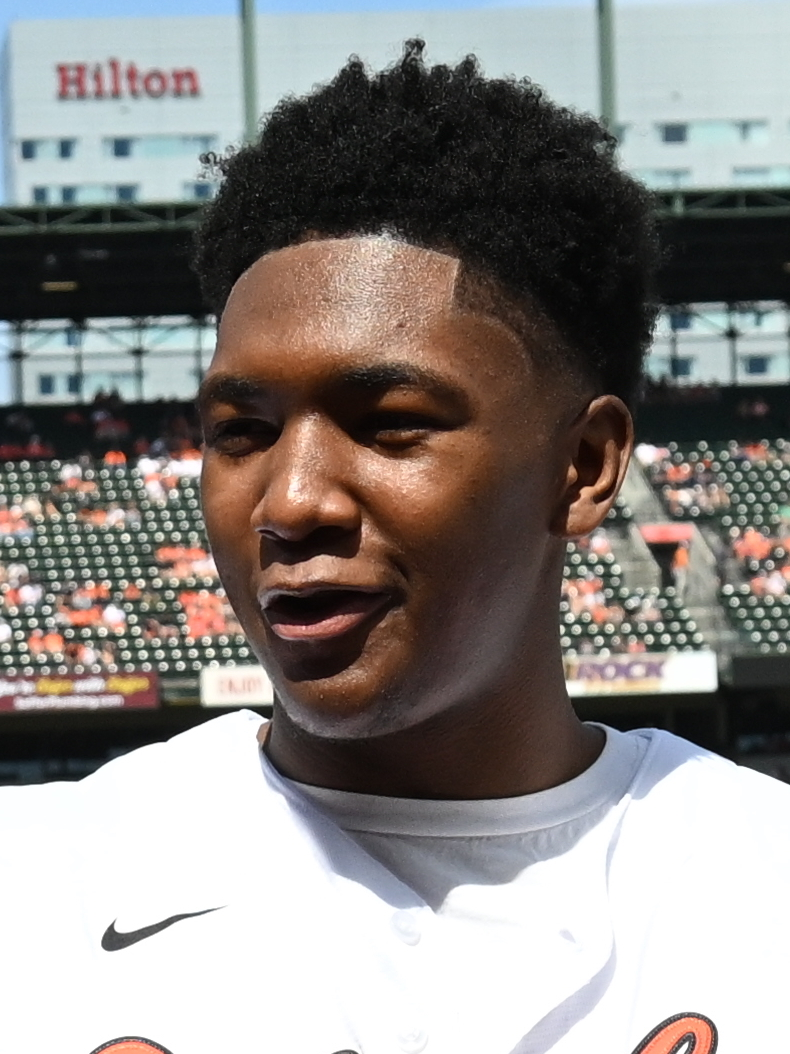
- Queen at Camden Yards in 2025

No. 22 – New Orleans Pelicans
- Position: Center
- League: NBA

Personal information
- Born: December 27, 2004 (age 21) Baltimore, Maryland, U.S.
- Listed height: 6 ft 11 in (2.11 m)
- Listed weight: 225 lb (102 kg)

Career information
- High school: St. Frances Academy (Baltimore, Maryland); Montverde Academy (Montverde, Florida)
- College: Maryland (2024–2025)
- NBA draft: 2025: 1st round, 13th overall pick
- Drafted by: Atlanta Hawks
- Playing career: 2025–present

Career history
- 2025–present: New Orleans Pelicans

Career highlights
- NBA All-Rookie Second Team (2026); First-team All-Big Ten (2025); Big Ten Freshman of the Year (2025); Big Ten All-Freshman Team (2025); McDonald's All-American Game Co-MVP (2024); Jordan Brand Classic (2024)
- Stats at NBA.com
- Stats at Basketball Reference

Derik Emanuel Queen (born December 27, 2004) is an American professional basketball player for the New Orleans Pelicans of the National Basketball Association (NBA). He played college basketball for the Maryland Terrapins. He was a consensus five-star recruit and one of the top players in the 2024 class. He was drafted 13th overall by the Atlanta Hawks in the 2025 NBA draft, but was traded to the Pelicans on draft night.

== High school career ==
As a freshman, Queen attended Saint Frances Academy in his native Baltimore. On March 12, 2021, he scored a season-high 56 points in a 99–55 win over Annapolis Area Christian School. Queen averaged 14 points, eight rebounds, four assists and two blocks per game during the COVID-shortened season, leading the Panthers to a 15–1 record and an appearance in the Baltimore Catholic League title game. He was named the MaxPreps National Freshman of the Year for his performance. Following the season, Queen transferred to Montverde Academy in Montverde, Florida. He received limited playing time as a sophomore due to the amount of talent on the team, which won its second straight GEICO Nationals title with a 60–49 win over Link Academy.

On December 9, 2022, Queen recorded his first double-double at Montverde, contributing 11 points and 11 rebounds during a 78–51 win over Oak Hill Academy at the Bob Kirk Invitational Showcase. On December 21, he tallied 13 points and a season-high 16 rebounds in a 79–45 win over Milton High School at the Iolani Classic. On January 5, 2023, Queen scored a season-high 34 points and grabbed 11 rebounds in a 66–62 win over fellow national powerhouse Sunrise Christian Academy at the LaPorte Invitational. The next day, he posted 24 points and 10 rebounds in a 66–61 victory over Wasatch Academy. On February 3, 2023, Queen recorded 24 points and 13 rebounds to guide second-ranked Montverde to an 85–48 win over top-ranked Link Academy in a highly anticipated matchup between the two top-ranked teams in the country. However, Montverde suffered a 46–45 upset defeat to Sunrise Christian in the quarterfinals of the 2023 GEICO Nationals, which the ESPNU crew described as "the biggest upset in the 14-year history of the GEICO Nationals." Queen had 10 points and six rebounds in the loss, which ended their season with a record of 23–3. As a junior, he averaged 11.8 points, 6.7 rebounds, and 2.2 assists per game on 61 percent shooting, receiving a MaxPreps Junior All-American honorable mention.

On November 25, 2023, Queen recorded 24 points and eight rebounds to lead Montverde to a 103–74 win over Duncanville High School. In their next game, an 86–69 victory over IMG Academy, he posted 25 points and 13 rebounds. On December 8, Queen tallied 20 points and nine rebounds in a 71–59 win over Link Academy.

Queen also played for Team Thrill UAA in off-season competitions. In 2023, he led them to an Under Armour Association (UAA) 17U spring championship after recording 22 points, 15 rebounds and five blocks in their 69–49 title game victory over West Coast Elite.

=== Recruiting ===
Queen was a consensus five-star recruit and one of the top players in the 2024 class, according to major recruiting services. On October 27, 2023, he officially narrowed his list of schools down to four finalists: Maryland, Indiana, Kansas and Houston. On February 21, 2024, Queen verbally committed to playing college basketball for Maryland. It was one of the first programs to start recruiting Queen, having offered him a scholarship during the summer before his freshman year.

College recruiting
| Name | Hometown | School | Height | Weight | Commit date |
|---|---|---|---|---|---|
| Derik Queen; C | Baltimore, MD | Montverde Academy (FL) | 6 ft 10 in (2.08 m) | 240 lb (110 kg) | Feb 21, 2024 |
| Derik Queen; C | Recruit ratings: Rivals: 247Sports: On3: ESPN: (93) | | | | |
Overall recruit ranking: Rivals: 18 247Sports: 12 On3: 26 ESPN: 8
Note: In many cases, Scout, Rivals, 247Sports, On3, and ESPN may conflict in their listings of height and weight.; In these cases, the average was taken. ESPN grades are on a 100-point scale.; Sources: "Maryland 2024 Basketball Commitments". Rivals.; "2024 Maryland Terrapins Recruiting Class". ESPN.; "2024 Team Ranking". Rivals.

== College career ==
Queen enrolled at the University of Maryland in 2024. Following his freshman season, he was a first-team All-Big Ten selection by the coaches and won the Big Ten Freshman of the Year. In the 2025 Big Ten Tournament, Queen scored 31 points against the eventual Big Ten champion Michigan Wolverines in the semifinal. It was the most points ever scored in the tournament by a Maryland freshman and earned him an All-Tournament Team selection.

In the second round of the subsequent NCAA tournament, Queen scored a fadeaway jump shot at the buzzer to lift Maryland above Colorado State, 72–71. It was his first game-winning shot at any level.

== Professional career ==
=== New Orleans Pelicans (2025–present) ===
Queen was drafted with the 13th overall pick in the 2025 NBA draft by the Atlanta Hawks, but was traded the same day to the New Orleans Pelicans for Asa Newell and a future first-round draft pick. The pick would turn out to be the 8th pick in the 2026 NBA Draft, where the Hawks would draft Kingston Flemings.

On July 5, 2025, Queen signed his rookie contract. In a July 15 NBA Summer League game, Queen tore a scapholunate ligament in his left wrist. He had surgery on July 18 and was expected to miss three months of action.

On November 20, 2025, Queen put up a career-high 30 points, along with nine rebounds, four assists, two steals, and two blocks in a 125–118 loss to the Denver Nuggets. On December 8, Queen put up a triple-double with 33 points, 10 rebounds, and 10 assists, alongside four blocks in a 135–132 loss to the San Antonio Spurs. He also became the first rookie center to put up a 30-point triple-double in NBA history. On the final game of the Pelicans' season on April 13, 2026, he put up 30 points and a career-high 22 rebounds in a 132–126 loss to the Minnesota Timberwolves. He finished the season with 11.7 points, 7.1 rebounds, and 3.7 assists per 25 minutes in 81 games.

== Career statistics ==
Legend
| GP | Games played | GS | Games started | MPG | Minutes per game |
| FG% | Field goal percentage | 3P% | 3-point field goal percentage | FT% | Free throw percentage |
| RPG | Rebounds per game | APG | Assists per game | SPG | Steals per game |
| BPG | Blocks per game | PPG | Points per game | **Bold** | Career high |

=== NBA ===
| Year | Team | GP | GS | MPG | FG% | 3P% | FT% | RPG | APG | SPG | BPG | PPG |
|---|---|---|---|---|---|---|---|---|---|---|---|---|
| 2025–26 | New Orleans | 81 | 48 | 25 | .473 | .261 | .795 | 7.1 | 3.7 | 1.0 | .9 | 11.7 |
| Career | | 81 | 48 | 25 | .473 | .261 | .795 | 7.1 | 3.7 | 1.0 | .9 | 11.7 |

=== College ===
| Year | Team | GP | GS | MPG | FG% | 3P% | FT% | RPG | APG | SPG | BPG | PPG |
|---|---|---|---|---|---|---|---|---|---|---|---|---|
| 2024–25 | Maryland | 36 | 36 | 30.4 | .526 | .200 | .766 | 9.0 | 1.9 | 1.1 | 1.1 | 16.5 |
