= Jeremiah Fears =

American basketball player (born 2006)

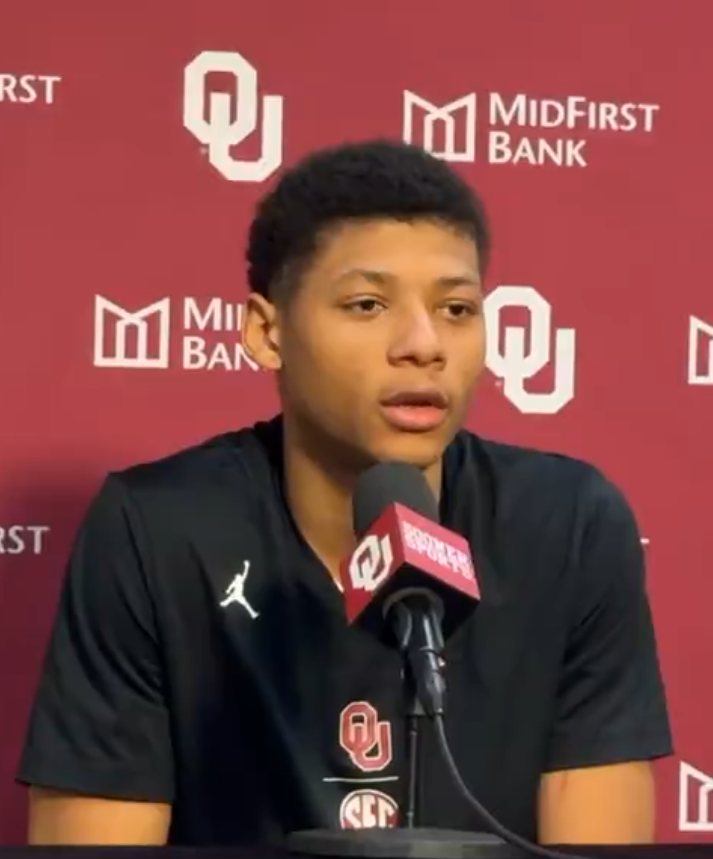

No. 0 – New Orleans Pelicans
- Position: Point guard / shooting guard
- League: NBA

Personal information
- Born: October 14, 2006 (age 20) Chicago, Illinois, U.S.
- Listed height: 6 ft 3 in (1.91 m)
- Listed weight: 188 lb (85 kg)

Career information
- High school: Joliet West (Joliet, Illinois); Arizona Compass Prep (Chandler, Arizona)
- College: Oklahoma (2024–2025)
- NBA draft: 2025: 1st round, 7th overall pick
- Drafted by: New Orleans Pelicans
- Playing career: 2025–present

Career history
- 2025–present: New Orleans Pelicans

Career highlights
- NBA All-Rookie Second Team (2026); SEC All-Freshman Team (2025)
- Stats at NBA.com
- Stats at Basketball Reference
Medals
Men's basketball
Representing the United States
FIBA Under-18 AmeriCup
Gold medal – first place	2024 Argentina	Team

Jeremiah Fears (born October 14, 2006) is an American professional basketball player for the New Orleans Pelicans of the National Basketball Association (NBA). He played college basketball for the Oklahoma Sooners. Fears was selected seventh overall by the Pelicans in the 2025 NBA draft.

== High school career ==
Fears played basketball at Joliet West High School in Joliet, Illinois as a sophomore with his older brother, Jeremy, prior to transferring to AZ Compass Prep for his junior year. As a junior, he averaged a team-high 14.2 points along with 3.6 rebounds, 2.3 assists, and 2.5 steals per game.

=== Recruiting ===
Fears became a consensus four-star recruit and was tabbed as a top-25 guard in the 2025 ESPN 100. On January 22, 2024, he committed to Illinois in 2025 over offers from Providence, Kansas, Michigan, and Ole Miss. However on July 1, Fears decommitted from Illinois and then committed to Oklahoma and reclassified into the 2024 class. With his commitment, Fears became the first Oklahoma prospect to be ranked in the top 40 by ESPN since Trae Young.

College recruiting
Name	Hometown	School	Height	Weight	Commit date
Jeremiah Fears; PG / SG	Joliet, IL	Arizona Compass Prep (AZ)	6 ft 4 in (1.93 m)	182 lb (83 kg)	Jul 20, 2024
Jeremiah Fears; PG / SG	Recruit ratings: Rivals: 247Sports: On3: ESPN: (88)				
Overall recruit ranking: Rivals: 44 247Sports: 65 On3: 57 ESPN: 40
Note: In many cases, Scout, Rivals, 247Sports, On3, and ESPN may conflict in their listings of height and weight.; In these cases, the average was taken. ESPN grades are on a 100-point scale.; Sources: "Oklahoma Sooners 2024 Basketball Commitments". Rivals.; "2024 Oklahoma Sooners Recruiting Class". ESPN.; "2024 Team Ranking". Rivals.

== College career ==
Fears joined the 2024–25 Oklahoma Sooners following the transfers of starting guards Javian McCollum, Otega Oweh, and Milos Uzan.

On November 4, 2024, Fears debuted for Oklahoma, recording 16 points, 5 rebounds, 6 assists, and 2 steals off the bench against Lindenwood. He continued to come off the bench until the Sooners' fourth game against East Texas A&M on November 21 where he tallied a game-high 20 points. In the 3-game November 27–29 2024 Battle 4 Atlantis, Fears led Oklahoma to an upset win over No. 24 Arizona in the semifinals, posting a then season-high 26 points, along with 5 rebounds and 5 assists. Fears, alongside teammate Jalon Moore, led Oklahoma to the championship, averaging 18.7 points, 5.3 assists, and 2.7 steals, earning himself all-tournament team honors and being named on December 2 as the SEC Freshman of the Week. On December 14, Fears posted 17 points and 5 assists in an 80–65 victory over rival Oklahoma State. On December 18 against No. 24 Michigan in the 2024 Jumpman Invitational, Fears posted a career-high 30 points, including a game-winning four-point play after being fouled on a made three-pointer with 11.5 seconds remaining. He became the first Oklahoma true freshman since Trae Young in 2018 to score 30-plus points. Fears would later earn his second Freshman of the Week award following his performance against Michigan and Central Arkansas. On January 7, 2025, Fears was named as one of 25 midseason finalists for the Wooden Award. After going scoreless against Texas A&M, Fears scored a team-high 21 points on February 1, notching his sixth game of at least 20 points, in a 97–67 victory over No. 24 Vanderbilt. On February 22 against No. 21 Mississippi State, Oklahoma snapped a five-game losing streak behind Fears' first career double-double, with 27 points and 10 assists.

Following the season, Fears declared for the 2025 NBA draft.

== Professional career ==
On June 25, 2025, Fears was selected with the seventh overall pick by the New Orleans Pelicans in the 2025 NBA draft. He became Oklahoma's fourth top-seven pick in the last 16 years, joining Blake Griffin, Buddy Hield, and Trae Young. He joins Hield as the second Sooner to be drafted by the Pelicans. On July 5, Fears signed his rookie contract. On October 22, Fears made his NBA regular-season debut, putting up 17 points in a 128–122 loss to the Memphis Grizzlies.

Following a January 27, 2026 game against the Oklahoma City Thunder, Fears was shoved by Thunder guard Lu Dort, initiating an altercation; both players were subsequently fined $25,000 as a result. On April 7, Jeremiah had a career-high 40 points on 17-of-29 shooting in a 156–137 win against the Utah Jazz. Fears set the Pelicans franchise record for most points scored in a game by a rookie, as well as the record for the youngest guard to score 40 points in an NBA game. Fears played in all 82 games for New Orleans during his rookie campaign, becoming the first Pelicans rookie to do so, and averaged 14.3 points, 3.7 rebounds, and 3.4 assists.

On November 16, 2026, Fears recorded his first career triple-double with 19 points, 10 rebounds, and 10 assists in a 115–94 win over the Golden State Warriors. He also became the youngest player in Pelicans franchise history to record a triple-double at 20 years and 33 days old, surpassing the previous record set by Chris Paul at 20 years and 331 days old.

== National team career ==
Fears was named to the United States Under-18 basketball team at the 2024 FIBA Under-18 AmeriCup, marking his first national team debut. He averaged 6.5 points, 2.7 rebounds, 2.8 assists and a team-high three steals per game as Team USA won the gold medal.

== Career statistics ==
Legend
GP	Games played	GS	Games started	MPG	Minutes per game
FG%	Field goal percentage	3P%	3-point field goal percentage	FT%	Free throw percentage
RPG	Rebounds per game	APG	Assists per game	SPG	Steals per game
BPG	Blocks per game	PPG	Points per game	**Bold**	Career high
*	Led the league

=== NBA ===
Year	Team	GP	GS	MPG	FG%	3P%	FT%	RPG	APG	SPG	BPG	PPG
2025–26	New Orleans	82*	49	25.8	.434	.330	.789	3.7	3.4	1.2	.4	14.3
Career		82	49	25.8	.434	.330	.789	3.7	3.4	1.2	.4	14.3

=== College ===
Year	Team	GP	GS	MPG	FG%	3P%	FT%	RPG	APG	SPG	BPG	PPG
2024–25	Oklahoma	34	31	30.2	.434	.284	.851	4.1	4.1	1.6	.1	17.1

== Personal life ==
Fears was born in Chicago, Illinois. His father, Jeremy Fears Sr., played college basketball at Ohio and earned Mid-American Conference All-Freshman accolades in 2005 before transferring to Bradley. His older brother, Jeremy Fears Jr., plays college basketball for Michigan State.
