= 2026–27 Orlando Magic season =

- Head coach: Sean Sweeney
- President: Jeff Weltman
- General manager: Anthony Parker
- Owners: RDV Sports, Inc.
- Arena: Kia Center

Results
- Record: 7–8 (.467)
- Place: Division: 3rd (Southeast); Conference: 8th (Eastern)
- Stats at Basketball Reference

Local media
- Television: FanDuel Sports Network Florida; Over-the-air affiliates (Note: Affiliates include: WESH/WKCF (Orlando); WMOR-TV (Tampa); WCJB-TV/WCJB-DT2/WCJB-DT3 (Gainesville)) (10 simulcasts)
- Radio: 96.9 The Game

The 2026–27 Orlando Magic season is the 38th season for the franchise in the National Basketball Association (NBA). On May 4, 2026, the Magic fired head coach Jamahl Mosley after five seasons with the team. On June 1, 2026, the Magic hired Sean Sweeney as their new head coach. Former All-Star Nikola Vučević also signed a one-year contract for his second stint with the Magic, having previously been traded to the Chicago Bulls in 2021.

== Draft picks ==
Round	Pick	Player	Position	Nationality	College
2	46	Felix Okpara	C	Nigeria	Tennessee

The Magic entered the draft holding one second-round selection. They held no first-round selection because theirs was swapped with the Phoenix Suns via a 2023 trade, and the pick was used by the Charlotte Hornets in the draft, while the pick they got in such swap with Phoenix was later traded to the Memphis Grizzlies in 2025 as an exchange for Desmond Bane.

They used their only selection to select Felix Okpara, but soon traded his draft rights to the Washington Wizards in a three-team deal with the Milwaukee Bucks for the draft rights to the 51st pick, Izaiyah Nelson, and cash.

== Roster ==
Orlando Magic roster
Players

Pos.	No.	Player	Height	Weight	DOB	From
F	5	Paolo Banchero (injured)	6 ft 10 in (2.08 m)	250 lb (113 kg)	2002-11-12	Duke
G	3	Desmond Bane	6 ft 6 in (1.98 m)	215 lb (98 kg)	1998-06-25	TCU
F/C	35	Goga Bitadze	6 ft 11 in (2.11 m)	235 lb (107 kg)	1999-07-20	Georgia
G	0	Anthony Black	6 ft 7 in (2.01 m)	212 lb (96 kg)	2004-01-24	Arkansas
F	8	Jamal Cain	6 ft 7 in (2.01 m)	207 lb (94 kg)	1999-03-20	Oakland
G	2	Jevon Carter	6 ft 1 in (1.85 m)	190 lb (86 kg)	1995-09-14	West Virginia
F/C	34	Wendell Carter Jr.	6 ft 10 in (2.08 m)	262 lb (119 kg)	1999-04-16	Duke
C	14	Colin Castleton (TW)	6 ft 11 in (2.11 m)	250 lb (113 kg)	2000-05-25	Florida
F	23	Tristan da Silva	6 ft 8 in (2.03 m)	217 lb (98 kg)	2001-05-15	Colorado
F	1	Jonathan Isaac (injured)	6 ft 10 in (2.08 m)	240 lb (109 kg)	1997-10-03	Florida State
G	30	Alex Morales (TW)	6 ft 6 in (1.98 m)	195 lb (88 kg)	1997-11-21	Wagner
F	25	Izaiyah Nelson (injured) (TW)	6 ft 10 in (2.08 m)	218 lb (99 kg)	2003-10-01	South Florida
G/F	93	Noah Penda (injured)	6 ft 7 in (2.01 m)	242 lb (110 kg)	2005-01-07	France
G	11	Jase Richardson	6 ft 2 in (1.88 m)	185 lb (84 kg)	2005-10-16	Michigan State
G	4	Jalen Suggs (injured)	6 ft 5 in (1.96 m)	207 lb (94 kg)	2001-06-03	Gonzaga
C	9	Nikola Vučević	6 ft 11 in (2.11 m)	265 lb (120 kg)	1990-10-24	USC
F	22	Franz Wagner	6 ft 10 in (2.08 m)	230 lb (104 kg)	2001-08-27	Michigan

Coaches
Head coach
- Sean Sweeney
Assistant(s)
- Joe Prunty
- Greg Buckner
- Popeye Jones
- Tom Bialaszewski
- Riley Crean
- Jon Harris
- Ben Johnson
- Jacqlyn Poss
- Mfon Udofia
- D.J. Bakker
- Shannan Lum

Legend
- (DP) Unsigned draft pick
- (FA) Free agent
- (S) Suspended
- (GL) On assignment to G League affiliate
- (TW) Two-way affiliate player
- Injured

Roster
Updated: October 16, 2026

== Standings ==
=== Division ===
Southeast Division	W	L	PCT	GB	Home	Road	Div	GP
Miami Heat	9	6	.600	–	5‍–‍3	4‍–‍3	1–1	15
Atlanta Hawks	9	6	.600	–	3‍–‍3	6‍–‍3	4–1	15
Orlando Magic	6	8	.429	2.5	1‍–‍5	5‍–‍3	0–2	14
Washington Wizards	5	11	.313	4.5	2‍–‍5	3‍–‍6	2–3	16
Charlotte Hornets	4	10	.286	4.5	3‍–‍4	1‍–‍6	2–2	14

=== Conference ===
Eastern Conference
#	Team	W	L	PCT	GB	GP
1	Philadelphia 76ers *	13	3	.813	–	16
2	Boston Celtics	11	4	.733	1.5	15
3	Detroit Pistons *	10	4	.714	2.0	14
4	Miami Heat *	9	6	.600	3.5	15
5	Atlanta Hawks	9	6	.600	3.5	15
6	New York Knicks	9	6	.600	3.5	15
7	Cleveland Cavaliers	8	8	.500	5.0	16
8	Orlando Magic	6	8	.429	6.0	14
9	Toronto Raptors	5	10	.333	7.5	15
10	Indiana Pacers	5	10	.333	7.5	15
11	Washington Wizards	5	11	.313	8.0	16
12	Charlotte Hornets	4	10	.286	8.0	14
13	Chicago Bulls	4	10	.286	8.0	14
14	Brooklyn Nets	3	11	.214	9.0	14
15	Milwaukee Bucks	1	15	.063	12.0	16

== Game log ==
=== Preseason ===
2026 preseason game log
Total: 3–1 (Home: 2–0; Road: 1–1)
Preseason: 3–1 (home: 2–0; road: 1–1)

Game	Date	Team	Score	High points	High rebounds	High assists	Location Attendance	Record
1	October 7	@ Memphis	W 122–118	Tristan da Silva (19)	Alex Morales (10)	Franz Wagner (7)	FedExForum; 10,007	1–0
2	October 11	@ Cleveland	L 105–119	Tristan da Silva (17)	Paolo Banchero (7)	Noah Penda (5)	Rocket Arena; 14,861	1–1
3	October 13	Cleveland	W 132–116	Paolo Banchero (24)	Paolo Banchero (8)	Franz Wagner (8)	Kia Center; 16,468	2–1
4	October 16	Miami	W 136–115	Paolo Banchero (24)	Banchero, Vučević (7)	Franz Wagner (6)	Kia Center; 18,846	3–1

2026–27 preseason schedule

=== Regular season ===
2026–27 game log
Total: 7–8 (Home: 1–5; Road: 6–3)
October: 2–3 (home: 0–2; road: 2–1)

Game	Date	Team	Score	High points	High rebounds	High assists	Location Attendance	Record
1	October 21	Atlanta	L 125–132	Paolo Banchero (35)	Banchero, Carter Jr. (7)	Paolo Banchero (10)	Kia Center; 18,864	0–1
2	October 23	Minnesota	L 93–115	Wendell Carter Jr. (20)	Wendell Carter Jr. (9)	Jalen Suggs (6)	Kia Center; 19,551	0–2
3	October 25	@ New York	W 111–102	Franz Wagner (23)	Franz Wagner (13)	Franz Wagner (9)	Madison Square Garden; 19,812	1–2
4	October 28	@ Toronto	L 99–129	Tristan da Silva (20)	Wendell Carter Jr. (10)	Franz Wagner (5)	Scotiabank Arena; 19,107	1–3
5	October 30	@ Toronto	W 121–114	Desmond Bane (28)	Wendell Carter Jr. (7)	Franz Wagner (11)	Scotiabank Arena; 19,364	2–3

November: 5–5 (home: 1–3; road: 4–2)

Game	Date	Team	Score	High points	High rebounds	High assists	Location Attendance	Record
6	November 1	Boston	L 97–108	Black, da Silva (23)	Carter Jr., da Silva (10)	Franz Wagner (12)	Kia Center; 18,236	2–4
7	November 2	Washington	L 94–103	Franz Wagner (22)	Wendell Carter Jr. (9)	Richardson, Wagner (5)	Kia Center; 19,240	2–5
8	November 5	@ Phoenix	L 104–117	Wendell Carter Jr. (27)	Wendell Carter Jr. (13)	Franz Wagner (15)	Mortgage Matchup Center; 17,071	2–6
9	November 7	@ Golden State	L 119–126 (OT)	Franz Wagner (30)	Jamal Cain (12)	Franz Wagner (11)	Chase Center; 18,064	2–7
10	November 10	@ Sacramento	W 107–100	Franz Wagner (33)	Wendell Carter Jr. (11)	Franz Wagner (7)	Golden 1 Center; 13,573	3–7
11	November 11	@ Utah	W 123–108	Franz Wagner (38)	Franz Wagner (8)	Anthony Black (8)	Delta Center; 17,867	4–7
12	November 13	Milwaukee	W 107–99	Franz Wagner (35)	Franz Wagner (9)	Franz Wagner (12)	Kia Center; 19,140	5–7
13	November 16	@ Boston	W 115–105	Desmond Bane (24)	Desmond Bane (8)	Franz Wagner (9)	TD Garden	6–7
14	November 18	Philadelphia	L 116–121	Franz Wagner (27)	Tied (8)	Franz Wagner (11)	Kia Center; 19,365	6–8
15	November 20	@ Brooklyn	W 113–111	Franz Wagner (35)	Carter Jr., Vučević (8)	Franz Wagner (7)	Barclays Center; 17,067	7–8
16	November 22	@ Washington					Capital One Arena	–
17	November 24	Detroit					Kia Center	–
18	November 28	@ Washington					Capital One Arena	–
19	November 29	@ Detroit					Little Caesars Arena	–

December: 0–0 (home: 0–0; road: 0–0)

Game	Date	Team	Score	High points	High rebounds	High assists	Location Attendance	Record
20	December 2	@ Dallas					American Airlines Center	–
21	TBD	TBD					TBD	–
22	TBD	TBD					TBD	–
23	December 12	@ Philadelphia					Xfinity Mobile Arena	–
24	December 14	Philadelphia					Kia Center	–
25	December 16	Cleveland					Kia Center	–
26	December 18	@ Brooklyn					Barclays Center	–
27	December 19	@ Atlanta					State Farm Arena	–
28	December 21	Sacramento					Kia Center	–
29	December 23	Charlotte					Kia Center	–
30	December 26	Toronto					Kia Center	–
31	December 27	Milwaukee					Kia Center	–
32	December 29	@ Charlotte					Spectrum Center	–
33	December 31	@ Indiana					Gainbridge Fieldhouse	–

January: 0–0 (home: 0–0; road: 0–0)

Game	Date	Team	Score	High points	High rebounds	High assists	Location Attendance	Record
34	January 1	@ Detroit					Little Caesars Arena	–
35	January 3	Memphis					Kia Center	–
36	January 5	L.A. Clippers					Kia Center	–
37	January 7	Cleveland					Kia Center	–
38	January 8	@ New Orleans					Smoothie King Center	–
39	January 10	Oklahoma City					Kia Center	–
40	January 12	@ Portland					Moda Center	–
41	January 14	@ L.A. Lakers					Crypto.com Arena	–
42	January 15	@ L.A. Clippers					Intuit Dome	–
43	January 17	@ Denver					Ball Arena	–
44	January 19	Golden State					Kia Center	–
45	January 22	Portland					Kia Center	–
46	January 24	Houston					Kia Center	–
47	January 25	@ Charlotte					Spectrum Center	–
48	January 28	Chicago					Kia Center	–
49	January 29	@ Houston					Toyota Center	–
50	January 31	Brooklyn					Kia Center	–

February: 0–0 (home: 0–0; road: 0–0)

Game	Date	Team	Score	High points	High rebounds	High assists	Location Attendance	Record
51	February 2	New Orleans					Kia Center	–
52	February 4	@ San Antonio					Frost Bank Center	–
53	February 6	@ Cleveland					Rocket Arena	–
54	February 8	@ Milwaukee					Fiserv Forum	–
55	February 10	@ Memphis					FedExForum	–
56	February 12	Miami					Kia Center	–
57	February 13	San Antonio					Kia Center	–
58	February 15	@ Oklahoma City					Paycom Center	–
59	February 17	Dallas					Kia Center	–
All-Star Game
60	February 25	Charlotte					Kia Center	–
61	February 28	Atlanta					Kia Center	–

March: 0–0 (home: 0–0; road: 0–0)

Game	Date	Team	Score	High points	High rebounds	High assists	Location Attendance	Record
62	March 2	L.A. Lakers					Kia Center	–
63	March 4	Indiana					Kia Center	–
64	March 5	Utah					Kia Center	–
65	March 9	Phoenix					Kia Center	–
66	March 10	@ Miami					Kaseya Center	–
67	March 13	@ Atlanta					State Farm Arena	–
68	March 15	@ Chicago					United Center	–
69	March 16	@ Milwaukee					Fiserv Forum	–
70	March 18	@ Boston					TD Garden	–
71	March 20	Denver					Kia Center	–
72	March 22	Indiana					Kia Center	–
73	March 24	@ Chicago					United Center	–
74	March 26	@ Minnesota					Target Center	–
75	March 28	New York					Kia Center	–
76	March 30	New York					Kia Center	–

April: 0–0 (home: 0–0; road: 0–0)

Game	Date	Team	Score	High points	High rebounds	High assists	Location Attendance	Record
77	April 1	@ Indiana					Gainbridge Fieldhouse	–
78	April 3	Washington					Kia Center	–
79	April 5	Miami					Kia Center	–
80	April 7	Boston					Kia Center	–
81	April 9	Toronto					Kia Center	–
82	April 11	@ Miami					Kaseya Center	–

2026–27 season schedule

== NBA Cup ==
=== East Group A ===
Pos	Team	Pld	W	L	PF	PA	PD	Qualification
1	Orlando Magic	3	3	0	341	324	+17	Advance to knockout stage
2	Toronto Raptors	3	2	1	340	330	+10	Possible knockout stage based on ranking
3	Detroit Pistons	2	1	1	212	199	+13	
4	Brooklyn Nets	2	0	2	205	223	−18	
5	Milwaukee Bucks	2	0	2	206	228	−22	

Updated to game(s) played on November 20, 2026. Source:

== Transactions ==
=== Trades ===
Date	Trade		Ref.
June 24, 2026	Three-team trade		
June 24, 2026	To Orlando Magic: Draft rights to Izaiyah Nelson (No. 51) (from Washington); Cash considerations (from Milwaukee)	To Milwaukee Bucks: Draft rights to Malique Lewis (No. 60) (from Washington)	
June 24, 2026	To Washington Wizards: Draft rights to Felix Okpara (No. 46) (from Orlando)		

=== Free agency ===
==== Re-signed ====
Date	Player	Ref.
July 1, 2026	Jonathan Isaac	
July 1, 2026	Jevon Carter	

==== Additions ====
Date	Player	Former Team	Ref.
July 1, 2026	Nikola Vučević	Boston Celtics	
September 3, 2026	Malaki Branham	Houston Rockets	
September 3, 2026	JD Davison	Cleveland Charge (NBA G League)	

=== Subtractions ===
Player	Reason	New Team	Ref.
Moritz Wagner	Free agency	Brooklyn Nets	
