= 2026–27 Indiana Pacers season =

2026–27 NBA season by team

- Head coach: Rick Carlisle
- President: Kevin Pritchard
- General manager: Chad Buchanan
- Owner: Herbert Simon
- Arena: Gainbridge Fieldhouse

Results
- Record: 5–11 (.313)
- Place: Division: 3rd (Central); Conference: 11th (Eastern)
- Stats at Basketball Reference

Local media
- Television: DAZN
- Radio: 1070 The Fan

The 2026–27 Indiana Pacers season is the 60th season of the franchise and the 51st season in the National Basketball Association (NBA). This season marks the return of star point guard Tyrese Haliburton after a season-ending injury in Game 7 of the 2025 NBA Finals. However, Haliburton was sidelined once again following a left hamstring strain sustained during their game against the Milwaukee Bucks on October 26.

== Draft ==
The Pacers entered the draft without any draft picks. Although they finished the previous season with the league's second-worst record, their first-round pick was conveyed to the Los Angeles Clippers due to the Ivica Zubac trade in February 2026, as it dropped into its unprotected 5th to 9th pick range in the subsequent draft lottery. With the Pacers finishing with a worse record than the Miami Heat, their more favorable second-round pick was conveyed to the Memphis Grizzlies via the Milwaukee Bucks following two separate trades in 2021.

During the draft, the Pacers acquired the draft rights to Braden Smith, who was selected 38th overall, from the Chicago Bulls in exchange for Kam Jones and future second-round picks.

== Roster ==
Indiana Pacers roster
Players

Pos.	No.	Player	Height	Weight	DOB	From
F	24	Kobe Brown (TW)	6 ft 7 in (2.01 m)	250 lb (113 kg)	2000-01-01	Missouri
G	12	Johnny Furphy (injured)	6 ft 8 in (2.03 m)	200 lb (91 kg)	2004-12-08	Kansas
G	0	Tyrese Haliburton (injured)	6 ft 5 in (1.96 m)	185 lb (84 kg)	2000-02-29	Iowa State
C	32	Jay Huff	7 ft 1 in (2.16 m)	240 lb (109 kg)	1997-08-25	Virginia
G	29	Quenton Jackson	6 ft 4 in (1.93 m)	173 lb (78 kg)	1998-09-15	Texas A&M
G	9	T. J. McConnell	6 ft 1 in (1.85 m)	190 lb (86 kg)	1992-03-25	Arizona
F/C	22	Larry Nance Jr.	6 ft 8 in (2.03 m)	245 lb (111 kg)	1993-01-01	Wyoming
G/F	2	Andrew Nembhard	6 ft 4 in (1.93 m)	191 lb (87 kg)	2000-01-16	Gonzaga
G/F	23	Aaron Nesmith	6 ft 5 in (1.96 m)	215 lb (98 kg)	1999-10-16	Vanderbilt
G/F	10	Kelly Oubre Jr.	6 ft 7 in (2.01 m)	210 lb (95 kg)	1995-09-12	Kansas
G	26	Ben Sheppard (injured)	6 ft 6 in (1.98 m)	190 lb (86 kg)	2001-07-16	Belmont
F	43	Pascal Siakam	6 ft 9 in (2.06 m)	245 lb (111 kg)	1994-04-02	New Mexico State
F	18	Jalen Slawson (TW)	6 ft 7 in (2.01 m)	215 lb (98 kg)	1999-10-22	Furman
G	3	Braden Smith (TW)	5 ft 11 in (1.80 m)	170 lb (77 kg)	2003-07-25	Purdue
F	1	Obi Toppin	6 ft 9 in (2.06 m)	220 lb (100 kg)	1998-03-04	Dayton
F	5	Jarace Walker	6 ft 7 in (2.01 m)	235 lb (107 kg)	2003-09-04	Houston
C	40	Ivica Zubac	7 ft 0 in (2.13 m)	240 lb (109 kg)	1997-03-18	Croatia

Coaches
Head coach
- Rick Carlisle
Assistant(s)
- Maurice Baker
- Jenny Boucek
- Jim Boylen
- Jannero Pargo
- Lloyd Pierce
- Isaac Yacob

Legend
- (DP) Unsigned draft pick
- (FA) Free agent
- (S) Suspended
- (GL) On assignment to G League affiliate
- (TW) Two-way affiliate player
- Injured

Roster
Updated: October 17, 2026

== Standings ==
=== Division ===
Central Division	W	L	PCT	GB	Home	Road	Div	GP
Detroit Pistons	10	4	.714	–	3‍–‍2	7‍–‍2	0–0	14
Cleveland Cavaliers	8	8	.500	3.0	6‍–‍3	2‍–‍5	2–0	16
Indiana Pacers	5	10	.333	5.5	2‍–‍6	3‍–‍4	0–1	15
Chicago Bulls	4	10	.286	6.0	1‍–‍4	3‍–‍6	1–1	14
Milwaukee Bucks	1	15	.063	10.0	1‍–‍8	0‍–‍7	1–2	16

=== Conference ===
Eastern Conference
#	Team	W	L	PCT	GB	GP
1	Philadelphia 76ers *	13	3	.813	–	16
2	Boston Celtics	11	4	.733	1.5	15
3	Detroit Pistons *	10	4	.714	2.0	14
4	Miami Heat *	9	6	.600	3.5	15
5	Atlanta Hawks	9	6	.600	3.5	15
6	New York Knicks	9	6	.600	3.5	15
7	Cleveland Cavaliers	8	8	.500	5.0	16
8	Orlando Magic	6	8	.429	6.0	14
9	Toronto Raptors	5	10	.333	7.5	15
10	Indiana Pacers	5	10	.333	7.5	15
11	Washington Wizards	5	11	.313	8.0	16
12	Charlotte Hornets	4	10	.286	8.0	14
13	Chicago Bulls	4	10	.286	8.0	14
14	Brooklyn Nets	3	11	.214	9.0	14
15	Milwaukee Bucks	1	15	.063	12.0	16

== Game log ==
=== Preseason ===
2026 preseason game log
Total: 1–3 (Home: 1–2; Road: 0–1)
Preseason: 1–3 (home: 1–2; road: 0–1)

Game	Date	Team	Score	High points	High rebounds	High assists	Location Attendance	Record
1	October 7	Minnesota	W 123–112	Aaron Nesmith (19)	Tied (5)	Jarace Walker (10)	Hilton Coliseum; 13,952	1–0
2	October 10	Atlanta	L 117–119	Oubre Jr., Siakam (13)	Jarace Walker (7)	Nesmith, Smith (5)	Gainbridge Fieldhouse; 11,002	1–1
3	October 13	@ Oklahoma City	L 112–114 (OT)	Tyrese Haliburton (24)	Ivica Zubac (13)	Tied (5)	Paycom Center	1–2
4	October 16	Milwaukee	L 127–128 (OT)	Pascal Siakam (24)	Ivica Zubac (11)	Nembhard, Smith (7)	Gainbridge Fieldhouse; 10,283	1–3

2026–27 preseason schedule

=== Regular season ===
2026–27 game log
Total: 5–11 (Home: 2–6; Road: 3–5)
October: 2–4 (home: 0–2; road: 2–2)

Game	Date	Team	Score	High points	High rebounds	High assists	Location Attendance	Record
1	October 21	@ New Orleans	W 123–120	Pascal Siakam (30)	Ivica Zubac (14)	Tyrese Haliburton (12)	Smoothie King Center; 17,232	1–0
2	October 23	Dallas	L 105–121	Pascal Siakam (23)	Ivica Zubac (11)	Tyrese Haliburton (7)	Gainbridge Fieldhouse; 17,274	1–1
3	October 25	@ Brooklyn	W 136–109	Tyrese Haliburton (24)	Siakam, Walker (7)	Tyrese Haliburton (10)	Barclays Center; 17,548	2–1
4	October 26	@ Milwaukee	L 102–110	Tyrese Haliburton (22)	Pascal Siakam (13)	Tyrese Haliburton (9)	Fiserv Forum; 10,674	2–2
5	October 28	Philadelphia	L 109–114	Pascal Siakam (26)	Pascal Siakam (11)	Andrew Nembhard (14)	Gainbridge Fieldhouse; 17,274	2–3
6	October 30	@ Miami	L 125–145	Quenton Jackson (24)	Brown, Walker (6)	Andrew Nembhard (9)	Kaseya Center; 19,653	2–4

November: 3–7 (home: 2–4; road: 1–3)

Game	Date	Team	Score	High points	High rebounds	High assists	Location Attendance	Record
7	November 1	Brooklyn	L 90–98	Andrew Nembhard (23)	Nance Jr., Walker (6)	Pascal Siakam (5)	Gainbridge Fieldhouse; 17,274	2–5
8	November 2	Atlanta	L 104–108	Jay Huff (22)	Jay Huff (8)	Braden Smith (10)	Gainbridge Fieldhouse; 16,058	2–6
9	November 4	@ Memphis	W 107–103	Andrew Nembhard (22)	Jarace Walker (8)	Braden Smith (5)	FedEx Forum; 13,464	3–6
10	November 7	Denver	L 102–114	Pascal Siakam (23)	Ivica Zubac (12)	Andrew Nembhard (8)	Mexico City Arena; 20,191	3–7
11	November 9	@ Dallas	L 122–125	Pascal Siakam (29)	Pascal Siakam (9)	Andrew Nembhard (12)	American Airlines Center; 19,065	3–8
12	November 11	Washington	W 114–101	Pascal Siakam (28)	Ivica Zubac (12)	Andrew Nembhard (10)	Gainbridge Fieldhouse; 16,679	4–8
13	November 13	New York	W 106–104	Pascal Siakam (19)	Ivica Zubac (13)	T. J. McConnell (7)	Gainbridge Fieldhouse; 17,274	5–8
14	November 15	@ Philadelphia	L 124–131	Pascal Siakam (31)	Quenton Jackson (6)	Quenton Jackson (8)	Xfinity Mobile Arena; 21,024	5–9
15	November 18	Houston	L 104–119	Pascal Siakam (24)	Braden Smith (5)	T. J. McConnell (5)	Gainbridge Fieldhouse; 17,274	5–10
16	November 20	@ Cleveland	L 119–128	Siakam, Zubac (21)	Ivica Zubac (10)	Andrew Nembhard (8)	Rocket Arena; 19,432	5–11
17	November 22	@ New York					Madison Square Garden	–
18	November 23	Oklahoma City					Gainbridge Fieldhouse	–
19	November 27	Philadelphia					Gainbridge Fieldhouse	–
20	November 28	@ Chicago					United Center	–

December: 0–0 (home: 0–0; road: 0–0)

Game	Date	Team	Score	High points	High rebounds	High assists	Location Attendance	Record
21	December 1	@ Cleveland					Rocket Arena	–
22	December 3	@ Atlanta					State Farm Arena	–
23	December	TBD					TBD	–
24	December	TBD					TBD	–
25	December 13	Detroit					Gainbridge Fieldhouse	–
26	December 16	Golden State					Gainbridge Fieldhouse	–
27	December 17	Portland					Gainbridge Fieldhouse	–
28	December 20	@ L.A. Clippers					Intuit Dome	–
29	December 21	@ L.A. Lakers					Crypto.com Arena	–
30	December 23	@ Phoenix					Mortgage Matchup Center	–
31	December 26	@ Utah					Delta Center	–
32	December 27	@ Denver					Ball Arena	–
33	December 29	L.A. Clippers					Gainbridge Fieldhouse	–
34	December 31	Orlando					Gainbridge Fieldhouse	–

January: 0–0 (home: 0–0; road: 0–0)

Game	Date	Team	Score	High points	High rebounds	High assists	Location Attendance	Record
35	January 2	Minnesota					Gainbridge Fieldhouse	–
36	January 4	Chicago					Gainbridge Fieldhouse	–
37	January 6	@ San Antonio					Frost Bank Center	–
38	January 7	@ Atlanta					State Farm Arena	–
39	January 9	Milwaukee					Gainbridge Fieldhouse	–
40	January 11	Brooklyn					Gainbridge Fieldhouse	–
41	January 13	Milwaukee					Gainbridge Fieldhouse	–
42	January 15	Phoenix					Gainbridge Fieldhouse	–
43	January 17	@ Washington					Capital One Arena	–
44	January 19	@ Philadelphia					Xfinity Mobile Arena	–
45	January 20	@ Boston					TD Garden	–
46	January 22	@ Detroit					Little Caesars Arena	–
47	January 26	Chicago					Gainbridge Fieldhouse	–
48	January 28	L.A. Lakers					Gainbridge Fieldhouse	–
49	January 30	Washington					Gainbridge Fieldhouse	–

February: 0–0 (home: 0–0; road: 0–0)

Game	Date	Team	Score	High points	High rebounds	High assists	Location Attendance	Record
50	February 1	Miami					Gainbridge Fieldhouse	–
51	February 3	Atlanta					Gainbridge Fieldhouse	–
52	February 5	@ Oklahoma City					Paycom Center	–
53	February 8	New Orleans					Gainbridge Fieldhouse	–
54	February 10	Cleveland					Gainbridge Fieldhouse	–
55	February 11	Utah					Gainbridge Fieldhouse	–
56	February 13	Sacramento					Gainbridge Fieldhouse	–
57	February 15	@ Golden State					Chase Center	–
58	February 17	@ Sacramento					Golden 1 Center	–
59	February 18	@ Portland					Moda Center	–
All-Star Game
60	February 26	@ Minnesota					Target Center	–
61	February 28	Toronto					Gainbridge Fieldhouse	–

March: 0–0 (home: 0–0; road: 0–0)

Game	Date	Team	Score	High points	High rebounds	High assists	Location Attendance	Record
62	March 2	Boston					Gainbridge Fieldhouse	–
63	March 4	@ Orlando					Kia Center	–
64	March 6	@ Miami					Kaseya Center	–
65	March 8	Charlotte					Gainbridge Fieldhouse	–
66	March 11	@ Charlotte					Spectrum Center	–
67	March 13	@ Houston					Toyota Center	–
68	March 15	@ Brooklyn					Barclays Center	–
69	March 16	Detroit					Gainbridge Fieldhouse	–
70	March 18	Toronto					Gainbridge Fieldhouse	–
71	March 20	@ Milwaukee					Fiserv Forum	–
72	March 22	@ Orlando					Kia Center	–
73	March 24	Memphis					Gainbridge Fieldhouse	–
74	March 25	San Antonio					Gainbridge Fieldhouse	–
75	March 29	@ Chicago					United Center	–
76	March 30	Boston					Gainbridge Fieldhouse	–

April: 0–0 (home: 0–0; road: 0–0)

Game	Date	Team	Score	High points	High rebounds	High assists	Location Attendance	Record
77	April 1	Orlando					Gainbridge Fieldhouse	–
78	April 4	@ Toronto					Scotiabank Arena	–
79	April 6	@ Charlotte					Spectrum Center	–
80	April 7	@ Detroit					Little Caesars Arena	–
81	April 9	Cleveland					Gainbridge Fieldhouse	–
82	April 11	@ New York					Madison Square Garden	–

2026–27 season schedule

== NBA Cup ==
=== East Group B ===
Pos	Team	Pld	W	L	PF	PA	PD	Qualification
1	Miami Heat	2	2	0	278	246	+32	Advance to knockout stage
2	Cleveland Cavaliers	3	2	1	368	347	+21	Possible knockout stage based on ranking
3	Philadelphia 76ers	2	1	1	193	212	−19	
4	Indiana Pacers	3	1	2	350	377	−27	
5	New York Knicks	2	0	2	197	204	−7	

Updated to game(s) played on November 20, 2026. Source:

2026–27 game log
Total: 0–0 (Home: 0–0; Road: 0–0)
NBA Cup: 0–0 (home: 0–0; road: 0–0)

Game	Date	Team	Score	High points	High rebounds	High assists	Location Attendance	Record
1	October 30	@ Miami					Kaseya Center	–
2	November 13	New York					Gainbridge Fieldhouse	–
3	November 20	@ Cleveland					Rocket Arena	–
4	November 27	Philadelphia					Gainbridge Fieldhouse	–

2026–27 season schedule

== Transactions ==
=== Trades ===
Date	Trade		Ref.
June 24, 2026	To Chicago Bulls: Kam Jones; 2028 second-round pick swap right (Note: Chicago may trade its own pick for either one of the picks originally belonging to Indiana and Phoenix.); 2030 second-round pick swap right (Note: Chicago may trade its own pick for Indiana's own pick.); Cash considerations	To Indiana Pacers: Draft rights to Braden Smith (No. 38)	

=== Free agency ===
==== Re-signed ====
Date	Player	Ref.
July 9, 2026	Kobe Brown (TW)	
July 22, 2026	Jalen Slawson (TW)	

==== Additions ====
Date	Player	Former Team	Ref.
July 8, 2026	Kelly Oubre Jr.	Philadelphia 76ers	
July 9, 2026	Larry Nance Jr.	Cleveland Cavaliers	
September 22, 2026	James Johnson	—N/a	

==== Subtractions ====
Date	Player	New Team	Ref.
July 9, 2026	Micah Potter	Portland Trail Blazers	
July 22, 2026	Taelon Peter	San Antonio Spurs	
August 14, 2026	Ethan Thompson	Partizan Belgrade	
September 22, 2026	Kowacie Reeves Jr.	—N/a	
September 22, 2026	Jalen Warley	—N/a	
