= 2026–27 Sacramento Kings season =

- Head coach: Doug Christie
- President: John Rinehart
- General manager: Scott Perry
- Owner: Vivek Ranadivé
- Arena: Golden 1 Center

Results
- Record: 2–14 (.125)
- Place: Division: 5th (Pacific); Conference: 15th (Western)
- Stats at Basketball Reference

Local media
- Television: NBC Sports California; CBS 13
- Radio: KHTK Sports 1140

The 2026–27 Sacramento Kings season is the 82nd season for the franchise in the National Basketball Association (NBA), and 42nd season in the city of Sacramento. During the free agency period, the Kings picked up former All-Star Ben Simmons on a one-year deal to revive his career after an injury-plagued absence from the NBA, but an Achilles tear sustained during the preseason is now expected to sideline him for the entire season.

The Kings opened the season with a 1–14 record, marking their worst start to a season since 1990–91.

== Draft picks ==
Round	Pick	Player	Position	Nationality	College
1	7	Darius Acuff Jr.	PG	United States	Arkansas
2	34	Meleek Thomas	SG/PG	United States	Arkansas
2	45	Emanuel Sharp	SG	Israel; United States	Houston

The Kings entered the draft holding one first-round selection and two second-round selections. They retained their two original selections. The 45th pick, originally owned by the Charlotte Hornets, was acquired from the San Antonio Spurs via a 2025 three-team trade involving Zach LaVine and De'Aaron Fox. It served as a replacement to Charlotte's protected first-round pick from 2022 to 2025 that did not convey due to consecutive playoff misses during those years.

The Kings acquired the draft rights to 29th pick Alex Karaban in a draft-day trade with the Cleveland Cavaliers, in exchange for the 34th pick, which turned out to be Meleek Thomas, and their own 2032 second-round pick.

== Roster ==
Sacramento Kings roster
Players

Pos.	No.	Player	Height	Weight	DOB	From
G	5	Darius Acuff Jr.	6 ft 2 in (1.88 m)	190 lb (86 kg)	2006-11-16	Arkansas
F	9	Precious Achiuwa	6 ft 8 in (2.03 m)	243 lb (110 kg)	1999-09-19	Nigeria
F	19	Leaky Black (TW)	6 ft 7 in (2.01 m)	209 lb (95 kg)	1999-06-14	North Carolina
C	32	Dylan Cardwell	6 ft 10 in (2.08 m)	255 lb (116 kg)	2001-12-16	Auburn
G/F	15	De'Andre Hunter	6 ft 7 in (2.01 m)	221 lb (100 kg)	1997-12-02	Virginia
F	33	Alex Karaban	6 ft 7 in (2.01 m)	220 lb (100 kg)	2002-11-11	Connecticut
G	8	Zach LaVine	6 ft 5 in (1.96 m)	200 lb (91 kg)	1995-03-10	UCLA
F	22	Jonathan Mogbo (TW)	6 ft 7 in (2.01 m)	225 lb (102 kg)	2001-10-29	San Francisco
G	0	Malik Monk	6 ft 3 in (1.91 m)	200 lb (91 kg)	1998-02-04	Kentucky
F	13	Keegan Murray	6 ft 8 in (2.03 m)	225 lb (102 kg)	2000-08-19	Iowa
G	3	Sean Pedulla (TW)	6 ft 1 in (1.85 m)	197 lb (89 kg)	2002-10-10	Mississippi
G/F	29	Daeqwon Plowden	6 ft 4 in (1.93 m)	216 lb (98 kg)	1998-08-29	Bowling Green
C	24	Mason Plumlee	7 ft 0 in (2.13 m)	254 lb (115 kg)	1990-03-05	Duke
C	42	Maxime Raynaud (injured)	7 ft 1 in (2.16 m)	268 lb (122 kg)	2003-04-07	Stanford
F/C	11	Domantas Sabonis	6 ft 10 in (2.08 m)	240 lb (109 kg)	1996-05-03	Gonzaga
G	34	Emanuel Sharp	6 ft 3 in (1.91 m)	212 lb (96 kg)	2004-03-07	Houston
G/F	25	Ben Simmons (injured)	6 ft 9 in (2.06 m)	245 lb (111 kg)	1996-07-20	LSU

Coaches
Head coach
- Doug Christie
Assistant(s)
- Mike Woodson (Associate HC)
- Leandro Barbosa
- Bobby Jackson
- Mike Miller
- Chris Darnell

Legend
- (DP) Unsigned draft pick
- (FA) Free agent
- (S) Suspended
- (GL) On assignment to G League affiliate
- (TW) Two-way affiliate player
- Injured

Roster
Updated: July 27, 2026

== Standings ==
=== Division ===
Pacific Division	W	L	PCT	GB	Home	Road	Div	GP
Los Angeles Lakers	14	3	.824	–	7‍–‍2	7‍–‍1	6–1	17
Phoenix Suns	8	7	.533	5.0	5‍–‍4	3‍–‍3	3–2	15
Golden State Warriors	8	8	.500	5.5	6‍–‍1	2‍–‍7	3–2	16
Los Angeles Clippers	4	10	.286	8.5	4‍–‍4	0‍–‍6	1–4	14
Sacramento Kings	1	14	.067	12.0	0‍–‍9	1‍–‍5	0–4	15

=== Conference ===
Western Conference
#	Team	W	L	PCT	GB	GP
1	Los Angeles Lakers *	14	3	.824	–	17
2	San Antonio Spurs *	13	3	.813	0.5	16
3	Memphis Grizzlies	12	4	.750	1.5	16
4	Houston Rockets	12	5	.706	2.0	17
5	Minnesota Timberwolves *	11	5	.688	2.5	16
6	Portland Trail Blazers	10	5	.667	3.0	15
7	Denver Nuggets	9	5	.643	3.5	14
8	Oklahoma City Thunder	10	6	.625	3.5	16
9	Phoenix Suns	8	7	.533	5.0	15
10	Dallas Mavericks	8	7	.533	5.0	15
11	Golden State Warriors	8	8	.500	5.5	16
12	New Orleans Pelicans	5	12	.294	9.0	17
13	Los Angeles Clippers	4	10	.286	8.5	14
14	Utah Jazz	3	14	.176	11.0	17
15	Sacramento Kings	1	14	.067	12.0	15

== Game log ==
=== Preseason ===
2026 preseason game log
Total: 0–5 (Home: 0–2; Road: 0–3)
Preseason: 0–5 (home: 0–2; road: 0–3)

Game	Date	Team	Score	High points	High rebounds	High assists	Location Attendance	Record
1	October 5	L.A. Lakers	L 103–127	Nique Clifford (23)	Dylan Cardwell (10)	Darius Acuff Jr. (4)	Golden 1 Center; 15,130	0–1
2	October 8	@ L.A. Lakers	L 110–114	Precious Achiuwa (18)	Maxime Raynaud (10)	Nique Clifford (6)	Crypto.com Arena; 18,350	0–2
3	October 10	@ Golden State	L 106–111	Darius Acuff Jr. (25)	Achiuwa, Mogbo (8)	Darius Acuff Jr. (8)	Chase Center; 18,064	0–3
4	October 13	Portland	L 98–110	Mogbo, Newton (15)	Precious Achiuwa (11)	Nique Clifford (5)	Golden 1 Center; 12,108	0–4
5	October 16	@ San Antonio	L 97–126	Zach LaVine (20)	Domantas Sabonis (10)	Ben Simmons (7)	Frost Bank Center; 18,354	0–5

2026–27 preseason schedule

=== Regular season ===
2026–27 game log
Total: 2–14 (Home: 1–9; Road: 1–5)
October: 0–6 (home: 0–2; road: 0–4)

Game	Date	Team	Score	High points	High rebounds	High assists	Location Attendance	Record
1	October 21	@ L.A. Clippers	L 96–121	Zach LaVine (28)	Domantas Sabonis (15)	Domantas Sabonis (8)	Intuit Dome; 17,927	0–1
2	October 23	Portland	L 120–128	Darius Acuff Jr. (33)	Domantas Sabonis (19)	Domantas Sabonis (10)	Golden 1 Center; 17,832	0–2
3	October 25	Memphis	L 112–123	Zach LaVine (37)	Domantas Sabonis (15)	Darius Acuff Jr. (7)	Golden 1 Center; 13,076	0–3
4	October 27	@ San Antonio	L 103–130	De'Andre Hunter (24)	Domantas Sabonis (14)	Domantas Sabonis (8)	Frost Bank Center; 18,354	0–4
5	October 29	@ New Orleans	L 120–132	Darius Acuff Jr. (34)	Domantas Sabonis (15)	Darius Acuff Jr. (14)	Smoothie King Center; 15,442	0–5
6	October 31	@ Memphis	L 105–136	Darius Acuff Jr. (38)	Domantas Sabonis (14)	Domantas Sabonis (8)	FedExForum; 15,060	0–6

November: 2–8 (home: 1–7; road: 1–1)

Game	Date	Team	Score	High points	High rebounds	High assists	Location Attendance	Record
7	November 2	@ Dallas	W 115–100	Darius Acuff Jr. (25)	Precious Achiuwa (10)	Malik Monk (7)	American Airlines Center; 18,967	1–6
8	November 4	L.A. Lakers	L 98–112	Darius Acuff Jr. (22)	Domantas Sabonis (17)	Darius Acuff Jr. (12)	Golden 1 Center; 14,484	1–7
9	November 6	San Antonio	L 109–124	Darius Acuff Jr. (22)	Domantas Sabonis (12)	Darius Acuff Jr. (8)	Golden 1 Center; 14,238	1–8
10	November 8	Miami	L 108–114	Darius Acuff Jr. (32)	Precious Achiuwa (14)	Darius Acuff Jr. (10)	Golden 1 Center; 13,016	1–9
11	November 10	Orlando	L 100–107	Zach LaVine (31)	Dylan Cardwell (11)	Darius Acuff Jr. (6)	Golden 1 Center; 13,573	1–10
12	November 13	Portland	L 107–120	De'Andre Hunter (24)	Domantas Sabonis (12)	Acuff Jr., LaVine (6)	Golden 1 Center; 14,831	1–11
13	November 15	Oklahoma City	L 103–125	Darius Acuff Jr. (26)	Domantas Sabonis (13)	Malik Monk (10)	Golden 1 Center; 13,021	1–12
14	November 18	Phoenix	L 107–128	Darius Acuff Jr. (36)	Domantas Sabonis (13)	Domantas Sabonis (8)	Golden 1 Center; 13,016	1–13
15	November 20	@ L.A. Lakers	L 104–106	De'Andre Hunter (30)	Domantas Sabonis (16)	Darius Acuff Jr. (12)	Crypto.com Arena; 19,057	1–14
16	November 21	Boston	W 97–96	Darius Acuff Jr. (21)	Domantas Sabonis (17)	Darius Acuff Jr. (8)	Golden 1 Center; 15,416	2–14
17	November 23	San Antonio					Golden 1 Center	–
18	November 25	@ Golden State					Chase Center	–
19	November 29	Minnesota					Golden 1 Center	–
20	November 30	New Orleans					Golden 1 Center	–

December: 0–0 (home: 0–0; road: 0–0)

Game	Date	Team	Score	High points	High rebounds	High assists	Location Attendance	Record
21	December 2	@ Phoenix					Mortgage Matchup Center	–
22	TBD	TBD					TBD	–
23	TBD	TBD					TBD	–
24	December 13	New Orleans					Golden 1 Center	–
25	December 16	@ Oklahoma City					Paycom Center	–
26	December 18	@ New Orleans					Smoothie King Center	–
27	December 20	@ Miami					Kaseya Center	–
28	December 21	@ Orlando					Kia Center	–
29	December 23	Dallas					Golden 1 Center	–
30	December 27	Utah					Golden 1 Center	–
31	December 29	Philadelphia					Golden 1 Center	–
32	December 31	Brooklyn					Golden 1 Center	–

January: 0–0 (home: 0–0; road: 0–0)

Game	Date	Team	Score	High points	High rebounds	High assists	Location Attendance	Record
33	January 2	@ Phoenix					Mortgage Matchup Center	–
34	January 3	@ Oklahoma City					Paycom Center	–
35	January 5	Detroit					Golden 1 Center	–
36	January 7	Chicago					Golden 1 Center	–
37	January 8	New York					Golden 1 Center	–
38	January 10	Charlotte					Golden 1 Center	–
39	January 12	@ Golden State					Chase Center	–
40	January 14	L.A. Clippers					Golden 1 Center	–
41	January 15	@ Portland					Moda Center	–
42	January 17	@ Utah					Delta Center	–
43	January 19	L.A. Lakers					Golden 1 Center	–
44	January 20	Milwaukee					Golden 1 Center	–
45	January 22	@ L.A. Lakers					Crypto.com Arena	–
46	January 25	@ Denver					Ball Arena	–
47	January 27	@ Philadelphia					Xfinity Mobile Arena	–
48	January 28	@ Washington					Capital One Arena	–
49	January 31	@ Detroit					Little Caesars Arena	–

February: 0–0 (home: 0–0; road: 0–0)

Game	Date	Team	Score	High points	High rebounds	High assists	Location Attendance	Record
50	February 4	Minnesota					Golden 1 Center	–
51	February 6	Phoenix					Golden 1 Center	–
52	February 7	Houston					Golden 1 Center	–
53	February 9	@ Milwaukee					Fiserv Forum	–
54	February 11	@ Houston					Toyota Center	–
55	February 13	@ Indiana					Gainbridge Fieldhouse	–
56	February 14	@ Atlanta					State Farm Arena	–
57	February 17	Indiana					Golden 1 Center	–
All-Star Game
58	February 25	@ Cleveland					Rocket Arena	–
59	February 27	@ Memphis					FedExForum	–
60	February 28	@ Charlotte					Spectrum Center	–

March: 0–0 (home: 0–0; road: 0–0)

Game	Date	Team	Score	High points	High rebounds	High assists	Location Attendance	Record
61	March 2	Washington					Golden 1 Center	–
62	March 4	Oklahoma City					Golden 1 Center	–
63	March 6	L.A. Clippers					Golden 1 Center	–
64	March 8	Denver					Golden 1 Center	–
65	March 10	Golden State					Golden 1 Center	–
66	March 12	@ Utah					Delta Center	–
67	March 14	Cleveland					Golden 1 Center	–
68	March 16	@ Boston					TD Garden	–
69	March 17	@ New York					Madison Square Garden	–
70	March 19	@ Toronto					Scotiabank Arena	–
71	March 21	@ Brooklyn					Barclays Center	–
72	March 22	@ Chicago					United Center	–
73	March 24	Atlanta					Golden 1 Center	–
74	March 27	Toronto					Golden 1 Center	–
75	March 29	Denver					Golden 1 Center	–
76	March 31	@ Minnesota					Target Center	–

April: 0–0 (home: 0–0; road: 0–0)

Game	Date	Team	Score	High points	High rebounds	High assists	Location Attendance	Record
77	April 2	@ Dallas					American Airlines Center	–
78	April 4	Golden State					Golden 1 Center	–
79	April 6	@ San Antonio					Frost Bank Center	–
80	April 7	@ Houston					Toyota Center	–
81	April 9	Dallas					Golden 1 Center	–
82	April 11	@ L.A. Clippers					Intuit Dome	–

2026–27 season schedule

== NBA Cup ==
=== West Group C ===
Pos	Team	Pld	W	L	PF	PA	PD	Qualification
1	San Antonio Spurs	2	2	0	247	194	+53	Advance to knockout stage
2	Los Angeles Lakers	3	2	1	325	334	−9	Possible knockout stage based on ranking
3	Portland Trail Blazers	2	1	1	238	231	+7	
4	Golden State Warriors	2	1	1	197	218	−21	
5	Sacramento Kings	3	0	3	320	350	−30	

Updated to game(s) played on November 20, 2026. Source:

== Transactions ==
=== Trades ===
Date	Trade		Ref.
June 23, 2026	To Sacramento Kings: Draft rights to Alex Karaban	To Cleveland Cavaliers: 2026 SAC second-round pick (No. 34); 2032 SAC second-round pick	
June 30, 2026	To Sacramento Kings: Draft rights to Alpha Kaba (2017 No. 60)	To Atlanta Hawks: Devin Carter; 2033 SAC second-round pick	

=== Free agency ===
==== Re-signed ====
Date	Player	Ref.
July 2, 2026	Daeqwon Plowden	
July 7, 2026	Precious Achiuwa	

==== Additions ====
Date	Player	Former Team	Ref.

==== Subtractions ====
Player	Reason	New Team	Ref.
DeMar DeRozan	Waived	Denver Nuggets	
Isaiah Stevens	Waived	Windy City Bulls (NBA G League)	
Russell Westbrook	Retirement	—N/a	
