= 2026–27 Utah Jazz season =

- Head coach: Will Hardy
- President: Austin Ainge
- General manager: Justin Zanik
- Owner: Ryan Smith
- Arena: Delta Center

Results
- Record: 3–14 (.176)
- Place: Division: 5th (Northwest); Conference: 14th (Western)
- Stats at Basketball Reference

Local media
- Television: KJZZ-TV; KUTV; Kiswe (Jazz+)
- Radio: 1280; 97.5 The Zone

The 2026–27 Utah Jazz season will be the 53rd season for the franchise in the National Basketball Association (NBA) and its 48th season in Salt Lake City, Utah. The Jazz entered this season with the #2 pick in the draft, which would be the highest draft selection in years alongside it being the final time where the NBA would utilize the draft lottery system they had at the time since the NBA looked to seriously discourage teams from tanking for higher draft picks by end of the previous season. They used the pick to select guard Darryn Peterson out of Kansas.

The Jazz struggled early in the regular season with a 12-game losing streak, the fourth-longest in franchise history.

== Draft picks ==
Round	Pick	Player	Position	Nationality	College
1	2	Darryn Peterson	PG/SG	United States	Kansas

The Jazz entered the draft holding one first-round selection, which landed 2nd overall—their highest draft spot since matching that position in 1980. They had traded their second-round pick to the Minnesota Timberwolves as part of the 2023 Mike Conley three-team trade, and was ultimately used by the San Antonio Spurs in the draft.

== Roster ==
Utah Jazz roster
Players

Pos.	No.	Player	Height	Weight	DOB	From
C	25	Jonas Aidoo (TW)	6 ft 11 in (2.11 m)	240 lb (109 kg)	2002-12-10	Arkansas
F	19	Ace Bailey	6 ft 9 in (2.06 m)	200 lb (91 kg)	2006-08-13	Rutgers
C	44	Mo Bamba	7 ft 0 in (2.13 m)	231 lb (105 kg)	1998-05-12	Texas
C	13	Tony Bradley	6 ft 10 in (2.08 m)	248 lb (112 kg)	1998-01-08	North Carolina
G	0	Kobe Bufkin (TW)	6 ft 4 in (1.93 m)	195 lb (88 kg)	2003-09-21	Michigan
G	8	Isaiah Collier	6 ft 4 in (1.93 m)	210 lb (95 kg)	2004-10-08	USC
C	2	Kyle Filipowski	6 ft 11 in (2.11 m)	250 lb (113 kg)	2003-10-07	Duke
G	3	Keyonte George	6 ft 5 in (1.96 m)	185 lb (84 kg)	2003-11-08	Baylor
G	5	Josh Green	6 ft 6 in (1.98 m)	200 lb (91 kg)	2000-11-16	Arizona
F/C	11	Jaxson Hayes	7 ft 0 in (2.13 m)	220 lb (100 kg)	2000-05-23	Texas
F	00	Harrison Ingram (TW)	6 ft 5 in (1.96 m)	230 lb (104 kg)	2002-11-27	North Carolina
F/C	20	Jaren Jackson Jr. (injured)	6 ft 10 in (2.08 m)	242 lb (110 kg)	1999-09-15	Michigan State
F/C	23	Lauri Markkanen (injured)	7 ft 1 in (2.16 m)	240 lb (109 kg)	1997-05-22	Arizona
G/F	10	Sviatoslav Mykhailiuk	6 ft 6 in (1.98 m)	205 lb (93 kg)	1997-06-10	Kansas
C	30	Jusuf Nurkić (injured)	7 ft 0 in (2.13 m)	290 lb (132 kg)	1994-08-23	Bosnia and Herzegovina
G	21	Josh Okogie	6 ft 4 in (1.93 m)	213 lb (97 kg)	1998-09-01	Georgia Tech
G	22	Darryn Peterson	6 ft 6 in (1.98 m)	205 lb (93 kg)	2007-01-17	Kansas
F	28	Brice Sensabaugh	6 ft 6 in (1.98 m)	225 lb (102 kg)	2003-10-30	Ohio State

Coaches
Head coach
- Will Hardy
Assistant(s)
- Chad Forcier
- Christopher Jones
- Scott Morrison
- Sean Sheldon
- Jason Terry
- Andrew Warren
- Mike Williams
- Steve Wojciechowski

Legend
- (DP) Unsigned draft pick
- (FA) Free agent
- (S) Suspended
- (GL) On assignment to G League affiliate
- (TW) Two-way affiliate player
- Injured

Roster
Updated: November 17, 2026

== Standings ==
=== Division ===
Northwest Division	W	L	PCT	GB	Home	Road	Div	GP
Minnesota Timberwolves	11	5	.688	–	7‍–‍3	4‍–‍2	3–0	16
Portland Trail Blazers	10	5	.667	0.5	3‍–‍2	7‍–‍3	4–2	15
Denver Nuggets	8	5	.615	1.5	3‍–‍3	5‍–‍2	0–2	13
Oklahoma City Thunder	9	6	.600	1.5	5‍–‍1	4‍–‍5	1–2	15
Utah Jazz	3	13	.188	8.0	1‍–‍7	2‍–‍6	0–2	16

=== Conference ===
Western Conference
#	Team	W	L	PCT	GB	GP
1	San Antonio Spurs *	13	3	.813	–	16
2	Los Angeles Lakers *	13	3	.813	–	16
3	Houston Rockets	12	4	.750	1.0	16
4	Memphis Grizzlies	12	4	.750	1.0	16
5	Minnesota Timberwolves *	11	5	.688	2.0	16
6	Portland Trail Blazers	10	5	.667	2.5	15
7	Denver Nuggets	8	5	.615	3.5	13
8	Oklahoma City Thunder	9	6	.600	3.5	15
9	Dallas Mavericks	8	7	.533	4.5	15
10	Golden State Warriors	8	8	.500	5.0	16
11	Phoenix Suns	7	7	.500	5.0	14
12	New Orleans Pelicans	5	11	.313	8.0	16
13	Los Angeles Clippers	4	10	.286	8.0	14
14	Utah Jazz	3	13	.188	10.0	16
15	Sacramento Kings	1	13	.071	11.0	14

== Game log ==
=== Preseason ===
2026 preseason game log
Total: 3–1 (Home: 1–1; Road: 2–0)
Preseason: 3–1 (home: 1–1; road: 2–0)

Game	Date	Team	Score	High points	High rebounds	High assists	Location Attendance	Record
1	October 4	@ Denver	W 109–97	Lauri Markkanen (17)	Mo Bamba (7)	Tied (4)	CU Events Center; 7,860	1–0
2	October 6	Denver	L 106–117	Darryn Peterson (23)	Mo Bamba (10)	Keyonte George (4)	Delta Center; 13,959	1–1
3	October 12	San Antonio	W 119–109	Darryn Peterson (14)	Mo Bamba (9)	Collier, Peterson (5)	Delta Center; 15,495	2–1
4	October 16	@ Phoenix	W 119–116	Lauri Markkanen (19)	Filipowski, Hayes (7)	Darryn Peterson (6)	Mortgage Matchup Center; 17,071	3–1

2026–27 preseason schedule

=== Regular season ===
2026–27 game log
Total: 3−14 (Home: 1−9; Road: 2−5)
October: 1–5 (home: 1–4; road: 0–1)

Game	Date	Team	Score	High points	High rebounds	High assists	Location Attendance	Record
1	October 21	@ Memphis	L 103–123	Keyonte George (22)	Lauri Markkanen (9)	Keyonte George (5)	FedExForum; 17,276	0−1
2	October 23	New Orleans	W 120–119	Jaren Jackson Jr. (24)	Jaren Jackson Jr. (10)	Keyonte George (10)	Delta Center; 17,867	1–1
3	October 25	L.A. Lakers	L 123–132	Lauri Markkanen (28)	Ace Bailey (12)	Keyonte George (10)	Delta Center; 17,867	1–2
4	October 26	Memphis	L 105–110	Keyonte George (26)	Ace Bailey (10)	Isaiah Collier (8)	Delta Center; 17,867	1–3
5	October 28	San Antonio	L 111–117 (OT)	Keyonte George (31)	Jaxson Hayes (11)	Isaiah Collier (6)	Delta Center; 17,867	1−4
6	October 31	Portland	L 90–117	Darryn Peterson (16)	Bailey, Hayes (7)	Tied (4)	Delta Center; 17,867	1−5

November: 2–9 (home: 0–5; road: 2–4)

Game	Date	Team	Score	High points	High rebounds	High assists	Location Attendance	Record
7	November 2	@ San Antonio	L 97–119	Lauri Markkanen (22)	Bamba, Markkanen (8)	Darryn Peterson (6)	Frost Bank Center; 18,464	1–6
8	November 4	@ New Orleans	L 113–120 (OT)	Keyonte George (39)	Bamba, Markkanen (10)	Keyonte George (9)	Smoothie King Center; 16,875	1−7
9	November 6	@ Dallas	L 100–112	Lauri Markkanen (24)	Lauri Markkanen (8)	Keyonte George (9)	American Airlines Center; 19,568	1−8
10	November 8	@ Minnesota	L 100–115	Darryn Peterson (26)	Tied (6)	Keyonte George (8)	Target Center; 18,029	1−9
11	November 10	Miami	L 109–115	Darryn Peterson (25)	Bailey, Bamba (7)	Isaiah Collier (5)	Delta Center; 17,867	1−10
12	November 11	Orlando	L 108–123	Darryn Peterson (22)	Jaxson Hayes (8)	Keyonte George (7)	Delta Center; 17,867	1−11
13	November 13	Houston	L 118–125	Darryn Peterson (28)	Mo Bamba (9)	Keyonte George (7)	Delta Center; 18,055	1−12
14	November 15	San Antonio	L 102–110	Mo Bamba (26)	Ace Bailey (8)	Keyonte George (8)	Delta Center; 17,867	1−13
15	November 17	@ L.A. Clippers	W 132–107	Brice Sensabaugh (40)	Brice Sensabaugh (11)	Keyonte George (11)	Intuit Dome; 14,716	2−13
16	November 18	@ L.A. Lakers	W 109–97	Keyonte George (30)	Mo Bamba (16)	Keyonte George (10)	Crypto.com Arena; 19,057	3−13
17	November 20	Phoenix	L 101–111	Darryn Peterson (20)	Jaxson Hayes (14)	Darryn Peterson (8)	Delta Center; 17,867	3−14
18	November 22	Dallas					Delta Center	−
19	November 23	@ L.A. Lakers					Crypto.com Arena	−
20	November 27	Denver					Delta Center	−
21	November 29	Phoenix					Delta Center	−

December: 0–0 (home: 0–0; road: 0–0)

Game	Date	Team	Score	High points	High rebounds	High assists	Location Attendance	Record
22	December 1	@ Golden State					Chase Center	−
23	December 3	@ Portland					Moda Center	−
24	TBD	TBD					TBD	−
25	TBD	TBD					TBD	−
26	December 12	Denver					Delta Center	−
27	December 14	Minnesota					Delta Center	−
28	December 16	@ Chicago					United Center	−
29	December 18	@ Boston					TD Garden	−
30	December 20	@ Cleveland					Rocket Arena	−
31	December 23	@ New York					Madison Square Garden	−
32	December 26	Indiana					Delta Center	−
33	December 27	@ Sacramento					Golden 1 Center	−
34	December 30	New York					Delta Center	−

January: 0–0 (home: 0–0; road: 0–0)

Game	Date	Team	Score	High points	High rebounds	High assists	Location Attendance	Record
35	January 1	Boston					Delta Center	−
36	January 2	@ Oklahoma City					Paycom Center	−
37	January 4	Brooklyn					Delta Center	−
38	January 6	@ Brooklyn					Barclays Center	−
39	January 8	@ Toronto					Scotiabank Arena	−
40	January 10	@ Detroit					Little Caesars Arena	−
41	January 12	Chicago					Delta Center	−
42	January 14	Charlotte					Delta Center	−
43	January 15	@ Oklahoma City					Paycom Center	−
44	January 17	Sacramento					Delta Center	−
45	January 19	@ Denver					Ball Arena	−
46	January 20	L.A. Clippers					Delta Center	−
47	January 22	@ Phoenix					Mortgage Matchup Center	−
48	January 24	@ Phoenix					Mortgage Matchup Center	−
49	January 26	Milwaukee					Delta Center	−
50	January 28	Golden State					Delta Center	−
51	January 30	Memphis					Delta Center	−

February: 0–0 (home: 0–0; road: 0–0)

Game	Date	Team	Score	High points	High rebounds	High assists	Location Attendance	Record
52	February 1	Cleveland					Delta Center	−
53	February 3	@ Houston					Toyota Center	−
54	February 6	@ Dallas					American Airlines Center	−
55	February 7	@ Minnesota					Target Center	−
56	February 9	Houston					Delta Center	−
57	February 11	@ Indiana					Gainbridge Fieldhouse	−
58	February 15	Detroit					Delta Center	−
59	February 17	@ Denver					Ball Arena	−
All-Star Game
60	February 25	@ L.A. Clippers					Intuit Dome	−
61	February 27	Washington					Delta Center	−

March: 0–0 (home: 0–0; road: 0–0)

Game	Date	Team	Score	High points	High rebounds	High assists	Location Attendance	Record
62	March 1	@ New Orleans					Smoothie King Center	−
63	March 3	@ Milwaukee					Fiserv Forum	−
64	March 5	@ Orlando					Kia Center	−
65	March 6	@ Washington					Capital One Arena	−
66	March 8	@ Philadelphia					Xfinity Mobile Arena	−
67	March 10	Houston					Delta Center	−
68	March 12	Sacramento					Delta Center	−
69	March 17	Atlanta					Delta Center	−
70	March 18	Minnesota					Delta Center	−
71	March 21	Toronto					Delta Center	−
72	March 23	Philadelphia					Delta Center	−
73	March 25	@ Miami					Kaseya Center	−
74	March 27	@ Atlanta					State Farm Arena	−
75	March 28	@ Charlotte					Spectrum Center	−
76	March 30	Oklahoma City					Delta Center	−

April: 0–0 (home: 0–0; road: 0–0)

Game	Date	Team	Score	High points	High rebounds	High assists	Location Attendance	Record
77	April 2	@ Portland					Moda Center	−
78	April 4	Portland					Delta Center	−
79	April 6	Oklahoma City					Delta Center	−
80	April 8	New Orleans					Delta Center	−
81	April 9	L.A. Clippers					Delta Center	−
82	April 11	@ Golden State					Chase Center	−

2026–27 season schedule

== NBA Cup ==
=== West Group A ===
Pos	Team	Pld	W	L	PF	PA	PD	Qualification
1	Dallas Mavericks	2	2	0	228	211	+17	Advance to knockout stage
2	Denver Nuggets	2	2	0	260	244	+16	Possible knockout stage based on ranking
3	Phoenix Suns	2	1	1	231	228	+3	
4	Houston Rockets	3	1	2	360	367	−7	
5	Utah Jazz	3	0	3	319	348	−29	

Updated to game(s) played on November 20, 2026. Source:

== Transactions ==
=== Trades ===
Date	Trade		Ref.
July 8, 2026	To Utah Jazz: 2028 first-round pick swap right; 2030 first-round pick swap right; 2031 LAL first-round pick; 2033 LAL first-round pick	To Los Angeles Lakers: Walker Kessler (sign-and-trade)	
August 29, 2026	To Utah Jazz: Josh Green	To Minnesota Timberwolves: John Konchar; Cody Williams; Cash considerations	

=== Free agency ===
==== Re-signed ====
Date	Player	Ref.

==== Additions ====
Date	Player	Former Team	Ref.

==== Subtractions ====
Player	Reason	New Team	Ref.
