= 2026–27 Miami Heat season =

- Head coach: Erik Spoelstra
- President: Pat Riley
- General manager: Andy Elisburg
- Owner: Micky Arison
- Arena: Kaseya Center

Results
- Record: 9–6 (.600)
- Place: Division: 2nd (Southeast); Conference: 6th (Eastern)
- Stats at Basketball Reference

Local media
- Television: WPLG
- Radio: WQAM

The 2026–27 Miami Heat season is the 39th season for the franchise in the National Basketball Association (NBA). On July 6, the Heat acquired superstar forward Giannis Antetokounmpo in a trade with the Milwaukee Bucks and it will be his first season with Miami Heat. The team also acquired Bobby Portis in the same trade, followed by the signing of veteran guard Klay Thompson in August.

== Draft picks ==
Round	Pick	Player	Position	Nationality	College
1	13	Nate Ament	SF	United States	Tennessee
2	41	Otega Oweh	SG	United States	Kentucky

The Heat entered the draft holding one first-round selection and one second-round selection. The second-round pick originally belonged to the Golden State Warriors and was retroactively acquired from the Charlotte Hornets as the more favorable selection than the Denver Nuggets, owing to Charlotte's worse 2025–26 record, to resolve a dispute regarding a 2024 trade for Terry Rozier while he faced an investigation on alleged gambling conspiracy. The Heat's original second-round selection was previously traded to the Indiana Pacers before it ultimately landed with the San Antonio Spurs via a pick swap that was triggered because Miami finished with a better 2025–26 record than Indiana, resulting in San Antonio receiving this less favorable pick.

The Heat used both selections to draft Nate Ament and Otega Oweh, but later traded their draft rights to the Milwaukee Bucks (as part of the Giannis Antetokounmpo trade) and the Oklahoma City Thunder (in exchange for the draft rights to 37th pick Ryan Conwell), respectively.

== Roster ==
Miami Heat roster
Players

Pos.	No.	Player	Height	Weight	DOB	From
F/C	13	Bam Adebayo	6 ft 9 in (2.06 m)	260 lb (118 kg)	1997-07-18	Kentucky
F	7	Giannis Antetokounmpo	6 ft 11 in (2.11 m)	250 lb (113 kg)	1994-12-06	Greece
G	4	Ryan Conwell	6 ft 2 in (1.88 m)	215 lb (98 kg)	2004-06-15	Louisville
G	24	Tre Donaldson (TW)	6 ft 1 in (1.85 m)	200 lb (91 kg)	2003-12-11	Miami (FL)
F	0	Simone Fontecchio	6 ft 7 in (2.01 m)	220 lb (100 kg)	1995-12-09	Italy
F	15	Myron Gardner	6 ft 5 in (1.96 m)	225 lb (102 kg)	2001-05-21	Little Rock
C	50	Vladislav Goldin (TW)	7 ft 0 in (2.13 m)	255 lb (116 kg)	2001-05-12	Michigan
G	10	Tim Hardaway Jr.	6 ft 6 in (1.98 m)	205 lb (93 kg)	1992-03-16	Michigan
F	16	Keshad Johnson (TW)	6 ft 6 in (1.98 m)	230 lb (104 kg)	2001-06-23	Arizona
F	5	Nikola Jović	6 ft 10 in (2.08 m)	245 lb (111 kg)	2003-06-09	Serbia
G	9	Pelle Larsson	6 ft 5 in (1.96 m)	215 lb (98 kg)	2001-02-23	Arizona
G	2	Davion Mitchell	6 ft 0 in (1.83 m)	200 lb (91 kg)	1998-09-05	Baylor
F	95	Bobby Portis	6 ft 9 in (2.06 m)	250 lb (113 kg)	1995-02-10	Arkansas
C	8	Nick Richards	6 ft 11 in (2.11 m)	255 lb (116 kg)	1997-11-29	Kentucky
G	12	Dru Smith	6 ft 2 in (1.88 m)	200 lb (91 kg)	1997-12-30	Missouri
G/F	11	Klay Thompson	6 ft 6 in (1.98 m)	220 lb (100 kg)	1990-02-08	Washington State
F	22	Andrew Wiggins	6 ft 7 in (2.01 m)	210 lb (95 kg)	1995-02-23	Kansas

Coaches
Head coach
- Erik Spoelstra
Assistant(s)
- Malik Allen
- Vin Baker
- Caron Butler
- Octavio De La Grana
- Wayne Ellington
- Eric Glass
- Chris Quinn

Legend
- (DP) Unsigned draft pick
- (FA) Free agent
- (S) Suspended
- (GL) On assignment to G League affiliate
- (TW) Two-way affiliate player
- Injured

Roster
Updated: October 17, 2026

== Standings ==
=== Division ===
Southeast Division	W	L	PCT	GB	Home	Road	Div	GP
Atlanta Hawks	10	6	.625	–	4‍–‍3	6‍–‍3	5–1	16
Miami Heat	9	6	.600	0.5	5‍–‍3	4‍–‍3	1–1	15
Orlando Magic	7	8	.467	2.5	1‍–‍5	6‍–‍3	0–2	15
Washington Wizards	6	11	.353	4.5	2‍–‍5	4‍–‍6	2–3	17
Charlotte Hornets	4	11	.267	5.5	3‍–‍4	1‍–‍7	2–3	15

=== Conference ===
Eastern Conference
#	Team	W	L	PCT	GB	GP
1	Philadelphia 76ers *	13	3	.813	–	16
2	Boston Celtics	11	4	.733	1.5	15
3	Detroit Pistons *	10	5	.667	2.5	15
4	Atlanta Hawks *	10	6	.625	3.0	16
5	Miami Heat	9	6	.600	3.5	15
6	New York Knicks	9	6	.600	3.5	15
7	Cleveland Cavaliers	9	8	.529	4.5	17
8	Orlando Magic	7	8	.467	5.5	15
9	Toronto Raptors	6	10	.375	7.0	16
10	Washington Wizards	6	11	.353	7.5	17
11	Indiana Pacers	5	11	.313	8.0	16
12	Charlotte Hornets	4	11	.267	8.5	15
13	Chicago Bulls	4	11	.267	8.5	15
14	Brooklyn Nets	3	12	.200	9.5	15
15	Milwaukee Bucks	1	15	.063	12.0	16

== Game log ==
=== Preseason ===
2026 preseason game log
Total: 3–2 (Home: 2–1; Road: 1–1)
Preseason: 3–2 (home: 2–1; road: 1–1)

Game	Date	Team	Score	High points	High rebounds	High assists	Location Attendance	Record
1	October 3	@ Toronto	W 129–105	Tim Hardaway, Jr. (14)	Jović, Richards (7)	Giannis Antetokounmpo (7)	(Canada) Centre Vidéotron; 18,474	1–0
2	October 8	New Orleans	W 128–118	Giannis Antetokounmpo (18)	Nick Richards (9)	Davion Mitchell (7)	Kaseya Center; 19,600	2–0
3	October 10	Minnesota	L 124–125	Ryan Conwell (22)	Nick Richards (10)	Ryan Conwell (9)	Kaseya Center; 19,600	2–1
4	October 14	Brooklyn	W 144–128	Giannis Antetokounmpo (20)	Giannis Antetokounmpo (15)	Giannis Antetokounmpo (9)	Kaseya Center; 19,600	3–1
5	October 16	@ Orlando	L 115–136	Ryan Conwell (21)	Nick Richards (11)	Ryan Conwell (7)	Kia Center; 18,846	3–2

2026–27 preseason schedule

=== Regular season ===
2026–27 game log
Total: 9–6 (Home: 5–3; Road: 4–3)
October: 2–4 (home: 1–3; road: 1–1)

Game	Date	Team	Score	High points	High rebounds	High assists	Location Attendance	Record
1	October 21	Minnesota	L 106–131	Giannis Antetokounmpo (35)	Bam Adebayo (7)	Davion Mitchell (11)	Kaseya Center; 19,837	0–1
2	October 23	Detroit	L 111–128	Giannis Antetokounmpo (36)	Giannis Antetokounmpo (12)	Antetokounmpo, Mitchell (5)	Kaseya Center; 19,616	0–2
3	October 24	@ Charlotte	L 110–115	Davion Mitchell (22)	Adebayo, Portis (8)	Davion Mitchell (10)	Spectrum Center; 19,611	0–3
4	October 26	Dallas	L 109–113	Giannis Antetokounmpo (29)	Giannis Antetokounmpo (15)	Giannis Antetokounmpo (11)	Kaseya Center; 19,611	0–4
5	October 28	@ Atlanta	W 129–117	Adebayo, Antetokounmpo (24)	Giannis Antetokounmpo (18)	Davion Mitchell (10)	State Farm Arena; 15,028	1–4
6	October 30	Indiana	W 145–125	Giannis Antetokounmpo (31)	Giannis Antetokounmpo (17)	Davion Mitchell (11)	Kaseya Center; 19,653	2–4

November: 7–2 (home: 4–0; road: 3–2)

Game	Date	Team	Score	High points	High rebounds	High assists	Location Attendance	Record
7	November 2	@ L.A. Lakers	L 117–138	Giannis Antetokounmpo (30)	Giannis Antetokounmpo (12)	Antetokounmpo, Mitchell (7)	Crypto.com Arena; 18,752	2–5
8	November 4	@ L.A. Clippers	W 117–116 (OT)	Bam Adebayo (35)	Giannis Antetokounmpo (13)	Davion Mitchell (10)	Intuit Dome; 17,504	3–5
9	November 5	@ Golden State	L 100–120	Davion Mitchell (22)	Giannis Antetokounmpo (14)	Davion Mitchell (8)	Chase Center; 18,064	3–6
10	November 8	@ Sacramento	W 114–108	Giannis Antetokounmpo (29)	Giannis Antetokounmpo (14)	Davion Mitchell (11)	Golden 1 Center; 13,016	4–6
11	November 10	@ Utah	W 115–109	Giannis Antetokounmpo (30)	Giannis Antetokounmpo (11)	Davion Mitchell (8)	Delta Center; 17,867	5–6
12	November 13	Cleveland	W 133–121	Adebayo, Antetokounmpo (37)	Bam Adebayo (14)	Davion Mitchell (17)	Kaseya Center; 19,646	6–6
13	November 14	Detroit	W 137–117	Giannis Antetokounmpo (34)	Giannis Antetokounmpo (14)	Davion Mitchell (9)	Kaseya Center; 19,658	7–6
14	November 16	Houston	W 128–110	Giannis Antetokounmpo (20)	Giannis Antetokounmpo (13)	Davion Mitchell (10)	Kaseya Center; 19,662	8–6
15	November 18	Milwaukee	W 137–130	Giannis Antetokounmpo (27)	Giannis Antetokounmpo (14)	Giannis Antetokounmpo (9)	Kaseya Center; 20,253	9–6
16	November 22	Oklahoma City					Kaseya Center	–
17	November 25	Philadelphia					Kaseya Center	–
18	November 27	@ New York					Madison Square Garden	–
19	November 29	@ Cleveland					Rocket Arena	–

December: 0–0 (home: 0–0; road: 0–0)

Game	Date	Team	Score	High points	High rebounds	High assists	Location Attendance	Record
20	December 1	Atlanta					Kaseya Center	–
21	December 3	Washington					Kaseya Center	–
22	TBD	TBD					TBD	–
23	TBD	TBD					TBD	–
24	December 12	New York					Kaseya Center	–
25	December 14	@ Chicago					United Center	–
26	December 16	@ Memphis					FedExForum	–
27	December 18	L.A. Clippers					Kaseya Center	–
28	December 20	Sacramento					Kaseya Center	–
29	December 21	Chicago					Kaseya Center	–
30	December 23	Chicago					Kaseya Center	–
31	December 25	@ Boston					TD Garden	–
32	December 27	Charlotte					Kaseya Center	–
33	December 29	@ Dallas					American Airlines Center	–
34	December 31	@ Oklahoma City					Paycom Center	–

January: 0–0 (home: 0–0; road: 0–0)

Game	Date	Team	Score	High points	High rebounds	High assists	Location Attendance	Record
35	January 2	@ New Orleans					Smoothie King Center	–
36	January 5	Memphis					Kaseya Center	–
37	January 7	@ Brooklyn					Barclays Center	–
38	January 8	@ Philadelphia					Xfinity Mobile Arena	–
39	January 10	New Orleans					Kaseya Center	–
40	January 12	Brooklyn					Kaseya Center	–
41	January 14	@ New York					Madison Square Garden	–
42	January 15	@ Toronto					Scotiabank Arena	–
43	January 17	Golden State					Kaseya Center	–
44	January 19	Portland					Kaseya Center	–
45	January 20	@ San Antonio					Frost Bank Center	–
46	January 23	Atlanta					Kaseya Center	–
47	January 25	@ Brooklyn					Barclays Center	–
48	January 28	@ Milwaukee					Fiserv Forum	–
49	January 30	Philadelphia					Kaseya Center	–

February: 0–0 (home: 0–0; road: 0–0)

Game	Date	Team	Score	High points	High rebounds	High assists	Location Attendance	Record
50	February 1	@ Indiana					Gainbridge Fieldhouse	–
51	February 2	Charlotte					Kaseya Center	–
52	February 4	Milwaukee					Kaseya Center	–
53	February 6	@ Minnesota					Target Center	–
54	February 8	@ Atlanta					State Farm Arena	–
55	February 10	@ Washington					Capital One Arena	–
56	February 12	@ Orlando					Kia Center	–
57	February 14	Brooklyn					Kaseya Center	–
58	February 15	San Antonio					Kaseya Center	–
59	February 17	@ Washington					Capital One Arena	–
All-Star Game
60	February 25	@ Detroit					Little Caesars Arena	–
61	February 28	@ Houston					Toyota Center	–

March: 0–0 (home: 0–0; road: 0–0)

Game	Date	Team	Score	High points	High rebounds	High assists	Location Attendance	Record
62	March 2	Toronto					Kaseya Center	–
63	March 3	Toronto					Kaseya Center	–
64	March 6	Indiana					Kaseya Center	–
65	March 8	Phoenix					Kaseya Center	–
66	March 10	Orlando					Kaseya Center	–
67	March 12	@ Milwaukee					Fiserv Forum	–
68	March 14	@ Denver					Ball Arena	–
69	March 17	@ Portland					Moda Center	–
70	March 19	@ Phoenix					Mortgage Matchup Center	–
71	March 21	Denver					Kaseya Center	–
72	March 23	L.A. Lakers					Kaseya Center	–
73	March 25	Utah					Kaseya Center	–
74	March 27	Boston					Kaseya Center	–
75	March 29	@ Cleveland					Rocket Arena	–
76	March 30	@ Charlotte					Spectrum Center	–

April: 0–0 (home: 0–0; road: 0–0)

Game	Date	Team	Score	High points	High rebounds	High assists	Location Attendance	Record
77	April 2	@ Boston					TD Garden	–
78	April 4	@ Detroit					Little Caesars Arena	–
79	April 5	@ Orlando					Kia Center	–
80	April 8	Philadelphia					Kaseya Center	–
81	April 9	Washington					Kaseya Center	–
82	April 11	Orlando					Kaseya Center	–

2026–27 season schedule

== NBA Cup ==
=== East Group B ===
Pos	Team	Pld	W	L	PF	PA	PD	Qualification
1	Miami Heat	2	2	0	278	246	+32	Advance to knockout stage
2	Cleveland Cavaliers	3	2	1	368	347	+21	Possible knockout stage based on ranking
3	Philadelphia 76ers	2	1	1	193	212	−19	
4	Indiana Pacers	3	1	2	350	377	−27	
5	New York Knicks	2	0	2	197	204	−7	

Updated to game(s) played on November 20, 2026. Source:

== Transactions ==
=== Trades ===
Date	Trade		Ref.
June 24, 2026	To Miami Heat: Draft rights to Ryan Conwell (No. 37)	To Oklahoma City Thunder: Draft rights to Otega Oweh (No. 41); Cash considerations	
July 6, 2026	To Miami Heat: Giannis Antetokounmpo; Bobby Portis	To Milwaukee Bucks: Tyler Herro; Kasparas Jakučionis; Jaime Jaquez Jr.; Kel'el Ware; Draft rights to Nate Ament (No. 13); 2030 first-round pick swap right (Note: Milwaukee may swap their own pick for Miami's own pick.); 2031 MIA first-round pick; 2033 MIA first-round pick; 2033 MIA second-round pick	

=== Free agency ===
==== Re-signed ====
Date	Player	Ref.
July 2, 2026	Simone Fontecchio	

==== Additions ====
Date	Player	Former Team	Ref.
July 6, 2026	Tim Hardaway Jr.	Denver Nuggets	
August 23, 2026	Klay Thompson	Dallas Mavericks	
August 27, 2026	Nick Richards	Chicago Bulls	

==== Subtractions ====
Player	Reason	New Team	Ref.
Norman Powell	Free agency	Chicago Bulls	
