= 2026–27 Oklahoma City Thunder season =

- Head coach: Mark Daigneault
- President: Sam Presti
- General manager: Sam Presti
- Owners: Professional Basketball Club LLC; Clay Bennett (chairman)
- Arena: Paycom Center

Results
- Record: 10–6 (.625)
- Place: Division: 4th (Northwest); Conference: 8th (Western)
- Stats at Basketball Reference

Local media
- Television: Griffin Media
- Radio: KWPN and WWLS-FM

The 2026–27 Oklahoma City Thunder season is the 19th season of the franchise in Oklahoma City and the 60th in the National Basketball Association (NBA). The Thunder will attempt to defend their division championship from the previous season.

The Thunder will retire Russell Westbrook's jersey number 0 when they play the New York Knicks on February 7, 2027.

== Draft picks ==
Round	Pick	Player	Position	Nationality	College
1	12	Aday Mara	C	Spain	Michigan
1	17	Ebuka Okorie	PG	United States	Stanford
2	37	Ryan Conwell	SG	United States	Louisville

The Thunder entered the draft holding two first-round selections and one second-round selection, all acquired through previous trades. The lottery selection that landed 12th was obtained from the Los Angeles Clippers as the final asset from the 2019 Shai Gilgeous-Alexander trade. Meanwhile, the mid-first-round selection was acquired from the Philadelphia 76ers as part of a 2020 trade, finally conveyed when Philadelphia qualified for the 2026 NBA playoffs after being deferred from 2025 due to landing within its top-six protection range. The second-round selection was acquired from the Dallas Mavericks in another 2020 trade. The Thunder had traded their original first- and second-round selections to Philadelphia (later conveyed to Dallas) and the Miami Heat (later conveyed to the Washington Wizards), respectively, both of which became the least favorable selections due to the Thunder clinching the previous season's league-best record.

== Roster ==
Oklahoma City Thunder roster
Players

Pos.	No.	Player	Height	Weight	DOB	From
G	23	Brooks Barnhizer (TW)	6 ft 5 in (1.96 m)	230 lb (104 kg)	2002-03-02	Northwestern
G	9	Alex Caruso	6 ft 5 in (1.96 m)	186 lb (84 kg)	1994-02-28	Texas A&M
G	18	Nique Clifford	6 ft 5 in (1.96 m)	210 lb (95 kg)	2002-02-09	Colorado State
G	21	Josh Dix (TW)	6 ft 5 in (1.96 m)	213 lb (97 kg)	2004-06-29	Creighton
G	2	Shai Gilgeous-Alexander	6 ft 6 in (1.98 m)	195 lb (88 kg)	1998-07-12	Kentucky
F/C	55	Isaiah Hartenstein	7 ft 0 in (2.13 m)	250 lb (113 kg)	1998-05-05	Germany
F/C	7	Chet Holmgren (injured)	7 ft 1 in (2.16 m)	208 lb (94 kg)	2002-05-01	Gonzaga
C	15	Aday Mara	7 ft 3 in (2.21 m)	255 lb (116 kg)	2005-04-07	Michigan
G	3	Jared McCain	6 ft 2 in (1.88 m)	195 lb (88 kg)	2004-02-20	Duke
G	25	Ajay Mitchell	6 ft 4 in (1.93 m)	190 lb (86 kg)	2002-06-25	UC Santa Barbara
G/F	16	Micah Peavy (TW)	6 ft 6 in (1.98 m)	215 lb (98 kg)	2001-07-16	Georgetown
C	12	Thomas Sorber (injured)	6 ft 9 in (2.06 m)	250 lb (113 kg)	2005-12-25	Georgetown
G	14	Bennett Stirtz	6 ft 3 in (1.91 m)	180 lb (82 kg)	2003-10-03	Iowa
G	44	Nikola Topić	6 ft 6 in (1.98 m)	200 lb (91 kg)	2005-08-10	Serbia
G	22	Cason Wallace (injured)	6 ft 3 in (1.91 m)	195 lb (88 kg)	2003-11-07	Kentucky
G/F	8	Jalen Williams (injured)	6 ft 5 in (1.96 m)	211 lb (96 kg)	2001-04-14	Santa Clara
F	6	Jaylin Williams	6 ft 9 in (2.06 m)	240 lb (109 kg)	2002-06-29	Arkansas
G/F	34	Kenrich Williams	6 ft 7 in (2.01 m)	210 lb (95 kg)	1994-12-02	TCU

Coaches
Head coach
- Mark Daigneault
Assistant(s)
- Bryce Alford
- David Akinyooye
- Dave Bliss
- Grant Gibbs
- Connor Johnson
- Eric Maynor
- Zoe Vernon
- Mike Wilks
- Kameron Woods

Legend
- (DP) Unsigned draft pick
- (FA) Free agent
- (S) Suspended
- (GL) On assignment to G League affiliate
- (TW) Two-way affiliate player
- Injured

Roster
Updated: November 4, 2026

== Standings ==
=== Division ===
Northwest Division	W	L	PCT	GB	Home	Road	Div	GP
Minnesota Timberwolves	11	5	.688	–	7‍–‍3	4‍–‍2	3–0	16
Portland Trail Blazers	10	5	.667	0.5	3‍–‍2	7‍–‍3	4–2	15
Denver Nuggets	8	5	.615	1.5	3‍–‍3	5‍–‍2	0–2	13
Oklahoma City Thunder	9	6	.600	1.5	5‍–‍1	4‍–‍5	1–2	15
Utah Jazz	3	13	.188	8.0	1‍–‍7	2‍–‍6	0–2	16

=== Conference ===
Western Conference
#	Team	W	L	PCT	GB	GP
1	San Antonio Spurs *	13	3	.813	–	16
2	Los Angeles Lakers *	13	3	.813	–	16
3	Houston Rockets	12	4	.750	1.0	16
4	Memphis Grizzlies	12	4	.750	1.0	16
5	Minnesota Timberwolves *	11	5	.688	2.0	16
6	Portland Trail Blazers	10	5	.667	2.5	15
7	Denver Nuggets	8	5	.615	3.5	13
8	Oklahoma City Thunder	9	6	.600	3.5	15
9	Dallas Mavericks	8	7	.533	4.5	15
10	Golden State Warriors	8	8	.500	5.0	16
11	Phoenix Suns	7	7	.500	5.0	14
12	New Orleans Pelicans	5	11	.313	8.0	16
13	Los Angeles Clippers	4	10	.286	8.0	14
14	Utah Jazz	3	13	.188	10.0	16
15	Sacramento Kings	1	13	.071	11.0	14

== Game log ==
=== Preseason ===
2026 preseason game log
Total: 1–4 (Home: 1–2; Road: 0–2)
Preseason: 1–4 (home: 1–2; road: 0–2)

Game	Date	Team	Score	High points	High rebounds	High assists	Location Attendance	Record
1	October 6	New Orleans	L 110–116	Bennett Stirtz (15)	Aday Mara (9)	Bennett Stirtz (6)	BOK Center	0–1
2	October 7	Milwaukee	L 126–128	Aday Mara (22)	Aday Mara (6)	Wallace, Jal. Williams (6)	Paycom Center	0–2
3	October 12	@ Atlanta	L 110–113	Bennett Stirtz (26)	Mara, Oweh (10)	Josh Dix (7)	State Farm Arena; 15,446	0–3
4	October 13	Indiana	W 114–112 (OT)	Jared McCain (20)	Josh Dix (7)	Shai Gilgeous-Alexander (6)	Paycom Center	1–3
5	October 15	@ Houston	L 89–116	Jalen Williams (18)	Aday Mara (9)	Shai Gilgeous-Alexander (3)	Toyota Center; 16,605	1–4

2026–27 preseason schedule

=== Regular season ===
2026–27 game log
Total: 10–6 (Home: 6–1; Road: 4–5)
October: 4–2 (home: 3–0; road: 1–2)

Game	Date	Team	Score	High points	High rebounds	High assists	Location Attendance	Record
1	October 20	@ San Antonio	W 116–104	Shai Gilgeous-Alexander (32)	Holmgren, Ja. Williams (7)	Ajay Mitchell (6)	Frost Bank Center; 19,160	1−0
2	October 22	Denver	W 96–84	Jalen Williams (21)	Chet Holmgren (17)	Alex Caruso (5)	Paycom Center; 18,203	2−0
3	October 25	L.A. Clippers	W 108–101	Shai Gilgeous-Alexander (34)	Isaiah Hartenstein (12)	Alex Caruso (6)	Paycom Center; 18,203	3–0
4	October 26	Phoenix	W 125–114	Ajay Mitchell (30)	Isaiah Hartenstein (13)	Ajay Mitchell (5)	Paycom Center; 18,203	4–0
5	October 28	@ Dallas	L 96–120	Ajay Mitchell (29)	Isaiah Hartenstein (14)	Jared McCain (4)	American Airlines Center; 18,111	4–1
6	October 31	@ Houston	L 98–119	Shai Gilgeous-Alexander (26)	Aday Mara (9)	Ajay Mitchell (5)	Toyota Center; 18,055	4–2

November: 6–4 (home: 3–1; road: 3–3)

Game	Date	Team	Score	High points	High rebounds	High assists	Location Attendance	Record
7	November 2	@ Cleveland	W 117–112	Shai Gilgeous-Alexander (43)	Isaiah Hartenstein (14)	Shai Gilgeous-Alexander (8)	Rocket Arena; 19,432	5–2
8	November 4	Cleveland	W 124–116	Shai Gilgeous-Alexander (42)	Isaiah Hartenstein (12)	Shai Gilgeous-Alexander (8)	Paycom Center; 18,203	6–2
9	November 6	@ Memphis	W 128–97	Ajay Mitchell (35)	Aday Mara (7)	Isaiah Hartenstein (7)	FedExForum; 16,197	7–2
10	November 7	Washington	W 114–75	Shai Gilgeous-Alexander (30)	Isaiah Hartenstein (14)	Shai Gilgeous-Alexander (9)	Paycom Center; 18,203	8–2
11	November 10	@ Portland	L 103–123	Shai Gilgeous-Alexander (26)	Aday Mara (10)	Isaiah Hartenstein (5)	Moda Center; 19,367	8–3
12	November 11	@ Portland	L 108–118	Shai Gilgeous-Alexander (31)	Isaiah Hartenstein (11)	Isaiah Hartenstein (6)	Moda Center; 19,851	8–4
13	November 13	@ L.A. Clippers	L 112–113	Shai Gilgeous-Alexander (40)	Isaiah Hartenstein (16)	Isaiah Hartenstein (6)	Intuit Dome; 17,927	8–5
14	November 15	Sacramento	W 125–103	Shai Gilgeous-Alexander (37)	Aday Mara (13)	Ajay Mitchell (5)	Paycom Center; 13,021	9–5
15	November 18	Atlanta	L 112–117	Shai Gilgeous-Alexander (34)	Isaiah Hartenstein (17)	Aday Mara (8)	Paycom Center; 18,203	9–6
16	November 20	New Orleans	W 126–120	Shai Gilgeous-Alexander (40)	Aday Mara (16)	Shai Gilgeous-Alexander (8)	Paycom Center; 18,203	10–6
17	November 22	@ Miami					Kaseya Center	–
18	November 23	@ Indiana					Gainbridge Fieldhouse	–
19	November 25	Minnesota					Paycom Center	–
20	November 28	@ Milwaukee					Fiserv Forum	–
21	November 30	@ Brooklyn					Barclays Center	–

December: 0–0 (home: 0–0; road: 0–0)

Game	Date	Team	Score	High points	High rebounds	High assists	Location Attendance	Record
22	December 2	Brooklyn					Paycom Center	–
23	TBD	TBD					TBD	–
24	TBD	TBD					TBD	–
25	December 13	Toronto					Paycom Center	–
26	December 16	Sacramento					Paycom Center	–
27	December 18	@ Charlotte					Spectrum Center	–
28	December 20	@ Atlanta					State Farm Arena	–
29	December 22	Detroit					Paycom Center	–
30	December 23	@ New Orleans					Smoothie King Center	–
31	December 25	@ Minnesota					Target Center	–
32	December 27	@ Houston					Toyota Center	–
33	December 29	Milwaukee					Paycom Center	–
34	December 31	Miami					Paycom Center	–

January: 0–0 (home: 0–0; road: 0–0)

Game	Date	Team	Score	High points	High rebounds	High assists	Location Attendance	Record
35	January 2	Utah					Paycom Center	–
36	January 3	Sacramento					Paycom Center	–
37	January 6	@ Philadelphia					Xfinity Mobile Arena	–
38	January 7	@ Washington					Capital One Arena	–
39	January 10	@ Orlando					Kia Center	–
40	January 13	Houston					Paycom Center	–
41	January 15	Utah					Paycom Center	–
42	January 17	Portland					Paycom Center	–
43	January 18	@ Dallas					American Airlines Center	–
44	January 20	@ New Orleans					Smoothie King Center	–
45	January 22	Memphis					Paycom Center	–
46	January 24	@ Golden State					Chase Center	–
47	January 26	@ L.A. Lakers					Crypto.com Arena	–
48	January 28	Memphis					Paycom Center	–
49	January 30	Denver					Paycom Center	–
50	January 31	Chicago					Paycom Center	–

February: 0–0 (home: 0–0; road: 0–0)

Game	Date	Team	Score	High points	High rebounds	High assists	Location Attendance	Record
51	February 2	@ Denver					Ball Arena	–
52	February 4	@ Chicago					United Center	–
53	February 5	Indiana					Paycom Center	–
54	February 7	New York					Paycom Center	–
55	February 9	Portland					Paycom Center	–
56	February 11	San Antonio					Paycom Center	–
57	February 13	Philadelphia					Paycom Center	–
58	February 15	Orlando					Paycom Center	–
59	February 17	Boston					Paycom Center	–
All-Star Game
60	February 25	@ New York					Madison Square Garden	–
61	February 27	@ Detroit					Little Caesars Arena	–

March: 0–0 (home: 0–0; road: 0–0)

Game	Date	Team	Score	High points	High rebounds	High assists	Location Attendance	Record
62	March 2	Minnesota					Paycom Center	–
63	March 4	@ Sacramento					Golden 1 Center	–
64	March 6	@ L.A. Lakers					Crypto.com Arena	–
65	March 8	Dallas					Paycom Center	–
66	March 10	@ Toronto					Scotiabank Arena	–
67	March 12	@ Boston					TD Garden	–
68	March 14	San Antonio					Paycom Center	–
69	March 16	Charlotte					Paycom Center	–
70	March 17	Dallas					Paycom Center	–
71	March 20	@ Memphis					FedExForum	–
72	March 23	@ Phoenix					Mortgage Matchup Center	–
73	March 24	@ Phoenix					Mortgage Matchup Center	–
74	March 26	L.A. Clippers					Paycom Center	–
75	March 28	Minnesota					Paycom Center	–
76	March 30	@ Utah					Delta Center	–

April: 0–0 (home: 0–0; road: 0–0)

Game	Date	Team	Score	High points	High rebounds	High assists	Location Attendance	Record
77	April 1	@ L.A. Lakers					Crypto.com Arena	–
78	April 3	New Orleans					Paycom Center	–
79	April 6	@ Utah					Delta Center	–
80	April 8	Golden State					Paycom Center	–
81	April 9	Golden State					Paycom Center	–
82	April 11	@ Denver					Ball Arena	–

2026–27 season schedule

== NBA Cup ==
=== West Group B ===
Pos	Team	Pld	W	L	PF	PA	PD	Qualification
1	Minnesota Timberwolves	2	2	0	242	210	+32	Advance to knockout stage
2	Oklahoma City Thunder	3	2	1	366	330	+36	Possible knockout stage based on ranking
3	Los Angeles Clippers	2	1	1	214	239	−25	
4	Memphis Grizzlies	2	1	1	239	239	0	
5	New Orleans Pelicans	3	0	3	340	383	−43	

Updated to game(s) played on November 20, 2026. Source:

== Injuries ==
Player	Duration		Injury	Games missed
Player	Start	End	Injury	Games missed
Thomas Sorber	October 19, 2026		Right Knee Surgery	
Nikola Topić	October 19, 2026	November 7, 2026	Low Back Surgery	9
Jalen Williams	October 25, 2026		Left Ankle Fracture	
Cason Wallace	October 25, 2026		Left Shoulder Labral Tear	
Chet Holmgren	October 25, 2026		Right Patellar Tendinitis	
Alex Caruso	October 27, 2026	November 3, 2026	Right Ankle Sprain	3
Jaylin Williams	November 5, 2026		Low Back Spasms	

== Transactions ==
=== Trades ===
Date	Trade		Ref.
June 23, 2026	To Oklahoma City Thunder: Draft rights to Bennett Stirtz (No. 16)	To Memphis Grizzlies: Draft rights to Ebuka Okorie (No. 17); 2030 second-round pick; 2033 OKC second-round pick	
June 24, 2026	To Oklahoma City Thunder: Draft rights to Otega Oweh (No. 41); Cash considerations	To Miami Heat: Draft rights to Ryan Conwell (No. 37)	
July 6, 2026	To Oklahoma City Thunder: 2030 second-round pick; 2032 second-round pick	To Atlanta Hawks: Aaron Wiggins	
July 6, 2026	To Oklahoma City Thunder: 2030 MIN second-round pick; 2031 DET second-round pick	To Detroit Pistons: Isaiah Joe	
July 19, 2026	Three-team trade		
July 19, 2026	To Oklahoma City Thunder: 2027 CHI second-round pick (from Dallas); 2031 second-round pick (from Atlanta); 2032 second-round pick (from Atlanta)	To Atlanta Hawks: Luguentz Dort (from Oklahoma City); Ryan Nembhard (from Dallas)	
July 19, 2026	To Dallas Mavericks: Zaccharie Risacher (from Atlanta); Protected second-round pick (from Atlanta)		
November 8, 2026	To Oklahoma City Thunder: Nique Clifford	To Sacramento Kings: 2028 UTA second-round pick; 2030 MIN second-round pick	

=== Free agency ===
==== Re-signed ====
Date	Player	Ref.
July 3, 2026	Brooks Barnhizer	
July 6, 2026	Isaiah Hartenstein	
July 6, 2026	Kenrich Williams	

==== Additions ====
Date	Player	Former Team	Ref.

==== Subtractions ====
Player	Reason	New Team	Ref.
Branden Carlson	Free Agent	Portland Trail Blazers	
Payton Sandfort	Waived		
