= 2026–27 Houston Rockets season =

- Head coach: Ime Udoka
- President: Gretchen Sheirr
- General manager: Rafael Stone
- Owner: Tilman Fertitta
- Arena: Toyota Center

Results
- Record: 12–5 (.706)
- Place: Division: 2nd (Southwest); Conference: 4th (Western)
- Stats at Basketball Reference

Local media
- Television: Space City Home Network
- Radio: Sportstalk 790

The 2026–27 Houston Rockets season is the 60th season of the franchise in the National Basketball Association (NBA) and 56th season in the city of Houston. On June 4, 2026, the Rockets rebranded their logo and uniforms, returning to the red and yellow color scheme previously used from 1971 to 1995 and retiring the look that has been in place since 2019–20.

The Rockets started the season with five consecutive wins for the first time since 2014–15.

== Draft picks ==
Round	Pick	Player	Position	Nationality	College
2	39	Jack Kayil	PG	Germany	Alba Berlin (Germany)
2	53	Ugonna Onyenso	C	Nigeria	Virginia

The Rockets entered the draft holding two second-round selections: their original selection, which landed at 53rd, and the 39th overall pick, which was originally owned by the Chicago Bulls and acquired from the Washington Wizards in a 2025 trade. Their first-round selection was traded to the Oklahoma City Thunder as part of the 2019 deal involving Russell Westbrook as it fell outside the top-4 protection when Houston made the 2026 NBA playoffs, which in turn triggered a February 2026 agreement to route the pick to the Philadelphia 76ers based on Houston finishing the 2025–26 season between Oklahoma City and the Los Angeles Clippers in the standings.

They used the selections to draft Jack Kayil and Ugonna Onyenso, then traded their draft rights to the New York Knicks and Detroit Pistons, respectively, as part of a four-team draft-night trade. In return, they acquired the draft rights to the 31st pick, Bruce Thornton, and cash considerations.

== Roster ==
Houston Rockets roster
Players

Pos.	No.	Player	Height	Weight	DOB	From
C	12	Steven Adams	6 ft 11 in (2.11 m)	279 lb (127 kg)	1993-07-20	Pittsburgh
G	31	Bogdan Bogdanović	6 ft 5 in (1.96 m)	231 lb (105 kg)	1992-08-18	Serbia
C	30	Clint Capela (injured)	6 ft 10 in (2.08 m)	256 lb (116 kg)	1994-05-18	Switzerland
G	25	Quadir Copeland (TW)	6 ft 5 in (1.96 m)	214 lb (97 kg)	2003-09-04	NC State
F	27	Isaiah Crawford	6 ft 6 in (1.98 m)	225 lb (102 kg)	2001-11-01	Louisiana Tech
F	7	Kevin Durant	6 ft 11 in (2.11 m)	234 lb (106 kg)	1988-09-29	Texas
F	17	Tari Eason	6 ft 8 in (2.03 m)	229 lb (104 kg)	2001-05-10	LSU
F	3	Julian Phillips (TW)	6 ft 7 in (2.01 m)	205 lb (93 kg)	2003-11-05	Tennessee
C	28	Alperen Şengün	6 ft 11 in (2.11 m)	271 lb (123 kg)	2002-07-25	Turkey
G	15	Reed Sheppard	6 ft 2 in (1.88 m)	189 lb (86 kg)	2004-06-24	Kentucky
G	36	Marcus Smart	6 ft 3 in (1.91 m)	220 lb (100 kg)	1994-03-06	Oklahoma State
F	10	Jabari Smith Jr.	6 ft 11 in (2.11 m)	231 lb (105 kg)	2003-05-13	Auburn
F	8	Jae'Sean Tate	6 ft 4 in (1.93 m)	239 lb (108 kg)	1995-10-28	Ohio State
G/F	1	Amen Thompson	6 ft 7 in (2.01 m)	227 lb (103 kg)	2003-01-30	Pine Crest (FL)
G	2	Bruce Thornton (GL)	6 ft 0 in (1.83 m)	229 lb (104 kg)	2003-09-14	Ohio State
F/C	9	Oscar Tshiebwe (TW)	6 ft 8 in (2.03 m)	270 lb (122 kg)	1999-11-27	Kentucky
G	5	Fred VanVleet	6 ft 0 in (1.83 m)	213 lb (97 kg)	1994-02-25	Wichita State

Coaches
Head coach
- Ime Udoka
Assistant(s)
- Josh Bostic
- Will Dunn
- Chip Engelland
- Cam Hodges
- Royal Ivey
- Garrett Jackson
- Robbie Lemons
- Ben Sullivan

Legend
- (DP) Unsigned draft pick
- (FA) Free agent
- (S) Suspended
- (GL) On assignment to G League affiliate
- (TW) Two-way affiliate player
- Injured

Roster
Updated: November 19, 2026

== Standings ==
=== Division ===
Southwest Division	W	L	PCT	GB	Home	Road	Div	GP
San Antonio Spurs	13	3	.813	–	6‍–‍3	7‍–‍0	2–1	16
Memphis Grizzlies	12	4	.750	1.0	4‍–‍4	8‍–‍0	1–1	16
Houston Rockets	12	5	.706	1.5	7‍–‍1	5‍–‍4	2–1	17
Dallas Mavericks	8	7	.533	4.5	6‍–‍2	2‍–‍5	1–3	15
New Orleans Pelicans	5	12	.294	8.5	4‍–‍7	1‍–‍5	1–1	17

=== Conference ===
Western Conference
#	Team	W	L	PCT	GB	GP
1	Los Angeles Lakers *	14	3	.824	–	17
2	San Antonio Spurs *	13	3	.813	0.5	16
3	Memphis Grizzlies	12	4	.750	1.5	16
4	Houston Rockets	12	5	.706	2.0	17
5	Minnesota Timberwolves *	11	5	.688	2.5	16
6	Portland Trail Blazers	10	5	.667	3.0	15
7	Denver Nuggets	9	5	.643	3.5	14
8	Oklahoma City Thunder	10	6	.625	3.5	16
9	Phoenix Suns	8	7	.533	5.0	15
10	Dallas Mavericks	8	7	.533	5.0	15
11	Golden State Warriors	8	8	.500	5.5	16
12	New Orleans Pelicans	5	12	.294	9.0	17
13	Los Angeles Clippers	4	10	.286	8.5	14
14	Utah Jazz	3	14	.176	11.0	17
15	Sacramento Kings	1	14	.067	12.0	15

== Game log ==
=== Preseason ===
2026 preseason game log
Total: 1–1 (Home: 1–1; Road: 1–0)
Preseason: 2–1 (home: 1–1; road: 1–0)

Game	Date	Team	Score	High points	High rebounds	High assists	Location Attendance	Record
1	October 9	@ Dallas	W 135–117	Tari Eason (20)	Alperen Şengün (10)	Alperen Şengün (10)	(Macau) Venetian Arena; 11,564	1–0
2	October 11	Dallas	L 115–132	Marcus Smart (20)	Capela, Smith Jr. (9)	Amen Thompson (6)	(Macau) Venetian Arena; 11,711	1–1
3	October 15	Oklahoma City	W 116–89	Bogdan Bogdanović (15)	Alperen Şengün (7)	Fred VanVleet (8)	Toyota Center; 16,605	2–1

2026–27 preseason schedule

=== Regular season ===
2026–27 game log
Total: 12–5 (Home: 7–1; Road: 5–4)
October: 6–1 (home: 3–0; road: 3–1)

Game	Date	Team	Score	High points	High rebounds	High assists	Location Attendance	Record
1	October 21	Dallas	W 128–110	Durant, Smith Jr. (30)	Şengün, Thompson (10)	Fred VanVleet (11)	Toyota Center; 18,055	1–0
2	October 23	@ San Antonio	W 114–110	Alperen Şengün (29)	Amen Thompson (10)	Alperen Şengün (7)	Moody Center; 16,723	2–0
3	October 24	@ Atlanta	W 121–114	Kevin Durant (22)	Amen Thompson (11)	Şengün, Sheppard (7)	State Farm Arena; 17,962	3–0
4	October 26	Atlanta	W 120–110	Alperen Şengün (29)	Jabari Smith Jr. (12)	Alperen Şengün (9)	Toyota Center; 18,055	4–0
5	October 28	@ Milwaukee	W 132–100	Fred VanVleet (24)	Tari Eason (9)	Fred VanVleet (5)	Fiserv Forum; 12,232	5–0
6	October 30	@ Dallas	L 111–116	Kevin Durant (28)	Tari Eason (13)	Thompson, VanVleet (6)	American Airlines Center; 18,832	5–1
7	October 31	Oklahoma City	W 119–98	Jabari Smith Jr. (30)	Şengün, Smith Jr. (9)	Alperen Şengün (9)	Toyota Center; 18,055	6–1

November: 6–4 (home: 4–1; road: 2–3)

Game	Date	Team	Score	High points	High rebounds	High assists	Location Attendance	Record
8	November 2	Boston	W 109–93	Alperen Şengün (26)	Jabari Smith Jr. (10)	Alperen Şengün (10)	Toyota Center; 18,055	7–1
9	November 4	Minnesota	L 107–117	Kevin Durant (21)	Alperen Şengün (12)	Alperen Şengün (10)	Toyota Center; 18,055	7–2
10	November 7	@ Phoenix	L 99–102	Kevin Durant (21)	Kevin Durant (10)	Alperen Şengün (5)	Mortgage Matchup Center; 17,071	7–3
11	November 9	Denver	W 110–100	Kevin Durant (23)	Kevin Durant (12)	Durant, Şengün (8)	Toyota Center; 18,055	8–3
12	November 11	Golden State	W 115–108	Kevin Durant (20)	Alperen Şengün (13)	Alperen Şengün (9)	Toyota Center; 18,055	9–3
13	November 13	Utah	W 125–118	Alperen Şengün (43)	Alperen Şengün (12)	Kevin Durant (6)	Toyota Center; 18,055	10–3
14	November 15	@ Washington	W 147–119	Amen Thompson (26)	Oscar Tshiebwe (9)	Alperen Şengün (8)	Capital One Arena; 18,041	11–3
15	November 16	@ Miami	L 110–128	Alperen Şengün (23)	Crawford, Smith Jr. (10)	Fred VanVleet (6)	Kaseya Center; 19,662	11–4
16	November 18	@ Indiana	W 119–104	Kevin Durant (21)	Amen Thompson (9)	Fred VanVleet (6)	Gainbridge Fieldhouse; 17,274	12–4
17	November 20	@ Denver	L 124–133	Alperen Şengün (28)	Alperen Şengün (11)	Alperen Şengün (10)	Ball Arena; 19,566	12–5
18	November 23	L.A. Clippers					Toyota Center	–
19	November 25	Phoenix					Toyota Center	–
20	November 28	Philadelphia					Toyota Center	–
21	November 30	L.A. Lakers					Toyota Center	–

December: 0–0 (home: 0–0; road: 0–0)

Game	Date	Team	Score	High points	High rebounds	High assists	Location Attendance	Record
22	December 1	Toronto					Toyota Center	–
23	TBD	TBD					TBD	–
24	TBD	TBD					TBD	–
25	December 13	@ Chicago					United Center	–
26	December 14	New York					Toyota Center	–
27	December 16	Milwaukee					Toyota Center	–
28	December 18	@ Memphis					FedExForum	–
29	December 20	@ Toronto					Scotiabank Arena	–
30	December 23	@ Philadelphia					Xfinity Mobile Arena	–
31	December 27	Oklahoma City					Toyota Center	–
32	December 29	@ L.A. Lakers					Crypto.com Arena	–
33	December 30	@ Golden State					Chase Center	–

January: 0–0 (home: 0–0; road: 0–0)

Game	Date	Team	Score	High points	High rebounds	High assists	Location Attendance	Record
34	January 1	Dallas					Toyota Center	–
35	January 3	Cleveland					Toyota Center	–
36	January 5	Minnesota					Toyota Center	–
37	January 7	Memphis					Toyota Center	–
38	January 9	@ Brooklyn					Barclays Center	–
39	January 11	@ Boston					TD Garden	–
40	January 13	@ Oklahoma City					Paycom Center	–
41	January 15	Washington					Toyota Center	–
42	January 16	Detroit					Toyota Center	–
43	January 18	@ Memphis					FedExForum	–
44	January 20	@ Minnesota					Target Center	–
45	January 22	@ Charlotte					Spectrum Center	–
46	January 24	@ Orlando					Kia Center	–
47	January 26	@ San Antonio					Frost Bank Center	–
48	January 27	New Orleans					Toyota Center	–
49	January 29	Orlando					Toyota Center	–
50	January 31	@ Dallas					American Airlines Center	–

February: 0–0 (home: 0–0; road: 0–0)

Game	Date	Team	Score	High points	High rebounds	High assists	Location Attendance	Record
51	February 3	Utah					Toyota Center	–
52	February 5	@ Phoenix					Mortgage Matchup Center	–
53	February 7	@ Sacramento					Golden 1 Center	–
54	February 9	@ Utah					Delta Center	–
55	February 11	Sacramento					Toyota Center	–
56	February 12	@ New Orleans					Smoothie King Center	–
57	February 14	Denver					Toyota Center	–
58	February 16	@ L.A. Clippers					Intuit Dome	–
59	February 18	@ L.A. Lakers					Crypto.com Arena	–
All-Star Game
60	February 26	Charlotte					Toyota Center	–
61	February 28	Miami					Toyota Center	–

March: 0–0 (home: 0–0; road: 0–0)

Game	Date	Team	Score	High points	High rebounds	High assists	Location Attendance	Record
62	March 1	Golden State					Toyota Center	–
63	March 3	New Orleans					Toyota Center	–
64	March 5	San Antonio					Toyota Center	–
65	March 7	@ Golden State					Chase Center	–
66	March 8	@ L.A. Clippers					Intuit Dome	–
67	March 10	@ Utah					Delta Center	–
68	March 13	Indiana					Toyota Center	–
69	March 16	San Antonio					Toyota Center	–
70	March 17	Brooklyn					Toyota Center	–
71	March 19	@ New Orleans					Smoothie King Center	–
72	March 22	@ Cleveland					Rocket Arena	–
73	March 24	@ New York					Madison Square Garden	–
74	March 25	@ Detroit					Little Caesars Arena	–
75	March 28	L.A. Lakers					Toyota Center	–
76	March 30	@ Portland					Moda Center	–
77	March 31	@ Portland					Moda Center	–

April: 0–0 (home: 0–0; road: 0–0)

Game	Date	Team	Score	High points	High rebounds	High assists	Location Attendance	Record
78	April 2	Memphis					Toyota Center	–
79	April 4	Chicago					Toyota Center	–
80	April 7	Sacramento					Toyota Center	–
81	April 9	Portland					Toyota Center	–
82	April 11	@ Minnesota					Target Center	–

2026–27 season schedule

== NBA Cup ==
=== West Group A ===
Pos	Team	Pld	W	L	PF	PA	PD	Qualification
1	Dallas Mavericks	2	2	0	228	211	+17	Advance to knockout stage
2	Denver Nuggets	2	2	0	260	244	+16	Possible knockout stage based on ranking
3	Phoenix Suns	2	1	1	231	228	+3	
4	Houston Rockets	3	1	2	360	367	−7	
5	Utah Jazz	3	0	3	319	348	−29	

Updated to game(s) played on November 20, 2026. Source:

== Transactions ==
=== Trades ===
Date	Trade		Ref.
June 24, 2026	To Houston Rockets: Cash considerations	To Los Angeles Clippers: Draft rights to Nick Martinelli (No. 55)	
June 24, 2026	To Houston Rockets: Draft rights to Bruce Thornton (No. 31); Draft rights to Nick Martinelli (No. 55) (Note: Houston flipped his rights to the Los Angeles Clippers for cash considerations.)	To New York Knicks: Draft rights to Jack Kayil (No. 39); Draft rights to Ugonna Onyenso (No. 53); Draft rights to Mojave King (2023 No. 47); 2029 SAC second-round pick	
July 6, 2026	To Houston Rockets: Cash considerations	To Charlotte Hornets: Dorian Finney-Smith; 2027 MEM second-round pick; 2028 HOU second-round pick; 2033 HOU second-round pick	

=== Free agency ===
==== Re-signed ====
Date	Player	Ref.
July 9, 2026	Tari Eason	
July 22, 2026	Isaiah Crawford	

==== Additions ====
Date	Player	Former Team	Ref.
July 8, 2026	Bogdan Bogdanović	Los Angeles Clippers	
July 10, 2026	Marcus Smart	Los Angeles Lakers	

==== Subtractions ====
Player	Reason	New Team	Ref.
Josh Okogie	Free agency	Utah Jazz	
Aaron Holiday	Free agency	(Italy) Maxima Roma	
