= 2026–27 New Orleans Pelicans season =

- Head coach: Jamahl Mosley
- President: Dennis Lauscha
- General manager: Joe Dumars
- Owner: Gayle Benson
- Arena: Smoothie King Center

Results
- Record: 5–13 (.278)
- Place: Division: 5th (Southwest); Conference: 12th (Western)
- Stats at Basketball Reference

Local media
- Television: Gulf Coast Sports & Entertainment Network
- Radio: WWL (AM) and WWL-FM

The 2026–27 New Orleans Pelicans season is the 25th season for the franchise in the National Basketball Association (NBA). On May 18, 2026, the Pelicans hired Jamahl Mosley as their new head coach.

== Draft picks ==
Round	Pick	Player	Position	Nationality	College
2	58	Jaron Pierre Jr.	SG	United States	SMU

The Pelicans entered the draft holding one second-round selection, which was originally owned by the Detroit Pistons and acquired from a February 2026 trade with the New York Knicks. The pick was conveyed as the least favorable selection because Detroit finished with a better record in the 2025–26 regular season than the Orlando Magic (the pick's second trade destination) and the Milwaukee Bucks. The Pelicans had traded their first-round selection, which became the more favorable pick over Milwaukee's following the NBA draft lottery, to the Atlanta Hawks for the draft rights to Derik Queen in 2025, while their original second-round selection was traded to the Portland Trail Blazers and subsequently used in the draft by the Chicago Bulls as the most favorable selection following the Pelicans' lower regular season finish than three other teams.

== Roster ==
New Orleans Pelicans roster
Players

Pos.	No.	Player	Height	Weight	DOB	From
G/F	41	Saddiq Bey	6 ft 8 in (2.03 m)	240 lb (109 kg)	1999-04-09	Villanova
F	8	Malik Dia (TW)	6 ft 9 in (2.06 m)	256 lb (116 kg)	2004-02-04	Mississippi
G	0	Jeremiah Fears	6 ft 3 in (1.91 m)	188 lb (85 kg)	2006-10-14	Oklahoma
G	14	AJ Johnson	6 ft 6 in (1.98 m)	175 lb (79 kg)	2004-12-01
F	2	Herbert Jones	6 ft 7 in (2.01 m)	210 lb (95 kg)	1998-10-06	Alabama
C	6	DeAndre Jordan	6 ft 11 in (2.11 m)	280 lb (127 kg)	1988-07-21	Texas A&M
G/F	24	Bennedict Mathurin	6 ft 5 in (1.96 m)	222 lb (101 kg)	2002-06-19	Arizona
F/C	17	Karlo Matković	6 ft 11 in (2.11 m)	255 lb (116 kg)	2001-03-30	Croatia
G	11	Bryce McGowens	6 ft 6 in (1.98 m)	202 lb (92 kg)	2002-11-08	Nebraska
C	21	Yves Missi (injured)	6 ft 11 in (2.11 m)	236 lb (107 kg)	2004-05-14	Baylor
F	25	Trey Murphy III	6 ft 9 in (2.06 m)	220 lb (100 kg)	2000-06-18	Virginia
G	5	Dejounte Murray	6 ft 4 in (1.93 m)	188 lb (85 kg)	1996-09-19	Washington
G	10	Jaron Pierre Jr. (TW)	6 ft 6 in (1.98 m)	206 lb (93 kg)	2002-07-12	SMU
G	3	Jordan Poole	6 ft 4 in (1.93 m)	200 lb (91 kg)	1999-06-19	Michigan
C	22	Derik Queen	6 ft 11 in (2.11 m)	225 lb (102 kg)	2004-11-27	Maryland
F	13	Julian Reese (TW)	6 ft 11 in (2.11 m)	230 lb (104 kg)	2003-06-30	Maryland
G/F	9	Trendon Watford	6 ft 9 in (2.06 m)	244 lb (111 kg)	2000-09-09	LSU
F	1	Zion Williamson	6 ft 6 in (1.98 m)	277 lb (126 kg)	2000-07-06	Duke

Coaches
Head coach
- Jamahl Mosley
Assistant(s)
- Bret Brielmaier
- Randy Gregory
- Jodie Meeks
- Dale Osbourne
- God Shammgod

Legend
- (DP) Unsigned draft pick
- (FA) Free agent
- (S) Suspended
- (GL) On assignment to G League
- (TW) Two-way affiliate player
- Injured

Roster
Updated: October 17, 2026

== Standings ==
=== Division ===
Southwest Division	W	L	PCT	GB	Home	Road	Div	GP
San Antonio Spurs	13	3	.813	–	6‍–‍3	7‍–‍0	2–1	16
Memphis Grizzlies	12	4	.750	1.0	4‍–‍4	8‍–‍0	1–1	16
Houston Rockets	12	5	.706	1.5	7‍–‍1	5‍–‍4	2–1	17
Dallas Mavericks	8	7	.533	4.5	6‍–‍2	2‍–‍5	1–3	15
New Orleans Pelicans	5	12	.294	8.5	4‍–‍7	1‍–‍5	1–1	17

=== Conference ===
Western Conference
#	Team	W	L	PCT	GB	GP
1	Los Angeles Lakers *	14	3	.824	–	17
2	San Antonio Spurs *	13	3	.813	0.5	16
3	Memphis Grizzlies	12	4	.750	1.5	16
4	Houston Rockets	12	5	.706	2.0	17
5	Minnesota Timberwolves *	11	5	.688	2.5	16
6	Portland Trail Blazers	10	5	.667	3.0	15
7	Denver Nuggets	9	5	.643	3.5	14
8	Oklahoma City Thunder	10	6	.625	3.5	16
9	Phoenix Suns	8	7	.533	5.0	15
10	Dallas Mavericks	8	7	.533	5.0	15
11	Golden State Warriors	8	8	.500	5.5	16
12	New Orleans Pelicans	5	12	.294	9.0	17
13	Los Angeles Clippers	4	10	.286	8.5	14
14	Utah Jazz	3	14	.176	11.0	17
15	Sacramento Kings	1	14	.067	12.0	15

== Game log ==
=== Preseason ===
2026 preseason game log
Total: 3–1 (Home: 1–0; Road: 2–1)
Preseason: 3–1 (home: 1–0; road: 2–1)

Game	Date	Team	Score	High points	High rebounds	High assists	Location Attendance	Record
1	October 6	@ Oklahoma City	W 116–110	Bennedict Mathurin (13)	Derik Queen (9)	Dejounte Murray (6)	BOK Center	1–0
2	October 8	@ Miami	L 118–128	Jordan Poole (14)	Yves Missi (9)	Bryce McGowens (7)	Kaseya Center; 19,600	1–1
3	October 14	@ Dallas	W 101–97	Jeremiah Fears (16)	Derik Queen (11)	Jeremiah Fears (5)	American Airlines Center; 17,140	2–1
4	October 16	Washington	W 107–106	Saddiq Bey (19)	Missi, Queen (7)	Fears, Queen (5)	Smoothie King Center	3–1

2026–27 preseason schedule

=== Regular season ===
2026–27 game log
Total: 5–13 (Home: 4–7; Road: 1–6)
October: 2–4 (home: 2–2; road: 0–2)

Game	Date	Team	Score	High points	High rebounds	High assists	Location Attendance	Record
1	October 21	Indiana	L 120–123	Dejounte Murray (23)	Yves Missi (14)	Dejounte Murray (7)	Smoothie King Center; 17,232	0–1
2	October 23	@ Utah	L 119–120	Zion Williamson (23)	Derik Queen (7)	Dejounte Murray (6)	Delta Center; 17,867	0–2
3	October 24	@ Denver	L 135–141 (OT)	Trey Murphy III (26)	DeAndre Jordan (9)	Jordan Poole (7)	Ball Arena; 19,905	0–3
4	October 28	Denver	L 91–104	Zion Williamson (25)	Derik Queen (12)	Dejounte Murray (5)	Smoothie King Center; 16,334	0–4
5	October 29	Sacramento	W 132–120	Fears, Williamson (22)	Jeremiah Fears (8)	Jeremiah Fears (13)	Smoothie King Center; 15,442	1–4
6	October 31	Atlanta	W 121–99	Saddiq Bey (26)	Karlo Matković (10)	Jeremiah Fears (7)	Smoothie King Center	2–4

November: 3–9 (home: 2–5; road: 1–4)

Game	Date	Team	Score	High points	High rebounds	High assists	Location Attendance	Record
7	November 2	@ Memphis	W 135–134 (OT)	Matković, Williamson (25)	Zion Williamson (11)	Jeremiah Fears (7)	FedExForum; 13,322	3–4
8	November 4	Utah	W 120–113 (OT)	Zion Williamson (23)	Derik Queen (9)	Derik Queen (6)	Smoothie King Center; 16,875	4–4
9	November 6	Minnesota	L 109–115	Jeremiah Fears (24)	Zion Williamson (8)	Fears, Murphy III (5)	Smoothie King Center; 17,767	4–5
10	November 8	@ L.A. Clippers	L 123–139	Trey Murphy III (26)	Trey Murphy III (7)	Jeremiah Fears (5)	Intuit Dome; 17,927	4–6
11	November 9	@ Golden State	L 87–138	Derik Queen (16)	Jones, Matković (6)	Jeremiah Fears (8)	Chase Center; 18,064	4–7
12	November 11	Brooklyn	L 111–145	Zion Williamson (29)	Tied (4)	Jeremiah Fears (5)	Smoothie King Center; 15,043	4–8
13	November 13	Memphis	L 111–142	Saddiq Bey (30)	Saddiq Beey (10)	Jeremiah Fears (7)	Smoothie King Center; 16,487	4–9
14	November 14	Denver	L 108–116	Zion Williamson (24)	Yves Missi (8)	Jeremiah Fears (7)	Smoothie King Center; 15,721	4–10
15	November 16	Golden State	W 115–94	Saddiq Bey (23)	Yves Missi (14)	Jeremiah Fears (10)	Smoothie King Center; 16,624	5–10
16	November 18	Detroit	L 109–122	Zion Williamson (24)	Saddiq Bey (8)	Saddiq Bey (6)	Smoothie King Center; 16,779	5–11
17	November 20	@ Oklahoma City	L 120–126	Fears, Williamson (22)	Yves Missi (8)	Zion Williamson (7)	Paycom Center; 18,203	5–12
18	November 21	@ San Antonio	L 91–114	Jeremiah Fears (29)	Derik Queen (15)	Jeremiah Fears (4)	Frost Bank Center; 18,708	5–13
19	November 23	Phoenix					Smoothie King Center	–
20	November 27	@ L.A. Clippers					Intuit Dome	–
21	November 29	@ Portland					Moda Center	–
22	November 30	@ Sacramento					Golden 1 Center	–

December: 0–0 (home: 0–0; road: 0–0)

Game	Date	Team	Score	High points	High rebounds	High assists	Location Attendance	Record
23	December 2	L.A. Lakers					Smoothie King Center	–
24	TBD	TBD					TBD	–
25	TBD	TBD					TBD	–
26	December 13	@ Sacramento					Golden 1 Center	–
27	December 14	@ L.A. Lakers					Crypto.com Arena	–
28	December 16	New York					Smoothie King Center	–
29	December 18	Sacramento					Smoothie King Center	–
30	December 20	San Antonio					Smoothie King Center	–
31	December 21	Memphis					Smoothie King Center	–
32	December 23	Oklahoma City					Smoothie King Center	–
33	December 26	@ Brooklyn					Barclays Center	–
34	December 28	@ Toronto					Scotiabank Arena	–
35	December 30	@ Detroit					Little Caesars Arena	–
36	December 31	L.A. Lakers					Smoothie King Center	–

January: 0–0 (home: 0–0; road: 0–0)

Game	Date	Team	Score	High points	High rebounds	High assists	Location Attendance	Record
37	January 2	Miami					Smoothie King Center	–
38	January 4	Dallas					Smoothie King Center	–
39	January 6	Portland					Smoothie King Center	–
40	January 8	Orlando					Smoothie King Center	–
41	January 10	@ Miami					Kaseya Center	–
42	January 14	@ San Antonio					(France) Accor Arena	–
43	January 17	San Antonio					(United Kingdom) Co-op Live	–
44	January 20	Oklahoma City					Smoothie King Center	–
45	January 22	Dallas					Smoothie King Center	–
46	January 25	Cleveland					Smoothie King Center	–
47	January 27	@ Houston					Toyota Center	–
48	January 28	Philadelphia					Smoothie King Center	–
49	January 30	@ Cleveland					Rocket Arena	–

February: 0–0 (home: 0–0; road: 0–0)

Game	Date	Team	Score	High points	High rebounds	High assists	Location Attendance	Record
50	February 1	@ Philadelphia					Xfinity Mobile Arena	–
51	February 2	@ Orlando					Kia Center	–
52	February 4	@ Washington					Capital One Arena	–
53	February 6	@ Chicago					United Center	–
54	February 8	@ Indiana					Gainbridge Fieldhouse	–
55	February 10	@ Atlanta					State Farm Arena	–
56	February 12	Houston					Smoothie King Center	–
57	February 14	L.A. Clippers					Smoothie King Center	–
58	February 16	@ Portland					Moda Center	–
59	February 17	@ Golden State					Chase Center	–
All-Star Game
60	February 25	Phoenix					Smoothie King Center	–
61	February 27	@ Phoenix					Mortgage Matchup Center	–

March: 0–0 (home: 0–0; road: 0–0)

Game	Date	Team	Score	High points	High rebounds	High assists	Location Attendance	Record
62	March 1	Utah					Smoothie King Center	–
63	March 3	@ Houston					Toyota Center	–
64	March 5	Milwaukee					Smoothie King Center	–
65	March 6	@ Memphis					FedExForum	–
66	March 8	@ Minnesota					Target Center	–
67	March 10	@ Charlotte					Spectrum Center	–
68	March 12	Toronto					Smoothie King Center	–
69	March 13	@ Dallas					American Airlines Center	–
70	March 16	Minnesota					Smoothie King Center	–
71	March 18	Charlotte					Smoothie King Center	–
72	March 19	Houston					Smoothie King Center	–
73	March 21	@ Boston					TD Garden	–
74	March 23	@ New York					Madison Square Garden	–
75	March 26	@ Dallas					American Airlines Center	–
76	March 28	Boston					Smoothie King Center	–
77	March 31	@ Milwaukee					Fiserv Forum	–

April: 0–0 (home: 0–0; road: 0–0)

Game	Date	Team	Score	High points	High rebounds	High assists	Location Attendance	Record
78	April 3	@ Oklahoma City					Paycom Center	–
79	April 5	Washington					Smoothie King Center	–
80	April 6	@ Denver					Ball Arena	–
81	April 8	@ Utah					Delta Center	–
82	April 11	Chicago					Smoothie King Center	–

2026–27 season schedule

== NBA Cup ==
=== West Group B ===
Pos	Team	Pld	W	L	PF	PA	PD	Qualification
1	Minnesota Timberwolves	2	2	0	242	210	+32	Advance to knockout stage
2	Oklahoma City Thunder	3	2	1	366	330	+36	Possible knockout stage based on ranking
3	Memphis Grizzlies	2	1	1	239	239	0	
4	Los Angeles Clippers	2	1	1	214	239	−25	
5	New Orleans Pelicans	3	0	3	340	383	−43	

Updated to game(s) played on November 20, 2026. Source:

== Transactions ==
=== Trades ===
Date	Trade	Ref.

=== Free agency ===
==== Re-signed ====
Date	Player	Ref.
July 7, 2026	Hunter Dickinson (two-way contract)	
July 11, 2026	DeAndre Jordan	

==== Additions ====
Date	Player	Former Team	Ref.

==== Subtractions ====
Player	Reason	New Team	Ref.
Kevon Looney	Free agency	Los Angeles Lakers	
Trey Alexander	Free agency	Utah Jazz	
Josh Oduro	Signed overseas	Melbourne United (Australia)	
