= 2026–27 San Antonio Spurs season =

- Head coach: Mitch Johnson
- President: Gregg Popovich
- General manager: Brian Wright
- Owner: Peter Holt
- Arena: Frost Bank Center

Results
- Record: 14–3 (.824)
- Place: Division: 1st (Southwest); Conference: 1st (Western)
- Stats at Basketball Reference

Local media
- Television: DAZN
- Radio: 1200 WOAI

The 2026–27 San Antonio Spurs season is the 60th season of the franchise, its 51st in the National Basketball Association (NBA), and its 54th in the San Antonio area. The team enters the season as the defending Southwest Division and Western Conference champions.

Early in the regular season, the Spurs won 12 straight games, their longest winning streak since 2015–16.

== Draft picks ==
Round	Pick	Player	Position	Nationality	College
1	20	Jayden Quaintance	PF/C	United States	Kentucky
2	35	Trevon Brazile	PF	United States	Arkansas
2	42	Ja'Kobi Gillespie	PG	United States	Tennessee
2	44	Maliq Brown	PF	United States	Duke

The Spurs entered the draft holding one first-round selection and three second-round selections, all acquired through prior trades. The team swapped their original first-round pick with the Atlanta Hawks in the 2022 Dejounte Murray trade and their original second-round pick with the Indiana Pacers, who later traded it to the Minnesota Timberwolves as the least favorable pick owing to the Spurs' better finish in the 2025–26 season than both Indiana and the Miami Heat.

== Roster ==
San Antonio Spurs roster
Players

Pos.	No.	Player	Height	Weight	DOB	From
F	40	Harrison Barnes	6 ft 7 in (2.01 m)	225 lb (102 kg)	1992-05-30	North Carolina
F	15	Maliq Brown (TW)	6 ft 8 in (2.03 m)	225 lb (102 kg)	2003-11-16	Duke
F	11	Carter Bryant	6 ft 6 in (1.98 m)	220 lb (100 kg)	2005-11-26	Arizona
G	5	Stephon Castle	6 ft 6 in (1.98 m)	215 lb (98 kg)	2004-11-01	Connecticut
F	30	Julian Champagnie	6 ft 7 in (2.01 m)	217 lb (98 kg)	2001-06-29	St. John's
G	4	De'Aaron Fox	6 ft 3 in (1.91 m)	185 lb (84 kg)	1997-12-20	Kentucky
G	17	Ja'Kobi Gillespie (TW)	6 ft 0 in (1.83 m)	186 lb (84 kg)	2004-03-10	Tennessee
G	2	Dylan Harper	6 ft 5 in (1.96 m)	215 lb (98 kg)	2006-03-02	Rutgers
F	23	Tobias Harris (injured)	6 ft 8 in (2.03 m)	226 lb (103 kg)	1992-07-15	Tennessee
G/F	3	Keldon Johnson	6 ft 5 in (1.96 m)	220 lb (100 kg)	1999-10-11	Kentucky
G	25	David Jones García (TW)	6 ft 4 in (1.93 m)	210 lb (95 kg)	2001-11-24	Memphis
F/C	7	Luke Kornet	7 ft 1 in (2.16 m)	250 lb (113 kg)	1995-07-15	Vanderbilt
G	0	Jordan McLaughlin	5 ft 11 in (1.80 m)	185 lb (84 kg)	1996-04-09	USC
F	22	Jayden Quaintance (injured)	6 ft 9 in (2.06 m)	255 lb (116 kg)	2007-07-11	Kentucky
C	10	Tarris Reed Jr.	6 ft 10 in (2.08 m)	265 lb (120 kg)	2003-08-05	Connecticut
G/F	24	Devin Vassell	6 ft 5 in (1.96 m)	200 lb (91 kg)	2000-08-23	Florida State
F/C	1	Victor Wembanyama	7 ft 4 in (2.24 m)	235 lb (107 kg)	2004-01-04	France

Coaches
Head coach
- Mitch Johnson
Assistant(s)
- Jimmy Baron
- Josh Brannon
- Brett Brown
- Billy Donovan
- Scott King
- Tim Martin
- Matthew Nielsen
- Mike Noyes
- L. D. Williams
- Corliss Williamson

Legend
- (DP) Unsigned draft pick
- (FA) Free agent
- (S) Suspended
- (GL) On assignment to G League affiliate
- (TW) Two-way affiliate player
- Injured

Roster
Updated: October 15, 2026

== Standings ==
=== Division ===
Southwest Division	W	L	PCT	GB	Home	Road	Div	GP
San Antonio Spurs	13	3	.813	–	6‍–‍3	7‍–‍0	2–1	16
Memphis Grizzlies	12	4	.750	1.0	4‍–‍4	8‍–‍0	1–1	16
Houston Rockets	12	5	.706	1.5	7‍–‍1	5‍–‍4	2–1	17
Dallas Mavericks	8	7	.533	4.5	6‍–‍2	2‍–‍5	1–3	15
New Orleans Pelicans	5	12	.294	8.5	4‍–‍7	1‍–‍5	1–1	17

=== Conference ===
Western Conference
#	Team	W	L	PCT	GB	GP
1	Los Angeles Lakers *	14	3	.824	–	17
2	San Antonio Spurs *	13	3	.813	0.5	16
3	Memphis Grizzlies	12	4	.750	1.5	16
4	Houston Rockets	12	5	.706	2.0	17
5	Minnesota Timberwolves *	11	5	.688	2.5	16
6	Portland Trail Blazers	10	5	.667	3.0	15
7	Denver Nuggets	9	5	.643	3.5	14
8	Oklahoma City Thunder	10	6	.625	3.5	16
9	Phoenix Suns	8	7	.533	5.0	15
10	Dallas Mavericks	8	7	.533	5.0	15
11	Golden State Warriors	8	8	.500	5.5	16
12	New Orleans Pelicans	5	12	.294	9.0	17
13	Los Angeles Clippers	4	10	.286	8.5	14
14	Utah Jazz	3	14	.176	11.0	17
15	Sacramento Kings	1	14	.067	12.0	15

== Game log ==
=== Preseason ===
2026 preseason game log
Total: 2–3 (Home: 2–1; Road: 0–2)
Preseason: 2–3 (home: 2–1; road: 0–2)

Game	Date	Team	Score	High points	High rebounds	High assists	Location Attendance	Record
1	October 8	Atlanta	L 116–123	Dylan Harper (16)	Keldon Johnson (7)	Dylan Harper (4)	Frost Bank Center; 18,354	0–1
2	October 10	@ Phoenix	L 98–102	Dylan Harper (15)	Luke Kornet (10)	Victor Wembanyama (6)	Mortgage Matchup Center; 17,071	0–2
3	October 12	@ Utah	L 109–119	Ja'Kobi Gillespie (25)	Tarris Reed Jr. (17)	Jordan McLaughlin (6)	Delta Center; 15,495	0–3
4	October 14	Phoenix	W 123–103	Victor Wembanyama (19)	Tarris Reed Jr. (9)	Tied (4)	Frost Bank Center; 18,354	1–3
5	October 16	Sacramento	W 126–97	Dylan Harper (19)	Tied (8)	Stephon Castle (5)	Frost Bank Center; 18,354	2–3

2026–27 preseason schedule

=== Regular season ===
2026–27 game log
Total: 14–3 (Home: 7–3; Road: 7–0)
October: 4–2 (home: 2–2; road: 2–0)

Game	Date	Team	Score	High points	High rebounds	High assists	Location Attendance	Record
1	October 20	Oklahoma City	L 104–116	Stephon Castle (24)	Victor Wembanyama (13)	De'Aaron Fox (7)	Frost Bank Center; 19,160	0–1
2	October 23	Houston	L 110–114	Victor Wembanyama (25)	Victor Wembanyama (13)	De'Aaron Fox (9)	Moody Center; 16,723	0–2
3	October 24	@ Dallas	W 122–106	Victor Wembanyama (23)	Victor Wembanyama (7)	De'Aaron Fox (9)	American Airlines Center; 19,555	1–2
4	October 27	Sacramento	W 130–103	Victor Wembanyama (29)	Victor Wembanyama (10)	Devin Vassell (8)	Frost Bank Center; 18,354	2–2
5	October 28	@ Utah	W 117–111 (OT)	Victor Wembanyama (36)	Victor Wembanyama (14)	Castle, Harper (8)	Delta Center; 17,867	3–2
6	October 31	Minnesota	W 121–111	Victor Wembanyama (43)	De'Aaron Fox (8)	De'Aaron Fox (7)	Frost Bank Center; 18,354	4–2

November: 10–1 (home: 5–1; road: 5–0)

Game	Date	Team	Score	High points	High rebounds	High assists	Location Attendance	Record
7	November 2	Utah	W 119–97	Dylan Harper (17)	Victor Wembanyama (11)	Dylan Harper (8)	Frost Bank Center; 18,464	5–2
8	November 4	Dallas	W 112–111	Victor Wembanyama (52)	Victor Wembanyama (24)	Fox, Vassell (4)	Frost Bank Center; 18,354	6–2
9	November 6	@ Sacramento	W 124–109	Victor Wembanyama (30)	Victor Wembanyama (14)	Stephon Castle (7)	Golden 1 Center; 14,238	7–2
10	November 7	@ Portland	W 125–103	Victor Wembanyama (29)	Tied (7)	De'Aaron Fox (6)	Moda Center; 19,916	8–2
11	November 9	@ Phoenix	W 122–96	Victor Wembanyama (40)	Victor Wembanyama (11)	Stephon Castle (7)	Mortgage Matchup Center; 17,071	9–2
12	November 11	@ Chicago	W 124–119	Victor Wembanyama (32)	Victor Wembanyama (9)	Dylan Harper (10)	United Center; 19,699	10–2
13	November 13	Golden State	W 123–85	Stephon Castle (32)	Victor Wembanyama (12)	Castle, Wembanyama (6)	Frost Bank Center; 18,849	11–2
14	November 15	@ Utah	W 110–102	Dylan Harper (31)	Johnson, Wembanyama (10)	Stephon Castle (9)	Delta Center; 17,867	12–2
15	November 17	Detroit	L 93–105	Victor Wembanyama (25)	Victor Wembanyama (18)	Stephon Castle (7)	Frost Bank Center; 18,412	12–3
16	November 19	L.A. Clippers	W 124–112	Victor Wembanyama (32)	Victor Wembanyama (11)	Stephon Castle (12)	Frost Bank Center; 18,532	13–3
17	November 21	New Orleans	W 114–91	Victor Wembanyama (50)	Victor Wembanyama (18)	De'Aaron Fox (10)	Frost Bank Center; 18,708	14–3
18	November 23	@ Sacramento					Golden 1 Center	–
19	November 25	@ Portland					Moda Center	–
20	November 27	L.A. Lakers					Frost Bank Center	–
21	November 29	Boston					Frost Bank Center	–
22	November 30	@ Milwaukee					Fiserv Forum	–

December: 0–0 (home: 0–0; road: 0–0)

Game	Date	Team	Score	High points	High rebounds	High assists	Location Attendance	Record
23	December 3	Toronto					Frost Bank Center	–
24	TBD	TBD					TBD	–
25	TBD	TBD					TBD	–
26	December 13	L.A. Clippers					Frost Bank Center	–
27	December 15	@ Cleveland					Rocket Arena	–
28	December 16	@ Toronto					Scotiabank Arena	–
29	December 18	Chicago					Frost Bank Center	–
30	December 20	@ New Orleans					Smoothie King Center	–
31	December 21	Milwaukee					Frost Bank Center	–
32	December 23	@ Brooklyn					Barclays Center	–
33	December 25	@ New York					Madison Square Garden	–
34	December 27	Atlanta					Frost Bank Center	–
35	December 29	@ Memphis					FedExForum	–
36	December 31	@ Charlotte					Spectrum Center	–

January: 0–0 (home: 0–0; road: 0–0)

Game	Date	Team	Score	High points	High rebounds	High assists	Location Attendance	Record
37	January 1	@ Washington					Capital One Arena	–
38	January 3	@ Minnesota					Target Center	–
39	January 6	Indiana					Frost Bank Center	–
40	January 8	Memphis					Frost Bank Center	–
41	January 10	@ Atlanta					State Farm Arena	–
42	January 14	New Orleans					(France) Accor Arena	–
43	January 17	@ New Orleans					(United Kingdom) Co-op Live	–
44	January 20	Miami					Frost Bank Center	–
45	January 22	Minnesota					Frost Bank Center	–
46	January 24	Portland					Frost Bank Center	–
47	January 26	Houston					Frost Bank Center	–
48	January 27	Charlotte					Frost Bank Center	–
49	January 30	@ Golden State					Chase Center	–

February: 0–0 (home: 0–0; road: 0–0)

Game	Date	Team	Score	High points	High rebounds	High assists	Location Attendance	Record
50	February 1	@ Golden State					Chase Center	–
51	February 2	@ L.A. Clippers					Intuit Dome	–
52	February 4	Orlando					Frost Bank Center	–
53	February 6	L.A. Lakers					Frost Bank Center	–
54	February 9	@ Dallas					American Airlines Center	–
55	February 11	@ Oklahoma City					Paycom Center	–
56	February 13	@ Orlando					Kia Center	–
57	February 15	@ Miami					Kaseya Center	–
58	February 17	@ Memphis					FedExForum	–
59	February 18	@ Minnesota					Target Center	–
All-Star Game
60	February 26	Memphis					Moody Center	–
61	February 28	Denver					Moody Center	–

March: 0–0 (home: 0–0; road: 0–0)

Game	Date	Team	Score	High points	High rebounds	High assists	Location Attendance	Record
62	March 3	@ Denver					Ball Arena	–
63	March 5	@ Houston					Toyota Center	–
64	March 7	New York					Frost Bank Center	–
65	March 9	Washington					Frost Bank Center	–
66	March 11	Philadelphia					Frost Bank Center	–
67	March 14	@ Oklahoma City					Paycom Center	–
68	March 16	@ Houston					Toyota Center	–
69	March 18	Brooklyn					Frost Bank Center	–
70	March 19	Dallas					Frost Bank Center	–
71	March 21	@ Philadelphia					Xfinity Mobile Arena	–
72	March 24	@ Boston					TD Garden	–
73	March 25	@ Indiana					Gainbridge Fieldhouse	–
74	March 27	@ Detroit					Little Caesars Arena	–
75	March 29	Phoenix					Frost Bank Center	–
76	March 31	Phoenix					Frost Bank Center	–

April: 0–0 (home: 0–0; road: 0–0)

Game	Date	Team	Score	High points	High rebounds	High assists	Location Attendance	Record
77	April 2	@ L.A. Clippers					Intuit Dome	–
78	April 4	@ L.A. Lakers					Crypto.com Arena	–
79	April 6	Sacramento					Frost Bank Center	–
80	April 7	Cleveland					Frost Bank Center	–
81	April 9	Denver					Frost Bank Center	–
82	April 11	Portland					Frost Bank Center	–

2026–27 season schedule

== NBA Cup ==
=== West Group C ===
Pos	Team	Pld	W	L	PF	PA	PD	Qualification
1	San Antonio Spurs	2	2	0	247	194	+53	Advance to knockout stage
2	Los Angeles Lakers	3	2	1	325	334	−9	Possible knockout stage based on ranking
3	Portland Trail Blazers	2	1	1	238	231	+7	
4	Golden State Warriors	2	1	1	197	218	−21	
5	Sacramento Kings	3	0	3	320	350	−30	

Updated to game(s) played on November 20, 2026. Source:

== Transactions ==
=== Trades ===
Date	Trade		Ref.
June 23, 2026	To San Antonio Spurs: Draft rights to Tarris Reed (No. 26)	To Denver Nuggets: 2026 Utah Jazz second-round pick (No. 35); 2028 Minnesota Timberwolves second-round pick; 2031 Sacramento Kings second-round pick	

=== Free agency ===
==== Re-signed ====
Date	Player	Ref.
July 8, 2026	Harrison Barnes	
July 13, 2026	Jordan McLaughlin	

==== Additions ====
Date	Player	Former Team	Ref.
July 6, 2026	Tobias Harris	Detroit Pistons	

==== Subtractions ====
Player	Reason	New Team	Ref.
Harrison Ingram	Free agency	Utah Jazz	
Emanuel Miller	Waived	Grand Rapids Gold (NBA G League)	
