= Sean Sweeney (basketball) =

American basketball coach (born 1984)

Orlando Magic
- Title: Head coach
- League: NBA

Personal information
- Born: June 3, 1984 (age 42) Saint Paul, Minnesota, U.S.
- Listed height: 5 ft 11 in (1.80 m)

Career information
- High school: Cretin-Derham Hall (Saint Paul, Minnesota)
- College: Green Bay (2001–2002); St. Thomas (Minnesota) (2002–2006)
- NBA draft: 2006: undrafted
- Position: Point guard
- Coaching career: 2011–present

Career history

Coaching
- 2011–2013: New Jersey / Brooklyn Nets (video coordinator)
- 2013–2014: Brooklyn Nets (assistant)
- 2014–2018: Milwaukee Bucks (assistant)
- 2018–2021: Detroit Pistons (assistant)
- 2021–2025: Dallas Mavericks (assistant)
- 2025–2026: San Antonio Spurs (associate HC)
- 2026–present: Orlando Magic

Career highlights
- As player: 2× All-MIAC (2005, 2006)

Sean Joseph Sweeney (born June 3, 1984) is an American professional basketball coach who is the head coach for the Orlando Magic of the National Basketball Association (NBA). He recently served as the associate head coach of the San Antonio Spurs of the NBA.

== Playing career ==
Sweeney played for University of Wisconsin–Green Bay for one season before transferring and graduating from University of St. Thomas at Saint Paul.

== Coaching career ==
=== Assistant coach (2011–2026) ===
Sweeney began his NBA coaching career as a video coordinator with the New Jersey Nets (later Brooklyn Nets) from 2011 to 2013 under head coaches Avery Johnson and PJ Carlesimo. He was later the assistant coach for the Nets from 2013 to 2014 and the Milwaukee Bucks from 2014 to 2018.

From 2018 to 2021, Sweeney was an assistant coach with the Detroit Pistons under head coach Dwane Casey.

In 2021, Sweeney joined the Dallas Mavericks as an assistant coach under head coach Jason Kidd, reuniting the two after they had previously worked together with the Nets and Bucks. With the Mavericks from 2021 to 2025, Sweeney was part of the 2022 Mavs team that went to the 2022 Western Conference Finals during the 2022 NBA playoffs and the 2024 Mavs team that went to the 2024 NBA Finals, losing 4–1 to the Boston Celtics.

On June 22, 2025, it was reported Sweeney would leave the Mavericks to join the San Antonio Spurs under new head coach Mitch Johnson. Sweeney was part of the 2026 Spurs team that improved by 28 games over the previous season and went to the 2026 NBA Finals, losing 4–1 to the New York Knicks.

=== Orlando Magic (2026–present) ===
On June 1, 2026, Sweeney was hired as the head coach of the Orlando Magic. He joined the team following the conclusion of the 2026 NBA Finals later that month.
