= Tony Black =

Tony or Anthony Black may refer to:

- Anthony S. Black (born 1951), American jockey
- Tony Black (record producer), American record producer
- Tony Black (footballer) (born 1969), English footballer
- Tony Black (writer), Scottish crime novelist
- Anthony Black (basketball) (born 2004), American basketball player
