= Braden Smith =

Braden, Braedon, or Braydon Smith may refer to:

- Braden Smith (American football) (born 1996), American football player
- Braden Smith (basketball) (born 2003), American basketball player
- Braeden Smith (born 2004), American college basketball player
- Braydon Smith (born 1991), Australian boxer
