= 2026–27 Toronto Raptors season =

- Head coach: Darko Rajaković
- General manager: Bobby Webster
- Owners: Maple Leaf Sports & Entertainment
- Arena: Scotiabank Arena

Results
- Record: 6–10 (.375)
- Place: Division: 4th (Atlantic); Conference: 9th (Eastern)
- Stats at Basketball Reference

Local media
- Television: TSN; Sportsnet

The 2026–27 Toronto Raptors season is the 32nd season for the franchise in the National Basketball Association (NBA).

The Raptors agreed to a deal with the Los Angeles Clippers to reacquire Kawhi Leonard on June 30, 2026. However, due to the ongoing investigation by the NBA of salary cap violations by the Clippers in regards to Leonard's contract, the trade was not finalized until September 14. Leonard previously played for the Raptors when they won the 2019 NBA Finals in his only season with the team up until this point in time.

== Draft picks ==
Round	Pick	Player	Position	Nationality	College
1	19	Allen Graves	PF	United States	Santa Clara
2	50	Jaden Bradley	PG	United States	Arizona

The Raptors entered the draft holding one first-round pick and one second-round pick, both their original selections. By the end of the draft, they were the only team to retain their original second-round selection, as all other picks in that round were traded.

== Roster ==
Toronto Raptors roster
Players

Pos.	No.	Player	Height	Weight	DOB	From
G/F	13	Kyle Anderson	6 ft 8 in (2.03 m)	230 lb (104 kg)	1993-09-20	UCLA
G/F	4	Scottie Barnes	6 ft 8 in (2.03 m)	237 lb (108 kg)	2001-08-01	Florida State
G/F	9	RJ Barrett	6 ft 6 in (1.98 m)	214 lb (97 kg)	2000-06-14	Duke
F	77	Jamison Battle	6 ft 7 in (2.01 m)	220 lb (100 kg)	2001-05-10	Ohio State
C	12	Nate Bittle (TW)	7 ft 0 in (2.13 m)	215 lb (98 kg)	2003-06-03	Oregon
G	8	Jaden Bradley	6 ft 3 in (1.91 m)	200 lb (91 kg)	2003-09-14	Arizona
F	22	Allen Graves	6 ft 8 in (2.03 m)	225 lb (102 kg)	2006-07-28	Santa Clara
F	32	Trayce Jackson-Davis	6 ft 9 in (2.06 m)	245 lb (111 kg)	2000-02-22	Indiana
F	2	Kawhi Leonard (injured)	6 ft 7 in (2.01 m)	225 lb (102 kg)	1991-06-29	San Diego State
G	55	Alijah Martin	6 ft 2 in (1.88 m)	210 lb (95 kg)	2001-12-06	Florida
G	11	Kevin McCullar Jr. (TW)	6 ft 6 in (1.98 m)	210 lb (95 kg)	2001-03-15	Kansas
F	30	Collin Murray-Boyles	6 ft 7 in (2.01 m)	245 lb (111 kg)	2005-06-10	South Carolina
C	19	Jakob Pöltl	7 ft 0 in (2.13 m)	253 lb (115 kg)	1995-10-15	Utah
G	5	Immanuel Quickley	6 ft 3 in (1.91 m)	190 lb (86 kg)	1999-06-17	Kentucky
G	1	Jamal Shead	6 ft 1 in (1.85 m)	200 lb (91 kg)	2002-07-24	Houston
G	18	Malachi Smith (TW)	6 ft 4 in (1.93 m)	205 lb (93 kg)	1999-12-06	Gonzaga
G	14	Ja'Kobe Walter	6 ft 5 in (1.96 m)	180 lb (82 kg)	2004-09-04	Baylor

Coaches
Head coach
- Darko Rajaković
Assistant(s)
- Mery Andrade
- Michael Batiste
- Vin Bhavnani
- Pat Delany
- Eric Khoury
- Jama Mahlalela
- Jim Sann
- Ivo Simović
- James Wade

Legend
- (DP) Unsigned draft pick
- (FA) Free agent
- (S) Suspended
- (GL) On assignment to G League affiliate
- (TW) Two-way affiliate player
- Injured

Roster
Updated: November 5, 2026

== Standings ==
=== Division ===
Atlantic Division	W	L	PCT	GB	Home	Road	Div	GP
Philadelphia 76ers	13	3	.813	–	6‍–‍2	7‍–‍1	4–1	16
Boston Celtics	11	4	.733	1.5	6‍–‍1	5‍–‍3	4–0	15
New York Knicks	9	6	.600	3.5	4‍–‍3	5‍–‍3	3–3	15
Toronto Raptors	5	10	.333	7.5	2‍–‍6	3‍–‍4	0–4	15
Brooklyn Nets	3	11	.214	9.0	1‍–‍5	2‍–‍6	0–3	14

=== Conference ===
Eastern Conference
#	Team	W	L	PCT	GB	GP
1	Philadelphia 76ers *	13	3	.813	–	16
2	Boston Celtics	11	4	.733	1.5	15
3	Detroit Pistons *	10	4	.714	2.0	14
4	Miami Heat *	9	6	.600	3.5	15
5	Atlanta Hawks	9	6	.600	3.5	15
6	New York Knicks	9	6	.600	3.5	15
7	Cleveland Cavaliers	8	8	.500	5.0	16
8	Orlando Magic	6	8	.429	6.0	14
9	Toronto Raptors	5	10	.333	7.5	15
10	Indiana Pacers	5	10	.333	7.5	15
11	Washington Wizards	5	11	.313	8.0	16
12	Charlotte Hornets	4	10	.286	8.0	14
13	Chicago Bulls	4	10	.286	8.0	14
14	Brooklyn Nets	3	11	.214	9.0	14
15	Milwaukee Bucks	1	15	.063	12.0	16

== Game log ==
=== Preseason ===
2026 preseason game log
Total: 2–3 (Home: 2–1; Road: 0–2)
Preseason: 2–3 (home: 2–1; road: 0–2)

Game	Date	Team	Score	High points	High rebounds	High assists	Location Attendance	Record
1	October 3	Miami	L 105–129	Barrett, Key (15)	Collin Murray-Boyles (9)	Jamal Shead (7)	Centre Vidéotron; 18,474	0–1
2	October 10	L.A. Clippers	W 114–106	RJ Barrett (20)	Scottie Barnes (10)	RJ Barrett (5)	Rogers Arena; 18,872	1–1
3	October 13	New York	W 148–94	Kawhi Leonard (21)	Collin Murray-Boyles (9)	Immanuel Quickley (6)	Scotiabank Arena; 17,884	2–1
4	October 15	@ New York	L 120–122	Scottie Barnes (23)	RJ Barrett (8)	Immanuel Quickley (7)	Madison Square Garden; 19,812	2–2
5	October 16	@ Detroit	L 125–129	Malachi Smith (24)	Allen Graves (8)	Jaden Bradley (5)	Little Caesars Arena; 12,639	2–3

2026–27 preseason schedule

=== Regular season ===
2026–27 game log
Total: 6–10 (Home: 2–6; Road: 4–4)
October: 3–2 (home: 2–1; road: 1–1)

Game	Date	Team	Score	High points	High rebounds	High assists	Location Attendance	Record
1	October 21	Chicago	W 135–92	Tied (23)	Collin Murray-Boyles (8)	Immanuel Quickley (7)	Scotiabank Arena; 19,800	1–0
2	October 23	@ Washington	W 112–102	Scottie Barnes (28)	Scottie Barnes (13)	Immanuel Quickley (6)	Capital One Arena; 18,952	2–0
3	October 25	@ Minnesota	L 94–117	Ja'Kobe Walter (22)	Collin Murray-Boyles (7)	Allen Graves (4)	Target Center; 18,978	2–1
4	October 28	Orlando	W 129–99	Scottie Barnes (28)	Trayce Jackson-Davis (11)	Quickley, Shead (7)	Scotiabank Arena; 19,107	3–1
5	October 30	Orlando	L 114–121	Scottie Barnes (41)	Jakob Pöltl (11)	Quickley, Shead (8)	Scotiabank Arena; 19,364	3–2

November: 3–8 (home: 0–5; road: 3–3)

Game	Date	Team	Score	High points	High rebounds	High assists	Location Attendance	Record
6	November 1	@ L.A. Lakers	L 125–131	Scottie Barnes (29)	RJ Barrett (10)	Immanuel Quickley (7)	Crypto.com Arena; 19,057	3–3
7	November 2	@ L.A. Clippers	W 125–118	Immanuel Quickley (27)	Scottie Barnes (15)	Scottie Barnes (8)	Intuit Dome; 16,044	4–3
8	November 4	@ Denver	L 109–128	RJ Barrett (22)	Scottie Barnes (6)	Immanuel Quickley (7)	Ball Arena; 19,520	4–4
9	November 6	@ Milwaukee	W 121–107	Barrett, Martin (27)	Jakob Poeltl (11)	Jamal Shead (16)	Fiserv Forum; 14,057	5–4
10	November 9	Memphis	L 102–118	Jamal Shead (20)	Jakob Poeltl (7)	Jamal Shead (11)	Scotiabank Arena; 19,106	5–5
11	November 11	Boston	L 93–98	Ja'Kobe Walter (17)	Jakob Poeltl (9)	RJ Barrett (7)	Scotiabank Arena; 19,800	5–6
12	November 12	@ Philadelphia	L 112–123	RJ Barrett (31)	RJ Barrett (14)	Immanuel Quickley (6)	Xfinity Mobile Arena; 20,986	5–7
13	November 15	New York	L 108–112 (OT)	Scottie Barnes (30)	Collin Murray-Boyles (13)	Barrett, Quickley (6)	Scotiabank Arena; 19,800	5–8
14	November 17	New York	L 102–111	Ja'Kobe Walter (25)	Jakob Poeltl (6)	Immanuel Quickley (7)	Scotiabank Arena; 19,800	5–9
15	November 18	Washington	L 99–103	Immanuel Quickley (24)	Jakob Poeltl (9)	Shead, Walter (6)	Scotiabank Arena; 19,007	5–10
16	November 20	@ Detroit	W 105–102	Scottie Barnes (29)	Allen Graves (10)	Immanuel Quickley (10)	Little Caesars Arena; 20,178	6–10
17	November 23	Milwaukee					Scotiabank Arena	–
18	November 27	Brooklyn					Scotiabank Arena	–
19	November 29	Denver					Scotiabank Arena	–

December: 0–0 (home: 0–0; road: 0–0)

Game	Date	Team	Score	High points	High rebounds	High assists	Location Attendance	Record
20	December 1	@ Houston					Toyota Center	–
21	December 3	@ San Antonio					Frost Bank Center	–
22	TBD	TBD					TBD	–
23	TBD	TBD					TBD	–
24	December 13	@ Oklahoma City					Paycom Center	–
25	December 14	@ Charlotte					Spectrum Center	–
26	December 16	San Antonio					Scotiabank Arena	–
27	December 18	Golden State					Scotiabank Arena	–
28	December 20	Houston					Scotiabank Arena	–
29	December 22	@ Washington					Capital One Arena	–
30	December 23	@ Memphis					FedExForum	–
31	December 26	@ Orlando					Kia Center	–
32	December 28	New Orleans					Scotiabank Arena	–
33	December 30	Washington					Scotiabank Arena	–

January: 0–0 (home: 0–0; road: 0–0)

Game	Date	Team	Score	High points	High rebounds	High assists	Location Attendance	Record
34	January 1	L.A. Clippers					Scotiabank Arena	–
35	January 3	L.A. Lakers					Scotiabank Arena	–
36	January 5	@ Cleveland					Rocket Arena	–
37	January 7	Minnesota					Scotiabank Arena	–
38	January 8	Utah					Scotiabank Arena	–
39	January 10	Philadelphia					Scotiabank Arena	–
40	January 12	Detroit					Scotiabank Arena	–
41	January 13	Phoenix					Scotiabank Arena	–
42	January 15	Miami					Scotiabank Arena	–
43	January 17	@ Chicago					United Center	–
44	January 19	Chicago					Scotiabank Arena	–
45	January 20	@ New York					Madison Square Garden	–
46	January 23	@ Brooklyn					Barclays Center	–
47	January 25	@ Boston					TD Garden	–
48	January 27	Dallas					Scotiabank Arena	–
49	January 29	Cleveland					Scotiabank Arena	–
50	January 31	Boston					Scotiabank Arena	–

February: 0–0 (home: 0–0; road: 0–0)

Game	Date	Team	Score	High points	High rebounds	High assists	Location Attendance	Record
51	February 2	@ Dallas					American Airlines Center	–
52	February 4	@ New York					Madison Square Garden	–
53	February 6	Milwaukee					Scotiabank Arena	–
54	February 7	Charlotte					Scotiabank Arena	–
55	February 9	@ Cleveland					Rocket Arena	–
56	February 12	Cleveland					Scotiabank Arena	–
57	February 14	@ Boston					TD Garden	–
58	February 16	@ Atlanta					State Farm Arena	–
59	February 17	@ Charlotte					Spectrum Center	–
All-Star Game
60	February 26	Atlanta					Scotiabank Arena	–
61	February 28	@ Indiana					Gainbridge Fieldhouse	–

March: 0–0 (home: 0–0; road: 0–0)

Game	Date	Team	Score	High points	High rebounds	High assists	Location Attendance	Record
62	March 2	@ Miami					Kaseya Center	–
63	March 3	@ Miami					Kaseya Center	–
64	March 5	Portland					Scotiabank Arena	–
65	March 10	Oklahoma City					Scotiabank Arena	–
66	March 12	@ New Orleans					Smoothie King Center	–
67	March 14	Detroit					Scotiabank Arena	–
68	March 15	@ Philadelphia					Xfinity Mobile Arena	–
69	March 18	@ Indiana					Gainbridge Fieldhouse	–
70	March 19	Sacramento					Scotiabank Arena	–
71	March 21	@ Utah					Delta Center	–
72	March 23	@ Portland					Moda Center	–
73	March 25	@ Golden State					Chase Center	–
74	March 27	@ Sacramento					Golden 1 Center	–
75	March 28	@ Phoenix					Mortgage Matchup Center	–
76	March 31	@ Detroit					Little Caesars Arena	–

April: 0–0 (home: 0–0; road: 0–0)

Game	Date	Team	Score	High points	High rebounds	High assists	Location Attendance	Record
77	April 2	Atlanta					Scotiabank Arena	–
78	April 4	Indiana					Scotiabank Arena	–
79	April 6	Philadelphia					Scotiabank Arena	–
80	April 7	Brooklyn					Scotiabank Arena	–
81	April 9	@ Orlando					Kia Center	–
82	April 11	@ Brooklyn					Barclays Center	–

2026–27 season schedule

== NBA Cup ==
=== East Group A ===
Pos	Team	Pld	W	L	PF	PA	PD	Qualification
1	Orlando Magic	3	3	0	341	324	+17	Advance to knockout stage
2	Toronto Raptors	3	2	1	340	330	+10	Possible knockout stage based on ranking
3	Detroit Pistons	2	1	1	212	199	+13	
4	Brooklyn Nets	2	0	2	205	223	−18	
5	Milwaukee Bucks	2	0	2	206	228	−22	

Updated to game(s) played on November 20, 2026. Source:

== Transactions ==
=== Trades ===
Date	Trade		Ref.
September 14, 2026	To Toronto Raptors: Kawhi Leonard	To Los Angeles Clippers: Brandon Ingram; Gradey Dick; 2027 first-round pick swap right (Note: Oklahoma City has the right to swap picks with Los Angeles, after which the Clippers can swap with Toronto.); 2030 TOR second-round pick; 2031 TOR first-round pick; 2033 TOR first-round pick; 2033 TOR second-round pick	

=== Free agency ===
==== Re-signed ====
Date	Player	Ref.

==== Additions ====
Date	Player	Former Team	Ref.

==== Subtractions ====
Player	Reason	New Team	Ref.
