= Toronto Raptors draft history =

Overview of Toronto Raptors draft picks

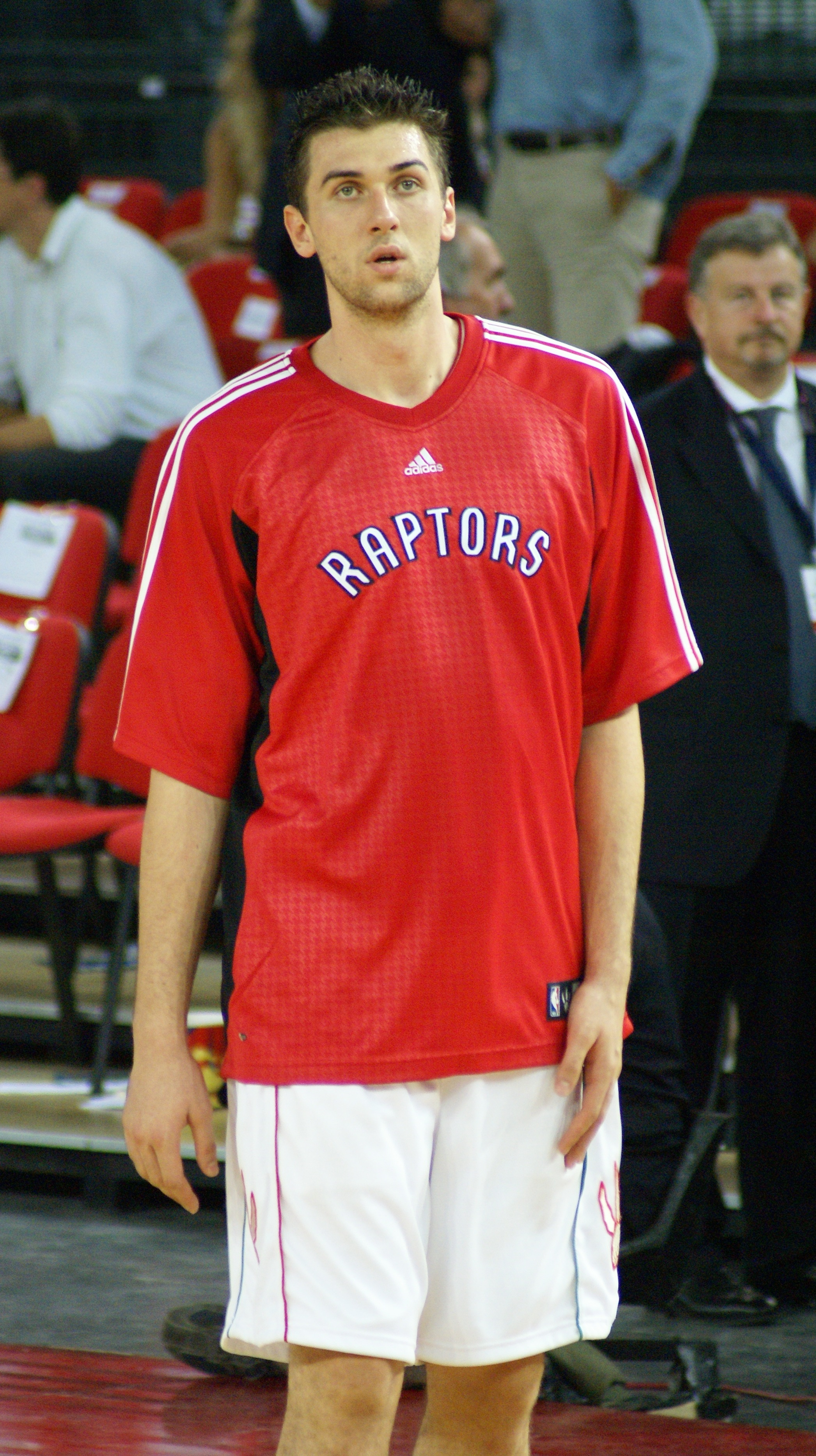
Andrea Bargnani, drafted in 2006, is the Toronto Raptors' only first overall draft pick.

The Toronto Raptors have made 35 National Basketball Association (NBA) draft selections during their draft history. The Raptors began as an expansion team in 1995 and first participated in the NBA draft on June 28, 1995, at SkyDome, now known as Rogers Centre, in Toronto, Ontario, Canada. In 1989, the NBA agreed with the National Basketball Players' Association to limit drafts to two rounds, an arrangement that has remained the same up the present time. Before each draft, an NBA draft lottery determines the first round selection order for the teams that missed the playoffs during the prior season. Teams can also trade their picks, which means that in some drafts teams may have more or less than two draft picks, although they must have at least one first-round pick every other year.

The first pick in Toronto Raptors' history was Damon Stoudamire, a point guard from the University of Arizona, who was the seventh overall pick in the 1995 NBA draft. People in the crowd were surprised by this pick because they expected the Raptors to pick Ed O'Bannon from UCLA. In their second pick of the same draft, Fab Five member Jimmy King from Michigan was drafted in the second round. The Raptors won the first overall pick in 1996, but they had to give that up due to the expansion agreement with the league. Chris Bosh was selected by the Raptors as the fourth pick overall in the 2003 NBA draft, and he went on to play in three all-star games, while starting in two. Andrea Bargnani, who was selected by the Raptors with the first overall pick of the 2006 NBA draft, became the first European to be picked first overall in the NBA draft.

Seven of the players that the Raptors have drafted were named to the NBA All-Rookie Team first team in their respective rookie seasons—Damon Stoudamire in 1996, Marcus Camby in 1997, Morris Peterson in 2001, Chris Bosh in 2004, Charlie Villanueva in 2006, Andrea Bargnani in 2007, and Scottie Barnes in 2022—and Stoudamire and Barnes were named the Rookie of the Year in 1996 and 2022, respectively.

== Key ==
Abbreviation	Meaning
Pos	Position
PG	Point guard
SG	Shooting guard
SF	Small forward
PF	Power forward
C	Center

Naismith Basketball Hall of Famer	First overall NBA draft pick	Selected for an NBA All-Star Game

== Selections ==
Year	Round	Pick	Name	Nationality	Player	College/High School/Club
1995	1	7	Damon Stoudamire	United States	PG	Arizona
1995	2	35	Jimmy King	United States	SG	Michigan
1996	1	2	Marcus Camby	United States	PF/C	Massachusetts
1997	1	9	Tracy McGrady	United States	SG/SF	Mt. Zion Christian Academy
1998	1	4	Antawn Jamison (traded to Golden State)^{[a]}	United States	SF/PF	North Carolina
1998	2	47	Tyson Wheeler (from Portland,^{[b]} traded to Denver)^{[c]}	United States	PG	Rhode Island
1999	1	5	Jonathan Bender (from Denver,^{[c]} traded to Indiana)^{[d]}	United States	PF	Picayune Memorial High School
1999	1	12	Aleksandar Radojević	Yugoslavia	C	Barton County CC
2000	1	21	Morris Peterson (from Minnesota)^{[c]}	United States	SG/SF	Michigan State
2000	2	46	DeeAndre Hulett	United States	SG/SF	College of the Sequoias
2001	1	17	Michael Bradley	United States	PF/C	Villanova
2002	1	20	Kareem Rush (from New York,^{[e]} traded to L.A. Lakers)^{[f]}	United States	SG	Missouri
2003	1	4	Chris Bosh	United States	PF/C	Georgia Tech
2003	2	52	Remon Van de Hare (from L.A. Lakers)^{[f]}	Netherlands	C	FC Barcelona (Spain)
2004	1	8	Rafael Araújo	Brazil	C	Brigham Young
2004	2	39	Albert Miralles (from Cleveland,^{[g]} traded to Miami)^{[h]}	Spain	C	Roseto Basket (Italy)
2005	1	7	Charlie Villanueva	United States	PF	Connecticut
2005	1	16	Joey Graham (from New Jersey)^{[i]}	United States	G/F	Oklahoma State
2005	2	41	Roko Ukić (from Orlando)^{[j]}	Croatia	PG	KK Split (Croatia and Adriatic League)
2005	2	58	Uros Slokar (from Miami)^{[h]}	Slovenia	PF/C	P.A. Udine (Italy)
2006	1	1	Andrea Bargnani	Italy	PF/C	Benetton Treviso (Italy)
2006	2	35	P. J. Tucker	United States	SF	Texas
2006	2	56	Edin Bavčić (from New Orleans,^{[k]} traded to Philadelphia)^{[l]}	Bosnia and Herzegovina	PF	KK Bosna (Bosnia and Herzegovina)
2008	1	17	Roy Hibbert (traded to Indiana)^{[m]}	United States	C	Georgetown
2009	1	9	DeMar DeRozan	United States	SG	USC
2010	1	13	Ed Davis	United States	PF	North Carolina
2011	1	5	Jonas Valančiūnas	Lithuania	C	Lietuvos Rytas (Lithuania)
2012	1	8	Terrence Ross	United States	SG	Washington
2012	2	37	Quincy Acy	United States	PF	Baylor
2012	2	56	Tomislav Zubčić	Croatia	F	Cibona Zagreb (Croatia)
2014	1	20	Bruno Caboclo	Brazil	SF	Pinheiros (Brazil)
2014	2	37	DeAndre Daniels	United States	SF	Connecticut
2014	2	59	Xavier Thames (from Oklahoma City,^{[n]}, traded to Brooklyn)^{[o]}	United States	PG	San Diego State
2015	1	20	Delon Wright	United States	PG	Utah
2016	1	9	Jakob Pöltl (from Denver via New York)	Austria	C	Utah
2016	1	27	Pascal Siakam	Cameroon	PF	New Mexico State
2017	1	23	OG Anunoby	Great Britain	SF	Indiana
2019	2	59	Dewan Hernandez	United States	PF	Miami
2020	1	29	Malachi Flynn	United States	PG	San Diego State
2020	2	59	Jalen Harris	United States	SG	Nevada
2021	1	4	Scottie Barnes	United States	SF	Florida State
2021	2	46	Dalano Banton	Canada	PG	Nebraska
2021	2	47	David Johnson	United States	PG	Louisville
2022	2	33	Christian Koloko	Cameroon	C	Arizona
2023	1	13	Gradey Dick	United States	SG/SF	Kansas
2024	1	19	Ja'Kobe Walter	United States	SG	Baylor
2024	2	1	Jonathan Mogbo	United States	PF	San Francisco
2025	1	9	Collin Murray-Boyles	United States	PF	South Carolina
2025	2	39	Alijah Martin	United States	SG	Florida Athletic

== Notes ==
- ^{a} On June 28, 1998, Toronto acquired the draft rights to Vince Carter and cash considerations from the Golden State Warriors in exchange for the draft rights to Antawn Jamison.
- ^{b} On February 13, 1998, Toronto acquired Kenny Anderson, Gary Trent, Alvin Williams, two first-round draft picks, one second-round draft pick, and cash from the Portland Trail Blazers, in exchange for Damon Stoudamire, Walt Williams, and Carlos Rogers.
- ^{c 1} ^{2} ^{3} On January 21, 1999, Toronto acquired Micheal Williams, the draft rights to Željko Rebrača, a 1999 first-round draft pick from the Denver Nuggets, and a 2000 first-round draft pick from the Minnesota Timberwolves in exchange for Chauncey Billups and the draft rights to Tyson Wheeler being traded to Denver in a three-team deal with Minnesota.
- ^{d} On June 28, 1999, Toronto acquired Antonio Davis from the Indiana Pacers in exchange for the draft rights to Jonathan Bender.
- ^{e} On February 22, 2001, Toronto acquired a first-round draft pick from New York, originally belonged by Seattle, in exchange for Mark Jackson and Muggsy Bogues.
- ^{f 1} ^{2} On June 26, 2002, Toronto acquired Lindsey Hunter, the draft rights to Chris Jefferies and a 2003 second round draft pick from the Los Angeles Lakers in exchange for Tracy Murray, the draft rights to Kareem Rush and a 2003 second round draft pick.
- ^{g} On September 25, 2002, Toronto acquired a second round draft pick from Cleveland Cavaliers and Lamond Murray, in exchange for Michael Stewart and a first round draft pick.
- ^{h 1} ^{2} On June 24, 2004, Toronto acquired the draft rights to Pape Sow and a 2005 second round draft pick from the Miami Heat in exchange for the draft rights to Albert Miralles.
- ^{i} On December 17, 2004, Toronto acquired Eric Williams, Aaron Williams and Alonzo Mourning, along with the 2005, originally belonged to Philadelphia, and 2006, originally belonged to Denver, first round draft picks from the New Jersey Nets in exchange for Vince Carter.
- ^{j} On January 2, 2004, Toronto acquired Robert Archibald along with the 2005 second round draft pick from Orlando Magic for Mengke Bateer, the rights to second-round draft pick Remon van de Hare and the 2005 second round draft pick.
- ^{k} On January 31, 2006, Toronto acquired the 2006, which originally belonged to the Miami Heat, and 2009 second round draft picks from the New Orleans Hornets in exchange for Aaron Williams.
- ^{l} On June 28, 2006, Toronto acquired cash considerations from the Philadelphia 76ers in exchange for the draft rights to Edin Bavčić.
- ^{m} On July 9, 2008, Toronto acquired Jermaine O'Neal and the draft rights to Nathan Jawai from the Indiana Pacers in exchange for T. J. Ford, Rasho Nesterovič, Maceo Baston, and the draft rights to Roy Hibbert.
- ^{n} On July 10, 2013, Toronto acquired the Oklahoma City Thunder second-round pick from the New York Knicks along with Marcus Camby, Steve Novak, Quentin Richardson, a 2016 first-round draft pick, and a 2017 second-round draft pick in exchange for Andrea Bargnani.
- ^{o} On June 26, 2014, Toronto acquired cash considerations from the Brooklyn Nets in exchange for the draft rights to Xavier Thames.
