= Ja'Kobe =

Ja'Kobe is a masculine given name. Notable people with the name include:

- Ja'Kobe Tharp (born 2005), American athlete specializing in high hurdles
- Ja'Kobe Walter (born 2004), American basketball shooting guard
