= 2025–26 Toronto Raptors season =

- Head coach: Darko Rajaković
- General manager: Bobby Webster
- Owners: Maple Leaf Sports & Entertainment
- Arena: Scotiabank Arena

Results
- Record: 46–36 (.561)
- Place: Division: 3rd (Atlantic); Conference: 5th (Eastern)
- Playoff finish: First round (Lost to Cavaliers 3–4)
- Stats at Basketball Reference

Local media
- Television: TSN; Sportsnet

The 2025–26 Toronto Raptors season was the 31st season for the franchise in the National Basketball Association (NBA). Following the conclusion of the 2025 NBA draft, Toronto announced that longtime team president and vice chairman Masai Ujiri had been released from his position.

The Raptors advanced to the 2025 NBA Cup knockout stage as the winner of East Group A after going undefeated in four group stage games. However, they were defeated by the eventual Cup champions New York Knicks in the quarterfinals.

On February 3, 2026, it was announced that their head coach Darko Rajaković would coach Team World in the 2026 NBA All-Star Game, having the most wins among non-American head coaches in the regular season. Scottie Barnes and Brandon Ingram were also named All-Stars. With a win over the Chicago Bulls on February 5, the Raptors were able to improve from their 30–52 record from their previous season. Earlier that day, the Raptors notably traded for veteran guard Chris Paul from the Los Angeles Clippers to clear salary. They subsequently waived him on February 13 and Paul, who did not play a single game with Toronto, subsequently announced his retirement from the NBA after 21 seasons.

On April 12, the Raptors qualified for the playoffs for the first time since the 2022 following their win against the Brooklyn Nets. Toronto finished the regular season with a 46–36 record, the same as the Atlanta Hawks, and secured the 5th seed in the Eastern Conference since they won the tiebreaker over Atlanta via a 4–0 season series sweep. However, the Raptors lost to the Cleveland Cavaliers in seven games of the first round.

== Draft ==
Round	Pick	Player	Position(s)	Nationality	College
1	9	Collin Murray-Boyles	Small Forward	United States	South Carolina
2	39	Alijah Martin	Shooting Guard	United States	Florida

The Raptors entered the draft with one first-round pick and one second-round pick, the latter of which was originally owned by the Portland Trail Blazers and acquired from the Sacramento Kings in 2024. They had traded their original second-round pick to the San Antonio Spurs in a 2023 trade that sent Jakob Poeltl back to Toronto; the pick was eventually used by the Detroit Pistons. The event also marked the final occasion in which longtime team president and vice chairman Masai Ujiri made personnel decisions for the franchise, as he and the Raptors mutually parted ways on June 26, the day after the draft concluded.

== Roster ==
2025–26 Toronto Raptors roster
Players

Pos.	No.	Player	Height	Weight	DOB	From
G/F	4	Scottie Barnes	6 ft 7 in (2.01 m)	237 lb (108 kg)	2001-08-01	Florida State
G/F	9	RJ Barrett	6 ft 6 in (1.98 m)	214 lb (97 kg)	2000-06-14	Duke
F	77	Jamison Battle	6 ft 7 in (2.01 m)	220 lb (100 kg)	2001-05-10	Ohio State
G/F	1	Gradey Dick	6 ft 6 in (1.98 m)	200 lb (91 kg)	2003-11-20	Kansas
G	24	Chucky Hepburn (injured) (TW)	6 ft 2 in (1.88 m)	190 lb (86 kg)	2003-02-09	Louisville
F	3	Brandon Ingram	6 ft 8 in (2.03 m)	190 lb (86 kg)	1997-09-02	Duke
F	32	Trayce Jackson-Davis	6 ft 9 in (2.06 m)	245 lb (111 kg)	2000-02-22	Indiana
G	0	A. J. Lawson	6 ft 6 in (1.98 m)	179 lb (81 kg)	2000-07-15	South Carolina
F/C	54	Sandro Mamukelashvili	6 ft 9 in (2.06 m)	240 lb (109 kg)	1999-05-23	Seton Hall
G	55	Alijah Martin (TW)	6 ft 2 in (1.88 m)	210 lb (95 kg)	2001-12-06	Florida
F	2	Jonathan Mogbo	6 ft 9 in (2.06 m)	225 lb (102 kg)	2001-10-29	San Francisco
F	12	Collin Murray-Boyles	6 ft 7 in (2.01 m)	245 lb (111 kg)	2005-06-10	South Carolina
C	19	Jakob Pöltl	7 ft 0 in (2.13 m)	260 lb (118 kg)	1995-10-15	Utah
G	5	Immanuel Quickley	6 ft 2 in (1.88 m)	190 lb (86 kg)	1999-06-17	Kentucky
G	23	Jamal Shead	6 ft 1 in (1.85 m)	200 lb (91 kg)	2002-07-24	Houston
G/F	17	Garrett Temple	6 ft 5 in (1.96 m)	195 lb (88 kg)	1986-05-08	LSU
G	14	Ja'Kobe Walter (injured)	6 ft 5 in (1.96 m)	180 lb (82 kg)	2004-09-04	Baylor

Coaches
Head coach
- Darko Rajaković
Assistant(s)
- Mery Andrade
- Michael Batiste
- Vin Bhavnani
- Pat Delany
- Eric Khoury
- Jama Mahlalela
- Jim Sann
- Ivo Simović
- James Wade

Legend
- (DP) Unsigned draft pick
- (FA) Free agent
- (S) Suspended
- (GL) On assignment to G League affiliate
- (TW) Two-way affiliate player
- Injured

Roster
Updated: April 11, 2026

== Standings ==
=== Division ===
Atlantic Division	W	L	PCT	GB	Home	Road	Div	GP
y – Boston Celtics	56	26	.683	–	30‍–‍11	26‍–‍15	10‍–‍6	82
x – New York Knicks	53	29	.646	3.0	30‍–‍10	23‍–‍19	14‍–‍3	82
x – Toronto Raptors	46	36	.561	10.0	24‍–‍17	22‍–‍19	5‍–‍12	82
x – Philadelphia 76ers	45	37	.549	11.0	23‍–‍18	22‍–‍19	9‍–‍7	82
Brooklyn Nets	20	62	.244	36.0	12‍–‍29	8‍–‍33	3‍–‍13	82

=== Conference ===
Eastern Conference
#	Team	W	L	PCT	GB	GP
1	c – Detroit Pistons *	60	22	.732	–	82
2	y – Boston Celtics *	56	26	.683	4.0	82
3	x – New York Knicks	53	29	.646	7.0	82
4	x – Cleveland Cavaliers	52	30	.634	8.0	82
5	x – Toronto Raptors	46	36	.561	14.0	82
6	y – Atlanta Hawks *	46	36	.561	14.0	82
7	x – Philadelphia 76ers	45	37	.549	15.0	82
8	x – Orlando Magic	45	37	.549	15.0	82
9	pi – Charlotte Hornets	44	38	.537	16.0	82
10	pi – Miami Heat	43	39	.524	17.0	82
11	Milwaukee Bucks	32	50	.390	28.0	82
12	Chicago Bulls	31	51	.378	29.0	82
13	Brooklyn Nets	20	62	.244	40.0	82
14	Indiana Pacers	19	63	.232	41.0	82
15	Washington Wizards	17	65	.207	43.0	82

== Game log ==
=== Preseason ===
2025 preseason game log
Total: 4–2 (Home: 2–1; Road: 2–1)
Preseason: 4–2 (home: 2–1; road: 2–1)

Game	Date	Team	Score	High points	High rebounds	High assists	Location Attendance	Record
1	October 6	Denver	L 108–112	Barrett, Ingram (19)	Sandro Mamukelashvili (6)	Barnes, Shead (5)	Rogers Arena; 18,654	0–1
2	October 8	@ Sacramento	W 130–122	Brandon Ingram (21)	Mogbo, Murray-Boyles (7)	Collin Murray-Boyles (6)	Golden 1 Center; 16,362	1–1
3	October 10	Boston	W 107–105	Gradey Dick (22)	Gradey Dick (6)	Chucky Hepburn (8)	Scotiabank Arena; 16,282	2–1
4	October 12	@ Washington	W 113–112	Immanuel Quickley (18)	Scottie Barnes (12)	Barnes, Shead (4)	Capital One Arena; 9,403	3–1
5	October 15	@ Boston	L 108–110	Brandon Ingram (20)	Barnes, Ingram (10)	Jamal Shead (7)	TD Garden; 19,151	3–2
6	October 17	Brooklyn	W 119–114	Scottie Barnes (31)	Jakob Pöltl (10)	Immanuel Quickley (10)	Scotiabank Arena; 16,950	4–2

2025–26 preseason schedule

=== Regular season ===
2025–26 game log
Total: 46–36 (Home: 24–17; Road: 22–19)
October: 2–4 (home: 0–2; road: 2–2)

Game	Date	Team	Score	High points	High rebounds	High assists	Location Attendance	Record
1	October 22	@ Atlanta	W 138–118	RJ Barrett (25)	Brandon Ingram (9)	Scottie Barnes (9)	State Farm Arena; 17,811	1–0
2	October 24	Milwaukee	L 116–122	Brandon Ingram (29)	Immanuel Quickley (7)	Immanuel Quickley (8)	Scotiabank Arena; 19,615	1–1
3	October 26	@ Dallas	L 129–139	Scottie Barnes (33)	Scottie Barnes (11)	Jamal Shead (8)	American Airlines Center; 19,232	1–2
4	October 27	@ San Antonio	L 103–121	RJ Barrett (25)	Barnes, Ingram, Murray-Boyles, Quickley (3)	Immanuel Quickley (7)	Frost Bank Center; 18,354	1–3
5	October 29	Houston	L 121–139	Scottie Barnes (31)	Scottie Barnes (5)	Immanuel Quickley (7)	Scotiabank Arena; 17,234	1–4
6	October 31	@ Cleveland	W 112–101	Barrett, Battle, Ingram (20)	Scottie Barnes (10)	Barnes, Quickley (6)	Rocket Arena; 19,432	2–4

November: 12–3 (home: 7–0; road: 5–3)

Game	Date	Team	Score	High points	High rebounds	High assists	Location Attendance	Record
7	November 2	Memphis	W 117–104	RJ Barrett (27)	Scottie Barnes (12)	Scottie Barnes (8)	Scotiabank Arena; 16,746	3–4
8	November 4	Milwaukee	W 128–100	Barnes, Barrett (23)	Jakob Pöltl (9)	Jamal Shead (8)	Scotiabank Arena; 18,357	4–4
9	November 7	@ Atlanta	W 109–97	Brandon Ingram (20)	Barnes, Pöltl (10)	Immanuel Quickley (6)	State Farm Arena; 16,340	5–4
10	November 8	@ Philadelphia	L 120–130	Barrett, Quickley (22)	Brandon Ingram (8)	Barrett, Quickley (6)	Xfinity Mobile Arena; 19,746	5–5
11	November 11	@ Brooklyn	W 119–106	Brandon Ingram (25)	Scottie Barnes (11)	RJ Barrett (6)	Barclays Center; 17,233	6–5
12	November 13	@ Cleveland	W 126–113	Scottie Barnes (28)	Scottie Barnes (10)	Scottie Barnes (8)	Rocket Arena; 19,432	7–5
13	November 15	@ Indiana	W 129–111	Barrett, Pöltl (22)	Scottie Barnes (11)	Immanuel Quickley (7)	Gainbridge Fieldhouse; 17,274	8–5
14	November 17	Charlotte	W 110–108	Brandon Ingram (27)	Immanuel Quickley (10)	Scottie Barnes (6)	Scotiabank Arena; 19,037	9–5
15	November 19	@ Philadelphia	W 121–112	Barrett, Ingram (22)	Scottie Barnes (9)	Quickley, Shead (6)	Xfinity Mobile Arena; 17,077	10–5
16	November 21	Washington	W 140–110	Barrett, Ingram (24)	Jakob Pöltl (9)	Jamal Shead (10)	Scotiabank Arena; 19,800	11–5
17	November 23	Brooklyn	W 119–109	Scottie Barnes (17)	Barnes, Quickley (7)	Jamal Shead (9)	Scotiabank Arena; 18,038	12–5
18	November 24	Cleveland	W 110–99	Brandon Ingram (37)	Jakob Pöltl (13)	Quickley, Shead (7)	Scotiabank Arena; 17,127	13–5
19	November 26	Indiana	W 97–95	Brandon Ingram (26)	Scottie Barnes (10)	Immanuel Quickley (6)	Scotiabank Arena; 18,484	14–5
20	November 29	@ Charlotte	L 111–118 (OT)	Scottie Barnes (30)	Scottie Barnes (12)	Immanuel Quickley (10)	Spectrum Center; 17,060	14–6
21	November 30	@ New York	L 94–116	Immanuel Quickley (19)	Collin Murray-Boyles (8)	Immanuel Quickley (8)	Madison Square Garden; 19,812	14–7

December: 6–8 (home: 3–6; road: 3–2)

Game	Date	Team	Score	High points	High rebounds	High assists	Location Attendance	Record
22	December 2	Portland	W 121–118	Scottie Barnes (28)	Tied (7)	Immanuel Quickley (8)	Scotiabank Arena; 19,203	15–7
23	December 4	L.A. Lakers	L 120–123	Scottie Barnes (23)	Scottie Barnes (11)	Scottie Barnes (9)	Scotiabank Arena; 19,800	15–8
24	December 5	Charlotte	L 86–111	Immanuel Quickley (31)	Brandon Ingram (9)	Scottie Barnes (5)	Scotiabank Arena; 19,800	15–9
25	December 7	Boston	L 113–121	Brandon Ingram (30)	Scottie Barnes (11)	Scottie Barnes (8)	Scotiabank Arena; 18,492	15–10
26	December 9	New York	L 101–117	Brandon Ingram (31)	Jakob Pöltl (9)	Jamal Shead (8)	Scotiabank Arena; 17,801	15–11
27	December 15	@ Miami	W 106–96	Brandon Ingram (28)	Scottie Barnes (10)	Jamal Shead (10)	Kaseya Center; 19,600	16–11
28	December 18	@ Milwaukee	W 111–105	Brandon Ingram (29)	Scottie Barnes (11)	Quickley, Shead (10)	Fiserv Forum; 17,341	17–11
29	December 20	Boston	L 96–112	Ingram, Mamukelashvili (24)	Scottie Barnes (9)	Ingram, Quickley (7)	Scotiabank Arena; 19,533	17–12
30	December 21	@ Brooklyn	L 81–96	Brandon Ingram (19)	Scottie Barnes (6)	Immanuel Quickley (10)	Barclays Center; 17,548	17–13
31	December 23	@ Miami	W 112–91	Scottie Barnes (27)	Collin Murray-Boyles (13)	Mamukelashvili, Quickley (7)	Kaseya Center; 19,801	18–13
32	December 26	@ Washington	L 117–138	Brandon Ingram (29)	Sandro Mamukelashvili (11)	Scottie Barnes (7)	Capital One Arena; 15,575	18–14
33	December 28	Golden State	W 141–127 (OT)	Immanuel Quickley (27)	Scottie Barnes (25)	Scottie Barnes (10)	Scotiabank Arena; 19,800	19–14
34	December 29	Orlando	W 107–106	Jamal Shead (19)	Collin Murray-Boyles (12)	Quickley, Shead (5)	Scotiabank Arena; 19,800	20–14
35	December 31	Denver	L 103–106	Brandon Ingram (30)	Scottie Barnes (14)	Scottie Barnes (10)	Scotiabank Arena; 19,181	20–15

January: 9–6 (home: 3–3; road: 6–3)

Game	Date	Team	Score	High points	High rebounds	High assists	Location Attendance	Record
36	January 3	Atlanta	W 134–117	Barrett, Ingram (29)	Sandro Mamukelashvili (12)	Sandro Mamukelashvili (8)	Scotiabank Arena; 19,028	21–15
37	January 5	Atlanta	W 118–100	Brandon Ingram (19)	Brandon Ingram (9)	Scottie Barnes (10)	Scotiabank Arena; 17,194	22–15
38	January 7	@ Charlotte	W 97–96	RJ Barrett (28)	Collin Murray-Boyles (15)	Jamal Shead (6)	Spectrum Center; 17,337	23–15
39	January 9	@ Boston	L 117–125	Barrett, Walter (19)	Sandro Mamukelashvili (8)	Immanuel Quickley (13)	TD Garden; 19,156	23–16
40	January 11	Philadelphia	W 116–115 (OT)	Scottie Barnes (31)	Collin Murray-Boyles (15)	Scottie Barnes (8)	Scotiabank Arena; 18,130	24–16
41	January 12	Philadelphia	L 102–115	Immanuel Quickley (18)	Brandon Ingram (10)	Brandon Ingram (7)	Scotiabank Arena; 18,127	24–17
42	January 14	@ Indiana	W 115–101	Brandon Ingram (30)	Gradey Dick (11)	Scottie Barnes (13)	Gainbridge Fieldhouse; 15,789	25–17
43	January 16	L.A. Clippers	L 117–121 (OT)	Scottie Barnes (24)	Barnes, Dick (7)	Jamal Shead (13)	Scotiabank Arena; 18,934	25–18
44	January 18	@ L.A. Lakers	L 93–110	Scottie Barnes (22)	Scottie Barnes (9)	Ingram, Quickley (7)	Crypto.com Arena; 18,997	25–19
45	January 20	@ Golden State	W 145–127	Immanuel Quickley (40)	Sandro Mamukelashvili (12)	Scottie Barnes (11)	Chase Center; 18,064	26–19
46	January 21	@ Sacramento	W 122–109	Barnes, Ingram (23)	Mamukelashvili, Mogbo (9)	Immanuel Quickley (8)	Golden 1 Center; 16,182	27–19
47	January 23	@ Portland	W 110–98	Sandro Mamukelashvili (22)	Scottie Barnes (9)	Immanuel Quickley (7)	Moda Center; 17,438	28–19
48	January 25	@ Oklahoma City	W 103–101	Immanuel Quickley (23)	Barnes, Quickley (11)	Scottie Barnes (8)	Paycom Center; 18,203	29–19
49	January 28	New York	L 92–119	Brandon Ingram (27)	Scottie Barnes (10)	Scottie Barnes (5)	Scotiabank Arena; 19,511	29–20
50	January 30	@ Orlando	L 120–130	Brandon Ingram (35)	Scottie Barnes (8)	Barnes, Quickley (6)	Kia Center; 19,163	29–21

February: 6–4 (home: 3–4; road: 3–0)

Game	Date	Team	Score	High points	High rebounds	High assists	Location Attendance	Record
51	February 1	Utah	W 107–100	RJ Barrett (21)	Scottie Barnes (9)	Tied (4)	Scotiabank Arena; 18,749	30–21
52	February 4	Minnesota	L 126–128	Brandon Ingram (25)	Scottie Barnes (10)	Barnes, Quickley (8)	Scotiabank Arena; 18,775	30–22
53	February 5	Chicago	W 123–107	Brandon Ingram (33)	Barnes, Ingram (6)	Jamal Shead (8)	Scotiabank Arena; 18,795	31–22
54	February 8	Indiana	W 122–104	Scottie Barnes (25)	Scottie Barnes (14)	Barnes, Quickley (6)	Scotiabank Arena; 17,876	32–22
55	February 11	Detroit	L 95–113	Immanuel Quickley (18)	Scottie Barnes (7)	Barnes, Quickley (5)	Scotiabank Arena; 19,120	32–23
All-Star Game
56	February 19	@ Chicago	W 110–101	Brandon Ingram (31)	Scottie Barnes (9)	Brandon Ingram (6)	United Center; 20,397	33–23
57	February 22	@ Milwaukee	W 122–94	Immanuel Quickley (32)	Jakob Pöltl (8)	Immanuel Quickley (9)	Fiserv Forum; 17,341	34–23
58	February 24	Oklahoma City	L 107–116	RJ Barrett (21)	RJ Barrett (8)	Scottie Barnes (7)	Scotiabank Arena; 19,153	34–24
59	February 25	San Antonio	L 107–110	Ingram, Quickley (20)	Brandon Ingram (11)	Brandon Ingram (4)	Scotiabank Arena; 19,800	34–25
60	February 28	@ Washington	W 134–125	Immanuel Quickley (27)	Jakob Pöltl (10)	Immanuel Quickley (11)	Capital One Arena; 17,429	35–25

March: 7–8 (home: 5–1; road: 2–7)

Game	Date	Team	Score	High points	High rebounds	High assists	Location Attendance	Record
61	March 3	New York	L 95–111	Brandon Ingram (31)	Jakob Pöltl (7)	Immanuel Quickley (12)	Scotiabank Arena; 19,800	35–26
62	March 5	@ Minnesota	L 107–115	RJ Barrett (25)	Jakob Pöltl (7)	Immanuel Quickley (7)	Target Center; 18,978	35–27
63	March 8	Dallas	W 122–92	RJ Barrett (31)	Jakob Pöltl (10)	Immanuel Quickley (8)	Scotiabank Arena; 19,800	36–27
64	March 10	@ Houston	L 99–113	RJ Barrett (25)	RJ Barrett (6)	Immanuel Quickley (6)	Toyota Center; 18,055	36–28
65	March 11	@ New Orleans	L 111–122	Immanuel Quickley (25)	RJ Barrett (7)	Brandon Ingram (5)	Smoothie King Center; 16,568	36–29
66	March 13	Phoenix	W 122–115	Brandon Ingram (36)	Sandro Mamukelashvili (8)	Jamal Shead (8)	Scotiabank Arena; 19,195	37–29
67	March 15	Detroit	W 119–108	Brandon Ingram (34)	Jakob Pöltl (18)	Scottie Barnes (8)	Scotiabank Arena; 19,435	38–29
68	March 18	@ Chicago	W 139–109	RJ Barrett (23)	Jakob Pöltl (8)	Immanuel Quickley (7)	United Center; 19,082	39–29
69	March 20	@ Denver	L 115–121	Jakob Pöltl (23)	Jakob Pöltl (11)	Barnes, Quickley (8)	Ball Arena; 19,924	39–30
70	March 22	@ Phoenix	L 98–120	Scottie Barnes (17)	Scottie Barnes (5)	Barnes, Shead (6)	Mortgage Matchup Center; 17,071	39–31
71	March 23	@ Utah	W 143–127	RJ Barrett (27)	Scottie Barnes (7)	Jamal Shead (14)	Delta Center; 18,186	40–31
72	March 25	@ L.A. Clippers	L 94–119	Brandon Ingram (18)	Scottie Barnes (8)	Scottie Barnes (12)	Intuit Dome; 17,927	40–32
73	March 27	New Orleans	W 119–106	Scottie Barnes (23)	Jakob Pöltl (11)	Scottie Barnes (12)	Scotiabank Arena; 19,027	41–32
74	March 29	Orlando	W 139–87	RJ Barrett (24)	Jakob Pöltl (7)	Scottie Barnes (15)	Scotiabank Arena; 18,883	42–32
75	March 31	@ Detroit	L 116–127	RJ Barrett (24)	Collin Murray-Boyles (10)	Barnes, Shead (12)	Little Caesars Arena; 19,982	42–33

April: 4–3 (home: 3–1; road: 1–2)

Game	Date	Team	Score	High points	High rebounds	High assists	Location Attendance	Record
76	April 1	Sacramento	L 115–123	Barrett, Murray-Boyles (20)	Sandro Mamukelashvili (6)	Scottie Barnes (10)	Scotiabank Arena; 18,616	42–34
77	April 3	@ Memphis	W 128–96	RJ Barrett (25)	Ja'Kobe Walter (8)	Barnes, Shead (6)	FedExForum; 17,023	43–34
78	April 5	@ Boston	L 101–115	Ja'Kobe Walter (16)	Barnes, Mamukelashvili (6)	Scottie Barnes (8)	TD Garden; 19,156	43–35
79	April 7	Miami	W 121–95	Scottie Barnes (25)	Tied (8)	Jamal Shead (11)	Scotiabank Arena; 18,425	44–35
80	April 9	Miami	W 128–114	Brandon Ingram (38)	Collin Murray-Boyles (8)	Brandon Ingram (7)	Scotiabank Arena; 19,142	45–35
81	April 10	@ New York	L 95–112	Sandro Mamukelashvili (17)	Sandro Mamukelashvili (8)	Brandon Ingram (6)	Madison Square Garden; 19,812	45–36
82	April 12	Brooklyn	W 136–101	RJ Barrett (26)	Scottie Barnes (12)	Scottie Barnes (12)	Scotiabank Arena; 18,778	46–36

2025–26 season schedule

=== Playoffs ===
2026 playoff game log
Total: 3–4 (home: 3–0; road: 0–4)
First Round: 3–4 (home: 3–0; road: 0–4)

Game	Date	Team	Score	High points	High rebounds	High assists	Location Attendance	Series
1	April 18	@ Cleveland	L 113–126	RJ Barrett (24)	Sandro Mamukelashvili (8)	Scottie Barnes (7)	Rocket Arena; 19,432	0–1
2	April 20	@ Cleveland	L 105–115	Scottie Barnes (26)	Sandro Mamukelashvili (10)	Barnes, Barrett (5)	Rocket Arena; 19,432	0–2
3	April 23	Cleveland	W 126–104	Barnes, Barrett (33)	Collin Murray-Boyles (8)	Scottie Barnes (11)	Scotiabank Arena; 19,800	1–2
4	April 26	Cleveland	W 93–89	Barnes, Ingram (23)	Collin Murray-Boyles (10)	Scottie Barnes (6)	Scotiabank Arena; 19,800	2–2
5	April 29	@ Cleveland	L 120–125	RJ Barrett (25)	RJ Barrett (12)	Scottie Barnes (11)	Rocket Arena; 19,432	2–3
6	May 1	Cleveland	W 112–110 (OT)	Scottie Barnes (25)	RJ Barrett (9)	Scottie Barnes (14)	Scotiabank Arena; 19,919	3–3
7	May 3	@ Cleveland	L 102–114	Scottie Barnes (24)	Scottie Barnes (9)	Jamal Shead (7)	Rocket Arena; 19,432	3–4

2026 playoff schedule

=== NBA Cup ===
==== East Group A ====
Pos	Team	Pld	W	L	PF	PA	PD	Qualification
1	Toronto Raptors	4	4	0	458	403	+55	Advanced to knockout rounds
2	Atlanta Hawks	4	2	2	468	472	−4	
3	Cleveland Cavaliers	4	2	2	492	466	+26	
4	Indiana Pacers	4	1	3	431	431	0	
5	Washington Wizards	4	1	3	443	520	−77	

Source: NBA

== Player statistics ==
=== Regular season ===
Player	POS	GP	GS	MP	REB	AST	STL	BLK	PTS	MPG	RPG	APG	SPG	BPG	PPG
Jamal Shead	PG	82	12	1,852	143	444	76	15	545	22.6	1.7	5.4	.9	.2	6.6
Scottie Barnes	PF	80	80	2,681	600	474	114	116	1,448	33.5	7.5	5.9	1.4	1.5	18.1
Sandro Mamukelashvili	C	80	13	1,751	395	151	64	41	893	21.9	4.9	1.9	.8	.5	11.2
Brandon Ingram	SF	77	77	2,604	430	284	58	55	1,655	33.8	5.6	3.7	.8	.7	21.5
Gradey Dick	SG	76	1	1,067	147	51	45	7	455	14.0	1.9	.7	.6	.1	6.0
Ja'Kobe Walter	SG	72	19	1,474	185	86	73	14	541	20.5	2.6	1.2	1.0	.2	7.5
Immanuel Quickley	PG	70	70	2,231	282	415	92	5	1,150	31.9	4.0	5.9	1.3	.1	16.4
Jamison Battle	SF	61	2	517	89	24	7	3	192	8.5	1.5	.4	.1	.0	3.1
RJ Barrett	SF	57	57	1,726	300	189	42	19	1,098	30.3	5.3	3.3	.7	.3	19.3
Collin Murray-Boyles	PF	57	22	1,246	285	106	52	53	484	21.9	5.0	1.9	.9	.9	8.5
Jakob Pöltl	C	46	44	1,149	323	93	40	32	493	25.0	7.0	2.0	.9	.7	10.7
Ochai Agbaji^{†}	SG	42	13	650	95	30	17	11	181	15.5	2.3	.7	.4	.3	4.3
Jonathan Mogbo	PF	40	0	249	68	25	11	8	61	6.2	1.7	.6	.3	.2	1.5
A. J. Lawson	SG	24	0	226	43	7	12	4	101	9.4	1.8	.3	.5	.2	4.2
Alijah Martin	SG	23	0	146	21	12	8	4	51	6.3	.9	.5	.3	.2	2.2
Garrett Temple	SG	22	0	73	9	9	4	2	17	3.3	.4	.4	.2	.1	.8
Trayce Jackson-Davis^{†}	C	17	0	85	33	7	4	5	31	5.0	1.9	.4	.2	.3	1.8
Markelle Fultz	PG	5	0	36	1	8	2	0	4	7.2	.2	1.6	.4	.0	.8
Mo Bamba^{†}	C	2	0	6	2	0	0	1	0	3.0	1.0	.0	.0	.5	.0
Chucky Hepburn	PG	2	0	13	1	2	1	0	0	6.5	.5	1.0	.5	.0	.0

=== Playoffs ===
Player	POS	GP	GS	MP	REB	AST	STL	BLK	PTS	MPG	RPG	APG	SPG	BPG	PPG
Scottie Barnes	PF	7	7	273	43	60	8	12	169	39.0	6.1	8.6	1.1	1.7	24.1
RJ Barrett	SF	7	7	271	49	28	9	2	169	38.7	7.0	4.0	1.3	.3	24.1
A. J. Lawson	SG	7	0	51	3	4	0	2	12	7.3	.4	.6	.0	.3	1.7
Sandro Mamukelashvili	C	7	0	104	35	7	5	3	35	14.9	5.0	1.0	.7	.4	5.0
Collin Murray-Boyles	PF	7	0	191	45	17	9	8	101	27.3	6.4	2.4	1.3	1.1	14.4
Jakob Pöltl	C	7	7	134	42	10	6	6	49	19.1	6.0	1.4	.9	.9	7.0
Jamal Shead	PG	7	4	224	14	35	10	1	63	32.0	2.0	5.0	1.4	.1	9.0
Ja'Kobe Walter	SG	7	5	224	22	10	14	2	78	32.0	3.1	1.4	2.0	.3	11.1
Jamison Battle	SF	6	0	71	11	1	0	0	29	11.8	1.8	.2	.0	.0	4.8
Brandon Ingram	SF	5	5	148	16	11	3	4	60	29.6	3.6	2.2	.6	.8	12.0
Gradey Dick	SG	3	0	4	1	0	0	0	0	1.3	.3	.0	.0	.0	.0
Trayce Jackson-Davis	C	3	0	4	1	0	0	0	2	1.3	.3	.0	.0	.0	.7
Jonathan Mogbo	PF	3	0	4	0	0	0	0	4	1.3	.0	.0	.0	.0	1.3
Garrett Temple	SG	2	0	2	0	1	0	0	0	1.0	.0	.5	.0	.0	.0

- ^{†} Denotes player spent time with another team in the season. Stats reflect time with the Raptors only.

== Transactions ==
=== Trades ===
February 5, 2026	To Toronto Raptors Trayce Jackson-Davis	To Golden State Warriors 2026 LAL second-round pick
February 5, 2026	Three-team trade
February 5, 2026	To Toronto Raptors Chris Paul (from Los Angeles)	To Brooklyn Nets Ochai Agbaji (from Toronto); 2032 TOR second-round pick (from Toronto); Cash considerations (from Los Angeles)
February 5, 2026	To Los Angeles Clippers Draft rights to Vanja Marinković (2019 No. 60) (from Brooklyn)

=== Free agency ===
==== Re-signed ====
Date	Player	Ref.
July 1	Garrett Temple	

==== Additions ====
Date	Player	Former Team	Ref.
July 3	Sandro Mamukelashvili	San Antonio Spurs	
December 29	Mo Bamba	Salt Lake City Stars (NBA G League)	
December 29	Markelle Fultz	Raptors 905 (NBA G League)	

==== Subtractions ====
Date	Player	Reason	New Team	Ref.
July 1	Jared Rhoden	Waived	(France) Paris	
July 21	Orlando Robinson	Free agency	Orlando Magic	
July 28	Colin Castleton	Waived	Orlando Magic	
August 10	Chris Boucher	Free agency	Boston Celtics	
August 11	Cole Swider	Free agency	(Turkey) Anadolu Efes	
February 13	Chris Paul	Waived		
