= Trayce Jackson-Davis =

American basketball player (born 2000)

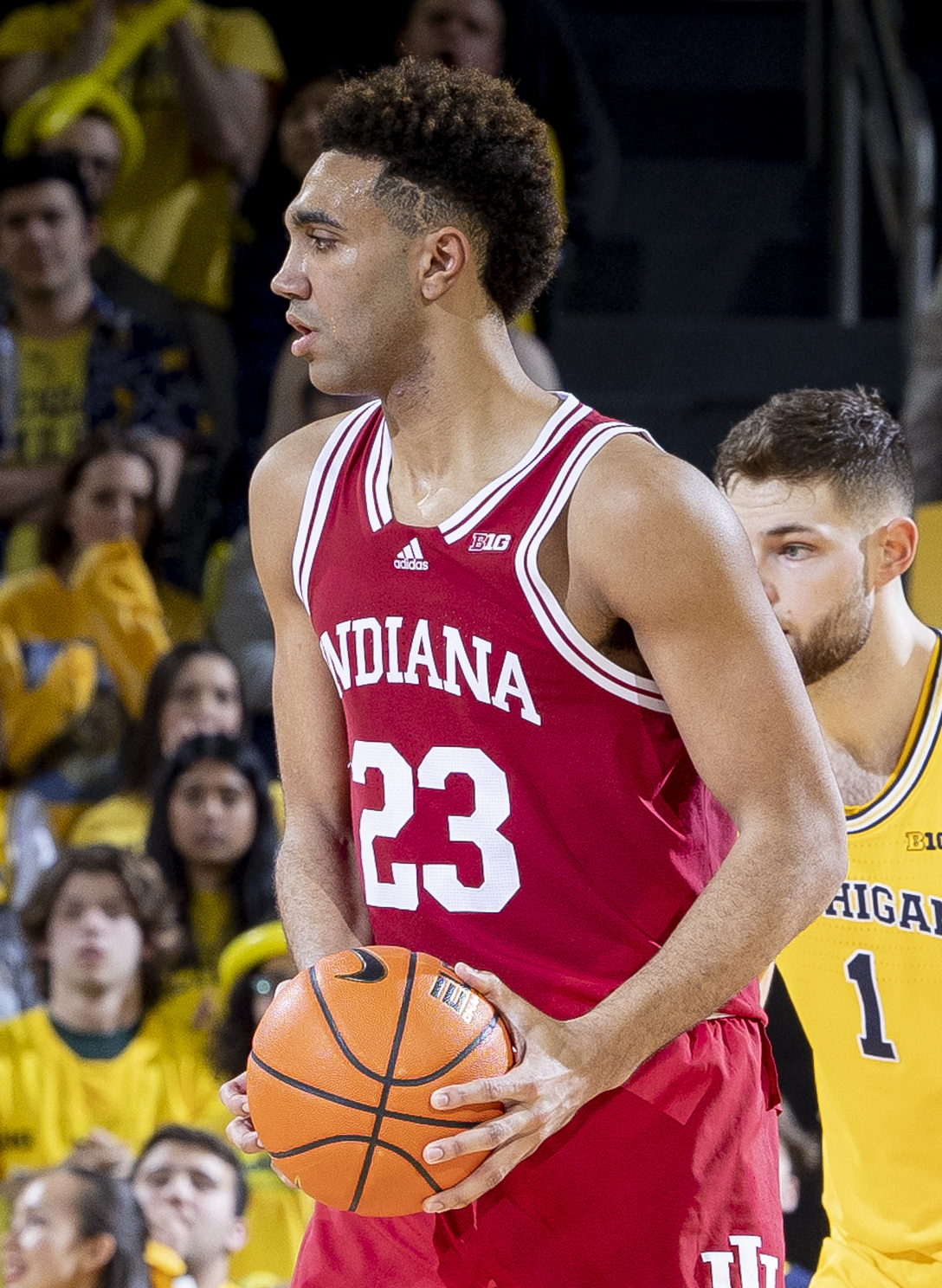
- Jackson-Davis with Indiana in 2023

No. 32 – Toronto Raptors
- Position: Power forward
- League: NBA

Personal information
- Born: February 22, 2000 (age 26) Greenwood, Indiana, U.S.
- Listed height: 6 ft 9 in (2.06 m)
- Listed weight: 245 lb (111 kg)

Career information
- High school: Center Grove (Greenwood, Indiana)
- College: Indiana (2019–2023)
- NBA draft: 2023: 2nd round, 57th overall pick
- Drafted by: Washington Wizards
- Playing career: 2023–present

Career history
- 2023–2026: Golden State Warriors
- 2023, 2025: →Santa Cruz Warriors
- 2026–present: Toronto Raptors

Career highlights
- Consensus first-team All-American (2023); Third-team All-American – USBWA, NABC, SN (2021); Karl Malone Award (2023); First-team All-Big Ten (2023); First-team All-Big Ten – Media (2021); Second-team All-Big Ten (2022); Second-team All-Big Ten – Coaches (2021); Third-team All-Big Ten (2020); Big Ten All-Freshman Team (2020); 2× Big Ten All-Defensive Team (2022, 2023); McDonald's All-American (2019); Indiana Mr. Basketball (2019)
- Stats at NBA.com
- Stats at Basketball Reference
Medals
Men's basketball
Representing the United States
FIBA U18 Americas Championship
Gold medal – first place	2018 St. Catharines	Team

Trayce Jackson-Davis (né Davis; born February 22, 2000) is an American professional basketball player for the Toronto Raptors of the National Basketball Association (NBA). He played college basketball for the Indiana Hoosiers. He was selected 57th overall in the 2023 NBA draft by the Golden State Warriors. Jackson-Davis played nearly 3 full seasons with the Warriors before he was traded to the Raptors in February of 2026.

== Early life ==
Jackson-Davis grew up in Greenwood, Indiana. When he was four, he fractured his skull in a home accident with a resistance band; the surgery left him with scars above both ears. When he was six, an accident with a golf club fractured his cheekbone and eye socket, requiring placement of a titanium screw.

In middle school, he played on the B team; his play greatly improved after a growth spurt in the summer before he started 9th grade.

== High school career ==
Trayce Jackson-Davis attended Center Grove High School in Greenwood. As a junior in 2017–18, he averaged 21.9 points, 9.4 rebounds, 4.1 blocks and 2.6 assists per game while shooting 67.0 percent from the field; he helped his team to a 20-win season, county and sectional titles, and the 4A regional final. In AAU basketball, on the Spiece Indy Heat, he averaged 19.1 points, 7.1 rebounds and 1.8 assists per game while shooting 59.1% from the field. During his senior season, he led the Trojans to a 21–8 record and a berth in the Class 4A state tournament semifinals. He averaged 21.6 points, 9.3 rebounds, 2.9 blocks, 1.7 assists and one steal per game through 29 games. He entered the state semifinals with 1,768 career points. On January 24, 2019, Jackson-Davis was announced as a McDonald's All-American to participate in the 2019 game, where he finished with 7 points, 5 rebounds and 1 block in 14 minutes.

=== Recruiting ===
He was a highly touted recruit considered a four star by many of the main media outlets recruit by Rivals, 247Sports and ESPN. During his high school career Jackson-Davis was recruited by numerous high-profile schools, including Indiana, Michigan State, UCLA, Ohio State, Purdue and Xavier, among others. On November 30, 2018, Jackson-Davis committed to playing college basketball for Indiana after narrowing his choices down to Indiana, Michigan State and UCLA.

College recruiting
Name	Hometown	School	Height	Weight	Commit date
Trayce Jackson-Davis; PF/C	Greenwood, IN	Center Grove (IN)	6 ft 9 in (2.06 m)	231 lb (105 kg)	Nov 30, 2018
Trayce Jackson-Davis; PF/C	Recruit ratings: Rivals: 247Sports: ESPN: (89)				
Overall recruit ranking: Rivals: 35 247Sports: 28 ESPN: 27
Note: In many cases, Scout, Rivals, 247Sports, On3, and ESPN may conflict in their listings of height and weight.; In these cases, the average was taken. ESPN grades are on a 100-point scale.; Sources: "Indiana 2019 Basketball Commitments". Rivals.; "2019 Indiana Hoosiers Recruiting Class". ESPN.; "2019 Team Ranking". Rivals.

== College career ==
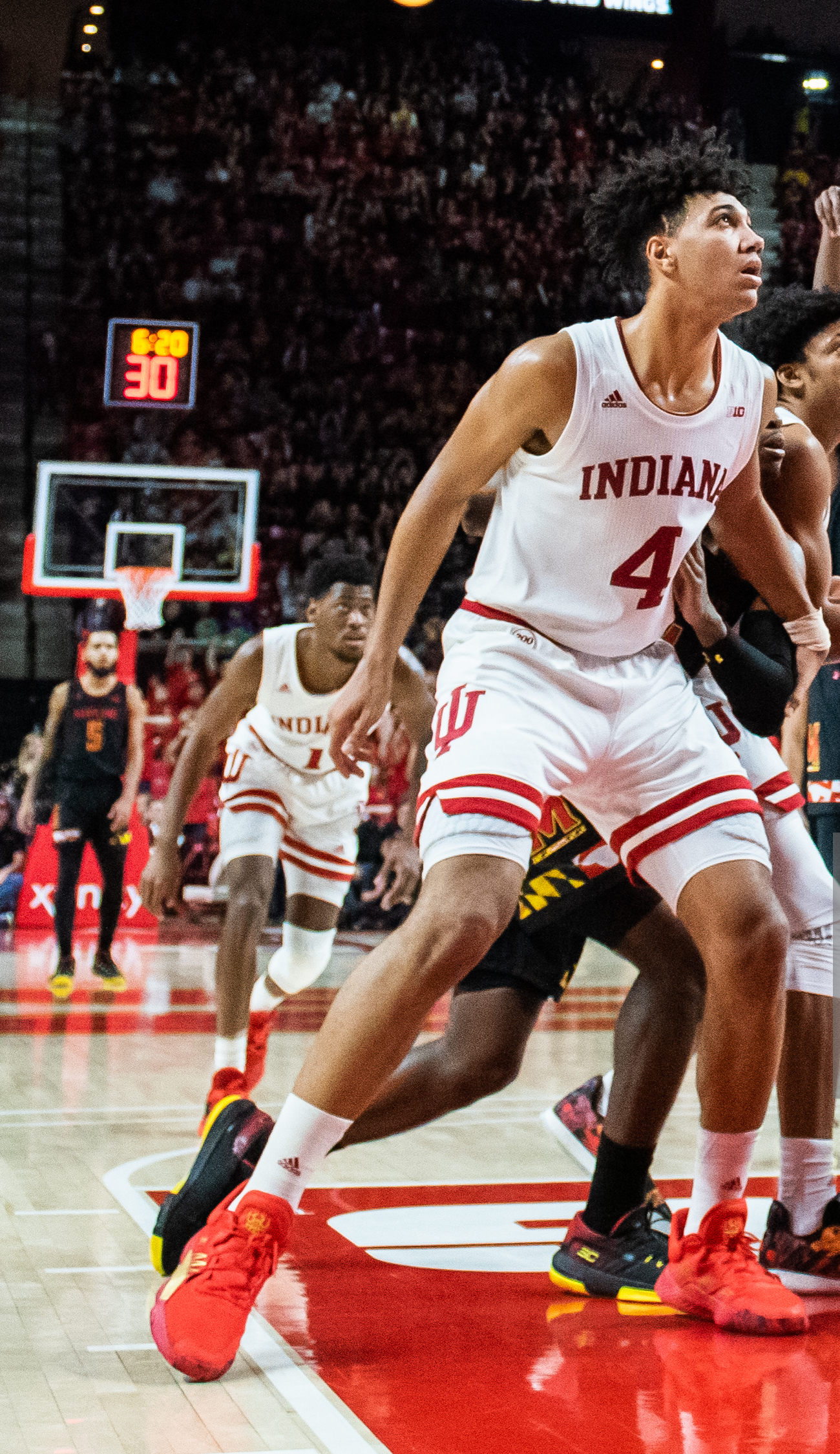
Jackson-Davis (right) in January 2020

Jackson-Davis made his college debut for Indiana during the 2019–20 season with eight points and six rebounds in a 98–65 win over Western Illinois. Jackson-Davis was named Big Ten co-freshman of the week on November 18, after contributing 20 points, eight rebounds and three blocked shots against North Alabama. He was again named conference freshman of the week on December 2 after scoring 21 points and grabbing 11 rebounds in a victory over Louisiana Tech. On February 19, 2020, Jackson-Davis set career highs with 27 points and 16 rebounds in a 68–56 win over Minnesota. At the close of the regular season, Jackson-Davis was named to the third-team All-Big Ten by the coaches and media as well as the All-Freshman Team. He averaged 13.5 points, 8.4 rebounds and 1.8 blocks per game as a freshman. He finished second in the league in field goal percentage (56.6%), and seventh in blocked shots (1.9) and rebounds (8.4). Jackson-Davis, who started in each game his freshman season, was one of only four freshman in the country to lead his team in scoring, rebounding, free throw percentage and blocks.

As a sophomore during the 2020–21 season, Jackson-Davis averaged 19.1 points and 9.0 rebounds per game. Jackson-Davis garnered several awards at the close of the season. He was named a third team All-American by the Sporting News, NABC and USBWA; an honorable mention All-American (AP); All-Big Ten (first team by media and AP; second team by coaches); and a Wooden Award Finalist.

In the offseason prior to Jackson-Davis's junior year, the 2021–22 season, Mike Woodson was hired as head coach of the Hoosiers and Jackson-Davis announced he was returning for his junior season. On November 27, 2021, he scored a career-high 43 points in a 90–79 win over Marshall, becoming the first Indiana player to score at least 40 points in 27 years. On November 30, 2021, he had 31 points, 16 rebounds and three blocks in a 112–110 double-overtime loss to Syracuse. Jackson-Davis was named to the second-team All-Big Ten and Big Ten All-Defensive Team. As a junior, he averaged 18.3 points, 8.1 rebounds and 2.3 blocks per game. He became the second player in Indiana history (with Alan Henderson with 1,500 points, 750 rebounds and 150 blocks, and ranked 15th on Indiana's all-time scoring list with 1,588 points, ninth in rebounds (797), seventh in both blocked shots (178) and field-goal percentage (55.8%). On April 9, 2022, Jackson-Davis declared for the 2022 NBA draft while maintaining his college eligibility. On May 20, 2022, Jackson-Davis announced his withdrawal from the draft and his return to Indiana.

Heading in Jackson-Davis's senior year, the 2022–23 season, he garnered substantial national recognition. He was named, among other things, a Blue Ribbon Preseason First Team All-American, Associated Press Preseason All-American, Almanac Preseason Second Team All-American, CBS Sports Preseason Second Team All-American, Big Ten Preseason Player of the Year, Preseason All-Big Ten Team, and The Athletic Preseason Second Team All-American. His January averages of 23 points, over 14 rebounds and over three blocked shots, was one of only 3 (Shaquille O'Neal and Tim Duncan) such months in the last 25 years. On February 7, 2023, Jackson-Davis scored 20 points and posted 18 rebounds in a 66–60 win against Rutgers, in the process surpassing the 2,000-point mark. He became the first person to win four consecutive Big Ten Player of the Week awards since the award's inception in 1981–82.

In his senior season, Jackson-Davis averaged career bests in points (20.9), rebounds (10.8), assists (4.0), and blocked shots (2.9), helping to lead Indiana to a second-straight NCAA Tournament appearance. His scoring average marked the highest for a Hoosier since Eric Gordon (in 2007–08), his rebounding figure was the highest since Steve Downing (in 1972–73), and his block number was the most since Dean Garrett (in 1987–88).

Jackson-Davis was awarded the Karl Malone Award for the nation's top power forward, along with being named to the Oscar Robertson Trophy Late Season Watch List, the John R. Wooden Men's National Ballot, and the Naismith Trophy Defensive Player of the Year semifinalist list. TJD was also a unanimous choice for the All-Big Ten First Team by the coaches, media, and Associated Press while also collecting All-Big Ten Defensive Team honors.

Jackson-Davis finished his Indiana career as the program's all-time leader in rebounds (1,143) and blocked shots (270), third on the all-time scoring list (2,258), and third in double-doubles (50).

== National team career ==
Jackson-Davis played for the United States under-18 basketball team at the 2018 FIBA Under-18 Americas Championship. He helped his team win the gold medal.

== Professional career ==
=== Golden State Warriors (2023–2026) ===
Jackson-Davis was drafted 57th overall by the Golden State Warriors in the second round in the 2023 NBA draft. The pick was initially held by the Washington Wizards, who traded the rights to Jackson-Davis for cash considerations on draft night.

Jackson-Davis made his regular-season debut against the Sacramento Kings on October 27, 2023, where he only played five minutes and recorded one rebound. Against the New Orleans Pelicans on October 30, Jackson-Davis recorded 13 points, nine rebounds and four blocks in a 130–102 win. On December 19, Jackson-Davis achieved his first double-double, recording 10 points, 13 rebounds and 3 blocks in a 132–126 overtime win against the Boston Celtics. Jackson-Davis recorded a second straight double-double against the Washington Wizards on December 22, having 10 points and 15 rebounds in a 129–118 victory. Jackson-Davis recorded 15 points, 6 rebounds and 4 blocks in a blowout 125–90 win against the Milwaukee Bucks on March 6, 2024, with three of those blocks being against Giannis Antetokounmpo. On April 4, Jackson-Davis recorded a career-high 20 points, combined with 5 rebounds and 4 assists in a 133–110 blowout win against the Houston Rockets. During the 2023–2024 season, Jackson-Davis averaged 1.1 blocks per game, which was fourth among rookies.

On March 9, 2025, Jackson-Davis was sent back to the Santa Cruz Warriors. Jackson-Davis said this is not some sort of punishment or demotion, but more so an opportunity as he has not been getting consistent minutes. He made 62 appearances (including 37 starts) for Golden State during the 2024–25 NBA season, averaging 6.6 points, 5.0 rebounds and 1.7 assists.

Jackson-Davis played in 36 games (including one start) for the Warriors during the 2025–26 season, recording averages of 4.2 points, 3.1 rebounds and 0.9 assists.

=== Toronto Raptors (2026–present) ===
On February 5, 2026, Jackson-Davis was traded to the Toronto Raptors in exchange for a 2026 second-round draft pick. He debuted with the Raptors in a 122–104 victory over the Indiana Pacers on February 8, recording 10 points and 10 rebounds in 15 minutes. With this performance, Jackson-Davis became the fifth player in franchise history to record a double-double in their debut.

== Career statistics ==
Legend
GP	Games played	GS	Games started	MPG	Minutes per game
FG%	Field goal percentage	3P%	3-point field goal percentage	FT%	Free throw percentage
RPG	Rebounds per game	APG	Assists per game	SPG	Steals per game
BPG	Blocks per game	PPG	Points per game	**Bold**	Career high

=== NBA ===
==== Regular season ====
Year	Team	GP	GS	MPG	FG%	3P%	FT%	RPG	APG	SPG	BPG	PPG
2023–24	Golden State	**68**	16	**16.6**	**.702**	.000	.561	5.0	1.2	**.4**	**1.1**	**7.9**
2024–25	Golden State	62	**37**	15.6	.576	.000	**.578**	5.0	**1.7**	**.4**	.6	6.6
2025–26	Golden State	36	1	11.4	.588	**1.000**	.558	3.1	.9	**.4**	.5	4.2
2025–26	Toronto	17	0	5.0	.500	–	.409	1.9	.4	.2	.3	1.8
Career		182	54	14.2	.631	.200	.555	4.4	1.2	.4	.8	6.2

==== Playoffs ====
Year	Team	GP	GS	MPG	FG%	3P%	FT%	RPG	APG	SPG	BPG	PPG
2025	Golden State	**9**	**3**	**8.9**	**.889**	—	.385	**2.3**	**.2**	**.3**	**.2**	**4.1**
2026	Toronto	3	0	1.3	.000	—	**1.000**	.3	.0	.0	.0	.7
Career		12	3	7.0	.842	—	.467	1.8	.2	.3	.2	3.3

=== College ===
Year	Team	GP	GS	MPG	FG%	3P%	FT%	RPG	APG	SPG	BPG	PPG
2019–20	Indiana	32	32	29.3	.566	—	.685	8.4	1.2	.7	1.8	13.5
2020–21	Indiana	27	27	34.3	.517	—	.655	9.0	1.4	.7	1.4	19.1
2021–22	Indiana	**35**	**35**	32.3	**.589**	.000	.674	8.1	1.9	.6	2.3	18.3
2022–23	Indiana	32	32	**34.5**	.581	—	**.695**	**10.8**	**4.0**	**.8**	**2.9**	**20.9**
Career		126	126	32.5	.565	.000	.676	9.1	2.2	.7	2.1	17.9

== Personal life ==
Jackson-Davis is the biological son of Dale Davis (former Indiana Pacers power forward/center). However, he was raised by his mother and his stepfather, former Washington State Cougars football player Ray Jackson. Originally, Jackson-Davis just went by the last name of Davis; however, entering his freshman year of high school, he decided to hyphenate his last name and add "Jackson". He stated, "When I got to high school, I didn't think it was fair. Ray raised me my whole life, so I did Jackson-Davis. They both want the best out of me, but I would say they do it at different angles." Jackson-Davis has a sister, Arielle Bellian (née Jackson), and two brothers. His brother Shaun played basketball in Europe and for the Harlem Globetrotters; his younger brother Tayven Jackson was a high school teammate at Center Grove and went on to play quarterback in college for the University of Tennessee for one year before transferring to Indiana University, UCF and UNT.

On March 15, 2019, Jackson-Davis was honored as the Indiana Gatorade Player of the Year. He received the award not only for his athletic abilities, but also for his academic discipline in maintaining a B average, and his exemplary character in which he volunteered locally as a youth basketball coach and at the Wheeler Mission Center in Indianapolis, serving the homeless and those in need.

== See also ==
- List of NCAA Division I men's basketball players with 2,000 points and 1,000 rebounds
- List of second-generation NBA players
