= Immanuel Quickley =

American basketball player (born 1999)

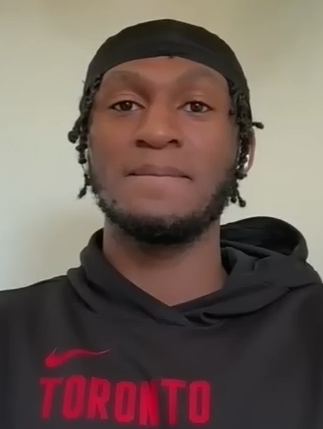
- Quickley in 2024

No. 5 – Toronto Raptors
- Position: Point guard / shooting guard
- League: NBA

Personal information
- Born: June 17, 1999 (age 27) Havre de Grace, Maryland, U.S.
- Listed height: 6 ft 3 in (1.91 m)
- Listed weight: 190 lb (86 kg)

Career information
- High school: The John Carroll School (Bel Air, Maryland)
- College: Kentucky (2018–2020)
- NBA draft: 2020: 1st round, 25th overall pick
- Drafted by: Oklahoma City Thunder
- Playing career: 2020–present

Career history
- 2020–2023: New York Knicks
- 2023–present: Toronto Raptors

Career highlights
- NBA All-Rookie Second Team (2021); SEC Player of the Year – Coaches (2020); First-team All-SEC (2020); McDonald's All-American (2018)
- Stats at NBA.com
- Stats at Basketball Reference
Medals
Men's basketball
Representing United States
FIBA Under-19 World Cup
Bronze medal – third place	2017 Egypt
FIBA U17 World Cup
Gold medal – first place	2016 Spain	National team

Immanuel Jaylen Quickley (born June 17, 1999) is an American professional basketball player for the Toronto Raptors of the National Basketball Association (NBA). He played college basketball for the Kentucky Wildcats and was selected by the Oklahoma City Thunder in the first round of the 2020 NBA draft, but was traded to the New York Knicks before the start of his rookie season. After nearly four seasons with New York, Quickley was traded to the Raptors in 2023 as part of a package which sent forward OG Anunoby to the Knicks, making him become the starting point guard for Toronto.

== Early life ==
While attending The John Carroll School, Quickley had a breakout sophomore campaign and averaged 17.7 points, 3.9 rebounds, 2.9 assists and 1.5 steals per game. He sunk a 3-pointer at the buzzer to lead the Patriots to a 51–50 win over future NBA player Jalen Smith and Mount Saint Joseph High School in the Baltimore Catholic League championship and earned All-Metro Player of the Year recognition. Quickley averaged 23.7 points and 7.2 assists per game as a junior and was named to the First Team All-Metro. Coming into his senior year, Quickley shot 41 percent from behind the arc on the Adidas AAU circuit. Quickley was named the MVP of his high school team after scoring 19 points in a 71–58 loss to Hudson Catholic High School in the HoopHall Classic as a senior. He posted 20.8 points, 6.7 rebounds, 6.7 assists and 3.7 steals per game as a senior and led the team to the Maryland Interscholastic Athletic Association A Conference title. Quickley was named a McDonald's All-American and participated in the Powerade Jam Fest 3-point shootout.

When considering colleges, by August 23, 2017, Quickley had narrowed the selection down to three: Kansas, Kentucky, and Miami. The 22nd ranked prospect by Rivals and 25th by ESPN, Quickley committed to Kentucky on September 22.

College recruiting
Name	Hometown	School	Height	Weight	Commit date
Immanuel Quickley; PG	Havre de Grace, MD	The John Carroll School (MD)	6 ft 3 in (1.91 m)	180 lb (82 kg)	Sep 22, 2017
Immanuel Quickley; PG	Recruit ratings: Rivals: 247Sports: ESPN: (90)				
Overall recruit ranking: Rivals: 22 247Sports: 19 ESPN: 25
Note: In many cases, Scout, Rivals, 247Sports, On3, and ESPN may conflict in their listings of height and weight.; In these cases, the average was taken. ESPN grades are on a 100-point scale.; Sources: "Kentucky 2018 Basketball Commitments". Rivals.; "2018 Kentucky Wildcats Recruiting Class". ESPN.; "2018 Team Ranking". Rivals.

== College career ==
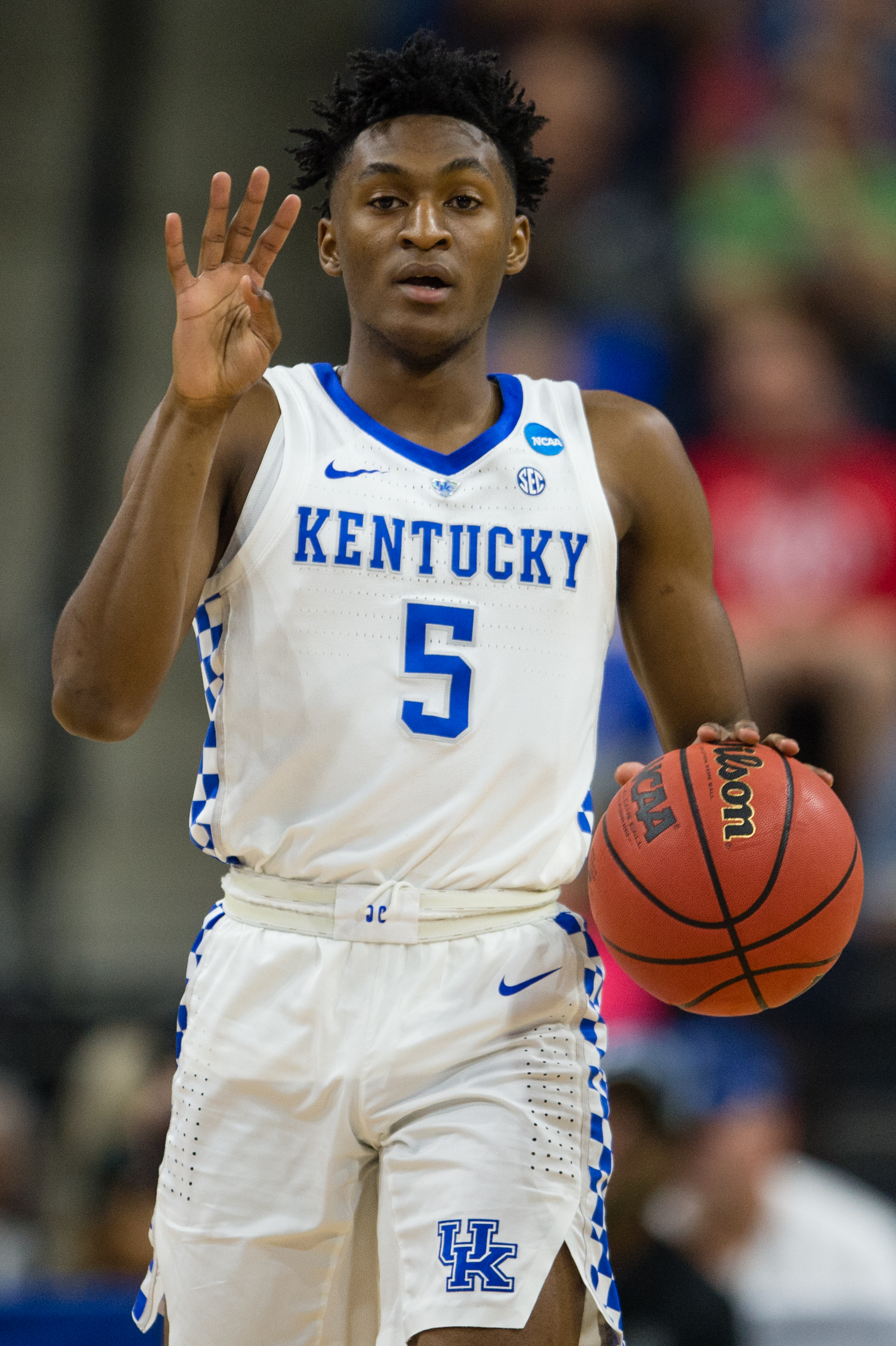
Quickley with Kentucky in 2019

As a freshman, Quickley averaged 5.2 points, 1.8 rebounds and 1.2 assists per game. Quickley scored 16 points in a 91–49 win against Eastern Kentucky on November 8, 2019. He had 18 points in a 78–70 overtime win over rival Louisville on December 28. Quickley hit a career-high eight three-pointers en route to a career-high 30 points in a 69–60 win over Texas A&M on February 25, 2020. At the conclusion of the regular season, Quickley was named SEC Player of the Year as well as the SEC First Team. He averaged 16.1 points and 4.2 rebounds per game as a sophomore. Following the season, Quickley opted to declare for the 2020 NBA draft and hired an agent.

== Professional career ==
=== New York Knicks (2020–2023) ===
Quickley was drafted by the Oklahoma City Thunder with the 25th overall pick in the 2020 NBA draft, and was then traded to the New York Knicks as part of a package for the 23rd pick, Leandro Bolmaro, on November 20, 2020. On November 28, Quickley signed with the Knicks. In his NBA debut on December 23, Quickley scored five points and exited the game in the second quarter due to injury. He returned from injury on January 2, 2021, scoring nine points in the Knicks' 106–102 win over the Indiana Pacers. April 3, 2022, Quickley recorded his first career triple-double with 20 points, 10 rebounds, and 10 assists in a 118–88 win over the Orlando Magic.

On March 5, 2023, Quickley posted a career-high 38 points in a 131-129 double overtime win over the Boston Celtics. On March 27, Quickley posted a new career-high 40 points in a 137–115 victory over the Houston Rockets. That year, Quickley finished second in the voting for the Sixth Man of the Year Award.

=== Toronto Raptors (2023–present) ===
On December 30, 2023, the Knicks traded Quickley, along with RJ Barrett and a 2024 second-round draft pick, to the Toronto Raptors in exchange for OG Anunoby, Precious Achiuwa, and Malachi Flynn. According to Michael Grange of Sportsnet, "the fit was obvious: he was a floor-spacing guard equally comfortable with the ball and playing off of it, making him the perfect theoretical complement to Raptors cornerstone Scottie Barnes."

On March 7, 2024, Quickley achieved a new career high of 18 assists and also recorded 21 points and 9 rebounds in a 120–113 loss against the Phoenix Suns, which is tied for the 6th most in total assists by a Raptor, and it was one less rebound needed for a triple-double. On April 5, Quickley helped the Raptors break their 15-game losing streak, scoring 25 points in a 117–111 win over the Milwaukee Bucks.

On July 8, 2024, Quickley re-signed on a 5-year, $175 million contract to remain with the Raptors. In the 2024–25 NBA season, Quickley struggled with injuries, playing in only 33 games, along with being on a minutes restriction for many of the games he played in.

On January 7, 2026, Quickley made a buzzer-beating three-point shot to give the Raptors a 97-96 victory over the Charlotte Hornets. On January 20, Quickley scored 40 points (tying a career-high) on 11-of-13 shooting in a 145-127 win over the Golden State Warriors, a performance described as the most efficient 40-point game in league history. On January 26, he was named the Eastern Conference Player of the Week after averaging 25.3 points, 6.8 rebounds, 6.8 assists, and 2.0 steals, contributing to Toronto's 4–0 record over a road trip. After suffering a hamstring injury in Toronto's final regular season game, the Raptors officially ruled Quickley out for the remainder of the postseason on April 24.

== National team career ==
Quickley played for the U.S. national under-19 team in the 2017 FIBA Under-19 Basketball World Cup, where he was coached by John Calipari.

== Career statistics ==
Legend
GP	Games played	GS	Games started	MPG	Minutes per game
FG%	Field goal percentage	3P%	3-point field goal percentage	FT%	Free throw percentage
RPG	Rebounds per game	APG	Assists per game	SPG	Steals per game
BPG	Blocks per game	PPG	Points per game	**Bold**	Career high

=== NBA ===
==== Regular season ====
Year	Team	GP	GS	MPG	FG%	3P%	FT%	RPG	APG	SPG	BPG	PPG
2020–21	New York	64	3	19.4	.395	.389	**.891**	2.1	2.0	.5	**.2**	11.4
2021–22	New York	78	3	23.1	.392	.346	.881	3.2	3.5	.7	.0	11.3
2022–23	New York	**81**	21	28.9	.448	.370	.819	4.2	3.4	1.0	**.2**	14.9
2023–24	New York	30	0	24.0	**.454**	**.395**	.872	2.6	2.5	.5	.1	15.0
2023–24	Toronto	38	38	**33.3**	.422	**.395**	.841	**4.8**	**6.8**	.9	**.2**	**18.6**
2024–25	Toronto	33	33	27.8	.420	.378	.867	3.5	5.8	.7	.1	17.1
2025–26	Toronto	70	**70**	31.9	.443	.374	.821	4.0	5.9	**1.3**	.1	16.4
Career		394	168	26.7	.426	.375	.852	3.5	4.1	.8	.1	14.4

==== Playoffs ====
Year	Team	GP	GS	MPG	FG%	3P%	FT%	RPG	APG	SPG	BPG	PPG
2021	New York	5	0	15.4	.303	**.364**	.714	1.4	**1.0**	**.6**	.0	5.8
2023	New York	**8**	0	**21.9**	**.348**	.243	**.850**	**1.6**	**1.0**	.5	.0	**9.0**
Career		13	0	19.4	.333	.271	.815	1.5	1.0	.5	.0	7.8

=== College ===
Year	Team	GP	GS	MPG	FG%	3P%	FT%	RPG	APG	SPG	BPG	PPG
2018–19	Kentucky	**37**	7	18.5	.372	.345	.828	1.8	1.2	.4	.0	5.2
2019–20	Kentucky	30	**20**	**33.0**	**.417**	**.428**	**.923**	**4.2**	**1.9**	**.9**	**.1**	**16.1**
Career		67	27	25.0	.403	.397	.895	2.9	1.5	.6	.1	10.1
