= Jamison Battle =

American basketball player (born 2001)

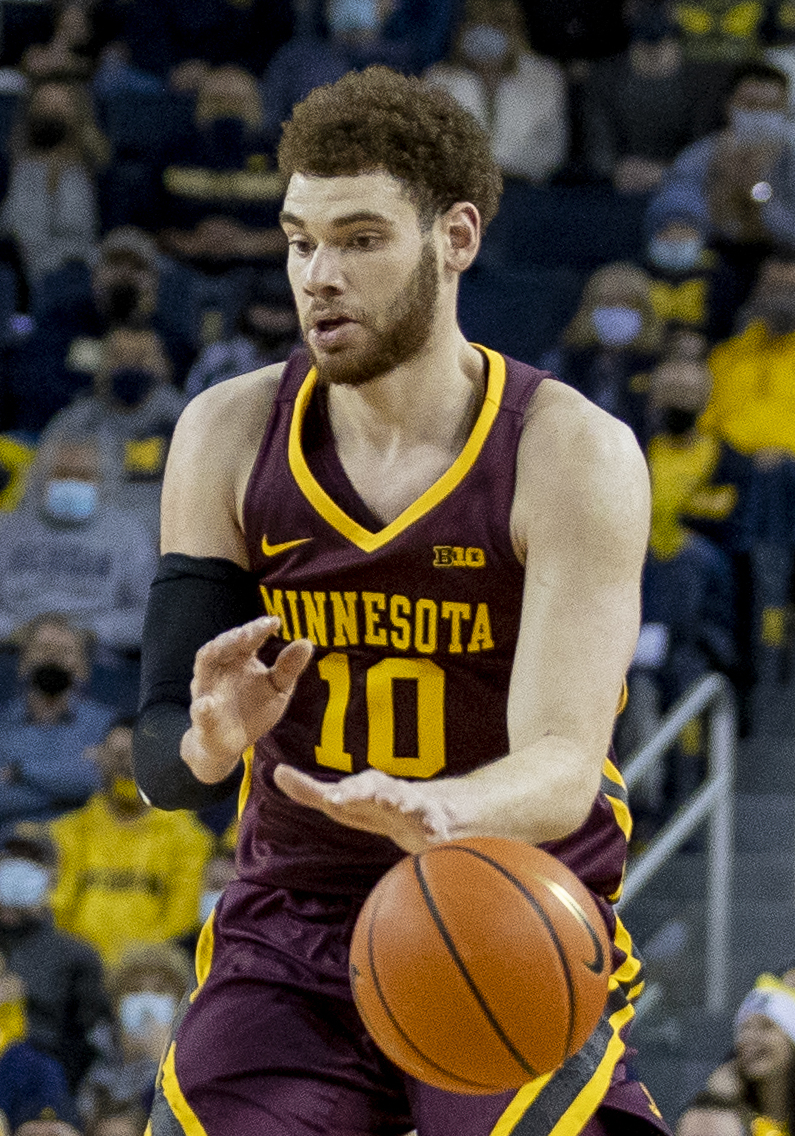
- Battle with Minnesota in 2021

No. 77 – Toronto Raptors
- Position: Small forward
- League: NBA

Personal information
- Born: May 10, 2001 (age 25) Robbinsdale, Minnesota, U.S.
- Listed height: 6 ft 7 in (2.01 m)
- Listed weight: 220 lb (100 kg)

Career information
- High school: DeLaSalle (Minneapolis, Minnesota)
- College: George Washington (2019–2021); Minnesota (2021–2023); Ohio State (2023–2024)
- NBA draft: 2024: undrafted
- Playing career: 2024–present

Career history
- 2024–present: Toronto Raptors

Career highlights
- Third-team Academic All-American (2024); Third-team All-Atlantic 10 (2021); Atlantic 10 All-Rookie Team (2020)
- Stats at NBA.com
- Stats at Basketball Reference

Jamison P. Battle (born May 10, 2001) is an American professional basketball player for the Toronto Raptors of the National Basketball Association (NBA). He played college basketball for the George Washington Colonials of the Atlantic 10 Conference, and the Minnesota Golden Gophers and Ohio State Buckeyes of the Big Ten Conference.

== High school career ==
Battle played basketball for DeLaSalle High School in Minneapolis, Minnesota, where he was teammates with Tyrell Terry. As a senior, he averaged 21.2 points and nine rebounds per game, helping his team win the Class 3A state title.

== College career ==
As a freshman at George Washington, Battle averaged 11.8 points and 5.2 rebounds per game, and was named to the Atlantic 10 All-Rookie Team. He set a program single-season record with 89 three-pointers, which also led the conference. On January 3, 2021, Battle posted a career-high 29 points and seven rebounds in a 75–73 win against Duquesne. As a sophomore, he averaged 17.3 points and 5.2 rebounds per game, earning Third Team All-Atlantic 10 honors. For his junior season, Battle transferred to Minnesota to play under first-year head coach Ben Johnson. He was named Honorable Mention All-Big Ten. Battle averaged 17.5 points and 6.3 rebounds per game as a junior. As a senior, he averaged 12.4 points per game. Battle transferred to Ohio State for his final collegiate season.

Battle passed the 2,000 career point mark in his final game, a loss to Georgia in the 2024 National Invitation Tournament.

== Professional career ==
=== Toronto Raptors/Raptors 905 (2024–present) ===
After going undrafted in the 2024 NBA draft, Battle signed with the Toronto Raptors on July 16, 2024, and on October 19 Toronto converted his deal into a two-way contract. On November 27, Battle scored a career-high 24 points on 9-of-11 shooting, including 6-of-8 three-pointers, in a 119-93 road win against the New Orleans Pelicans. Battle's contract was converted into a standard, three-year contract on February 7, 2025.

On April 23, 2026, Battle scored 14 points in 16 minutes off the bench, contributing to the Raptors' 126-104 victory during Game 3 of the first round playoff series against Cleveland Cavaliers. All of the points were scored in the fourth quarter, helping to fuel an offensive run that secured the win and bring the series to 2-1. Battle's performance included a perfect shooting night, as he made all of his field goal attempts.

== Career statistics ==
Legend
GP	Games played	GS	Games started	MPG	Minutes per game
FG%	Field goal percentage	3P%	3-point field goal percentage	FT%	Free throw percentage
RPG	Rebounds per game	APG	Assists per game	SPG	Steals per game
BPG	Blocks per game	PPG	Points per game	**Bold**	Career high

=== NBA ===
==== Regular season ====
Year	Team	GP	GS	MPG	FG%	3P%	FT%	RPG	APG	SPG	BPG	PPG
2024–25	Toronto	59	**10**	**17.7**	.429	.405	**.889**	**2.7**	**.9**	**.3**	**.2**	**7.1**
2025–26	Toronto	**61**	2	8.5	**.510**	**.412**	.643	1.5	.4	.1	.0	3.1
Career		120	12	13.0	.453	.407	.781	2.1	.6	.2	.1	5.1

==== Playoffs ====
Year	Team	GP	GS	MPG	FG%	3P%	FT%	RPG	APG	SPG	BPG	PPG
2026	Toronto	6	0	11.8	.579	.636	–	1.8	.2	.0	.0	4.8
Career		6	0	11.8	.579	.636	–	1.8	.2	.0	.0	4.8

=== College ===
Year	Team	GP	GS	MPG	FG%	3P%	FT%	RPG	APG	SPG	BPG	PPG
2019–20	George Washington	32	30	35.3	.399	.366	.846	5.2	.6	.4	**.4**	11.8
2020–21	George Washington	15	15	36.5	**.475**	.354	.787	5.2	.7	**.9**	.3	17.3
2021–22	Minnesota	29	29	**36.7**	.450	.366	.759	**6.3**	1.0	.4	**.4**	**17.5**
2022–23	Minnesota	27	27	35.6	.371	.311	.781	3.8	**1.7**	.6	**.4**	12.4
2023–24	Ohio State	**35**	**35**	31.4	.469	**.433**	**.926**	5.2	1.4	.4	.2	15.3
Career		138	136	34.8	.431	.369	.833	5.2	1.1	.5	.4	14.6

== Personal life ==
Battle's father, Terrell, played college basketball for Winston-Salem State and is a general manager at Life Time Fitness. His younger half-sister, Amaya, played basketball for Hopkins High School followed by Minnesota She currently plays in Italy for Logiman Broni.

Starting in fifth grade, Jamison Battle played the Saxophone. He also performed at a Christmas video at George Washington University.
