= Jakob Pöltl =

Austrian basketball player (born 1995)

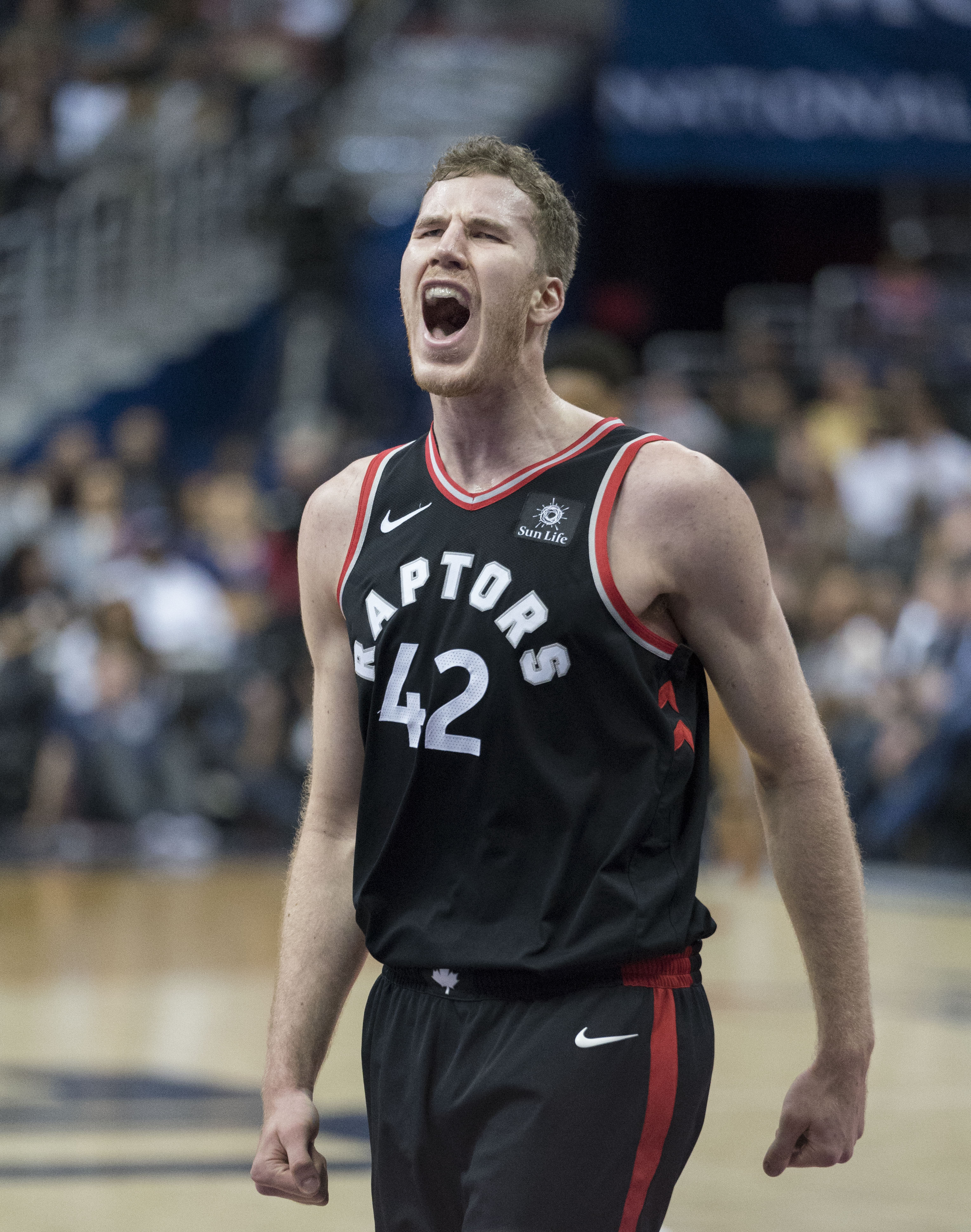
- Pöltl with the Toronto Raptors in 2018

No. 19 – Toronto Raptors
- Position: Center
- League: NBA

Personal information
- Born: October 15, 1995 (age 31) Vienna, Austria
- Listed height: 7 ft 0 in (2.13 m)
- Listed weight: 253 lb (115 kg)

Career information
- College: Utah (2014–2016)
- NBA draft: 2016: 1st round, 9th overall pick
- Drafted by: Toronto Raptors
- Playing career: 2013–present

Career history
- 2013–2014: Traiskirchen Lions
- 2016–2018: Toronto Raptors
- 2016–2017: →Raptors 905
- 2018–2023: San Antonio Spurs
- 2023–present: Toronto Raptors

Career highlights
- NBA D-League champion (2017); Consensus second-team All-American (2016); Pete Newell Big Man Award (2016); Kareem Abdul-Jabbar Award (2016); Pac-12 Player of the Year (2016); First-team All-Pac-12 (2016); Pac-12 All-Freshman Team (2015)
- Stats at NBA.com
- Stats at Basketball Reference

Jakob Pöltl (or Poeltl, German pronunciation: ['ja:kop 'pœltl]; born October 15, 1995) is an Austrian professional basketball player for the Toronto Raptors of the National Basketball Association (NBA). He played college basketball for the Utah Utes.

In his sophomore year for the Utes, Pöltl was a consensus second-team All-American, and won the Kareem Abdul-Jabbar Award and Pete Newell Big Man Award as the top collegiate center and low-post player, respectively. After the season, he declared for the 2016 NBA draft, where the Toronto Raptors selected him in the first round with the ninth overall pick. He was traded to the San Antonio Spurs in July 2018. After five seasons with the team he was traded back to the Raptors in February 2023.

== Early life ==
Pöltl was born in Vienna, Austria. Both his parents were members of the Austrian national volleyball teams. His parents opted for basketball for their son because there was a youth basketball program near their Vienna home during his childhood. Pöltl played seven years in the youth program of Vienna DC Timberwolves. He played one year for the Arkadia Traiskirchen Lions of the Austrian Bundesliga in 2013–14.

== College recruitment ==
Pöltl was relatively unknown in the United States until the 2013 FIBA Europe Under-18 Championship. University of Utah assistant Andy Hill went to the tournament, held in Strumica, largely to scout potential prospects from other teams; he only saw Austria's opening game against the Netherlands because he vowed to watch all 38 teams in person. After seeing Pöltl's 15-rebound performance, Hill began sounding Pöltl out for potential interest in playing college basketball in the United States. Pöltl went on to average a double-double in points and rebounds during the tournament and was named to the second all-tournament team, despite Austria going 1–6 and finishing 20th out of 22 teams in the second-level Division B.

Pöltl began drawing interest from several NCAA Division I programs, forcing him to decide between a professional career and a U.S. college education. In a 2014 interview, Pöltl revealed part of his decision-making process:

If I went pro in Europe, I probably wouldn't have a chance to go to a university and get my degree. ... I could have basketball and an education at the same time [in the U.S.]. Also I think I wasn't ready for 100 percent professional basketball at that time.

In 2014, Pöltl committed to Utah to play college basketball, in large part due to the relationship he had developed with their coaching staff. Utah head coach Larry Krystkowiak was one of three Division I head coaches and two assistant coaches to travel to Vienna to recruit him in person, and made the trip of over 5,000 miles (8,000 km) twice. Pöltl was impressed that Krystkowiak made the effort to visit him in person, and was intrigued that the 6-foot-10-inch (2.08 m) coach played power forward in the NBA and had a history of developing young big men.

== College career ==
Pöltl became a starter in his first year, and in his first game he scored 18 points and had 10 rebounds. During his second season in 2015–16, he was named to the 35-man midseason watchlist for the Naismith Trophy on February 11. On March 7, 2016, Pöltl was named the Pac-12 Player of the Year and All-Pac-12 First Team. He was subsequently named the winner of both the Pete Newell Big Man Award and the Kareem Abdul-Jabbar Award.

On April 13, 2016, Pöltl declared for the NBA draft, forgoing his final two years of college eligibility.

== Professional career ==
=== Toronto Raptors (2016–2018) ===
On June 23, 2016, Pöltl was selected by the Toronto Raptors with the ninth overall pick in the 2016 NBA draft, becoming the first Austrian to be drafted to the NBA. On July 9, 2016, he signed his rookie scale contract with the Raptors. He made his debut for the Raptors in their season opener on October 26, 2016, becoming the first Austrian to play in the NBA. He finished with two points in 12:47 of court time in a 109–91 win over the Detroit Pistons. During his rookie season, Pöltl received multiple assignments to Raptors 905, Toronto's G-League affiliate.

On October 21, 2017, Pöltl scored a then career-high 14 points in a 128–94 win over the Philadelphia 76ers. On December 1, he made all eight of his field goal attempts and had a career-high 18 points in a 120–115 win over the Indiana Pacers. Pöltl ended the 2017–18 regular season having made 34 of his last 39 shots in the final eight games. He was also the only Raptors player to appear in all 82 regular-season contests.

=== San Antonio Spurs (2018–2023) ===
On July 18, 2018, Pöltl was traded, along with DeMar DeRozan and a protected 2019 first-round draft pick, to the San Antonio Spurs in exchange for Kawhi Leonard and Danny Green. In his debut for the Spurs in their season opener on October 17, 2018, Pöltl recorded four points, four rebounds and two assists in eight minutes in a 112–108 win over the Minnesota Timberwolves. He made just his fifth career start and first since February 14, 2017, with Toronto. On February 25, 2022, Pöltl posted a career high 28 points along with 11 rebounds, 8 assists, and 2 blocks in a 157–153 win against the Washington Wizards. On November 24, 2020, the San Antonio Spurs announced that they had re-signed Pöltl to a three-year, $26.25 million contract.

On March 17, 2021, Pöltl logged his second consecutive double-double with 20 points and a career-high 16 rebounds in a 106–99 win over the Chicago Bulls.

On November 22, 2022, Pöltl scored a career-high 31 points during a 117–110 loss to the Portland Trail Blazers.

=== Second stint with Toronto (2023–present) ===
On February 9, 2023, Pöltl was traded back to the Toronto Raptors in exchange for Khem Birch, a 2024 first-round pick, a 2023 second-round pick and a 2025 second-round pick, reuniting with his longtime friend and fellow draftee Pascal Siakam. On February 14, Pöltl scored 30 points, grabbed nine rebounds, and blocked six shots during a 133–123 win over the Orlando Magic. On July 6, 2023, Pöltl re-signed with the Raptors on a four-year, $78 million deal.

On November 16, 2024, Pöltl scored a career-high 35 points on 16-of-19 shooting in a 126–123 loss to the Boston Celtics.

On July 7, 2025, Pöltl signed a 4-year, $104 million extension through the 2029–30 season.

== Career statistics ==
Legend
GP	Games played	GS	Games started	MPG	Minutes per game
FG%	Field goal percentage	3P%	3-point field goal percentage	FT%	Free throw percentage
RPG	Rebounds per game	APG	Assists per game	SPG	Steals per game
BPG	Blocks per game	PPG	Points per game	**Bold**	Career high
*	Led the league

=== NBA ===
==== Regular season ====
Year	Team	GP	GS	MPG	FG%	3P%	FT%	RPG	APG	SPG	BPG	PPG
2016–17	Toronto	54	4	11.6	.583	—	.544	3.1	.2	.3	.4	3.1
2017–18	Toronto	**82***	0	18.6	.659	.500	.594	4.8	.7	.5	1.2	6.9
2018–19	San Antonio	77	24	16.5	.645	—	.533	5.3	1.2	.4	.9	5.5
2019–20	San Antonio	66	18	17.7	.624	—	.465	5.7	1.8	.6	1.4	5.6
2020–21	San Antonio	69	51	26.7	.616	—	.508	7.9	1.9	.7	**1.8**	8.6
2021–22	San Antonio	68	**67**	29.0	.618	**1.000**	.495	9.3	2.8	.7	1.7	13.5
2022–23	San Antonio	46	46	26.1	.616	.000	.605	9.0	**3.1**	.8	1.1	12.1
2022–23	Toronto	26	25	27.2	.652	—	.569	9.1	2.2	**1.2**	1.3	13.1
2023–24	Toronto	50	50	26.4	.656	—	.551	8.6	2.5	.7	1.5	11.1
2024–25	Toronto	57	56	**29.6**	.627	.333	**.674**	**9.6**	2.8	**1.2**	1.2	**14.5**
2025–26	Toronto	46	44	25.0	**.700**	—	.602	7.0	2.0	.9	.7	10.7
Career		641	385	22.6	.636	.429	.559	7.0	1.8	.7	1.2	9.1

==== Playoffs ====
Year	Team	GP	GS	MPG	FG%	3P%	FT%	RPG	APG	SPG	BPG	PPG
2017	Toronto	6	0	4.3	.455	—	.000	2.0	.0	.2	.2	1.7
2018	Toronto	**9**	0	15.6	.548	.000	**.789**	4.0	.7	.3	.4	5.4
2019	San Antonio	7	**7**	**25.3**	.638	.000	.556	**7.7**	**1.7**	.3	.7	**7.3**
2026	Toronto	7	**7**	19.1	**.645**	—	.643	6.0	1.4	**.9**	**.9**	7.0
Career		29	14	16.4	.596	.000	.659	5.0	1.0	.4	.6	5.5

=== College ===
Year	Team	GP	GS	MPG	FG%	3P%	FT%	RPG	APG	SPG	BPG	PPG
2014–15	Utah	34	34	23.3	**.681**	.000	.444	6.8	.7	.4	**1.9**	9.1
2015–16	Utah	**36**	**36**	**30.4**	.646	—	**.689**	**9.1**	**1.9**	**.6**	1.6	**17.2**
Career		70	70	26.9	.658	.000	.605	8.0	1.3	.5	1.7	13.3

== References in popular culture ==
On February 25, 2022, a game similar to the word guessing game Wordle titled Poeltl was released. In the game, which is named after Pöltl, players try to guess a daily NBA Player based on their silhouette in a maximum of eight tries.

== See also ==
- List of European basketball players in the United States
- List of NBA career field goal percentage leaders
