= Gradey Dick =

American basketball player (born 2003)

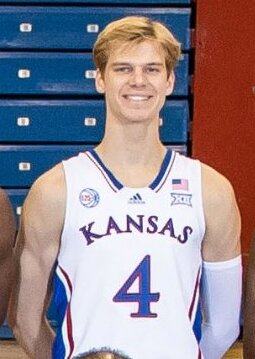
- Dick with the Kansas Jayhawks in 2022

No. 9 – Los Angeles Clippers
- Position: Shooting guard / small forward
- League: NBA

Personal information
- Born: November 20, 2003 (age 23) Wichita, Kansas, U.S.
- Listed height: 6 ft 7 in (2.01 m)
- Listed weight: 200 lb (91 kg)

Career information
- High school: Wichita Collegiate (Wichita, Kansas); Sunrise Christian Academy (Bel Aire, Kansas)
- College: Kansas (2022–2023)
- NBA draft: 2023: 1st round, 13th overall pick
- Drafted by: Toronto Raptors
- Playing career: 2023–present

Career history
- 2023–2026: Toronto Raptors
- 2023–2024: →Raptors 905
- 2026–present: Los Angeles Clippers

Career highlights
- Second-team All-Big 12 (2023); Big 12 All-Newcomer Team (2023); Big 12 All-Freshman Team (2023); Gatorade National Player of the Year (2022); McDonald's All-American (2022); Nike Hoop Summit (2022)
- Stats at NBA.com
- Stats at Basketball Reference
Medals
Men's 3x3 basketball
Representing the United States
FIBA 3x3 Under-18 World Cup
Gold medal – first place	2021 Hungary	Team

Gradey Reed Dick (born November 20, 2003) is an American professional basketball player for the Los Angeles Clippers of the National Basketball Association (NBA). He played college basketball for the Kansas Jayhawks, and was selected by the Raptors with the 13th overall selection in the 2023 NBA draft. Dick was awarded the 2022 Gatorade National Player of the Year in high school.

== High school career ==
Dick started high school at Wichita Collegiate School in Wichita, Kansas, where he spent two years. In his final year with the school, he averaged 20 points a game while reaching the state playoffs. He subsequently transferred to Sunrise Christian Academy. He played two years for the school, averaging 18 points a game in his senior year.

He was named to the rosters for the McDonald's All-American Game and Nike Hoop Summit. On March 22, 2022, Dick was named the Gatorade National Player of the Year.

=== Recruiting ===
Dick received basketball scholarship offers from Kansas, Iowa State and Baylor, among others, during his first two years of high school. He emerged as a five-star recruit during his tenure with Sunrise Christian Academy. On March 3, 2021, he committed to playing college basketball for Kansas over offers from Florida and Illinois.

College recruiting
Name	Hometown	School	Height	Weight	Commit date
Gradey Dick; SF	Wichita, KS	Sunrise Christian Academy (KS)	6 ft 7 in (2.01 m)	195 lb (88 kg)	Mar 3, 2021
Gradey Dick; SF	Recruit ratings: Rivals: 247Sports: ESPN: (92)				
Overall recruit ranking: Rivals: 28 247Sports: 21 ESPN: 14
Note: In many cases, Scout, Rivals, 247Sports, On3, and ESPN may conflict in their listings of height and weight.; In these cases, the average was taken. ESPN grades are on a 100-point scale.; Sources: "Kansas 2022 Basketball Commitments". Rivals.; "2022 Kansas Jayhawks Recruiting Class". ESPN.; "2022 Team Ranking". Rivals.

== College career ==
In his college debut, Dick tallied 23 points, two rebounds, two steals and an assist in an 89–64 victory over Omaha. He was named to the Second Team All-Big 12 as well as the All-Newcomer and All-Freshman teams. During the 2023 NCAA tournament, he performed well, recording 19 points, 11 rebounds, five assists and three steals against Howard. As a freshman, he averaged 14.1 points, 5.1 rebounds and 1.7 assists per game. On March 31, 2023, Dick declared for the 2023 NBA draft.

== Professional career ==
=== Toronto Raptors (2023–2026) ===
The Toronto Raptors selected Dick with the thirteenth overall pick in the 2023 NBA draft. He made his 2023 NBA Summer League debut on July 7 against the Chicago Bulls with ten points, four rebounds and two assists in a 83–74 loss. On July 15, 2023, Dick recorded 21 points, 5 rebounds and 2 steals to help the Toronto Raptors win 108–101 against the Golden State Warriors in his fifth Summer League game.

On November 23, 2023, the Raptors assigned Dick to the Raptors 905 of the NBA G League. In his first game against Capital City Go-Go, Dick shot 1 for 12, missing all six three-pointers, and had three turnovers in a 115–101 loss. Dick bounced back on December 1, 2023, with a strong winning performance against the Maine Celtics. He shot 7 for 14 and made 4-of-7 three-pointers in a strong 21-point performance. It was the Raptors 905's first win of the season.

On March 27, 2024, during a 145–101 blowout loss against the New York Knicks, Dick scored a then-career-high 23 points. On April 10, 2024, during a 106–102 loss against the Brooklyn Nets, Dick scored a then-career-high 24 points.

On October 26, 2024, during a 112–101 loss against the Minnesota Timberwolves, Dick scored a then-career-high 25 points. On October 30, Dick scored a then-career-high 30 points in a 138–133 loss to the Charlotte Hornets. On November 1, Dick scored a then-career-high 31 points in a 131–125 loss to the Los Angeles Lakers. On November 12, Dick scored a career-high 32 points against the Milwaukee Bucks. He started 54 games for Toronto during the 2024–25 NBA season, averaging 14.4 points, 3.6 rebounds, and 1.8 assists. On April 4, 2025, Dick was ruled out for the remainder of the season due to a lingering right knee injury.

=== Los Angeles Clippers (2026–present) ===
On June 30, ESPN reported that the Raptors and Clippers have agreed to a potential trade. The Raptors organization indicated on July 9, that it planned to wait for the conclusion of the salary cap investigation involving Leonard and the Clippers before proceeding. On September 2, the NBA concluded its investigation, and levied multiple penalties, including a $700,000 fine for Leonard. On September 14, Dick was traded to the Los Angeles Clippers alongside Brandon Ingram, and five draft picks in exchange for Kawhi Leonard.

== National team career ==
Dick represented the United States at the 2021 FIBA 3x3 Under-18 World Cup in Debrecen, Hungary. His teammates were Kyle Filipowski, Keyonte George and Eric Dailey Jr. Dick averaged 3.2 points, helping his team win the gold medal.

== Career statistics ==
Legend
GP	Games played	GS	Games started	MPG	Minutes per game
FG%	Field goal percentage	3P%	3-point field goal percentage	FT%	Free throw percentage
RPG	Rebounds per game	APG	Assists per game	SPG	Steals per game
BPG	Blocks per game	PPG	Points per game	**Bold**	Career high

=== NBA ===
==== Regular season ====
Year	Team	GP	GS	MPG	FG%	3P%	FT%	RPG	APG	SPG	BPG	PPG
2023–24	Toronto	60	17	21.1	**.425**	**.365**	.863	2.2	1.1	.6	.0	8.5
2024–25	Toronto	54	**54**	**29.4**	.410	.350	.858	**3.6**	**1.8**	**.9**	**.2**	**14.4**
2025–26	Toronto	**76**	1	14.0	.419	.301	**.875**	1.9	.7	.6	.1	6.0
Career		190	72	20.6	.417	.343	.864	2.5	1.1	.7	.1	9.2

==== Playoffs ====
Year	Team	GP	GS	MPG	FG%	3P%	FT%	RPG	APG	SPG	BPG	PPG
2026	Toronto	3	0	1.3	–	–	–	.3	.0	.0	.0	.0
Career		3	0	1.3	–	–	–	.3	.0	.0	.0	.0

=== College ===
Year	Team	GP	GS	MPG	FG%	3P%	FT%	RPG	APG	SPG	BPG	PPG
2022–23	Kansas	36	36	32.7	.442	.403	.854	5.1	1.7	1.4	.3	14.1

== Personal life ==
Dick was born in Wichita, Kansas, to Bart and Carmen Dick. His mother played college basketball for Iowa State. He is a Christian and has said, "I was given, fortunately, all these blessings in my life, and that's kind of my hand, and I'm trying to do the best I can do with it and glorify God while I'm doing it."

On July 17, 2023, Dick signed a multi-year deal with Adidas. He has also starred in commercials for Gillette. He also has a podcast called Welcome Party on Bleacher Report.
