= Collin Murray-Boyles =

American basketball player (born 2005)

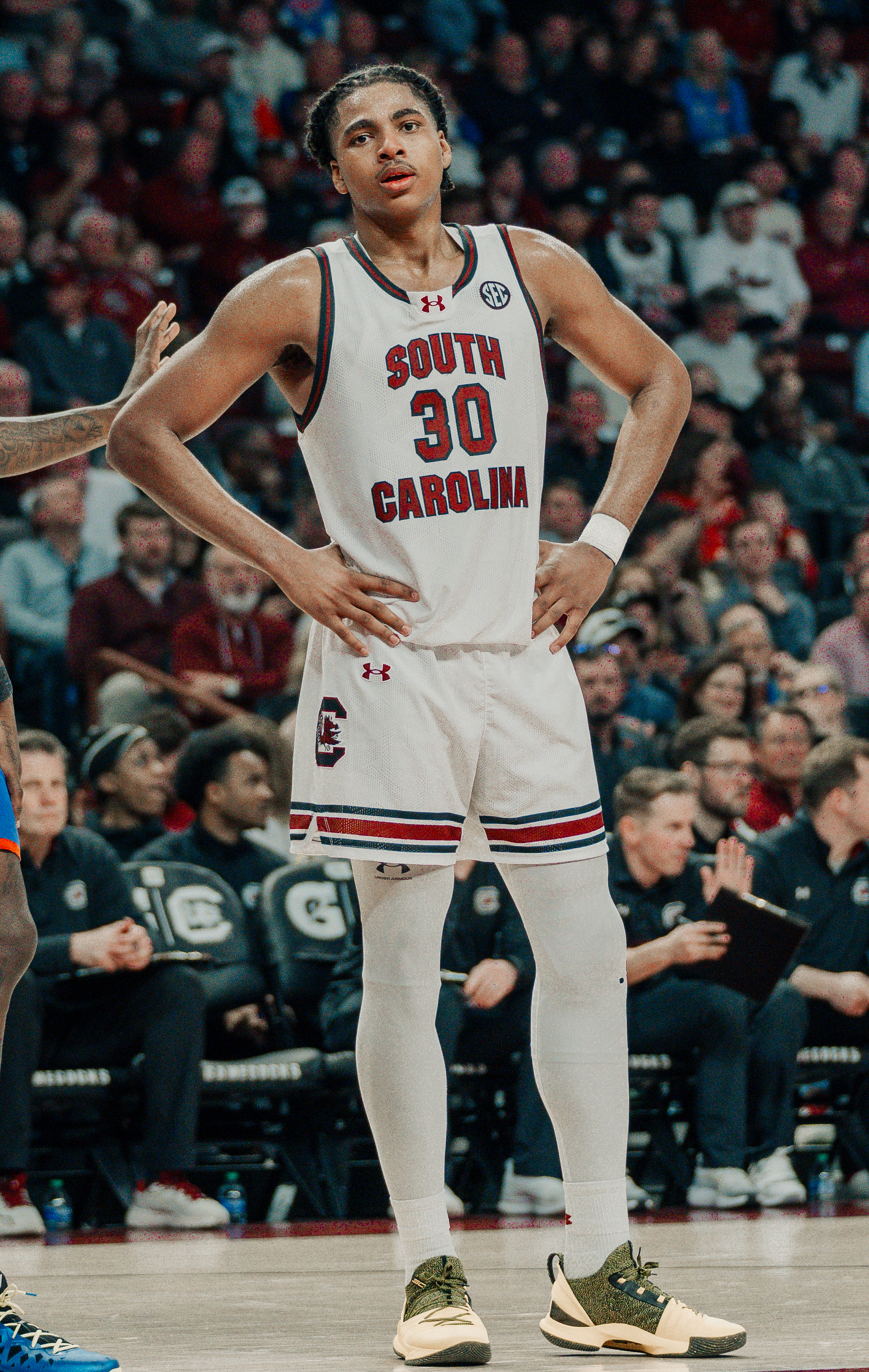
- Murray-Boyles with South Carolina in 2024

No. 30 – Toronto Raptors
- Position: Power forward
- League: NBA

Personal information
- Born: June 10, 2005 (age 21) Columbia, South Carolina, U.S.
- Listed height: 6 ft 7 in (2.01 m)
- Listed weight: 245 lb (111 kg)

Career information
- High school: A. C. Flora (Forest Acres, South Carolina); Wasatch Academy (Mount Pleasant, Utah)
- College: South Carolina (2023–2025)
- NBA draft: 2025: 1st round, 9th overall pick
- Drafted by: Toronto Raptors
- Playing career: 2025–present

Career history
- 2025–present: Toronto Raptors

Career highlights
- NBA All-Rookie Second Team (2026); Second-team All-SEC (2025); SEC All-Freshman Team (2024)
- Stats at NBA.com
- Stats at Basketball Reference

Collin Joseph Murray-Boyles (born June 10, 2005) is an American professional basketball player for the Toronto Raptors of the National Basketball Association (NBA). He played college basketball for the South Carolina Gamecocks.

== Early life and high school career ==
Murray-Boyles was born on June 10, 2005 and hails from Columbia, South Carolina. He attended A.C. Flora High School in Forest Acres, South Carolina, where he was named the Class 4A Player of the Year as a junior after helping Flora reach the state championship while averaging 34.3 points, 11.4 rebounds and 5.3 blocks. He transferred to Wasatch Academy in Mount Pleasant, Utah , for his senior season, and posted a team-leading average of 15 points and 8.8 rebounds per game; he was first in the conference in rebounds and third in points scored.

=== Recruiting ===
Murray-Boyles was a consensus four-star recruit and a top-100 player nationally following his performance at Wasatch. On August 7, 2022, he committed to playing college basketball for South Carolina.

College recruiting
Name	Hometown	School	Height	Weight	Commit date
Collin Murray-Boyles; PF	Columbia, SC	Wasatch Academy (UT)	6 ft 7 in (2.01 m)	220 lb (100 kg)	Aug 7, 2022
Collin Murray-Boyles; PF	Recruit ratings: Rivals: 247Sports: On3: ESPN: (84)				
Overall recruit ranking: Rivals: 126 247Sports: 108 On3: 116 ESPN: 64
Note: In many cases, Scout, Rivals, 247Sports, On3, and ESPN may conflict in their listings of height and weight.; In these cases, the average was taken. ESPN grades are on a 100-point scale.; Sources: "South Carolina 2023 Basketball Commitments". Rivals.; "2023 South Carolina Recruiting Class". ESPN.; "2023 Team Ranking". Rivals.

== College career ==
Prior to the 2023–24 season at South Carolina, Murray-Boyles contracted infectious mononucleosis, resulting in him missing significant time. He became a top player upon returning, including being named the Southeastern Conference (SEC) Freshman of the Week in February after performances that included a 31-point game over Vanderbilt. At the conclusion of the regular season, Murray-Boyles was named to the SEC All-Freshman Team.

Following the conclusion of his sophomore season, he declared for the 2025 NBA draft and received a green room invite in the second wave.

== Professional career ==
Murray-Boyles was chosen ninth overall in the 2025 NBA draft by the Toronto Raptors. On July 1, 2025, Murray-Boyles signed a rookie-scale contract with the Raptors. On January 11, 2026, Murray-Boyles recorded 17 points, 15 rebounds, 3 blocks and 3 steals, propelling Toronto to a 116-115 overtime victory over the Philadelphia 76ers, becoming the first player in Raptors history to achieve those numbers in a game. On April 23, 2026, Murray-Boyles posted a playoff career high 22 points, along with 8 rebounds, in a 126-104 victory over the Cleveland Cavaliers.

== Career statistics ==
Legend
GP	Games played	GS	Games started	MPG	Minutes per game
FG%	Field goal percentage	3P%	3-point field goal percentage	FT%	Free throw percentage
RPG	Rebounds per game	APG	Assists per game	SPG	Steals per game
BPG	Blocks per game	PPG	Points per game	**Bold**	Career high

=== NBA ===
==== Regular season ====
Year	Team	GP	GS	MPG	FG%	3P%	FT%	RPG	APG	SPG	BPG	PPG
2025–26	Toronto	57	22	21.9	.579	.340	.657	5.0	1.9	.9	.9	8.5
Career		57	22	21.9	.579	.340	.657	5.0	1.9	.9	.9	8.5

==== Playoffs ====
Year	Team	GP	GS	MPG	FG%	3P%	FT%	RPG	APG	SPG	BPG	PPG
2026	Toronto	7	0	27.3	.656	.000	.773	6.4	2.4	1.3	1.1	14.4
Career		7	0	27.3	.656	.000	.773	6.4	2.4	1.3	1.1	14.4

=== College ===
Year	Team	GP	GS	MPG	FG%	3P%	FT%	RPG	APG	SPG	BPG	PPG
2023–24	South Carolina	28	19	22.8	**.597**	.000	.667	5.7	1.8	1.0	1.0	10.4
2024–25	South Carolina	**32**	**32**	**30.6**	.586	**.265**	**.707**	**8.3**	**2.4**	**1.5**	**1.3**	**16.8**
Career		60	51	27.0	.590	.231	.695	7.1	2.1	1.3	1.2	13.8
