= Ja'Kobe Walter =

American basketball player (born 2004)

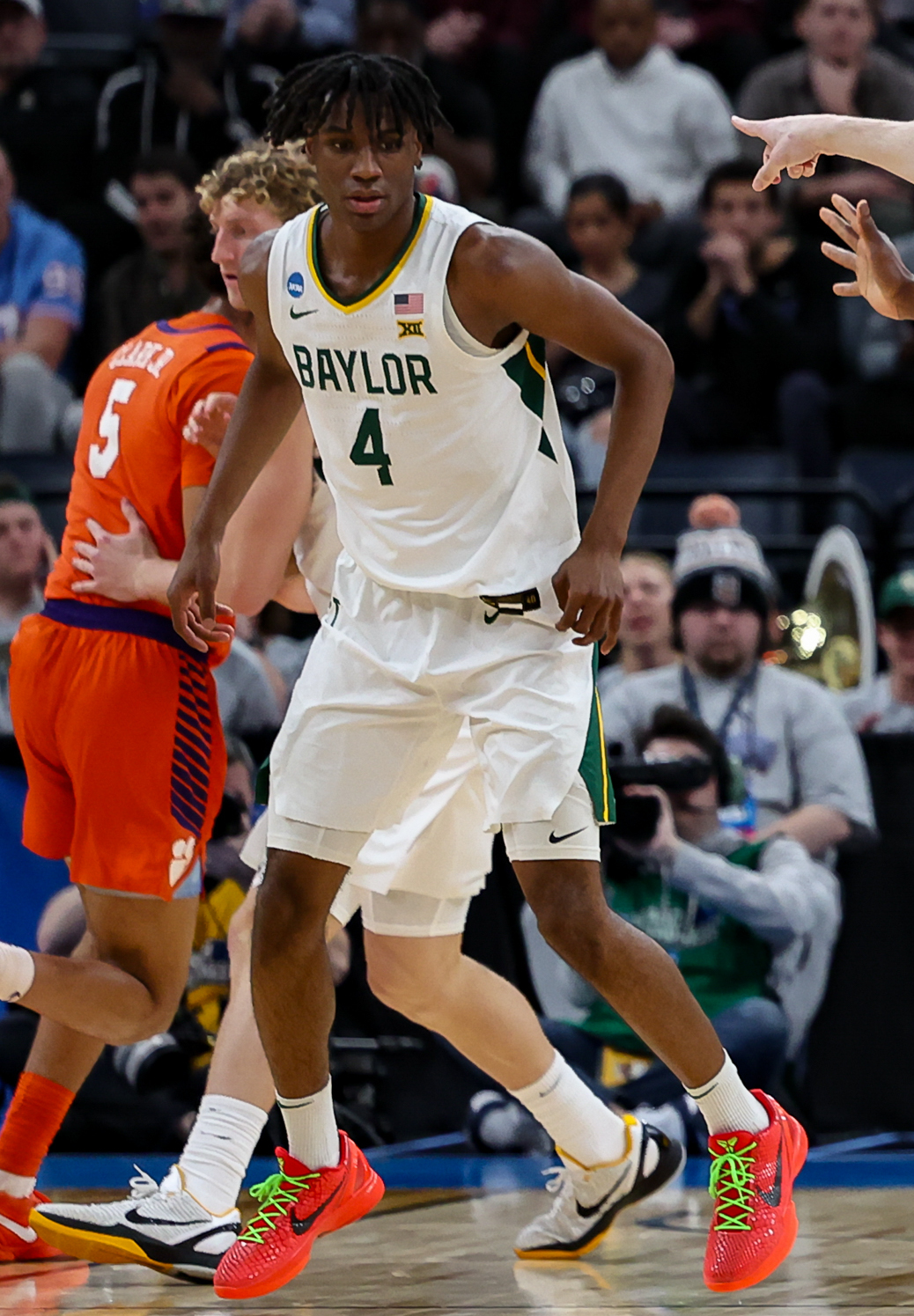
- Walter with Baylor in 2024

No. 14 – Toronto Raptors
- Position: Shooting guard
- League: NBA

Personal information
- Born: September 4, 2004 (age 22) Dallas, Texas, U.S
- Listed height: 6 ft 5 in (1.96 m)
- Listed weight: 180 lb (82 kg)

Career information
- High school: McKinney (McKinney, Texas); Link Academy (Branson, Missouri)
- College: Baylor (2023–2024)
- NBA draft: 2024: 1st round, 19th overall pick
- Drafted by: Toronto Raptors
- Playing career: 2024–present

Career history
- 2024–present: Toronto Raptors
- 2024–2025: →Raptors 905

Career highlights
- Third-team All-Big 12 (2024); Big 12 Freshman of the Year (2024); Big 12 All-Freshman team (2024); McDonald's All-American (2023); Jordan Brand Classic (2023); Nike Hoop Summit (2023)
- Stats at NBA.com
- Stats at Basketball Reference

Ja'Kobe Amare Walter (born September 4, 2004) is an American professional basketball player for the Toronto Raptors of the National Basketball Association (NBA). He played college basketball for the Baylor Bears. He was a consensus five-star recruit and one of the top players in the 2023 class.

== Early life and high school career ==
Walter grew up in McKinney, Texas and initially attended McKinney High School. A shooting guard, he averaged 23.3 points, 7.6 rebounds, 1.9 assists, and 2.3 steals per game as a junior leading McKinney to a state championship. Walter transferred to Link Academy in Branson, Missouri prior to the start of his senior year. Walter was selected to play in the 2023 McDonald's All-American Boys Game during his senior year. He was also selected to play for Team USA in the Nike Hoops Summit.

=== Recruiting ===
Walter was a consensus five-star recruit and one of the top players in the 2023 class, according to major recruiting services. On June 22, 2022, he committed to playing college basketball for Baylor over offers from Texas, Auburn and Alabama.

College recruiting
Name	Hometown	School	Height	Weight	Commit date
Ja'Kobe Walter; SG	McKinney, TX	Link Academy (MO)	6 ft 5 in (1.96 m)	185 lb (84 kg)	Jun 22, 2022
Ja'Kobe Walter; SG	Recruit ratings: Rivals: 247Sports: ESPN: (93)				
Overall recruit ranking: Rivals: 13 247Sports: 8 ESPN: 8
Note: In many cases, Scout, Rivals, 247Sports, On3, and ESPN may conflict in their listings of height and weight.; In these cases, the average was taken. ESPN grades are on a 100-point scale.; Sources: "Baylor 2023 Basketball Commitments". Rivals.; "2023 Baylor Bears Recruiting Class". ESPN.; "2023 Team Ranking". Rivals.

== College career ==
Walter enrolled at Baylor University in June 2023 to take part in summer practices. In his college debut against Auburn, Walter set the Baylor school record for points in a debut by a freshman, netting 28 on the night. He averaged 14.5 points, 4.4 rebounds, and 1.4 assists per game. Walter was named Big 12 Freshman of the Year.

== Professional career ==
On June 26, 2024, Walter was selected with the 19th overall pick by the Toronto Raptors in the 2024 NBA draft and on July 4, he signed with the team. However, he missed the beginning of the season, including training camp, because of an AC joint sprain. Throughout his rookie season, he has been assigned several times to Raptors 905.

On November 1, 2024, Walter made his NBA debut and on November 27, he made his first NBA start in his career while achieving his first double-double with 11 rebounds, 14 points and 5 assists in a 119–93 road win against the New Orleans Pelicans. On December 22, he scored a career high of 27 points in a 114-110 home loss against the Houston Rockets.

On March 4, 2025, in a 114-113 win against the Orlando Magic, Walter had 3 rebounds and scored 17 points, including the game-winning three with 0.5 remaining on the clock in the 4th quarter. This propelled the Raptors to victory on the road at the Kia Center.

On May 1, 2026, Walter posted a playoff career high 24 points, along with 5 rebounds and 3 steals, in a 112-110 overtime win against the Cleveland Cavaliers.

== Career statistics ==
Legend
GP	Games played	GS	Games started	MPG	Minutes per game
FG%	Field goal percentage	3P%	3-point field goal percentage	FT%	Free throw percentage
RPG	Rebounds per game	APG	Assists per game	SPG	Steals per game
BPG	Blocks per game	PPG	Points per game	**Bold**	Career high

=== NBA ===
==== Regular season ====
Year	Team	GP	GS	MPG	FG%	3P%	FT%	RPG	APG	SPG	BPG	PPG
2024–25	Toronto	52	18	**21.2**	.405	.349	**.795**	**3.1**	**1.6**	.8	**.2**	**8.6**
2025–26	Toronto	**72**	**19**	20.5	**.446**	**.409**	.789	2.6	1.2	**1.0**	**.2**	7.5
Career		124	37	20.8	.425	.385	.792	2.8	1.3	.9	.2	8.0

==== Playoffs ====
Year	Team	GP	GS	MPG	FG%	3P%	FT%	RPG	APG	SPG	BPG	PPG
2026	Toronto	7	5	32.0	.373	.327	.917	3.1	1.4	2.0	.3	11.1
Career		7	5	32.0	.373	.327	.917	3.1	1.4	2.0	.3	11.1

=== College ===
Year	Team	GP	GS	MPG	FG%	3P%	FT%	RPG	APG	SPG	BPG	PPG
2023–24	Baylor	35	35	32.3	.376	.341	.792	4.4	1.4	1.1	.2	14.5

== Personal life ==
Walter was born and raised in McKinney, Texas, where he has deep family roots. Walter's father, Eddie Walter, played college basketball for Birmingham–Southern College from 1994 to 1996. His parents named him after basketball legends Kobe Bryant and Michael Jordan. Walter is a Christian and has said that his faith "allowed him to stay humble and use his gifts to serve others".
