= Minnesota Timberwolves all-time roster =

The following is a list of players, both past and current, who appeared on the roster for the Minnesota Timberwolves NBA franchise.

== Players ==
Note: Statistics are correct through the end of the 2025–26 season.

G	Guard	G/F	Guard-forward	F	Forward	F/C	Forward-center	C	Center

legend
^	Denotes player who has been inducted to the Naismith Memorial Basketball Hall of Fame
*	Denotes player who has been selected for at least one All-Star Game with the Minnesota Timberwolves and is currently on the team roster
^{+}	Denotes player who has been selected for at least one All-Star Game with the Minnesota Timberwolves
^{x}	Denotes player who is currently on the Minnesota Timberwolves roster
0.0	Denotes the Minnesota Timberwolves statistics leader (min. 100 games played for the team for per-game statistics)

=== A to B ===
All-time roster
Player	Pos.	Pre-draft team	Yrs	Seasons	Statistics									Ref.
Player	Pos.	Pre-draft team	Yrs	Seasons	GP	MP	REB	AST	PTS	MPG	RPG	APG	PPG	Ref.
Jeff Adrien	F	UConn	1	2014–2015	17	215	77	15	60	12.6	4.5	0.9	3.5	
Maurice Ager	G	Michigan State	1	2010–2011	4	29	2	1	4	7.3	0.5	0.3	3.8	
Cole Aldrich	C	Kansas	2	2016–2018	83	580	73	28	117	7.0	2.1	0.3	1.4	
Nickeil Alexander-Walker	G	Virginia Tech	3	2022–2025	187	4,350	474	459	1,563	23.3	2.5	2.5	8.4	
Jerome Allen	G	Pennsylviania	1	1995–1996	41	362	25	49	108	8.8	0.6	1.2	2.6	
Lou Amundson	C	UNLV	1	2012–2013	20	161	47	3	32	8.1	2.4	0.2	1.6	
Kyle Anderson^{x}	F	UCLA	3	2022–2024; 2025–2026	167	4,102	711	728	1,240	24.6	4.3	4.4	7.4	
William Avery	G	Duke	3	1999–2002	142	1,205	93	199	379	8.5	0.7	1.4	2.7	
Thurl Bailey	F/C	NC State	3	1991–1994	220	4,350	837	174	1,934	19.8	3.8	0.8	8.8	
Marcus Banks	G	UNLV	1	2005–2006	40	1,228	116	188	479	30.7	2.9	4.7	12.0	
José Juan Barea	G	Northeastern	3	2011–2014	194	4,216	475	829	1,957	21.7	2.4	4.3	10.1	
Keita Bates-Diop	F	Ohio State	2	2018–2020	67	1,149	193	47	402	17.1	2.9	0.7	6.0	
Jerryd Bayless	G	Arizona	1	2018–2019	34	657	62	119	209	19.3	1.8	3.5	6.1	
Malik Beasley	G	Florida State	3	2020–2023	130	3,653	460	231	1,967	28.1	3.5	1.8	15.1	
Michael Beasley	F	Kansas State	2	2010–2012	120	3,448	616	203	1,942	28.7	5.1	1.7	16.2	
Jordan Bell	F	Oregon	1	2019–2020	27	235	78	14	83	8.7	2.9	0.5	3.1	
Anthony Bennett	F	UNLV	1	2014–2015	57	894	216	48	298	15.7	3.8	0.8	5.2	
Joan Beringer^{x}	C	(Slovenia) KK Cedevita Olimpija	1	2025–2026	40	314	92	12	156	7.9	2.3	0.3	3.9	
Patrick Beverley	G	Arkansas	1	2021–2022	58	1,476	240	268	533	25.4	4.1	4.6	9.2	
Chauncey Billups^	G	Colorado	2	2000–2002	159	4,145	384	710	1,740	26.1	2.4	4.5	10.9	
Nemanja Bjelica	F	(Serbia) Fenerbahce Ulker	3	2015–2018	192	3,636	728	248	1,165	18.9	3.8	1.3	6.1	
Lance Blanks	G	Texas	1	1992–1993	61	642	68	72	161	10.5	1.1	1.2	2.6	
Mark Blount	C	Pittsburgh	2	2005–2007	124	3,701	708	100	1,439	29.8	5.7	0.8	11.6	
Leandro Bolmaro	G	(Argentina) Barcelona	1	2021–2022	35	241	43	21	50	6.9	1.2	0.6	1.4	
Calvin Booth	C	Penn State	1	2008–2009	1	1	1	0	0	1.0	1.0	0.0	0.0	
Marques Bragg	F	Providence	1	1995–1996	53	369	79	8	131	7.0	1.5	0.2	2.5	
Adrian Branch	G/F	Maryland	1	1989–1990	11	91	20	4	65	8.3	1.8	0.4	5.9	
Terrell Brandon	G	Oregon	4	1998–2002	202	7,082	710	1,681	3,157	35.1	3.5	8.3	15.6	
Randy Breuer	C	Minnesota	3	1989–1992	191	4,006	916	246	1,310	21.0	4.8	1.3	6.9	
Corey Brewer	F	Florida	6	2007–2011; 2013–2015	337	9,243	1,073	619	3,350	27.4	3.2	1.8	9.9	
Aaron Brooks	G	Oregon	1	2017–2018	32	189	17	20	75	5.9	0.5	0.6	2.3	
Scott Brooks	G	UC Irvine	2	1990–1992	162	2,062	171	409	841	12.7	1.1	2.5	5.2	
Anthony Brown	F	Stanford	1	2017–2018	1	4	0	1	3	4.0	0.0	1.0	3.0	
Bobby Brown	G	Cal State, Fullerton	1	2008–2009	21	256	16	30	116	12.2	0.8	1.4	5.5	
Lorenzo Brown	G	NC State	1	2014–2015	29	549	70	90	122	18.9	2.4	3.1	4.2	
Mike Brown	F/C	George Washington	2	1993–1995	109	2,134	492	82	334	19.6	4.5	0.8	3.1	
Myron Brown	G	Slippery Rock University	1	1991–1992	4	23	3	6	9	5.8	0.8	1.5	2.3	
Troy Brown Jr.	G/F	Oregon	1	2023–2024	37	410	72	35	154	11.1	1.9	0.9	4.2	
Greg Buckner	G	Clemson	1	2007–2008	31	520	65	39	124	16.8	2.1	1.3	4.0	
Chase Budinger	F	Arizona	3	2012–2015	131	2,545	372	120	947	19.4	2.8	0.9	7.2	
Jimmy Butler^{+}	G/F	Marquette	2	2017–2019	69	2,525	366	331	1,520	36.6	5.3	4.8	22.0	

=== C to D ===
All-time roster
Player	Pos.	Pre-draft team	Yrs	Seasons	Statistics									Ref.
Player	Pos.	Pre-draft team	Yrs	Seasons	GP	MP	REB	AST	PTS	MPG	RPG	APG	PPG	Ref.
Tony Campbell	F	Ohio State	3	1989–1992	237	8,498	1,098	656	4,888	35.9	4.6	2.8	20.6	
Isaiah Canaan	G	Murray State	1	2018–2019	7	95	5	19	33	13.6	0.7	2.7	4.7	
Brian Cardinal	F	Purdue	2	2008–2010	93	1,176	171	100	238	12.6	1.8	1.1	2.6	
Rodney Carney	F	Memphis	1	2008–2009	67	1,199	126	26	481	17.9	1.9	0.4	7.2	
Chris Carr	G	Southern Illinois	3	1996–1999	117	2,076	280	140	864	17.7	2.4	1.2	7.4	
Anthony Carter	G	Hawaii	2	2004–2006	111	1,331	131	262	331	12.0	1.2	2.4	3.0	
Sam Cassell^{+}	G	Florida State	2	2003–2005	140	4,360	428	893	2,402	31.1	3.1	6.4	17.2	
Omri Casspi	F	(Israel) Maccabi Tel Aviv	1	2016–2017	13	222	20	11	45	17.1	1.5	0.8	3.5	
Jaylen Clark^{x}	G	UCLA	2	2024–2026	108	1,410	173	69	438	13.1	1.6	0.6	4.1	
Richard Coffey	F	Minnesota	1	1990–1991	52	320	79	3	68	6.2	1.5	0.1	1.3	
Jason Collins	C	Stanford	1	2008–2009	31	422	70	11	57	13.6	2.3	0.4	1.8	
Mike Conley^{x}	G	Ohio State	4	2022–2026	225	5,693	568	1,045	2,033	25.3	2.5	4.6	9.0	
Will Conroy	G	Washington	1	2012–2013	4	20	1	0	1	5.0	0.3	0.0	0.3	
Tyrone Corbin	F	DePaul	3	1989–1992	175	6,551	1,262	596	2,833	37.4	7.2	3.4	16.2	
Robert Covington	G	Tennessee State	2	2018–2020	70	6,551	413	88	933	31.1	5.9	1.3	13.3	
Allen Crabbe	G	Cal	1	2019–2020	9	131	12	5	29	14.6	1.3	0.6	3.2	
Jamal Crawford	G	Michigan	1	2017–2018	80	1,653	99	185	822	20.7	1.2	2.3	10.3	
Mitch Creek	G/F	(Australia) Adelaide 36ers	1	2018–2019	1	12	2	1	6	12.0	2.0	1.0	6.0	
Jarrett Culver	G	Texas Tech	2	2019–2021	97	2,005	316	134	760	20.7	3.3	1.4	7.8	
Dante Cunningham	F	Villanova	2	2012–2014	161	3,645	738	150	1,205	22.6	4.6	0.9	7.5	
Bill Curley	F	Boston College	2	1997–1999	46	518	79	18	112	11.3	1.7	0.4	2.4	
Troy Daniels	G	VCU	1	2014–2015	19	154	19	13	53	8.1	1.0	0.7	2.8	
Brian Davis	G/F	Duke	1	1993–1994	68	374	55	22	131	5.5	0.8	0.3	1.9	
Ed Davis	F/C	UNC	1	2020–2021	23	299	115	21	48	13.0	5.0	0.9	2.1	
Ricky Davis	G	Iowa	2	2005–2007	117	4,481	479	558	2,063	38.3	4.1	4.8	17.6	
Todd Day	G	Arkansas	2	2000–2001	31	345	37	28	132	11.1	1.2	0.9	4.3	
Luol Deng	F	Duke	1	2018–2019	22	392	73	18	157	17.8	3.3	0.8	7.1	
Gorgui Dieng	C	Louisville	7	2013–2020	498	11,026	3,068	687	3,935	22.1	6.2	1.4	7.9	
Rob Dillingham	G	Kentucky	2	2024–2026	84	842	91	156	340	10.0	1.1	1.9	4.0	
Donte DiVincenzo^{x}	G	Villanova	2	2024–2026	144	4,100	564	538	1,723	28.5	3.9	3.7	12.0	
Michael Doleac	C	Utah	1	2007–2008	24	257	49	7	57	10.7	2.0	0.3	2.4	
Ayo Dosunmu^{x}	G	Illinois	1	2025–2026	24	694	101	85	345	28.9	4.2	3.5	14.4	
PJ Dozier	G/F	South Carolina	1	2024–2025	9	35	5	5	7	3.9	0.6	0.6	0.8	
Kris Dunn	G	Providence	1	2016–2017	78	1,333	166	188	293	17.1	2.1	2.4	3.8	
Ronald Dupree	F	LSU	1	2005–2006	36	265	49	14	80	7.4	1.4	0.4	2.2	
Pat Durham	F	Colorado State	1	1994–1995	59	852	94	53	302	14.4	1.6	0.9	5.1	

=== E to G ===
All-time roster
Player	Pos.	Pre-draft team	Yrs	Seasons	Statistics									Ref.
Player	Pos.	Pre-draft team	Yrs	Seasons	GP	MP	REB	AST	PTS	MPG	RPG	APG	PPG	Ref.
Ndudi Ebi	F	Westbury Christian School	2	2003–2005	19	86	19	4	40	4.5	1.0	0.2	2.1	
Anthony Edwards*	G	Georgia	6	2020–2026	442	15,400	2,319	1,826	10,854	34.8	5.2	4.1	24.6	
Jesse Edwards	C	West Virginia	1	2024–2025	2	5	0	1	0	2.5	0.0	0.5	0.0	
Howard Eisley	G	Boston College	1	1994–1995	34	496	42	77	113	14.6	1.2	2.3	3.3	
Wayne Ellington	G	North Carolina	3	2009–2012	189	3,538	366	179	1,226	18.7	1.9	0.9	6.5	
LaPhonso Ellis	F	Notre Dame	1	2000–2001	82	1,948	494	93	772	23.8	6.0	1.1	9.4	
Brian Evans	F	Indiana	1	1998–1999	5	24	2	1	4	4.8	0.4	0.2	0.8	
Jacob Evans	G	Cincinnati	1	2019–2020	2	4	0	0	0	2.0	0.0	0.0	0.0	
Maurice Evans	G	Texas	1	2001–2002	10	49	4	4	21	4.5	0.4	0.4	2.1	
Jonny Flynn	G	Syracuse	2	2009–2011	134	3,322	268	538	1,373	24.8	2.0	4.0	10.2	
Bryn Forbes	G	Michigan State	1	2022–2023	25	268	15	17	89	10.7	0.6	0.7	3.6	
Greg Foster	F/C	UTEP	1	1994–1995	61	845	205	23	281	13.9	3.4	0.4	4.6	
Randy Foye	G	Villanova	3	2006–2009	191	5,632	560	699	2,481	29.5	2.9	3.7	13.0	
Richie Frahm	G	Gonzaga	1	2005–2006	25	225	23	15	66	9.0	0.9	0.6	2.6	
Tellis Frank	F/C	Western Kentucky	2	1991–1994	77	1,099	246	65	234	14.3	3.2	0.8	3.0	
Enrique Freeman^{x}	F	Akron	1	2025–2026	4	37	10	2	13	9.3	2.5	0.5	3.3	
Sundiata Gaines	G	Georgia	1	2010–2011	8	65	6	6	21	8.1	0.8	0.8	2.6	
Winston Garland	G	Missouri State	1	1994–1995	73	1,931	168	318	448	26.5	2.3	4.4	6.1	
Kevin Garnett^	F/C	Farragut Career Academy	14	1995–2007; 2014–2016	970	36,189	10,718	4,216	19,201	37.3	11.0	4.3	19.8	
Dean Garrett	C	Indiana	5	1996–1997; 1998–2002	272	4,306	1,156	113	1,131	15.8	4.3	0.4	4.2	
Tom Garrick	G	Rhode Island	1	1991–1992	15	112	9	18	29	7.5	0.6	1.2	1.9	
Luka Garza	C	Iowa	3	2022–2025	92	584	148	33	418	6.3	1.6	0.4	4.5	
Mickaël Gelabale	G/F	(France) Real Madrid	1	2012–2013	36	644	99	26	181	17.9	2.8	0.7	5.0	
Marcus Georges-Hunt	G	Georgia Tech	1	2017–2018	42	224	16	7	59	5.3	0.4	0.2	1.4	
Taj Gibson	F	USC	2	2017–2019	152	4,412	1,042	183	1,752	29.0	6.9	1.2	11.5	
Kendall Gill	G	Illinois	1	2002–2003	82	4,412	248	156	714	25.2	3.0	1.9	8.7	
Gerald Glass	G/F	Mississippi	3	1990–1993	130	2,499	365	226	1,231	19.2	2.8	1.7	9.5	
Rudy Gobert^{x}	C	(France) Cholet Basket	4	2022–2026	294	9,510	3,453	444	3,695	32.3	11.7	1.5	12.6	
Dan Godfread	C	Evansville	1	1990–1991	10	20	2	0	13	2.0	0.2	0.0	1.3	
Anthony Goldwire	G	Houston	1	2003–2004	5	66	6	10	13	13.2	1.2	2.0	2.6	
Ryan Gomes	F	Providence	3	2007–2010	240	7,258	1,215	404	2,957	30.2	5.1	1.7	12.3	
Treveon Graham	G	VCU	1	2019–2020	33	663	100	30	171	20.1	3.0	0.9	5.2	
Paul Grant	C	Wisconsin	1	1998–1999	4	8	1	0	2	2.0	0.3	0.0	0.5	
Gerald Green	F	Gulf Shores Academy	1	2007–2008	29	358	62	29	147	12.3	2.1	1.0	5.1	
Eddie Griffin	F	Seton Hall	3	2004–2007	153	2,943	867	97	865	19.2	5.7	0.6	5.7	
Tom Gugliotta^{+}	F	NC State	4	1994–1998	231	8,566	1,970	879	4,201	37.1	8.5	3.8	18.2	
Andrés Guibert	C	Cuba	2	1993–1995	22	200	61	12	60	9.1	2.8	0.5	2.7	

=== H to J ===
All-time roster
Player	Pos.	Pre-draft team	Yrs	Seasons	Statistics									Ref.
Player	Pos.	Pre-draft team	Yrs	Seasons	GP	MP	REB	AST	PTS	MPG	RPG	APG	PPG	Ref.
Ashton Hagans	G	Kentucky	1	2020–2021	2	4	0	0	0	2.0	0.0	0.0	0.0	
Justin Hamilton	C	LSU	1	2014–2015	17	423	86	24	153	24.9	5.1	1.4	9.0	
Tom Hammonds	F	Georgia Tech	4	1997–2001	169	2,258	512	67	682	13.4	3.0	0.4	4.0	
Jason Hart	G	Syracuse	1	2009–2010	1	5	0	1	0	5.0	0.0	1.0	0.0	
Trenton Hassell	F	Austin Peay	4	2003–2007	316	9,069	935	667	2,169	28.7	3.0	2.1	6.9	
Lazar Hayward	F	Marquette	2	2010–2011; 2012–2013	46	450	74	31	170	9.8	1.6	0.7	3.7	
Shane Heal	G	Australia	1	1996–1997	43	236	18	33	75	5.5	0.4	0.8	1.7	
Juancho Hernangómez	F	(Spain) CB Estudiantes	2	2019–2021	66	1,311	307	53	556	19.9	4.7	0.8	8.4	
Jordan Hill	F	Arizona	1	2016–2017	7	47	14	0	12	6.7	2.0	0.0	1.7	
Fred Hoiberg	G	Iowa State	2	2003–2005	155	3,076	449	194	967	19.8	2.9	1.3	6.2	
Ryan Hollins	C	UCLA	1	2009–2010	73	1,223	207	51	447	16.8	2.8	0.7	6.1	
Josh Howard	G/F	Wake Forest	1	2012–2013	11	207	36	4	74	18.8	3.3	0.4	6.7	
Troy Hudson	G	Southern Illinois	5	2002–2007	257	6,186	415	984	2,576	24.1	1.6	3.8	10.0	
Robbie Hummel	F	Purdue	2	2013–2015	98	1,397	266	50	379	14.3	2.7	0.5	3.9	
Bones Hyland^{x}	G	VCU	2	2024–2026	75	1,194	128	192	609	15.9	1.7	2.6	8.1	
Joe Ingles^{x}	F	Australia	2	2024–2026	46	267	30	57	56	5.8	0.7	1.2	1.2	
Bobby Jackson	G	Minnesota	2	1998–2000	123	1,975	288	339	722	16.1	2.3	2.8	5.9	
Justin Jackson	F	Minnesota	1	2024–2025	2	1	0	0	0	0.5	0.0	0.0	0.0	
Marc Jackson	C	Temple	2	2001–2003	99	1,367	310	44	523	13.8	3.1	0.4	5.3	
Stanley Jackson	G	UAB	1	1993–1994	17	92	27	16	38	5.4	1.6	0.9	2.2	
Sam Jacobson	G/F	Minnesota	1	2000–2001	14	59	6	4	20	4.2	0.4	0.3	1.4	
Mike James	G	Duquesne	1	2006–2007	82	2,069	163	297	828	25.2	2.0	3.6	10.1	
Marko Jarić	G	(Serbia) Virtus Pallacanestro Bologna	3	2005–2008	220	5,846	639	749	1,579	26.6	2.9	3.4	7.2	
Nathan Jawai	F	Midland College	1	2009–2010	39	412	104	24	124	10.6	2.7	0.6	3.2	
Othyus Jeffers	G	Robert Morris	1	2013–2014	2	13	3	0	2	6.5	1.5	0.0	1.0	
Al Jefferson	F	Prentiss High School	3	2007–2010	208	7,218	2,162	333	4,183	34.7	10.4	1.6	20.1	
Chris Johnson	C	LSU	1	2012–2013	30	284	60	8	117	9.5	2.0	0.3	3.9	
Ervin Johnson	C	New Orleans	2	2003–2005	112	1,375	345	30	200	12.3	3.1	0.3	1.8	
James Johnson	F	Wake Forest	1	2019–2020	14	338	66	53	168	24.1	4.7	3.8	12.0	
Steve Johnson	F/C	Oregon State	1	1989–1990	4	17	3	1	0	4.3	0.8	0.3	0.0	
Wesley Johnson	G/F	Syracuse	2	2010–2012	144	3,538	417	207	1,102	24.6	2.9	1.4	7.7	
Askia Jones	G	Kansas State	2	1994–1995	11	139	11	16	45	12.6	1.0	1.5	4.1	
Tyus Jones	G	Duke	4	2015–2019	247	4,374	380	823	1,249	17.7	1.5	3.3	5.1	
Reggie Jordan	G	New Mexico State	3	1996–1999	94	814	160	92	220	8.7	1.7	1.0	2.3	
Johnny Juzang	G	UCLA	1	2025–2026	21	88	17	6	43	4.2	0.8	0.3	2.0	

=== K to L ===
All-time roster
Player	Pos.	Pre-draft team	Yrs	Seasons	Statistics									Ref.
Player	Pos.	Pre-draft team	Yrs	Seasons	GP	MP	REB	AST	PTS	MPG	RPG	APG	PPG	Ref.
Sean Kilpatrick	G	Cincinnati	1	2014–2015	4	72	6	4	22	18.0	1.5	1.0	5.5	
Stacey King	C	Oklahoma	2	1993–1995	68	1,308	274	45	479	19.2	4.0	0.7	7.0	
Andrei Kirilenko	C	(Russia) CSKA Moscow	1	2013–2014	64	2,034	362	177	791	31.8	5.7	2.8	12.4	
Nathan Knight	C	William & Mary	2	2021–2023	75	558	141	35	277	7.4	1.9	0.5	3.7	
Kosta Koufos	C	Ohio State	1	2010–2011	39	336	97	7	106	8.6	2.5	0.2	2.7	
Christian Laettner	C/F	Duke	4	1992–1996	276	9,539	2,225	893	4,759	34.6	8.1	3.2	17.2	
Andrew Lang	C	Arkansas	1	1995–1996	20	9,539	550	3	121	27.5	6.1	0.2	8.8	
Zach LaVine	G	UCLA	3	2014–2017	206	5,945	602	666	2,817	28.9	2.9	3.2	13.7	
A. J. Lawson	G	South Carolina	1	2022–2023	1	2	1	0	2	2.0	1.0	0.0	2.0	
Jake Layman	F	Maryland	3	2019–2022	102	1,363	160	52	522	13.4	1.6	0.5	5.1	
Malcolm Lee	G	UCLA	2	2011–2013	35	532	65	51	140	15.2	1.9	1.5	4.0	
Gary Leonard	C	Missouri	1	1989–1990	22	127	27	1	32	5.8	1.2	0.0	1.5	
Quincy Lewis	F	Minnesota	1	2003–2004	14	65	7	2	16	4.6	0.5	0.1	1.1	
Brad Lohaus	C/F	Iowa	1	1989–1990	28	590	110	62	210	21.1	3.9	2.2	7.5	
Luc Longley	C	New Mexico	3	1991–1994	170	3,025	792	150	924	17.8	4.7	0.9	5.4	
Felipe López	G	St. John's	2	2000–2002	90	1,038	154	73	339	11.5	1.7	0.8	3.8	
Kevin Love^{+}	F	UCLA	6	2008–2014	364	11,933	4,453	898	6,989	32.8	12.2	2.5	19.2	
Sidney Lowe	G	NC State	1	1989–1990	80	1,744	163	337	187	21.8	2.0	4.2	2.3	
John Lucas III	G	Oklahoma State	1	2016–2017	5	11	0	1	2	2.2	0.0	0.2	0.4	

=== M to N ===
All-time roster
Player	Pos.	Pre-draft team	Yrs	Seasons	Statistics									Ref.
Player	Pos.	Pre-draft team	Yrs	Seasons	GP	MP	REB	AST	PTS	MPG	RPG	APG	PPG	Ref.
Mark Madsen	F	Stanford	6	2003–2009	270	3,262	684	75	497	12.1	2.5	0.3	1.8	
Stephon Marbury	G	Georgia Tech	3	1996–1999	167	6,097	476	1,393	2,826	36.5	2.9	8.3	16.9	
Donyell Marshall	F	UConn	1	1994–1995	40	1,036	196	57	431	25.9	4.9	1.4	10.8	
Darrick Martin	G	UCLA	3	1994–1995; 1995–1996; 2003–2004	85	1,722	115	312	563	20.3	1.4	3.7	6.6	
Kelan Martin	F	Butler	1	2020–2021	31	495	96	23	197	16.0	3.1	0.7	6.4	
Kevin Martin	G	Western Carolina	3	2013–2016	146	4,313	426	256	2,492	17.1	2.9	1.8	17.1	
Marlon Maxey	F	UTEP	2	1992–1994	98	1,146	363	22	497	11.7	3.7	0.2	4.9	
Luc Mbah a Moute	F	UCLA	1	2013–2014	55	807	119	21	184	14.7	2.2	0.4	3.3	
Bob McCann	F	Morehead State	1	1992–1993	79	1,536	282	68	495	19.4	3.6	0.9	6.3	
Rashad McCants	G	North Carolina	4	2005–2009	225	4,572	459	295	2,233	20.3	2.0	1.3	9.9	
Jaden McDaniels^{x}	F	Washington	6	2020–2026	439	12,765	1,863	761	4,868	29.1	4.2	1.7	11.1	
Jordan McLaughlin	G	USC	5	2019–2024	242	3,734	385	756	1,074	15.4	1.6	3.1	4.4	
Keith McLeod	G	Bowling Green	1	2003–2004	33	391	34	59	88	11.8	1.0	1.8	2.7	
Darko Miličić	C	(Serbia) KK Hemofarm	3	2010–2013	122	2,772	590	164	939	22.7	4.8	1.3	7.7	
Andre Miller	G	Utah	1	2015–2016	26	280	24	58	88	10.8	0.9	2.2	3.4	
Brad Miller	C	Purdue	1	2011–2012	15	146	19	24	35	9.7	1.3	1.6	2.3	
Leonard Miller	F	(Canada) Fort Erie International Academy	3	2023–2026	49	179	56	13	93	3.7	1.1	0.3	1.9	
Mike Miller	F	Florida	1	2008–2009	73	2,356	483	326	722	32.3	6.6	4.5	9.9	
Oliver Miller	C	Arkansas	1	2003–2004	48	506	130	36	121	10.5	2.7	0.8	2.5	
Shake Milton	G	SMU	1	2023–2024	38	491	51	50	178	12.9	1.3	1.3	4.7	
Josh Minott	F	Memphis	3	2022–2025	93	463	89	31	215	5.0	1.0	0.3	2.3	
Sam Mitchell	F	Mercer	10	1989–1992; 1995–2002	757	18,394	3,030	887	7,161	24.3	4.0	1.2	9.5	
Greg Monroe	C	Georgetown	1	2021–2022	4	81	24	16	29	20.3	6.0	4.0	7.3	
Wendell Moore Jr.	G/F	Duke	2	2022–2024	54	228	30	24	60	4.2	0.6	0.4	1.1	
Monté Morris	G	Iowa State	1	2023–2024	27	408	45	61	137	15.1	1.7	2.3	5.1	
Shabazz Muhammad	G	UCLA	5	2013–2018	267	4,655	739	144	2,410	17.4	2.8	0.5	9.0	
Tod Murphy	F/C	UC Irvine	3	1989–1992	181	3,985	929	177	1,029	22.0	5.1	1.0	5.7	
Shabazz Napier	G	UConn	1	2019–2020	36	856	110	75	347	23.8	3.1	5.2	9.6	
Gary Neal	G	Towson	1	2014–2015	11	262	35	20	130	23.8	3.2	1.8	11.8	
Radoslav Nesterović	C	(Slovenia) Virtus Pallacanestro Bologna	5	1998–2003	316	7,541	1,711	328	2,388	23.9	5.4	1.0	7.5	
Tristen Newton	G	UConn	1	2024–2025	3	8	4	1	0	2.7	1.3	0.3	0.0	
Daishen Nix	G	Trinity International	2	2023–2025	18	63	7	9	28	3.5	0.4	0.5	1.6	
Jaylen Nowell	G	Washington	4	2019–2023	184	3,137	401	343	1,667	17.0	2.2	1.9	9.1	
James Nunnally	G/F	UC Santa Barbara	1	2018–2019	13	64	4	5	27	4.9	0.3	0.4	2.1	

=== O to P ===
All-time roster
Player	Pos.	Pre-draft team	Yrs	Seasons	Statistics									Ref.
Player	Pos.	Pre-draft team	Yrs	Seasons	GP	MP	REB	AST	PTS	MPG	RPG	APG	PPG	Ref.
Josh Okogie	G	Georgia Tech	4	2018–2022	244	5,017	712	279	1,552	20.6	2.9	1.1	6.4	
Kevin Ollie	G	UConn	1	2008–2009	50	850	75	117	202	17.0	1.5	2.3	4.0	
Michael Olowokandi	C	Pacific	3	2003–2006	137	2,892	748	70	839	21.1	5.5	0.5	6.1	
Arinze Onuaku	C	Syracuse	1	2014–2015	6	68	21	4	17	11.3	3.5	0.7	4.5	
Robert Pack	G	USC	1	2001–2002	16	252	23	49	62	15.8	1.4	3.1	3.9	
Cherokee Parks	F/C	Duke	2	1996–1998	155	2,664	632	87	810	17.2	4.1	0.6	5.2	
Andrae Patterson	F	Indiana	2	1998–2000	40	304	67	16	120	7.6	1.7	0.4	3.0	
Justin Patton	C	Creighton	1	2017–2018	1	4	0	0	2	4.0	0.0	0.0	2.0	
Sasha Pavlović	G/F	(Serbia) KK Budućnost Podgorica	1	2009–2010	71	877	117	58	263	12.4	1.6	0.8	3.7	
Adreian Payne	F	Michigan State	3	2014–2017	99	1,341	302	66	403	13.5	3.1	0.7	4.1	
Oleksiy Pecherov	C	(Ukraine) Paris Basket Racing	1	2009–2010	44	447	124	11	197	10.2	2.8	0.3	4.5	
Anthony Peeler	G	Missouri	6	1997–2003	379	10,305	1,058	1,000	3,622	27.2	2.8	2.6	9.6	
Nikola Peković	C	(Montenegro) Panathinaikos B.C.	6	2010–2016	271	6,741	1,807	199	3,405	24.9	6.7	0.7	12.6	
Chuck Person	F	Auburn	2	1992–1994	155	5,014	686	528	2,203	32.3	4.4	3.4	14.2	
Julian Phillips^{x}	F	Tennessee	1	2025–2026	13	94	5	3	41	7.2	0.4	0.2	3.2	
Terry Porter	G	Wisconsin–Stevens Point	3	1995–1998	246	5,426	556	1,018	2,118	22.1	2.3	4.1	8.6	
A.J. Price	G	UConn	1	2013–2014	28	99	10	13	44	3.5	0.4	0.5	1.6	
Taurean Prince	F	Baylor	2	2021–2023	123	2,369	306	152	995	19.3	2.5	1.2	1.6	
Tayshaun Prince	F	Kentucky	1	2015–2016	77	1,462	147	73	221	19.0	1.9	0.9	2.9	
Zyon Pullin^{x}	G	Florida	1	2025–2026	5	43	3	9	6	8.6	0.6	1.8	4.6	

=== R ===
All-time roster
Player	Pos.	Pre-draft team	Yrs	Seasons	Statistics									Ref.
Player	Pos.	Pre-draft team	Yrs	Seasons	GP	MP	REB	AST	PTS	MPG	RPG	APG	PPG	Ref.
Miroslav Raduljica	C	(Serbia) Azovmash Mariupol	1	2014–2015	5	23	5	0	8	4.6	1.0	0.0	1.6	
Igor Rakočević	G	(Serbia) KK Budućnost Podgorica	1	2002–2003	42	244	17	33	78	5.8	0.4	0.8	1.9	
Mark Randall	F	Kansas	2	1991–1993	41	382	62	27	145	9.3	1.5	0.7	3.5	
Julius Randle^{x}	F	Kentucky	2	2024–2026	148	4,836	1,019	721	2,955	32.7	6.9	4.9	20.0	
Anthony Randolph	F	LSU	2	2010–2012	57	980	243	45	145	17.2	4.3	0.8	9.2	
Theo Ratliff	F/C	Wyoming	1	2007–2008	10	214	39	7	63	21.4	3.9	0.7	6.3	
Justin Reed	F	Mississippi	2	2005–2007	81	1,024	141	51	356	12.6	1.7	0.6	4.4	
Naz Reid^{x}	C	LSU	7	2019–2027	483	10,479	2,460	712	5,745	21.7	5.1	1.5	11.9	
Cameron Reynolds	G	Tulane	1	2018–2019	19	259	31	13	95	13.6	1.6	0.7	5.0	
Chris Richard	F	Florida	1	2007–2008	52	556	135	18	98	10.7	2.6	0.3	1.9	
Pooh Richardson	G	UCLA	3	1989–1992	246	8,657	804	1,973	3,689	35.2	3.3	8.0	15.0	
Isaiah Rider	G	UNLV	3	1993–1996	229	7,654	874	660	4,315	33.4	3.8	2.9	18.8	
Luke Ridnour	G	Oregon	3	2010–2013	206	6,383	546	947	2,418	31.0	2.7	4.6	11.7	
Eric Riley	C	Michigan	1	1995–1996	25	310	76	5	92	12.4	3.0	0.2	3.7	
Austin Rivers	G	Duke	1	2022–2023	52	1,016	83	75	255	19.5	1.6	1.4	4.9	
Stanley Roberts	C	LSU	1	1997–1998	74	1,328	363	27	457	17.9	4.9	0.4	6.2	
Glenn Robinson III	F	Michigan	1	2014–2015	25	108	14	3	29	4.3	0.6	0.1	1.2	
James Robinson	G	Alabama	2	1996–1998	86	1,535	147	164	649	17.8	1.7	1.9	7.5	
Sean Rooks	C	Arizona	2	1994–1996	129	3,307	690	135	1,199	25.6	5.3	1.0	9.3	
Derrick Rose	G	Memphis	2	2017–2019	60	1,504	146	231	969	25.1	2.4	3.9	16.2	
Scott Roth	F	Wisconsin	1	1989–1990	71	1,061	112	115	486	14.9	1.6	1.6	6.8	
Brandon Roy	G	Washington	1	2012–2013	5	122	14	23	29	24.4	2.8	4.6	5.8	
Donald Royal	F	Notre Dame	1	1989–1990	66	746	137	43	387	11.3	2.1	0.7	5.9	
Clifford Rozier	F/C	Louisville	1	1997–1998	6	30	6	0	6	5.0	2.1	0.7	1.0	
Ricky Rubio	G	(Spain) FC Barcelona Bàsquet	7	2011–2017; 2020–2021	421	12,989	1,721	3,424	4,235	30.9	4.1	8.1	10.1	
Damjan Rudež	G	(Croatia) CAI Zaragoza	1	2015–2016	33	277	20	11	75	8.4	0.6	0.3	2.3	
Brandon Rush	F	Kansas	1	2016–2017	47	1,030	99	45	197	21.9	2.1	1.0	4.2	
D'Angelo Russell	G	Ohio State	4	2019–2023	173	5,443	547	1,117	3,199	31.5	3.2	6.5	18.5	
Matt Ryan	F	Chattanooga	1	2022–2023	22	181	12	12	75	8.2	0.5	0.5	3.4	

=== S to T ===
All-time roster
Player	Pos.	Pre-draft team	Yrs	Seasons	Statistics									Ref.
Player	Pos.	Pre-draft team	Yrs	Seasons	GP	MP	REB	AST	PTS	MPG	RPG	APG	PPG	Ref.
Dario Šarić	F	(Croatia) Anadolu Efes S.K.	1	2018–2019	68	1,627	371	101	714	23.9	5.5	1.5	10.5	
Dennis Scott	F	Georgia Tech	1	1998–1999	21	532	38	32	191	25.3	1.8	1.5	9.1	
Malik Sealy (#2)	G	St. John's	2	1998–2000	113	3,123	444	233	1,180	27.6	3.9	2.1	10.4	
Brad Sellers	F/C	Ohio State	2	1989–1990; 1992–1993	68	646	102	47	182	9.5	1.5	0.7	2.7	
Ramon Sessions	G	Nevada	1	2009–2010	82	1,732	214	258	674	21.1	2.6	3.1	8.2	
Charles Shackleford	F/C	NC State	1	1994–1995	21	239	67	8	94	11.4	3.2	0.4	4.5	
Terrence Shannon Jr.^{x}	G	Illinois	2	2024–2026	75	877	96	70	379	11.7	1.3	0.9	5.1	
Alexey Shved	G	(Russia) CSKA Moscow	2	2012–2014	140	2,504	256	354	915	17.9	1.8	2.5	6.5	
Chris Silva	F	South Carolina	1	2021–2022	1	3	1	0	0	3.0	1.0	0.0	0.0	
Reggie Slater	F	Wyoming	2	2000–2001; 2002–2003	81	827	217	30	335	10.2	2.7	0.4	4.1	
Charles Smith	G	Georgetown	1	1995–1996	8	39	5	6	5	4.9	0.6	0.8	0.8	
Chris Smith	G	UConn	3	1992–1995	224	3,956	291	627	1,140	17.7	1.3	2.8	5.1	
Craig Smith	F	Boston College	3	2006–2009	233	4,544	1,053	188	2,081	19.5	4.5	0.8	8.9	
Greg Smith	F/C	Fresno State	1	2015–2016	18	192	42	6	43	10.7	2.3	0.3	2.4	
Joe Smith	F	Fresno State	4	1998–2000; 2001–2003	247	6,432	1,561	276	2,533	26.0	6.3	1.1	10.3	
Kirk Snyder	G	Nevada	1	2007–2008	27	680	114	56	227	25.2	4.2	2.1	8.4	
Felton Spencer	C	Louisville	3	1990–1993	213	4,876	1,400	95	1,270	22.9	6.6	0.4	6.0	
Latrell Sprewell	G	Alabama	2	2003–2005	162	5,550	564	465	2,396	34.3	3.5	2.9	14.8	
Lance Stephenson	G	Cincinnati	1	2016–2017	6	67	10	5	21	11.2	1.7	0.8	3.5	
Greg Stiemsma	C	Wisconsin	1	2012–2013	76	1,209	261	30	307	15.9	3.4	0.4	4.0	
Rod Strickland	G	DePaul	1	2002–2003	47	956	95	215	320	20.3	2.0	4.6	6.8	
Wally Szczerbiak^{+}	F	Miami (Ohio)	7	1999–2006	438	14,715	1,932	1,190	6,777	33.6	4.4	2.7	15.5	
Jeff Teague	G	Wake Forest	3	2017–2020	146	4,520	403	1,044	1,952	31.0	2.8	7.1	13.4	
Sebastian Telfair	G	Abraham Lincoln High School	3	2007–2009; 2010–2011	172	4,739	316	809	1,560	27.6	1.8	4.7	9.1	
Jared Terrell	G	Rhode Island	1	2018–2019	14	111	6	12	31	7.9	0.4	0.9	2.2	
Jim Thomas	G	Indiana	1	1990–1991	3	14	0	1	2	4.7	0.0	0.3	0.7	
John Thomas	F	Minnesota	1	2004–2005	44	521	97	17	111	11.8	2.2	0.4	2.5	
Bob Thornton	F/C	UC Irivine	1	1990–1991	12	110	15	1	16	9.2	1.3	0.1	1.3	
Anthony Tolliver	C	Creighton	3	2010–2012; 2018–2019	181	3,323	625	150	968	18.4	3.5	0.8	5.3	
Karl-Anthony Towns^{+}	F/C	Kentucky	9	2015–2024	573	19,455	6,216	1,815	13,121	34.0	10.8	3.2	22.9	
Gary Trent	F	Ohio	3	2002–2005	212	3,387	777	186	1,333	16.0	3.7	0.9	6.3	
Nikoloz Tskitishvili	F	(Georgia (country)) Pallacanestro Treviso	1	2005–2006	5	13	2	0	3	2.6	0.4	0.0	0.6	
Alando Tucker	F	Wisconsin	1	2009–2010	4	25	3	1	8	6.3	0.8	0.3	2.0	
Ronny Turiaf	C	Gonzaga	2	2013–2015	33	625	175	26	149	18.9	5.3	0.8	4.5	

=== V to Z ===
All-time roster
Player	Pos.	Pre-draft team	Yrs	Seasons	Statistics									Ref.
Player	Pos.	Pre-draft team	Yrs	Seasons	GP	MP	REB	AST	PTS	MPG	RPG	APG	PPG	Ref.
Jarred Vanderbilt	G	Kentucky	3	2019–2022	140	3,024	993	170	858	21.6	7.1	1.2	6.1	
Gundars Vētra	F	(Latvia) BC VEF Rīga	1	1992–1993	13	89	8	6	12	6.8	0.6	0.5	3.5	
Noah Vonleh	C	Indiana	1	2019–2020	29	347	116	26	119	12.0	4.0	0.9	4.1	
Stojko Vranković	C	(Croatia) Aris B.C.	1	1996–1997	53	766	168	14	181	14.5	3.2	0.3	3.4	
Antoine Walker	F	Kentucky	1	2007–2008	46	892	168	45	368	19.4	3.7	1.0	8.0	
T.J. Warren	F	NC State	1	2023–2024	11	125	22	9	41	11.4	2.0	0.8	3.7	
Spud Webb	G	NC State	1	1995–1996	26	645	40	154	244	24.8	1.5	5.9	9.4	
Martell Webster	G/F	Seattle Preparatory School	2	2010–2012	93	2,234	315	93	777	24.0	3.4	1.0	8.4	
Doug West	G/F	Villanova	9	1989–1998	609	15,603	1,559	1,216	6,216	25.6	2.6	2.0	10.2	
DeJuan Wheat	G	Louisville	1	1997–1998	34	150	11	25	57	4.4	0.3	0.7	1.7	
Andrew Wiggins	F	Kansas	6	2014–2020	442	15,839	1,922	1,022	8,710	35.8	4.3	2.3	19.7	
Damien Wilkins	F	Georgia	1	2009–2010	80	1,585	249	135	451	19.8	3.1	1.7	5.6	
Mike Wilks	G	Georgia	1	2002–2003	31	324	30	50	62	10.5	1.0	1.6	2.0	
C. J. Williams	G/F	NC State	1	2018–2019	15	128	8	12	39	8.5	0.5	0.8	2.6	
Corey Williams	G	Oklahoma State	1	1993–1994	4	46	6	6	11	11.5	1.5	1.5	2.8	
Derrick Williams	F	Arizona	3	2011–2014	155	3,496	767	85	1,570	22.6	4.9	0.5	10.1	
Micheal Williams	G	Baylor	5	1992–1998	182	5,245	532	1,239	2,247	28.8	2.9	6.8	12.3	
Mo Williams	G	Alabama	1	2014–2015	41	1,149	98	261	499	28.0	2.4	6.4	12.2	
Shelden Williams	F	Duke	1	2008–2009	15	207	75	4	74	13.8	5.0	0.3	4.9	
Trevor Winter	C	Minnesota	1	1998–1999	1	5	3	0	0	5.0	3.0	0.0	0.0	
Loren Woods	F/C	Arizona	2	2001–2003	98	869	217	41	190	8.9	2.2	0.4	1.9	
Bracey Wright	G	Indiana	2	2005–2007	26	325	39	20	129	12.5	1.5	0.8	5.0	
McKinley Wright IV	G	Colorado	1	2021–2022	5	19	0	3	5	3.8	0.0	0.6	1.0	
Thaddeus Young	F	Georgia Tech	1	2014–2015	48	1,605	245	135	685	33.4	5.1	2.8	14.3	
Rocco Zikarsky^{x}	C	Australia	1	2025–2026	5	36	14	2	14	7.2	2.8	0.4	2.8	
