= 2023–24 Minnesota Timberwolves season =

2023–24 NBA season by team

- Head coach: Chris Finch
- General manager: Tim Connelly
- Owner: Glen Taylor
- Arena: Target Center

Results
- Record: 56–26 (.683)
- Place: Division: 3rd (Northwest); Conference: 3rd (Western)
- Playoff finish: Conference finals (lost to Mavericks 1–4)
- Stats at Basketball Reference

Local media
- Television: Bally Sports North
- Radio: KFXN

The 2023–24 Minnesota Timberwolves season was the 35th season for the franchise in the National Basketball Association (NBA). Entering the second season of the "Big 3" consisting of guard Anthony Edwards, center/forward Karl-Anthony Towns and center Rudy Gobert, the team sought to improve upon its 42–40 record from the previous season and make its third consecutive playoff appearance.

After starting this season out 1–2, Minnesota went on a 7-game winning streak to start out the month of November before losing to the Phoenix Suns on November 15. The early winning streak they had early in November later led to them having quality winning record months throughout November, December, and January, to the point where the Timberwolves entered the 2024 NBA All-Star Weekend as the surprise best team of the Western Conference with a 39–16 record and with head coach Chris Finch coaching his first All-Star Game in the NBA. They later matched their overall win total from the previous season by the end of February.

On March 4, 2024, with a win over the Portland Trail Blazers, the Timberwolves improved upon their previous season's record of 42–40.

On April 1, 2024, the Timberwolves clinched their 3rd consecutive playoff berth following the Phoenix Suns' 124–111 win over the New Orleans Pelicans.

The regular season is notable for being the first since 2004 in which the Timberwolves won at least 50 games, a feat achieved following the team's win over the Detroit Pistons on March 27, 2024. The Timberwolves had the best team defensive rating in the NBA.

On April 28, 2024, the Timberwolves secured their first playoff series win since the 2003–04 season, and third overall win in franchise history. The team dispatched a 4–0 series victory over the Phoenix Suns in the Western Conference quarterfinals. This series also marked the first 3–0 lead and first playoff series sweep in franchise history. In the semifinals, the Timberwolves went on to defeat the defending champion Denver Nuggets in 7 games to advance to the Western Conference Finals for the first time in twenty years. However, the team was swiftly ousted by the Luka Dončić and Kyrie Irving-led Dallas Mavericks in the Western Conference Finals, succumbing in five games.

The Minnesota Timberwolves drew an average home attendance of 18,024 in 41 home games in the 2023-24 NBA season, the 18th highest in the league. The total attendance was 738,984.

== Draft ==
Round	Pick	Player	Position(s)	Nationality	College / Club
2	53	Jaylen Clark	SG	United States	UCLA (Jr.)

The Timberwolves had one second-round pick entering the draft, which was originally owned by the New York Knicks and was acquired from the Charlotte Hornets. They had traded their original first-round pick to the Utah Jazz (as an exchange for Rudy Gobert in 2022) and their original second-round pick to the Memphis Grizzlies.

== Roster ==
2023–24 Minnesota Timberwolves roster
Players

Pos.	No.	Player	Height	Weight	DOB	From
G/F	9	Nickeil Alexander-Walker	6 ft 5 in (1.96 m)	205 lb (93 kg)	1998-09-02	Virginia Tech
F	1	Kyle Anderson	6 ft 9 in (2.06 m)	230 lb (104 kg)	1993-09-20	UCLA
G	0	Jaylen Clark (injured) (TW)	6 ft 4 in (1.93 m)	205 lb (93 kg)	2001-10-13	UCLA
G	10	Mike Conley Jr.	6 ft 0 in (1.83 m)	175 lb (79 kg)	1987-10-11	Ohio State
G/F	5	Anthony Edwards	6 ft 4 in (1.93 m)	225 lb (102 kg)	2001-08-05	Georgia
F/C	55	Luka Garza	6 ft 10 in (2.08 m)	243 lb (110 kg)	1998-12-27	Iowa
C	27	Rudy Gobert	7 ft 1 in (2.16 m)	258 lb (117 kg)	1992-06-26	France
F	3	Jaden McDaniels	6 ft 9 in (2.06 m)	185 lb (84 kg)	2000-09-29	Washington
G	6	Jordan McLaughlin	6 ft 0 in (1.83 m)	185 lb (84 kg)	1996-04-09	USC
F	33	Leonard Miller	6 ft 10 in (2.08 m)	210 lb (95 kg)	2003-11-26	Fort Erie (CAN)
F	8	Josh Minott	6 ft 8 in (2.03 m)	205 lb (93 kg)	2002-11-25	Memphis
G/F	7	Wendell Moore Jr.	6 ft 5 in (1.96 m)	215 lb (98 kg)	2001-09-18	Duke
G	23	Monté Morris	6 ft 2 in (1.88 m)	183 lb (83 kg)	1995-06-27	Iowa State
G	12	Daishen Nix (TW)	6 ft 3 in (1.91 m)	226 lb (103 kg)	2002-02-13	Trinity International (NV)
F/C	11	Naz Reid	6 ft 9 in (2.06 m)	264 lb (120 kg)	1999-08-26	LSU
F/C	32	Karl-Anthony Towns	7 ft 0 in (2.13 m)	248 lb (112 kg)	1995-11-15	Kentucky
F	24	T. J. Warren	6 ft 8 in (2.03 m)	220 lb (100 kg)	1993-09-05	NC State

Coaches
Head coach
- Chris Finch
Assistant(s)
- Joe Boylan
- Kevin Hanson
- Micah Nori
- Pablo Prigioni
- Elston Turner
- Corliss Williamson

Legend
- (DP) Unsigned draft pick
- (FA) Free agent
- (S) Suspended
- (GL) On assignment to G League affiliate
- (TW) Two-way affiliate player
- Injured

Roster
Updated: April 4, 2024

== Standings ==
=== Division ===
Northwest Division	W	L	PCT	GB	Home	Road	Div	GP
c – Oklahoma City Thunder	57	25	.695	–	33‍–‍8	24‍–‍17	12‍–‍4	82
x – Denver Nuggets	57	25	.695	–	33‍–‍8	24‍–‍17	10‍–‍6	82
x – Minnesota Timberwolves	56	26	.683	1.0	30‍–‍11	26‍–‍15	12‍–‍4	82
Utah Jazz	31	51	.378	26.0	21‍–‍20	10‍–‍31	5‍–‍11	82
Portland Trail Blazers	21	61	.256	36.0	11‍–‍30	10‍–‍31	1‍–‍15	82

=== Conference ===
Western Conference
#	Team	W	L	PCT	GB	GP
1	c – Oklahoma City Thunder *	57	25	.695	–	82
2	x – Denver Nuggets	57	25	.695	–	82
3	x – Minnesota Timberwolves	56	26	.683	1.0	82
4	y – Los Angeles Clippers *	51	31	.622	6.0	82
5	y – Dallas Mavericks *	50	32	.610	7.0	82
6	x – Phoenix Suns	49	33	.598	8.0	82
7	x – New Orleans Pelicans	49	33	.598	8.0	82
8	x – Los Angeles Lakers	47	35	.573	10.0	82
9	pi – Sacramento Kings	46	36	.561	11.0	82
10	pi – Golden State Warriors	46	36	.561	11.0	82
11	Houston Rockets	41	41	.500	16.0	82
12	Utah Jazz	31	51	.378	26.0	82
13	Memphis Grizzlies	27	55	.329	30.0	82
14	San Antonio Spurs	22	60	.268	35.0	82
15	Portland Trail Blazers	21	61	.256	36.0	82

== Game log ==
=== Preseason ===
2023 preseason game log
Total: 5–0 (Home: 2–0; Road: 3–0)
Preseason: 5–0 (home: 2–0; road: 3–0)

Game	Date	Team	Score	High points	High rebounds	High assists	Location Attendance	Record
1	October 5	Dallas	W 111–99	Karl-Anthony Towns (20)	Rudy Gobert (8)	Alexander-Walker, Anderson (5)	(United Arab Emirates) Etihad Arena	1–0
2	October 7	@ Dallas	W 104–96	Reid, Towns (14)	Garza, Gobert (5)	Jordan McLaughlin (4)	(United Arab Emirates) Etihad Arena; 12,009	2–0
3	October 14	@ New York	W 121–112	Naz Reid (22)	Rudy Gobert (9)	Kyle Anderson (8)	Madison Square Garden; 19,018	3–0
4	October 17	Maccabi Ra'anana	W 138–111	Luka Garza (30)	Leonard Miller (15)	Daishen Nix (10)	Target Center; 8,828	4–0
5	October 19	@ Chicago	W 114–105	Anthony Edwards (19)	Naz Reid (8)	Anderson, Milton, McLaughlin (4)	United Center; 18,754	5–0

2023–24 preseason schedule

=== Regular season ===
2023–24 game log
Total: 56–26 (Home: 30–11; Road: 26–15)
October: 1–2 (home: 1–0; road: 0–2)

Game	Date	Team	Score	High points	High rebounds	High assists	Location Attendance	Record
1	October 25	@ Toronto	L 94–97	Anthony Edwards (26)	Anthony Edwards (14)	Kyle Anderson (5)	Scotiabank Arena; 19,800	0–1
2	October 28	Miami	W 106–90	Naz Reid (25)	Rudy Gobert (14)	Anthony Edwards (7)	Target Center; 18,024	1–1
3	October 30	@ Atlanta	L 113–127	Anthony Edwards (31)	Rudy Gobert (13)	Anthony Edwards (7)	State Farm Arena; 15,504	1–2

November: 13–2 (home: 8–1; road: 5–1)

Game	Date	Team	Score	High points	High rebounds	High assists	Location Attendance	Record
4	November 1	Denver	W 110–89	Anthony Edwards (24)	Rudy Gobert (12)	Mike Conley (6)	Target Center; 18,024	2–2
5	November 4	Utah	W 123–95	Anthony Edwards (31)	Rudy Gobert (10)	Anderson, Conley, Edwards (6)	Target Center; 18,024	3–2
6	November 6	Boston	W 114–109 (OT)	Anthony Edwards (38)	Rudy Gobert (12)	Anthony Edwards (7)	Target Center; 18,024	4–2
7	November 8	New Orleans	W 122–101	Anthony Edwards (26)	Rudy Gobert (21)	Alexander-Walker, Edwards (8)	Target Center; 18,024	5–2
8	November 10	@ San Antonio	W 117–110	Karl-Anthony Towns (29)	Karl-Anthony Towns (12)	Mike Conley (6)	Frost Bank Center; 18,354	6–2
9	November 12	@ Golden State	W 116–110	Anthony Edwards (33)	Karl-Anthony Towns (14)	Mike Conley (9)	Chase Center; 18,064	7–2
10	November 14	@ Golden State	W 104–101	Karl-Anthony Towns (33)	Rudy Gobert (13)	Mike Conley (8)	Chase Center; 18,064	8–2
11	November 15	@ Phoenix	L 115–133	Karl-Anthony Towns (25)	Rudy Gobert (8)	Anthony Edwards (4)	Footprint Center; 17,071	8–3
12	November 18	@ New Orleans	W 121–120	Karl-Anthony Towns (29)	Rudy Gobert (11)	Karl-Anthony Towns (9)	Smoothie King Center; 15,536	9–3
13	November 20	New York	W 117–100	Anthony Edwards (23)	Anthony Edwards (10)	Anderson, Conley, Edwards (5)	Target Center; 18,024	10–3
14	November 22	Philadelphia	W 112–99	Anthony Edwards (31)	Gobert, Towns (11)	Mike Conley (8)	Target Center; 18,024	11–3
15	November 24	Sacramento	L 111–124	Anthony Edwards (35)	Gobert, Towns (11)	Mike Conley (9)	Target Center; 18,024	11–4
16	November 26	@ Memphis	W 119–97	Anthony Edwards (24)	Karl-Anthony Towns (8)	Mike Conley (10)	FedExForum; 15,764	12–4
17	November 28	Oklahoma City	W 106–103	Anthony Edwards (21)	Rudy Gobert (16)	Mike Conley (8)	Target Center; 18,024	13–4
18	November 30	Utah	W 101–90	Karl-Anthony Towns (32)	Rudy Gobert (13)	Alexander-Walker, Conley (7)	Target Center; 18,024	14–4

December: 10–3 (home: 5–0; road: 5–3)

Game	Date	Team	Score	High points	High rebounds	High assists	Location Attendance	Record
19	December 2	@ Charlotte	W 123–117	Karl-Anthony Towns (28)	Rudy Gobert (12)	Mike Conley (10)	Spectrum Center; 17,731	15–4
20	December 6	San Antonio	W 102–94	Mike Conley (18)	Rudy Gobert (20)	Anthony Edwards (6)	Target Center; 18,024	16–4
21	December 8	@ Memphis	W 127–103	Karl-Anthony Towns (24)	Rudy Gobert (20)	Mike Conley (7)	FedExForum; 15,577	17–4
22	December 11	@ New Orleans	L 107–121	Conley, Reid, Towns (17)	Karl-Anthony Towns (12)	Mike Conley (7)	Smoothie King Center; 16,487	17–5
23	December 14	@ Dallas	W 119–101	Naz Reid (27)	Karl-Anthony Towns (17)	Anthony Edwards (11)	American Airlines Center; 20,177	18–5
24	December 16	Indiana	W 127–109	Karl-Anthony Towns (40)	Karl-Anthony Towns (12)	Kyle Anderson (10)	Target Center; 18,024	19–5
25	December 18	@ Miami	W 112–108	Anthony Edwards (32)	Rudy Gobert (16)	Mike Conley (6)	Kaseya Center; 19,819	20–5
26	December 20	@ Philadelphia	L 113–127	Anthony Edwards (27)	Karl-Anthony Towns (13)	Anthony Edwards (5)	Wells Fargo Center; 20,365	20–6
27	December 21	L.A. Lakers	W 118–111	Anthony Edwards (27)	Rudy Gobert (13)	Mike Conley (8)	Target Center; 18,024	21–6
28	December 23	@ Sacramento	W 110–98	Anthony Edwards (34)	Rudy Gobert (17)	Anthony Edwards (10)	Golden 1 Center; 17,983	22–6
29	December 26	@ Oklahoma City	L 106–129	Anthony Edwards (25)	Edwards, Reid (7)	Anthony Edwards (6)	Paycom Center; 18,203	22–7
30	December 28	Dallas	W 118–110	Anthony Edwards (44)	Rudy Gobert (11)	Mike Conley (6)	Target Center; 18,024	23–7
31	December 30	L.A. Lakers	W 108–106	Anthony Edwards (31)	Rudy Gobert (13)	Anderson, Conley (7)	Target Center; 18,024	24–7

January: 10–7 (home: 4–3; road: 6–4)

Game	Date	Team	Score	High points	High rebounds	High assists	Location Attendance	Record
32	January 1	@ New York	L 106–112	Anthony Edwards (35)	Rudy Gobert (15)	Mike Conley (5)	Madison Square Garden; 19,812	24–8
33	January 3	New Orleans	L 106–117	Anthony Edwards (35)	Towns, Reid (6)	Mike Conley (9)	Target Center; 18,024	24–9
34	January 5	@ Houston	W 122–95	Anthony Edwards (24)	Rudy Gobert (12)	Karl-Anthony Towns (6)	Toyota Center; 18,055	25–9
35	January 7	@ Dallas	L 108–115	Anthony Edwards (36)	Rudy Gobert (17)	Mike Conley (7)	American Airlines Center; 20,111	25–10
36	January 9	@ Orlando	W 113–92	Karl-Anthony Towns (28)	Rudy Gobert (12)	Mike Conley (10)	Kia Center; 19,223	26–10
37	January 10	@ Boston	L 120–127 (OT)	Anthony Edwards (29)	Karl-Anthony Towns (13)	Karl-Anthony Towns (6)	TD Garden; 19,156	26–11
38	January 12	Portland	W 116–93	Rudy Gobert (24)	Rudy Gobert (17)	Mike Conley (10)	Target Center; 18,024	27–11
39	January 14	L.A. Clippers	W 109–105	Anthony Edwards (33)	Rudy Gobert (18)	Anthony Edwards (6)	Target Center; 18,024	28–11
40	January 17	@ Detroit	W 124–117	Edwards, Towns (27)	Rudy Gobert (16)	Kyle Anderson (9)	Little Caesars Arena; 16,022	29–11
41	January 18	Memphis	W 118–103	Anthony Edwards (28)	Rudy Gobert (10)	Mike Conley (10)	Target Center; 18,024	30–11
42	January 20	Oklahoma City	L 97–102	Edwards, Towns (19)	Rudy Gobert (18)	Anthony Edwards (5)	Target Center; 18,024	30–12
43	January 22	Charlotte	L 125–128	Karl-Anthony Towns (62)	Rudy Gobert (11)	Anthony Edwards (11)	Target Center; 18,024	30–13
44	January 24	@ Washington	W 118–107	Anthony Edwards (38)	Rudy Gobert (16)	three players (5)	Capital One Arena; 15,446	31–13
45	January 25	@ Brooklyn	W 96–94	Karl-Anthony Towns (27)	Rudy Gobert (13)	Kyle Anderson (5)	Barclays Center; 17,732	32–13
46	January 27	@ San Antonio	L 112–113	Anthony Edwards (32)	Rudy Gobert (7)	Anthony Edwards (12)	Frost Bank Center; 17,726	32–14
47	January 29	@ Oklahoma City	W 107–101	Anthony Edwards (27)	Rudy Gobert (18)	Karl-Anthony Towns (6)	Paycom Center; 16,870	33–14
48	January 31	Dallas	W 121–87	Karl-Anthony Towns (29)	Karl-Anthony Towns (9)	Edwards, McLaughlin (5)	Target Center; 18,024	34–14

February: 8–3 (home: 4–2; road: 4–1)

Game	Date	Team	Score	High points	High rebounds	High assists	Location Attendance	Record
49	February 2	Orlando	L 106–108	Edwards, Gobert (22)	Rudy Gobert (16)	Mike Conley (9)	Target Center; 18,024	34–15
50	February 4	Houston	W 111–90	Anthony Edwards (32)	Rudy Gobert (13)	Mike Conley (9)	Target Center; 18,024	35–15
51	February 6	@ Chicago	L 123–129 (OT)	Anthony Edwards (38)	Rudy Gobert (16)	Mike Conley (8)	United Center; 20,949	35–16
52	February 8	@ Milwaukee	W 129–105	Anthony Edwards (26)	Rudy Gobert (11)	Conley, Edwards (9)	Fiserv Forum; 17,577	36–16
53	February 12	@ L.A. Clippers	W 121–100	Karl-Anthony Towns (24)	Rudy Gobert (11)	Anthony Edwards (8)	Crypto.com Arena; 19,370	37–16
54	February 13	@ Portland	W 121–109	Anthony Edwards (41)	Rudy Gobert (15)	Kyle Anderson (8)	Moda Center; 17,906	38–16
55	February 15	@ Portland	W 128–91	Anthony Edwards (34)	Rudy Gobert (12)	Anthony Edwards (7)	Moda Center; 18,606	39–16
All-Star Game
56	February 23	Milwaukee	L 107–112	Anthony Edwards (28)	Rudy Gobert (19)	Kyle Anderson (6)	Target Center; 18,024	39–17
57	February 24	Brooklyn	W 101–86	Anthony Edwards (29)	Anderson, Reid, Towns (9)	Morris, Towns (4)	Target Center; 18,024	40–17
58	February 27	San Antonio	W 114–105	Anthony Edwards (34)	Rudy Gobert (17)	Nickeil Alexander-Walker (6)	Target Center; 18,024	41–17
59	February 28	Memphis	W 110–101	Anthony Edwards (34)	Karl-Anthony Towns (11)	Mike Conley (7)	Target Center; 18,024	42–17

March: 9–6 (home: 4–4; road: 5–2)

Game	Date	Team	Score	High points	High rebounds	High assists	Location Attendance	Record
60	March 1	Sacramento	L 120–124 (OT)	Jaden McDaniels (26)	Rudy Gobert (16)	Mike Conley (8)	Target Center; 18,024	42–18
61	March 3	L.A. Clippers	L 88–89	Anthony Edwards (27)	Rudy Gobert (16)	Karl-Anthony Towns (8)	Target Center; 18,024	42–19
62	March 4	Portland	W 119–114	Rudy Gobert (25)	Rudy Gobert (16)	Conley, Morris (7)	Target Center; 18,024	43–19
63	March 7	@ Indiana	W 113–111	Anthony Edwards (44)	Rudy Gobert (14)	Jaden McDaniels (6)	Gainbridge Fieldhouse; 16,580	44–19
64	March 8	@ Cleveland	L 104–113 (OT)	Naz Reid (34)	Rudy Gobert (17)	Anderson, Conley (5)	Rocket Mortgage FieldHouse; 19,433	44–20
65	March 10	@ L.A. Lakers	L 109–120	Edwards, Reid (25)	Alexander-Walker, Edwards (7)	Anthony Edwards (7)	Crypto.com Arena; 18,997	44–21
66	March 12	@ L.A. Clippers	W 118–100	Anthony Edwards (37)	Rudy Gobert (11)	Kyle Anderson (7)	Crypto.com Arena; 19,370	45–21
67	March 16	@ Utah	W 119–100	Anthony Edwards (31)	Naz Reid (12)	Kyle Anderson (9)	Delta Center; 18,206	46–21
68	March 18	@ Utah	W 114–104	Anthony Edwards (32)	Jaden McDaniels (8)	Anthony Edwards (8)	Delta Center; 18,206	47–21
69	March 19	Denver	L 112–115	Anthony Edwards (30)	Anthony Edwards (8)	Anthony Edwards (8)	Target Center; 18,024	47–22
70	March 22	Cleveland	W 104–91	Mike Conley (21)	Rudy Gobert (15)	Mike Conley (6)	Target Center; 18,024	48–22
71	March 24	Golden State	W 114–110	Anthony Edwards (23)	Gobert, Reid (12)	Anthony Edwards (8)	Target Center; 18,024	49–22
72	March 27	Detroit	W 106–91	Naz Reid (21)	Rudy Gobert (14)	Mike Conley (7)	Target Center; 18,024	50–22
73	March 29	@ Denver	W 111–98	Anthony Edwards (25)	Rudy Gobert (12)	Mike Conley (8)	Ball Arena; 19,844	51–22
74	March 31	Chicago	L 101–109	Anthony Edwards (22)	Anthony Edwards (11)	Mike Conley (7)	Target Center; 18,024	51–23

April: 5–3 (home: 4–1; road: 1–2)

Game	Date	Team	Score	High points	High rebounds	High assists	Location Attendance	Record
75	April 2	Houston	W 113–106	Naz Reid (25)	Rudy Gobert (14)	Kyle Anderson (9)	Target Center; 18,024	52–23
76	April 3	Toronto	W 133–85	Anthony Edwards (28)	Rudy Gobert (15)	Anthony Edwards (6)	Target Center; 18,024	53–23
77	April 5	@ Phoenix	L 87–97	Anthony Edwards (17)	Naz Reid (11)	Anderson, Conley, Edwards, Morris (3)	Footprint Center; 17,071	53–24
78	April 7	@ L.A. Lakers	W 127–117	Naz Reid (31)	Rudy Gobert (16)	Anthony Edwards (8)	Crypto.com Arena; 18,997	54–24
79	April 9	Washington	W 130–121	Anthony Edwards (51)	Rudy Gobert (16)	Edwards, McLaughlin (7)	Target Center; 18,024	55–24
80	April 10	@ Denver	L 107–116	Anthony Edwards (25)	Rudy Gobert (15)	Anthony Edwards (4)	Ball Arena; 19,845	55–25
81	April 12	Atlanta	W 109–106	Rudy Gobert (25)	Rudy Gobert (19)	Mike Conley (10)	Target Center; 18,024	56–25
82	April 14	Phoenix	L 106–125	Rudy Gobert (21)	Rudy Gobert (7)	Anderson, Edwards, Morris (4)	Target Center; 18,024	56–26

2023–24 season schedule

=== Playoffs ===
2024 playoff game log
Total: 9–7 (home: 3–5; road: 6–2)
First Round: 4–0 (home: 2–0; road: 2–0)

Game	Date	Team	Score	High points	High rebounds	High assists	Location Attendance	Series
1	April 20	Phoenix	W 120–95	Anthony Edwards (33)	Rudy Gobert (16)	Mike Conley (7)	Target Center; 19,478	1–0
2	April 23	Phoenix	W 105–93	Jaden McDaniels (25)	Rudy Gobert (9)	Anthony Edwards (8)	Target Center; 19,310	2–0
3	April 26	@ Phoenix	W 126–109	Anthony Edwards (36)	Rudy Gobert (14)	Mike Conley (7)	Footprint Center; 17,071	3–0
4	April 28	@ Phoenix	W 122–116	Anthony Edwards (40)	Karl-Anthony Towns (10)	Mike Conley (7)	Footprint Center; 17,071	4–0

Conference Semifinals: 4–3 (home: 1–2; road: 3–1)

Game	Date	Team	Score	High points	High rebounds	High assists	Location Attendance	Series
1	May 4	@ Denver	W 106–99	Anthony Edwards (43)	Rudy Gobert (13)	Mike Conley (10)	Ball Arena; 19,915	1–0
2	May 6	@ Denver	W 106–80	Edwards, Towns (27)	Karl-Anthony Towns (12)	Kyle Anderson (8)	Ball Arena; 19,942	2–0
3	May 10	Denver	L 90–117	Anthony Edwards (19)	Conley, Edwards (6)	Mike Conley (6)	Target Center; 19,733	2–1
4	May 12	Denver	L 107–115	Anthony Edwards (44)	Rudy Gobert (14)	Mike Conley (9)	Target Center; 19,583	2–2
5	May 14	@ Denver	L 97–112	Karl-Anthony Towns (23)	Rudy Gobert (11)	Anthony Edwards (9)	Ball Arena; 19,992	2–3
6	May 16	Denver	W 115–70	Anthony Edwards (27)	Rudy Gobert (14)	Conley, Towns (5)	Target Center; 19,187	3–3
7	May 19	@ Denver	W 98–90	McDaniels, Towns (23)	Karl-Anthony Towns (12)	Anthony Edwards (7)	Ball Arena; 20,022	4–3

Conference Finals: 1–4 (home: 0–3; road: 1–1)

Game	Date	Team	Score	High points	High rebounds	High assists	Location Attendance	Series
1	May 22	Dallas	L 105–108	Jaden McDaniels (24)	Anthony Edwards (11)	Anthony Edwards (8)	Target Center; 19,433	0–1
2	May 24	Dallas	L 108–109	Naz Reid (23)	Rudy Gobert (10)	Anthony Edwards (7)	Target Center; 19,636	0–2
3	May 26	@ Dallas	L 107–116	Anthony Edwards (26)	Karl-Anthony Towns (11)	Anthony Edwards (9)	American Airlines Center; 20,511	0–3
4	May 28	@ Dallas	W 105–100	Anthony Edwards (29)	Edwards, Gobert (10)	Anthony Edwards (9)	American Airlines Center; 20,477	1–3
5	May 30	Dallas	L 103–124	Edwards, Towns (28)	Karl-Anthony Towns (12)	Anthony Edwards (6)	Target Center; 19,333	1–4

2024 playoff schedule

=== In-Season Tournament ===
This was the first regular season in which all NBA teams competed in a mid-season tournament setting, due to the implementation of the 2023 NBA In-Season Tournament. During the in-season tournament period, the Timberwolves competed in Group C of the Western Conference, which included the Sacramento Kings, Golden State Warriors, Oklahoma City Thunder, and San Antonio Spurs.

After defeating the Spurs and Warriors in their first two In-Season Tournament games, the Wolves lost their third game to the Sacramento Kings, which moved the Kings to first within Group C, clinching a spot in the knockout stage. The Timberwolves were left competing for the wild card with the Phoenix Suns, but ended up falling short due to the point differential tiebreaker. The Timberwolves' overall record in group play was 3–1, good enough for second in the group.

==== West group C ====
Pos	Team	Pld	W	L	PF	PA	PD	Qualification	SAC	MIN	GSW	OKC	SAS
1	Sacramento Kings	4	4	0	482	452	+30	Advance to knockout stage	—	124–111	124–123	105–98	129–120
2	Minnesota Timberwolves	4	3	1	438	438	0		111–124	—	104–101	106–103	117–110
3	Golden State Warriors	4	2	2	483	479	+4		123–124	101–104	—	141–139	118–112
4	Oklahoma City Thunder	4	1	3	463	439	+24		98–105	103–106	139–141	—	123–87
5	San Antonio Spurs	4	0	4	429	487	−58		120–129	110–117	112–118	87–123	—

Source: NBA
Rules for classification: Tiebreakers

== Player statistics ==
=== Regular season ===
Player	POS	GP	GS	MP	REB	AST	STL	BLK	PTS	MPG	RPG	APG	SPG	BPG	PPG
Nickeil Alexander-Walker	SG	82	20	1,921	167	204	64	42	655	23.4	2.0	2.5	.8	.5	8.0
Naz Reid	C	81	14	1,964	423	106	63	73	1,090	24.2	5.2	1.3	.8	.9	13.5
Anthony Edwards	SG	79	78	2,770	430	405	101	42	2,049	35.1	5.4	5.1	1.3	.5	25.9
Kyle Anderson	PF	79	10	1,782	273	331	71	47	506	22.6	3.5	4.2	.9	.6	6.4
Rudy Gobert	C	76	76	2,593	982	102	52	162	1,061	34.1	12.9	1.3	.7	2.1	14.0
Mike Conley Jr.	PG	76	76	2,193	218	449	88	17	869	28.9	2.9	5.9	1.2	.2	11.4
Jaden McDaniels	SF	72	71	2,105	224	101	63	42	757	29.2	3.1	1.4	.9	.6	10.5
Karl-Anthony Towns	PF	62	62	2,026	515	189	43	41	1,349	32.7	8.3	3.0	.7	.7	21.8
Jordan McLaughlin	PG	56	0	626	72	110	35	7	195	11.2	1.3	2.0	.6	.1	3.5
Shake Milton^{†}	SG	38	0	491	51	50	16	5	178	12.9	1.3	1.3	.4	.1	4.7
Troy Brown Jr.^{†}	SF	37	3	410	72	35	8	2	154	11.1	1.9	.9	.2	.1	4.2
Josh Minott	SF	32	0	91	17	8	5	5	50	2.8	.5	.3	.2	.2	1.6
Monté Morris^{†}	PG	27	0	408	45	61	18	8	137	15.1	1.7	2.3	.7	.3	5.1
Luka Garza	C	25	0	122	31	4	4	1	99	4.9	1.2	.2	.2	.0	4.0
Wendell Moore Jr.	SG	25	0	75	12	6	5	1	18	3.0	.5	.2	.2	.0	.7
Leonard Miller	SF	17	0	52	20	8	2	1	29	3.1	1.2	.5	.1	.1	1.7
Daishen Nix	PG	15	0	50	3	6	5	0	27	3.3	.2	.4	.3	.0	1.8
T. J. Warren	SF	11	0	125	22	9	4	1	41	11.4	2.0	.8	.4	.1	3.7
Justin Jackson	SF	2	0	1	0	0	0	0	0	.5	.0	.0	.0	.0	.0

- ^{†} Denotes player spent time with another team in the season. Stats reflect time with the Timberwolves only.

=== Playoffs ===
Player	POS	GP	GS	MP	REB	AST	STL	BLK	PTS	MPG	RPG	APG	SPG	BPG	PPG
Anthony Edwards	SG	16	16	649	112	104	24	9	441	40.6	7.0	6.5	1.5	.6	27.6
Jaden McDaniels	SF	16	16	537	61	18	14	18	195	33.6	3.8	1.1	.9	1.1	12.2
Karl-Anthony Towns	PF	16	16	522	144	42	12	3	305	32.6	9.0	2.6	.8	.2	19.1
Nickeil Alexander-Walker	SG	16	1	378	28	37	10	7	116	23.6	1.8	2.3	.6	.4	7.3
Naz Reid	C	16	0	361	59	16	8	12	177	22.6	3.7	1.0	.5	.8	11.1
Rudy Gobert	C	15	15	512	147	24	14	15	181	34.1	9.8	1.6	.9	1.0	12.1
Mike Conley Jr.	PG	15	15	474	58	86	21	3	174	31.6	3.9	5.7	1.4	.2	11.6
Kyle Anderson	PF	15	1	231	40	38	10	5	64	15.4	2.7	2.5	.7	.3	4.3
Monté Morris	PG	9	0	67	6	9	2	1	21	7.4	.7	1.0	.2	.1	2.3
Luka Garza	C	7	0	26	6	1	0	0	29	3.7	.9	.1	.0	.0	4.1
Jordan McLaughlin	PG	6	0	30	4	2	0	0	4	5.0	.7	.3	.0	.0	.7
Wendell Moore Jr.	SG	6	0	18	2	2	1	0	7	3.0	.3	.3	.2	.0	1.2
Josh Minott	SF	5	0	18	5	3	0	0	6	3.6	1.0	.6	.0	.0	1.2
T. J. Warren	SF	3	0	11	3	1	0	0	0	3.7	1.0	.3	.0	.0	.0
Leonard Miller	SF	3	0	7	4	0	0	0	0	2.3	1.3	.0	.0	.0	.0

== Transactions ==
=== Trades ===
June 23, 2023	To Minnesota Timberwolves Draft rights to Leonard Miller (No. 33)	To San Antonio Spurs 2026 UTA second-round pick 2028 MIN second-round pick
February 8, 2024	Minnesota Timberwolves Monté Morris	To Detroit Pistons Troy Brown Jr. Shake Milton; 2030 second-round pick

=== Free agency ===
==== Re-signed ====
Date	Player	Signed	Ref.
June 25	Naz Reid	3 years $42M	
June 30	Nickeil Alexander-Walker	2-year deal	
July 3	Anthony Edwards	5 years $260M	
October 23	Jaden McDaniels	5 years $136M	

==== Additions ====
Date	Player	Contract terms	Former Team	Ref.
June 30	Troy Brown Jr.	2 years $10M	Los Angeles Lakers	
June 30	Shake Milton	2 years $10M	Philadelphia 76ers	

==== Subtractions ====
Date	Player	Reason	New Team	Ref.
July 1	Taurean Prince	1 year $4.5M	Los Angeles Lakers	
