= Wendell Moore Jr. =

American basketball player (born 2001)

- Moore with Virtus Bologna in 2026

No. 8 – Virtus Bologna
- Position: Small forward / shooting guard
- League: LBA; EuroLeague

Personal information
- Born: September 18, 2001 (age 25) Richmond, Virginia, U.S.
- Listed height: 6 ft 5 in (1.96 m)
- Listed weight: 215 lb (98 kg)

Career information
- High school: Cox Mill (Concord, North Carolina)
- College: Duke (2019–2022)
- NBA draft: 2022: 1st round, 26th overall pick
- Drafted by: Dallas Mavericks
- Playing career: 2022–present

Career history
- 2022–2024: Minnesota Timberwolves
- 2022–2024: →Iowa Wolves
- 2024–2025: Detroit Pistons
- 2025: Charlotte Hornets
- 2025: →Greensboro Swarm
- 2025: Maine Celtics
- 2025–2026: Detroit Pistons
- 2025–2026: →Motor City Cruise
- 2026–present: Virtus Bologna

Career highlights
- Julius Erving Award (2022); ACC All-Defensive Team (2022); Second-team All-ACC (2022); McDonald's All-American (2019); Nike Hoop Summit (2019); North Carolina Mr. Basketball (2019)
- Stats at NBA.com
- Stats at Basketball Reference
Medals
Men's basketball
Representing the United States
FIBA Under-17 World Cup
Gold medal – first place	2018 Argentina	Team
FIBA Under-16 Americas Championship
Gold medal – first place	2017 Argentina	Team

Wendell Horace Moore Jr. (/wɛnˈdɛl/ wen-DEL; born September 18, 2001) is an American professional basketball player for Virtus Bologna of the Lega Basket Serie A (LBA) and the EuroLeague. He played college basketball for the Duke Blue Devils.

== High school career ==
Moore attended Cox Mill High School in Concord, North Carolina. As a freshman in 2015–16, he started in all 29 games played and averaged 17.9 points, 8.6 rebounds, 3.3 assists and 1.8 steals to help his team to a 22–8 record and a sectional championship. As a sophomore in 2016–17, he started in all 33 games and averaged 25.0 points, 9.2 rebounds, 3.9 assists and 2.3 steals to help his team to a 27–6 record and a 3A state title. As a junior in 2017–18, he became the fastest player to score 1,000 career points in Cabarrus County public school history; averaged 25.4 points, 7.3 rebounds, 2.9 assists and 2.3 steals to help his team to a 29–3 record and a second straight 3A state title.

=== Recruiting ===
On October 8, 2018, Moore announced that he would attend Duke University and play for the Blue Devils during the 2019–20 season. Moore picked the Blue Devils over North Carolina, NC State, South Carolina and Wake Forest.

College recruiting
Name	Hometown	School	Height	Weight	Commit date
Wendell Moore; SF	Charlotte, NC	Cox Mill (NC)	6 ft 6 in (1.98 m)	215 lb (98 kg)	Oct 8, 2018
Wendell Moore; SF	Recruit ratings: Rivals: 247Sports: ESPN: (93)				
Overall recruit ranking: Rivals: 24 247Sports: 38 ESPN: 22
Note: In many cases, Scout, Rivals, 247Sports, On3, and ESPN may conflict in their listings of height and weight.; In these cases, the average was taken. ESPN grades are on a 100-point scale.; Sources: "Duke 2019 Basketball Commitments". Rivals.; "2019 Duke Blue Devils Recruiting Class". ESPN.; "2019 Team Ranking". Rivals.

== College career ==
Moore scored 17 points in an 81–73 win over Georgetown in the finals of the 2K Classic. He suffered a broken hand in a win against Miami (Florida) on January 4, 2020, which required surgery. After missing six games, Moore returned to action on February 1 in a win against Syracuse. On February 8, Moore scored 17 points and had 10 rebounds in a rivalry game against North Carolina. He hit a putback shot after a Tre Jones miss to give the Blue Devils a 98–96 win. Moore scored a career-high 25 points on February 25, in a 113–101 loss to Wake Forest. He averaged 7.4 points, 4.2 rebounds and 1.9 assists per game as a freshman. As a sophomore, Moore averaged 9.7 points, 4.8 rebounds, 2.7 assists and 1.2 steals per game. He was named to the Second Team All-ACC as a junior, as well as the All-Defensive Team. On November 12, 2021, Moore recorded 19 points, 10 rebounds and 10 assists, making him the fifth player in Blue Devils history with a triple-double. On April 2, 2022, Moore was named the winner of the Julius Erving Award. He declared for the 2022 NBA draft and forgoed his college eligibility on April 21.

== Professional career ==
=== Minnesota Timberwolves (2022–2024) ===
Moore was selected by the Dallas Mavericks with the 26th overall pick in the 2022 NBA draft, and then traded to the Houston Rockets as part of a trade involving Christian Wood, and then again to the Minnesota Timberwolves in exchange for the 29th overall pick TyTy Washington Jr. and two future second-round picks.

=== Detroit Pistons (2024–2025) ===
On July 6, 2024, Moore was traded to the Detroit Pistons alongside the 37th overall pick in the 2024 NBA draft in exchange for the 53rd pick in the draft and some cleared salary. He made 20 appearances (one start) for Detroit during the 2024–25 NBA season, averaging 3.2 points, 2.2 rebounds, and 1.2 assists. On February 6, 2025, Moore was waived.

=== Charlotte Hornets (2025) ===
On February 15, 2025, Moore signed a two-way contract with the Charlotte Hornets. He made 16 appearances for the Hornets, averaging 5.4 points, 3.2 rebounds, and 1.2 assists.

=== Maine Celtics (2025) ===
Moore was a training camp participant for the Boston Celtics ahead of the 2025–26 NBA season, but was waived as part of final roster cuts on October 16, 2025. He signed with the Celtics' NBA G League affiliates, the Maine Celtics, for the 2025–26 season.

=== Second stint with Pistons (2025–2026) ===
On November 10, 2025, Moore signed a two-way contract with the Detroit Pistons.

=== Virtus Bologna (2026–present) ===
On July 28, 2026, Moore signed with Virtus Bologna of the Lega Basket Serie A (LBA) and the EuroLeague.

== National team career ==
In July 2018, Moore played for the United States in the FIBA Under-17 Basketball World Cup, where his team won the Cup.

== Career statistics ==
Legend
GP	Games played	GS	Games started	MPG	Minutes per game
FG%	Field goal percentage	3P%	3-point field goal percentage	FT%	Free throw percentage
RPG	Rebounds per game	APG	Assists per game	SPG	Steals per game
BPG	Blocks per game	PPG	Points per game	**Bold**	Career high

=== NBA ===
==== Regular season ====
Year	Team	GP	GS	MPG	FG%	3P%	FT%	RPG	APG	SPG	BPG	PPG
2022–23	Minnesota	**29**	**2**	5.3	.419	.118	.800	.6	.6	.3	.2	1.4
2023–24	Minnesota	25	0	3.0	.500	.000	—	.5	.2	.2	.0	.7
2024–25	Detroit	20	1	10.9	.460	.286	.929	2.2	**1.2**	.5	.2	3.2
2024–25	Charlotte	16	0	**17.5**	.474	**.370**	.625	**3.2**	**1.2**	**.6**	.1	**5.4**
2025–26	Detroit	6	0	10.0	**.571**	.000	**1.000**	1.0	.7	.3	**.3**	1.7
Career		96	3	8.2	.464	.246	.828	1.4	.7	.4	.1	2.3

==== Playoffs ====
Year	Team	GP	GS	MPG	FG%	3P%	FT%	RPG	APG	SPG	BPG	PPG
2023	Minnesota	1	0	2.1	—	—	—	.0	.0	.0	.0	.0
2024	Minnesota	**6**	0	**3.1**	.429	.250	—	**.3**	**.3**	**.2**	.0	**1.2**
Career		7	0	2.9	.429	.250	—	.3	.3	.1	.0	1.0

=== College ===
Year	Team	GP	GS	MPG	FG%	3P%	FT%	RPG	APG	SPG	BPG	PPG
2019–20	Duke	25	11	24.0	.416	.211	.806	4.2	1.9	.9	**.2**	7.4
2020–21	Duke	24	18	27.6	.417	.301	**.848**	4.8	2.7	1.2	**.2**	9.7
2021–22	Duke	**39**	**39**	**33.9**	**.500**	**.413**	.805	**5.3**	**4.4**	**1.4**	**.2**	**13.4**
Career		88	68	29.4	.459	.358	.814	4.9	3.2	1.2	.2	10.7
