= Jordan McLaughlin =

American basketball player (born 1996)

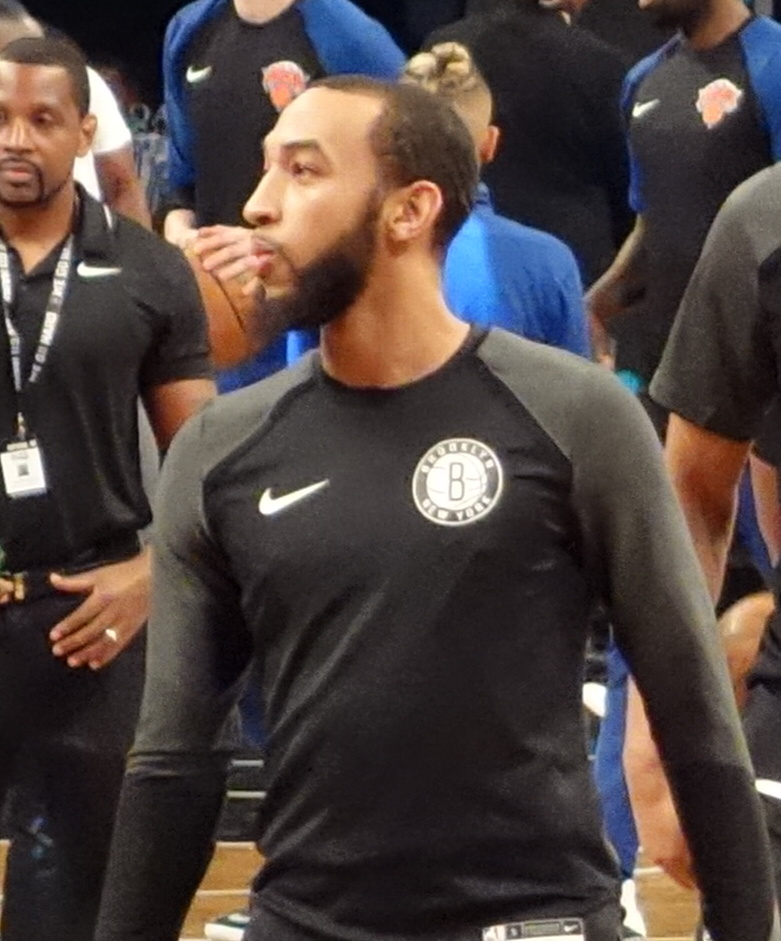
- McLaughlin with the Brooklyn Nets in 2018

No. 0 – San Antonio Spurs
- Position: Point guard
- League: NBA

Personal information
- Born: April 9, 1996 (age 30) Pasadena, California, U.S.
- Listed height: 5 ft 11 in (1.80 m)
- Listed weight: 185 lb (84 kg)

Career information
- High school: Etiwanda (Rancho Cucamonga, California)
- College: USC (2014–2018)
- NBA draft: 2018: undrafted
- Playing career: 2018–present

Career history
- 2018–2019: Long Island Nets
- 2019–2024: Minnesota Timberwolves
- 2019–2020: →Iowa Wolves
- 2024–2025: Sacramento Kings
- 2025–present: San Antonio Spurs

Career highlights
- First-team All-Pac-12 (2018)
- Stats at NBA.com
- Stats at Basketball Reference

Jordan McLaughlin (born April 9, 1996) is an American professional basketball player for the San Antonio Spurs of the National Basketball Association (NBA). He played college basketball for the USC Trojans.

== High school career ==
McLaughlin is the son of Thomas McLaughlin, who played minor league baseball, and has an older sister, Amber. Growing up, Jordan played baseball and football but gravitated towards basketball. McLaughlin attended Etiwanda High School in Rancho Cucamonga, California. He scored 19 points in the 2013 Chicago Elite Classic. He committed to the USC Trojans over scholarship offers from Kansas and UCLA. USC coach Andy Enfield made him a recruiting priority after seeing him at an AAU game. McLaughlin had previously crossed USC off his list after seeing former coach Kevin O'Neill berate an injured player at a practice.

== College career ==
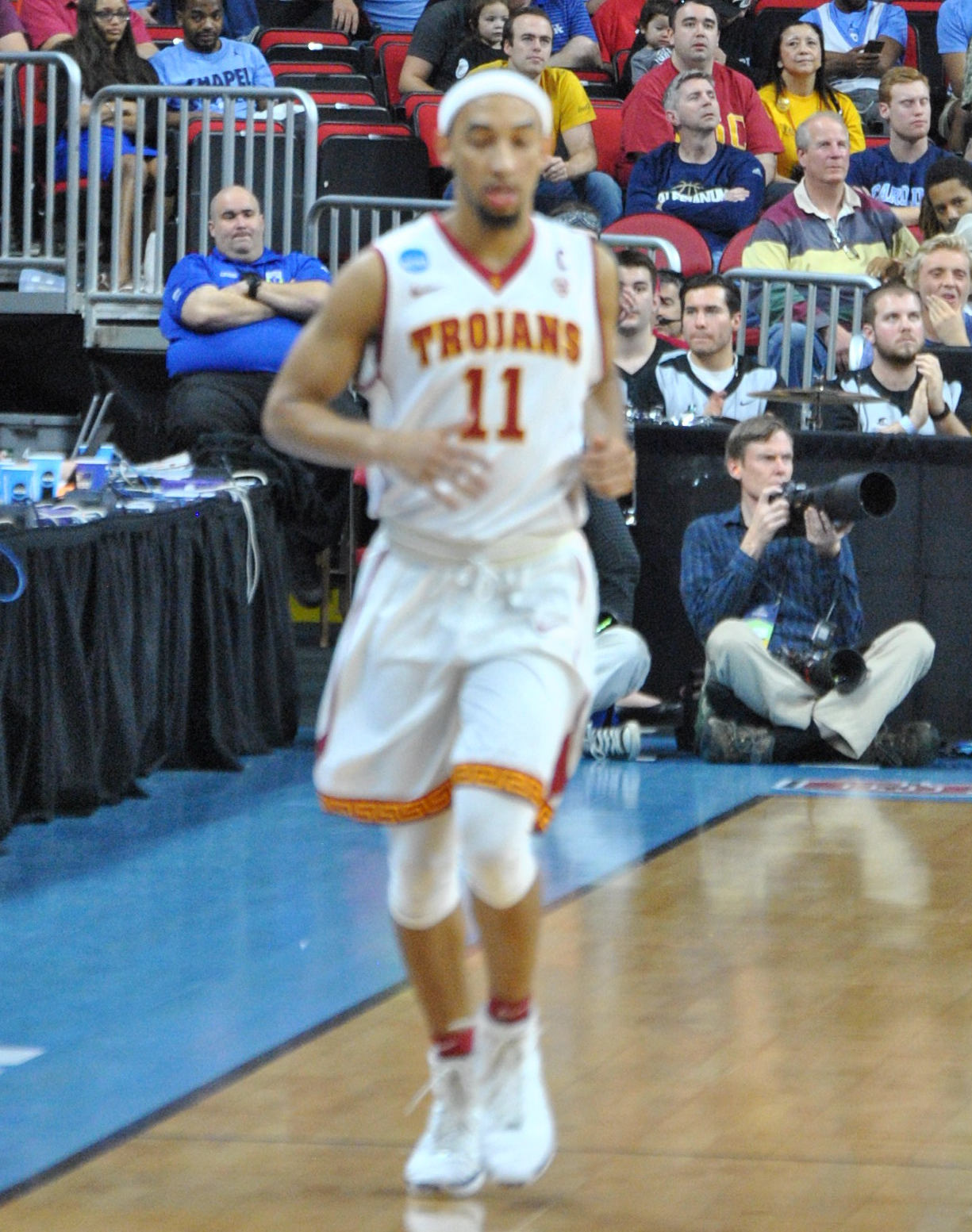
McLaughlin with the USC Trojans in 2016

In his freshman season, USC won 12 games. He averaged 12.1 points and 4.5 assists per game but missed the end of the season with a shoulder injury. McLaughlin led USC to the NCAA Tournament in 2016, and averaged 13.4 points per game on 47 percent shooting. He led the team back to the NCAA tournament in 2017, posting 12.9 points, 3.6 rebounds and 5.5 assists per game. Coming into his senior year, he was named to the preseason Bob Cousy Award Watchlist. As a senior at USC, McLaughlin averaged 12.8 points, 7.8 assists, 3.7 rebounds and 2.0 steals in 35.3 minutes per game, shooting 39.7 percent from behind the arc. He was a First Team All-Pac-12 selection. McLaughlin was named to the All-District IX Team by the USBWA and First Team All-District 20 by the NABC. His assists per game was the third highest in Division I, and McLaughlin was the third Pac-12 player ever to record more than 600 assists and 1,600 points over a career.

== Professional career ==
=== Long Island Nets (2018–2019) ===
After going undrafted in the 2018 NBA draft, McLaughlin signed with the Brooklyn Nets for NBA summer league play. He was also invited to training camp. He scored seven points and six assists in 90–76 summer league loss to the Oklahoma City Thunder on July 7. McLaughlin later joined the Nets on a training camp deal. He was waived by the Nets on October 11, but was signed to the training camp roster of the Nets’ NBA G League affiliate, the Long Island Nets.

=== Minnesota Timberwolves (2019–2024) ===
On July 20, 2019, McLaughlin signed a two-way contract with the Minnesota Timberwolves. On February 8, 2020, he recorded a career-high in points (24) and assists (11) against the Los Angeles Clippers. McLaughlin made 30 appearances (including two starts) for Minnesota as a rookie, averaging 7.6 points, 1.6 rebounds, and 4.2 assists. McLaughlin made 51 appearances (including two starts) for the Timberwolves during the 2020–21 NBA season, recording averages of 5.0 points, 2.1 rebounds, and 3.8 assists.

On September 15, 2021, McLaughlin signed a standard contract with Minnesota. He made 62 appearances for Minnesota during the 2021–22 season, averaging 3.8 points, 1.5 rebounds, and 2.9 assists. McLaughlin appeared in 43 games for the Timberwolves in the 2022–23 season, recording averages of 3.7 points, 1.4 rebounds, and 3.4 rebounds.

McLaughlin made 56 appearances for the Timberwolves during the 2023–24 NBA season, posting averages of 3.5 points, 1.3 rebounds, and 2.0 assists.

=== Sacramento Kings (2024–2025) ===
On July 10, 2024, McLaughlin signed with the Sacramento Kings. McLaughlin made 28 appearances for Sacramento in the 2024–25 season, averaging 1.9 points, 0.8 rebounds, and 0.9 assists.

=== San Antonio Spurs (2025–present) ===
On February 3, 2025, McLaughlin was traded, alongside De'Aaron Fox, to the San Antonio Spurs in a three-team trade also involving the Chicago Bulls in which Zach LaVine, Sidy Cissoko, three first-round picks and two second-round picks were sent to the Kings while Zach Collins, Kevin Huerter, Tre Jones and a 2025 first-round pick went to the Bulls. In 18 games down the stretch for the team, he averaged 2.5 points and 1.5 assists.

On July 12, 2025, McLaughlin re-signed with the Spurs on a one-year, $3 million contract. He made 44 appearances for San Antonio during the 2025–26 season, recording averages of 2.0 points, 0.7 rebounds, and 0.9 assists.

On July 13, 2026, McLaughlin re–signed with San Antonio on a one–year, $3.29 million contract.

== Career statistics ==
Legend
GP	Games played	GS	Games started	MPG	Minutes per game
FG%	Field goal percentage	3P%	3-point field goal percentage	FT%	Free throw percentage
RPG	Rebounds per game	APG	Assists per game	SPG	Steals per game
BPG	Blocks per game	PPG	Points per game	**Bold**	Career high

=== NBA ===
==== Regular season ====
Year	Team	GP	GS	MPG	FG%	3P%	FT%	RPG	APG	SPG	BPG	PPG
2019–20	Minnesota	30	2	**19.7**	.489	.382	.667	1.6	**4.2**	**1.1**	.1	**7.6**
2020–21	Minnesota	51	2	18.4	.413	.359	.767	**2.1**	3.8	1.0	.1	5.0
2021–22	Minnesota	**62**	**3**	14.5	.440	.318	.750	1.5	2.9	.9	**.2**	3.8
2022–23	Minnesota	43	0	15.8	.421	.308	.833	1.4	3.4	.7	.1	3.7
2023–24	Minnesota	56	0	11.2	.483	**.472**	.722	1.3	2.0	.6	.1	3.5
2024–25	Sacramento	28	0	6.8	.364	.385	.688	.8	.9	.4	.0	1.9
2024–25	San Antonio	18	0	6.9	**.536**	.450	**1.000**	.5	1.5	.3	.1	2.5
2025–26	San Antonio	44	0	6.4	.418	.425	.857	.7	.9	.5	.0	2.0
Career		332	7	13.0	.443	.377	.747	1.3	2.5	.7	.1	3.8

==== Playoffs ====
Year	Team	GP	GS	MPG	FG%	3P%	FT%	RPG	APG	SPG	BPG	PPG
2022	Minnesota	5	0	**16.6**	**.706**	.571	.750	**2.4**	**3.4**	**1.0**	.0	**6.2**
2023	Minnesota	2	0	7.1	.000	.000	—	1.0	1.0	.0	.0	.0
2024	Minnesota	6	0	5.0	.222	.000	.000	.7	.3	.0	.0	.7
2026	San Antonio	**10**	0	4.6	.636	**.600**	**1.000**	.8	1.0	.2	.0	1.9
Career		23	0	7.5	.512	.368	.625	1.1	1.3	.3	.0	2.3

=== College ===
Year	Team	GP	GS	MPG	FG%	3P%	FT%	RPG	APG	SPG	BPG	PPG
2014–15	USC	22	21	31.6	.352	.272	.652	3.0	4.5	1.5	**.2**	12.1
2015–16	USC	34	34	32.4	**.471**	**.424**	.738	**3.8**	4.7	1.6	.1	**13.4**
2016–17	USC	**36**	**36**	34.1	.459	.402	**.798**	3.6	5.5	1.5	.1	12.9
2017–18	USC	**36**	**36**	**35.3**	.449	.397	.746	3.7	**7.8**	**2.0**	**.2**	12.8
Career		128	127	33.5	.439	.379	.738	3.5	5.8	1.7	.2	12.9
