= 2022–23 Minnesota Timberwolves season =

2022–23 NBA season by team

- Head coach: Chris Finch
- General manager: Tim Connelly
- Owner: Glen Taylor
- Arena: Target Center

Results
- Record: 42–40 (.512)
- Place: Division: 2nd (Northwest); Conference: 8th (Western)
- Playoff finish: First round (lost to Nuggets 1–4)
- Stats at Basketball Reference

Local media
- Television: Bally Sports North
- Radio: WCCO

The 2022–23 Minnesota Timberwolves season was the 34th season for the franchise in the National Basketball Association (NBA).

The Timberwolves failed to improve on their 46–36 record from last year after losing to the Toronto Raptors 107–122 on March 18, but they were able to finish with a winning record in back-to-back seasons for the first time since 2004 and 2005 after beating the New Orleans Pelicans 113–108 on April 9 and participated in the play-in tournament for a second straight season. Despite losing to the Los Angeles Lakers 102–108 on April 11, they would beat the Oklahoma City Thunder 120–95 at home to clinch a playoff spot on April 14. However, they lost in the first round to the eventual NBA champion Denver Nuggets in five games. This was the first time since 2003 and 2004 that the Timberwolves made the playoffs in back-to-back seasons. It was the first season with Rudy Gobert after the team acquired him in a preseason trade on July 6, 2022, where they traded five different players (including the draft rights to Walker Kessler) and five first round picks (including a 2026 first round pick swap) to the Utah Jazz.

== Draft ==
Round	Pick	Player	Position(s)	Nationality	College / Club
1	19	Jake LaRavia	Forward	United States	Wake Forest
2	40	Bryce McGowens	Shooting guard	United States	Nebraska
2	48	Kendall Brown	Small forward	United States	Baylor
2	50	Matteo Spagnolo	Shooting guard	Italy	Vanoli Cremola

The Timberwolves owned their first round pick and had three second-round selections, all acquired through prior trades. On June 23, 2022, the Timberwolves traded the draft rights to Kendall Brown to the Indiana Pacers in exchange for cash considerations and a 2026 second round selection.

== Roster ==
2022–23 Minnesota Timberwolves roster
Players

Pos.	No.	Player	Height	Weight	DOB	From
G	9	Nickeil Alexander-Walker	6 ft 6 in (1.98 m)	205 lb (93 kg)	1998-09-02	Virginia Tech
G/F	5	Kyle Anderson	6 ft 9 in (2.06 m)	230 lb (104 kg)	1993-09-20	UCLA
G	10	Mike Conley Jr.	6 ft 1 in (1.85 m)	175 lb (79 kg)	1987-10-11	Ohio State
G	1	Anthony Edwards	6 ft 4 in (1.93 m)	225 lb (102 kg)	2001-08-05	Georgia
F	55	Luka Garza (TW)	6 ft 10 in (2.08 m)	243 lb (110 kg)	1998-12-27	Iowa
C	27	Rudy Gobert	7 ft 1 in (2.16 m)	258 lb (117 kg)	1992-06-26	France
F	13	Nathan Knight	6 ft 8 in (2.03 m)	244 lb (111 kg)	1997-09-20	William & Mary
F	3	Jaden McDaniels	6 ft 9 in (2.06 m)	185 lb (84 kg)	2000-09-29	Washington
G	6	Jordan McLaughlin	5 ft 11 in (1.80 m)	185 lb (84 kg)	1996-04-09	USC
F	8	Josh Minott	6 ft 8 in (2.03 m)	205 lb (93 kg)	2002-11-25	Memphis
G	7	Wendell Moore Jr.	6 ft 5 in (1.96 m)	213 lb (97 kg)	2001-09-18	Duke
G	4	Jaylen Nowell	6 ft 4 in (1.93 m)	201 lb (91 kg)	1999-07-09	Washington
F	12	Taurean Prince	6 ft 7 in (2.01 m)	218 lb (99 kg)	1994-03-22	Baylor
F/C	11	Naz Reid	6 ft 9 in (2.06 m)	264 lb (120 kg)	1999-08-26	LSU
G	25	Austin Rivers	6 ft 4 in (1.93 m)	200 lb (91 kg)	1992-08-01	Duke
F	37	Matt Ryan (TW)	6 ft 6 in (1.98 m)	215 lb (98 kg)	1997-04-17	Chattanooga
F/C	32	Karl-Anthony Towns	7 ft 0 in (2.13 m)	248 lb (112 kg)	1995-11-15	Kentucky

Coaches
Head coach
- Chris Finch
Assistant(s)
- Joe Boylan
- Kevin Hanson
- Micah Nori
- Pablo Prigioni
- Elston Turner

Legend
- (DP) Unsigned draft pick
- (FA) Free agent
- (S) Suspended
- (GL) On assignment to G League affiliate
- (TW) Two-way affiliate player
- Injured

Roster
Updated: October 15, 2022

== Standings ==
=== Division ===
Northwest Division	W	L	PCT	GB	Home	Road	Div	GP
c – Denver Nuggets	53	29	.646	–	34‍–‍7	19‍–‍22	10–6	82
x – Minnesota Timberwolves	42	40	.512	11.0	22‍–‍19	20‍–‍21	8–8	82
pi – Oklahoma City Thunder	40	42	.488	13.0	24‍–‍17	16‍–‍25	9–7	82
Utah Jazz	37	45	.451	16.0	23‍–‍18	14‍–‍27	6–10	82
Portland Trail Blazers	33	49	.402	20.0	17‍–‍24	16‍–‍25	7–9	82

=== Conference ===
Western Conference
#	Team	W	L	PCT	GB	GP
1	c – Denver Nuggets *	53	29	.646	–	82
2	y – Memphis Grizzlies *	51	31	.622	2.0	82
3	y – Sacramento Kings *	48	34	.585	5.0	82
4	x – Phoenix Suns	45	37	.549	8.0	82
5	x – Los Angeles Clippers	44	38	.537	9.0	82
6	x – Golden State Warriors	44	38	.537	9.0	82
7	x – Los Angeles Lakers	43	39	.524	10.0	82
8	x – Minnesota Timberwolves	42	40	.512	11.0	82
9	pi – New Orleans Pelicans	42	40	.512	11.0	82
10	pi – Oklahoma City Thunder	40	42	.488	13.0	82
11	Dallas Mavericks	38	44	.463	15.0	82
12	Utah Jazz	37	45	.451	16.0	82
13	Portland Trail Blazers	33	49	.402	20.0	82
14	Houston Rockets	22	60	.268	31.0	82
15	San Antonio Spurs	22	60	.268	31.0	82

== Game log ==
=== Preseason ===
2022 preseason game log
Total: 4–1 (home: 1–1; road: 3–0)
Preseason: 4–1 (home: 1–1; road: 3–0)

Game	Date	Team	Score	High points	High rebounds	High assists	Location Attendance	Record
1	October 4	@ Miami	W 121–111	Anthony Edwards (24)	Nathan Knight (7)	Jordan McLaughlin (5)	FTX Arena; 19,600	1–0
2	October 6	L.A. Lakers	W 114–99	Edwards, Russell, Nowell (13)	Rudy Gobert (12)	Jordan McLaughlin (6)	T-Mobile Arena; 7,311	2–0
3	October 9	@ L.A. Clippers	W 119–117	Naz Reid (20)	Naz Reid (11)	Towns, Russell, McLaughlin (6)	Crypto.com Arena; 16,466	3–0
4	October 12	@ L.A. Lakers	W 118–113	Naz Reid (22)	Naz Reid (13)	D'Angelo Russell (8)	Crypto.com Arena; 18,754	4–0
5	October 14	Brooklyn	L 102–112	D'Angelo Russell (17)	Karl-Anthony Towns (9)	D'Angelo Russell (6)	Target Center; 12,787	4–1

2022–23 preseason schedule

=== Regular season ===
2022–23 game log
Total: 42–40 (home: 22–19; road: 20–21)
October: 4–3 (home: 3–2; road: 1–1)

Game	Date	Team	Score	High points	High rebounds	High assists	Location Attendance	Record
1	October 19	Oklahoma City	W 115–108	Rudy Gobert (23)	Rudy Gobert (16)	Towns, Edwards (7)	Target Center; 17,136	1–0
2	October 21	Utah	L 126–132 (OT)	Anthony Edwards (30)	Rudy Gobert (23)	D'Angelo Russell (7)	Target Center; 17,136	1–1
3	October 23	@ Oklahoma City	W 116–106	Anthony Edwards (30)	Rudy Gobert (15)	D'Angelo Russell (6)	Paycom Center; 15,044	2–1
4	October 24	San Antonio	L 106–115	Karl-Anthony Towns (27)	Karl-Anthony Towns (11)	D'Angelo Russell (7)	Target Center; 15,347	2–2
5	October 26	@ San Antonio	W 134–122	Anthony Edwards (34)	Rudy Gobert (9)	Edwards, Russell (9)	Target Center; 16,165	3–2
6	October 28	L.A. Lakers	W 111–102	Anthony Edwards (29)	Rudy Gobert (21)	Towns, Russell (7)	Target Center; 17,136	4–2
7	October 30	San Antonio	L 98–107	Karl-Anthony Towns (26)	Rudy Gobert (12)	Anthony Edwards (6)	AT&T Center; 15,051	4–3

November : 7–8 (home: 3–4; road: 4–4)

Game	Date	Team	Score	High points	High rebounds	High assists	Location Attendance	Record
8	November 1	@ Phoenix	L 107–116	Edwards, Towns (24)	Karl-Anthony Towns (10)	Karl-Anthony Towns (7)	Footprint Center; 17,071	4–4
9	November 4	Milwaukee	L 102–115	Anthony Edwards (24)	Rudy Gobert (13)	Karl-Anthony Towns (5)	Target Center; 17,136	4–5
10	November 5	Houston	W 129–117	Karl-Anthony Towns (25)	Karl-Anthony Towns (9)	Jordan McLaughlin (11)	Target Center; 16,412	5–5
11	November 7	New York	L 107–120	Karl-Anthony Towns (25)	Karl-Anthony Towns (13)	D'Angelo Russell (8)	Target Center; 14,524	5–6
12	November 9	Phoenix	L 117–129	Rudy Gobert (25)	Rudy Gobert (11)	Edwards, Russell (6)	Target Center; 16,062	5–7
13	November 11	@ Memphis	L 103–114	Anthony Edwards (28)	Karl-Anthony Towns (10)	D'Angelo Russell (8)	FedExForum; 16,939	5–8
14	November 14	@ Cleveland	W 129–124	D'Angelo Russell (30)	Karl-Anthony Towns (13)	D'Angelo Russell (12)	Rocket Mortgage FieldHouse; 19,432	6–8
15	November 16	@ Orlando	W 126–108	Anthony Edwards (35)	Edwards, McDaniels, Towns (8)	Edwards, Russell (6)	Amway Center; 16,527	7–8
16	November 19	@ Philadelphia	W 112–109	Anthony Edwards (25)	Rudy Gobert (13)	D'Angelo Russell (7)	Wells Fargo Center; 20,515	8–8
17	November 21	Miami	W 105–101	Karl-Anthony Towns (25)	Rudy Gobert (9)	Karl-Anthony Towns (9)	Target Center; 16,583	9–8
18	November 23	@ Indiana	W 115–101	Karl-Anthony Towns (23)	Rudy Gobert (16)	D'Angelo Russell (12)	Gainbridge Fieldhouse; 15,751	10–8
19	November 25	@ Charlotte	L 108–110	Anthony Edwards (25)	Rudy Gobert (17)	D'Angelo Russell (10)	Spectrum Center; 17,924	10–9
20	November 27	Golden State	L 114–137	Anthony Edwards (26)	Rudy Gobert (10)	D'Angelo Russell (6)	Target Center; 17,136	10–10
21	November 28	@ Washington	L 127–142	Anthony Edwards (29)	Anderson, Edwards (8)	D'Angelo Russell (5)	Capital One Arena; 13,515	10–11
22	November 30	Memphis	W 109–101	Anthony Edwards (29)	Kyle Anderson (6)	D'Angelo Russell (10)	Target Center; 15,980	11–11

December: 5–10 (home: 3–3; road: 2–7)

Game	Date	Team	Score	High points	High rebounds	High assists	Location Attendance	Record
23	December 3	Oklahoma City	L 128–135	D'Angelo Russell (27)	Naz Reid (18)	D'Angelo Russell (6)	Target Center; 17,136	11–12
24	December 7	Indiana	W 121–115	D'Angelo Russell (28)	Rudy Gobert (21)	Anthony Edwards (8)	Target Center; 15,472	12–12
25	December 9	@ Utah	W 118–108	D'Angelo Russell (30)	Rudy Gobert (13)	Kyle Anderson (12)	Vivint Arena; 18,206	13–12
26	December 10	@ Portland	L 118–124	Anthony Edwards (26)	Rudy Gobert (9)	Anthony Edwards (7)	Moda Center; 18,324	13–13
27	December 12	@ Portland	L 112–133	D'Angelo Russell (23)	Rudy Gobert (20)	D'Angelo Russell (8)	Moda Center; 18,021	13–14
28	December 14	@ L.A. Clippers	L 88–99	Anthony Edwards (19)	Rudy Gobert (13)	Kyle Anderson (5)	Crypto.com Arena; 14,068	13–15
29	December 16	@ Oklahoma City	W 112–110	Naz Reid (28)	Anthony Edwards (11)	Anthony Edwards (7)	Paycom Center; 14,885	14–15
30	December 18	Chicago	W 150–126	Anthony Edwards (37)	Jaden McDaniels (8)	Anthony Edwards (11)	Target Center; 16,294	15–15
31	December 19	Dallas	W 116–106	Edwards, Reid (27)	Edwards, Reid (13)	Anthony Edwards (9)	Target Center; 16,627	16–15
32	December 21	Dallas	L 99–104	Anthony Edwards (23)	Rudy Gobert (15)	D'Angelo Russell (8)	Target Center; 16,164	16–16
33	December 23	@ Boston	L 109–121	Anthony Edwards (30)	Rudy Gobert (12)	D'Angelo Russell (10)	TD Garden; 19,156	16–17
34	December 26	@ Miami	L 110–113	Anthony Edwards (29)	Naz Reid (11)	D'Angelo Russell (8)	FTX Arena; 19,911	16–18
35	December 28	@ New Orleans	L 118–119	Edwards, Russell (27)	Rudy Gobert (8)	D'Angelo Russell (4)	Smoothie King Center; 18,669	16–19
36	December 30	@ Milwaukee	L 114–123	Anthony Edwards (30)	Anthony Edwards (10)	D'Angelo Russell (7)	Fiserv Forum; 18,018	16–20
37	December 31	Detroit	L 104–116	Anthony Edwards (30)	Rudy Gobert (10)	Edwards, Russell (5)	Target Center; 16,233	16–21

January: 11–5 (home: 9–2; road: 2–3)

Game	Date	Team	Score	High points	High rebounds	High assists	Location Attendance	Record
38	January 2	Denver	W 124–111	Anthony Edwards (29)	Anthony Edwards (10)	Kyle Anderson (8)	Target Center; 15,962	17–21
39	January 4	Portland	W 113–106	Anthony Edwards (32)	Rudy Gobert (12)	D'Angelo Russell (7)	Target Center; 15,434	18–21
40	January 6	L.A. Clippers	W 128–115	Rudy Gobert (25)	Rudy Gobert (21)	Anderson, Nowell (6)	Target Center; 17,136	19–21
41	January 8	@ Houston	W 104–96	D'Angelo Russell (22)	Rudy Gobert (11)	Anderson, Russell (6)	Toyota Center; 18,055	20–21
42	January 11	@ Detroit	L 118–135	Anthony Edwards (20)	Rudy Gobert (14)	Anthony Edwards (6)	Little Caesars Arena; 15,906	20–22
43	January 13	Phoenix	W 121–116	Anthony Edwards (31)	Rudy Gobert (12)	Jaden McDaniels (6)	Target Center; 16,460	21–22
44	January 14	Cleveland	W 110–102	Anthony Edwards (26)	Naz Reid (7)	Anthony Edwards (7)	Target Center; 17,136	22–22
45	January 16	Utah	L 125–126	Anthony Edwards (29)	Kyle Anderson (11)	Kyle Anderson (10)	Target Center; 16,477	22–23
46	January 18	@ Denver	L 118–122	Jaden McDaniels (18)	Kyle Anderson (11)	Kyle Anderson (8)	Ball Arena; 16,112	22–24
47	January 19	Toronto	W 128–126	D'Angelo Russell (25)	Kyle Anderson (10)	Anthony Edwards (7)	Target Center; 16,318	23–24
48	January 21	Houston	W 113–104	Anthony Edwards (44)	Kyle Anderson (7)	D'Angelo Russell (8)	Target Center; 17,136	24–24
49	January 23	@ Houston	L 114–119	Anthony Edwards (31)	Rudy Gobert (16)	D'Angelo Russell (7)	Toyota Center; 13,811	24–25
50	January 25	@ New Orleans	W 111–102	Anthony Edwards (37)	Rudy Gobert (12)	Kyle Anderson (7)	Smoothie King Center; 14,877	25–25
51	January 27	Memphis	W 111–100	Anthony Edwards (25)	Rudy Gobert (13)	Edwards, Russell (7)	Target Center; 17,136	26–25
52	January 28	Sacramento	W 117–110	Anthony Edwards (34)	Rudy Gobert (14)	Edwards, Russell (6)	Target Center; 17,136	27–25
53	January 30	Sacramento	L 111–118 (OT)	Anthony Edwards (33)	Rudy Gobert (14)	D'Angelo Russell (7)	Target Center; 15,342	27–26

February : 5–6 (home: 2–3; road: 3–3)

Game	Date	Team	Score	High points	High rebounds	High assists	Location Attendance	Record
54	February 1	Golden State	W 119–114	D'Angelo Russell (29)	Naz Reid (13)	Edwards, Rivers (5)	Target Center; 17,136	28–26
55	February 3	Orlando	L 120–127	D'Angelo Russell (29)	D'Angelo Russell (10)	D'Angelo Russell (6)	Target Center; 17,136	28–27
56	February 5	Denver	W 128–98	Anthony Edwards (20)	Rudy Gobert (8)	D'Angelo Russell (10)	Target Center; 17,136	29–27
57	February 7	@ Denver	L 112–146	Edwards, Garza (19)	Luka Garza (9)	Wendell Moore Jr. (5)	Ball Arena; 18,307	29–28
58	February 8	@ Utah	W 143–118	Anthony Edwards (31)	Josh Minott (11)	Anthony Edwards (8)	Vivint Arena; 18,206	30–28
59	February 10	@ Memphis	L 107–128	Jaylen Nowell (21)	Rudy Gobert (10)	Anthony Edwards (5)	FedEx Forum; 17,794	30–29
60	February 13	@ Dallas	W 124–121	Anthony Edwards (32)	Rudy Gobert (14)	Mike Conley Jr. (9)	American Airlines Center; 20,325	31–29
61	February 16	Washington	L 106–114	Anthony Edwards (34)	Rudy Gobert (19)	Kyle Anderson (8)	Target Center; 17,136	31–30
62	February 24	Charlotte	L 113–121	Anthony Edwards (29)	Rudy Gobert (10)	Kyle Anderson (6)	Target Center; 17,136	31–31
63	February 26	@ Golden State	L 104–109	Naz Reid (30)	Anderson, Reid (9)	Conley Jr., Edwards (7)	Chase Center; 18,064	31–32
64	February 28	@ L.A. Clippers	W 108–101	Jaden McDaniels (20)	Kyle Anderson (10)	Mike Conley Jr. (7)	Crypto.com Arena; 17,022	32–32

March : 7–7 (home: 1–4; road: 6–3)

Game	Date	Team	Score	High points	High rebounds	High assists	Location Attendance	Record
65	March 3	@ L.A. Lakers	W 110–102	Rudy Gobert (22)	Rudy Gobert (14)	Jordan McLaughlin (6)	Crypto.com Arena; 18,997	33–32
66	March 4	@ Sacramento	W 138–134	Anthony Edwards (27)	Rudy Gobert (14)	Kyle Anderson (9)	Golden 1 Center; 18,111	34–32
67	March 7	Philadelphia	L 94–117	Anthony Edwards (32)	Rudy Gobert (9)	Conley Jr., McLaughlin, Reid (3)	Target Center; 17,136	34–33
68	March 10	Brooklyn	L 123–124 (OT)	Anthony Edwards (32)	Rudy Gobert (13)	Kyle Anderson (11)	Target Center; 17,136	34–34
69	March 13	@ Atlanta	W 136–115	Anthony Edwards (32)	Kyle Anderson (10)	Kyle Anderson (12)	State Farm Arena; 17,799	35–34
70	March 15	Boston	L 102–104	Anthony Edwards (28)	Anthony Edwards (10)	Kyle Anderson (8)	Target Center; 17,136	35–35
71	March 17	@ Chicago	L 131–139 (2OT)	Mike Conley Jr. (28)	Rudy Gobert (19)	Kyle Anderson (12)	United Center; 20,109	35–36
72	March 18	@ Toronto	L 107–122	Naz Reid (22)	Rudy Gobert (12)	Jordan McLaughlin (8)	Scotiabank Arena; 19,800	35–37
73	March 20	@ New York	W 140–134	Taurean Prince (35)	Kyle Anderson (9)	Mike Conley Jr. (11)	Madison Square Garden; 19,812	36–37
74	March 22	Atlanta	W 125–124	Naz Reid (26)	Rudy Gobert (12)	Kyle Anderson (7)	Target Center; 17,136	37–37
75	March 26	@ Golden State	W 99–96	Naz Reid (23)	Rudy Gobert (18)	Kyle Anderson (7)	Chase Center; 18,064	38–37
76	March 27	@ Sacramento	W 119–115	Jaden McDaniels (20)	Rudy Gobert (16)	Kyle Anderson (11)	Golden 1 Center; 18,151	39–37
77	March 29	@ Phoenix	L 100–107	Anthony Edwards (31)	Rudy Gobert (15)	Edwards, McLaughlin (6)	Footprint Center; 17,071	39–38
78	March 31	L.A. Lakers	L 111–123	Mike Conley Jr. (25)	Rudy Gobert (11)	Mike Conley Jr. (7)	Target Center; 18,978	39–39

April: 3–1 (home: 1–1; road: 2–0)

Game	Date	Team	Score	High points	High rebounds	High assists	Location Attendance	Record
79	April 2	Portland	L 105–107	Anthony Edwards (37)	Rudy Gobert (15)	Kyle Anderson (7)	Target Center; 18,978	39–40
80	April 4	@ Brooklyn	W 107–102	Anthony Edwards (23)	Karl-Anthony Towns (14)	Kyle Anderson (10)	Barclays Center; 17,893	40–40
81	April 8	@ San Antonio	W 151–131	Anthony Edwards (33)	Rudy Gobert (13)	Jordan McLaughlin (9)	Moody Center; 16,148	41–40
82	April 9	New Orleans	W 113–108	Karl-Anthony Towns (30)	Anthony Edwards (13)	Mike Conley Jr. (7)	Target Center; 18,978	42–40

2022–23 season schedule

=== Play-in ===
2023 play-in game log
Total: 1–1 (home: 1–0; road: 0–1)
Play-in: 1–1 (home: 1–0; road: 0–1)

Game	Date	Team	Score	High points	High rebounds	High assists	Location Attendance	Record
1	April 11	@ L.A. Lakers	L 102–108 (OT)	Karl-Anthony Towns (24)	Karl-Anthony Towns (11)	Kyle Anderson (13)	Crypto.com Arena; 18,997	0–1
2	April 14	Oklahoma City	W 120–95	Karl-Anthony Towns (28)	Karl-Anthony Towns (11)	Alexander-Walker, Edwards (6)	Target Center; 19,304	1–1

2022–23 season schedule

=== Playoffs ===
2023 playoff game log
Total: 1–4 (home: 1–1; road: 0–3)
First Round: 1–4 (home: 1–1; road: 0–3)

Game	Date	Team	Score	High points	High rebounds	High assists	Location Attendance	Series
1	April 16	@ Denver	L 80–109	Anthony Edwards (18)	Rudy Gobert (13)	Anthony Edwards (5)	Ball Arena; 19,628	0–1
2	April 19	@ Denver	L 113–122	Anthony Edwards (41)	Karl-Anthony Towns (12)	Mike Conley Jr. (7)	Ball Arena; 19,683	0–2
3	April 21	Denver	L 111–120	Anthony Edwards (36)	Rudy Gobert (10)	Kyle Anderson (6)	Target Center; 19,536	0–3
4	April 23	Denver	W 114–108 (OT)	Anthony Edwards (34)	Rudy Gobert (15)	Mike Conley Jr. (8)	Target Center; 18,978	1–3
5	April 25	@ Denver	L 109–112	Anthony Edwards (29)	Rudy Gobert (15)	Mike Conley Jr. (9)	Ball Arena; 19,691	1–4

2023 playoff schedule

== Player statistics ==
=== Regular season ===
Player	POS	GP	GS	MP	REB	AST	STL	BLK	PTS	MPG	RPG	APG	SPG	BPG	PPG
Anthony Edwards	SG	79	79	2,842	458	350	125	58	1,946	36.0	5.8	4.4	1.6	.7	24.6
Jaden McDaniels	SF	79	79	2,416	307	148	74	76	953	30.6	3.9	1.9	.9	1.0	12.1
Rudy Gobert	C	70	70	2,148	814	87	56	95	939	30.7	11.6	1.2	.8	1.4	13.4
Kyle Anderson	PF	69	46	1,957	368	335	78	63	647	28.4	5.3	4.9	1.1	.9	9.4
Naz Reid	C	68	11	1,251	333	77	42	53	781	18.4	4.9	1.1	.6	.8	11.5
Jaylen Nowell	SG	65	2	1,252	170	132	42	5	704	19.3	2.6	2.0	.6	.1	10.8
D'Angelo Russell^{†}	PG	54	54	1,778	165	334	60	21	967	32.9	3.1	6.2	1.1	.4	17.9
Taurean Prince	PF	54	4	1,192	132	84	28	15	493	22.1	2.4	1.6	.5	.3	9.1
Austin Rivers	SG	52	10	1,016	83	75	28	4	255	19.5	1.6	1.4	.5	.1	4.9
Jordan McLaughlin	PG	43	0	678	62	148	32	4	161	15.8	1.4	3.4	.7	.1	3.7
Nathan Knight	C	38	0	291	56	13	10	6	139	7.7	1.5	.3	.3	.2	3.7
Karl-Anthony Towns	PF	29	29	957	236	140	20	17	602	33.0	8.1	4.8	.7	.6	20.8
Wendell Moore Jr.	SG	29	2	153	18	18	8	5	42	5.3	.6	.6	.3	.2	1.4
Luka Garza	C	28	0	243	63	18	3	2	181	8.7	2.3	.6	.1	.1	6.5
Bryn Forbes	SG	25	0	268	15	17	7	2	89	10.7	.6	.7	.3	.1	3.6
Mike Conley Jr.^{†}	PG	24	24	753	75	120	29	4	337	31.4	3.1	5.0	1.2	.2	14.0
Nickeil Alexander-Walker^{†}	SG	23	0	356	42	32	8	7	135	15.5	1.8	1.4	.3	.3	5.9
Matt Ryan^{†}	SF	22	0	181	12	12	3	1	75	8.2	.5	.5	.1	.0	3.4
Josh Minott	SF	15	0	96	25	5	4	6	46	6.4	1.7	.3	.3	.4	3.1
A. J. Lawson^{†}	SG	1	0	2	1	0	0	0	2	2.0	1.0	.0	.0	.0	2.0

- ^{†} Denotes player spent time with another team in the season. Stats reflect time with the Timberwolves only.

=== Playoffs ===
Player	POS	GP	GS	MP	REB	AST	STL	BLK	PTS	MPG	RPG	APG	SPG	BPG	PPG
Anthony Edwards	SG	5	5	199	25	26	9	10	158	39.8	5.0	5.2	1.8	2.0	31.6
Mike Conley Jr.	PG	5	5	183	13	32	3	0	60	36.6	2.6	6.4	.6	.0	12.0
Karl-Anthony Towns	PF	5	5	180	51	10	3	4	91	36.0	10.2	2.0	.6	.8	18.2
Rudy Gobert	C	5	5	177	61	10	2	5	75	35.4	12.2	2.0	.4	1.0	15.0
Nickeil Alexander-Walker	SG	5	4	148	10	7	3	1	42	29.6	2.0	1.4	.6	.2	8.4
Taurean Prince	PF	5	1	100	7	4	3	1	39	20.0	1.4	.8	.6	.2	7.8
Jaylen Nowell	SG	5	0	62	5	3	0	0	16	12.4	1.0	.6	.0	.0	3.2
Kyle Anderson	PF	4	0	104	16	18	7	2	34	26.0	4.0	4.5	1.8	.5	8.5
Austin Rivers	SG	4	0	46	5	1	1	0	10	11.5	1.3	.3	.3	.0	2.5
Jordan McLaughlin	PG	2	0	14	2	2	0	0	0	7.0	1.0	1.0	.0	.0	.0
Nathan Knight	C	2	0	5	1	0	0	0	2	2.5	.5	.0	.0	.0	1.0
Josh Minott	SF	1	0	6	0	0	2	1	0	6.0	.0	.0	2.0	1.0	.0
Wendell Moore Jr.	SG	1	0	2	0	0	0	0	0	2.0	.0	.0	.0	.0	.0

== Transactions ==
=== Trades ===
June 23, 2022	To Minnesota Timberwolves 2026 second-round pick Cash considerations	To Indiana Pacers 2022 pick No. 48
June 24, 2022	To Minnesota Timberwolves Draft rights to Josh Minott (No. 45); 2023 NYK second-round pick	To Charlotte Hornets Draft rights to Bryce McGowens (No. 40)
June 24, 2022	To Minnesota Timberwolves Draft rights to Walker Kessler (No. 22); Draft rights to TyTy Washington (No. 29)	To Memphis Grizzlies Draft rights to Jake LaRavia (No. 19); 2023 MIN second-round pick
June 24, 2022	To Minnesota Timberwolves Draft rights to Wendell Moore Jr. (No. 26)	To Houston Rockets Draft rights to TyTy Washington (No. 29); 2025 MIN second-round pick 2027 MIN second-round pick
July 6, 2022	To Minnesota Timberwolves Rudy Gobert	To Utah Jazz Patrick Beverley; Malik Beasley; Jarred Vanderbilt; Leandro Bolmaro; Draft rights to Walker Kessler; 2023 MIN first-round pick 2025 MIN first-round pick 2026 first round-pick swap 2027 MIN first-round pick 2029 MIN first-round pick
February 9, 2023	To Minnesota Timberwolves Nickeil Alexander-Walker (from Utah); Mike Conley (from Utah); 2024 second-round pick (from Los Angeles); 2025 UTA second-round pick (from Utah); 2026 UTA second-round pick (from Utah)	To Los Angeles Lakers Malik Beasley (from Utah); D'Angelo Russell (from Minnesota); Jarred Vanderbilt (from Utah)
February 9, 2023	To Utah Jazz Damian Jones (from Los Angeles); Juan Toscano-Anderson (from Los Angeles); Russell Westbrook (from Los Angeles); 2027 LAL protected first-round pick (from Los Angeles)

=== Free agency ===
==== Re-signed ====
Player	Signed	Ref.
Taurean Prince	June 30	
Nathan Knight	July 25	

==== Additions ====
Date	Player	Former team	Ref.
July 8	Kyle Anderson	Memphis Grizzlies	
July 11	Bryn Forbes	Denver Nuggets	
July 21	Austin Rivers	Denver Nuggets	
