= Josh Minott =

Jamaican-American basketball player (born 2002)

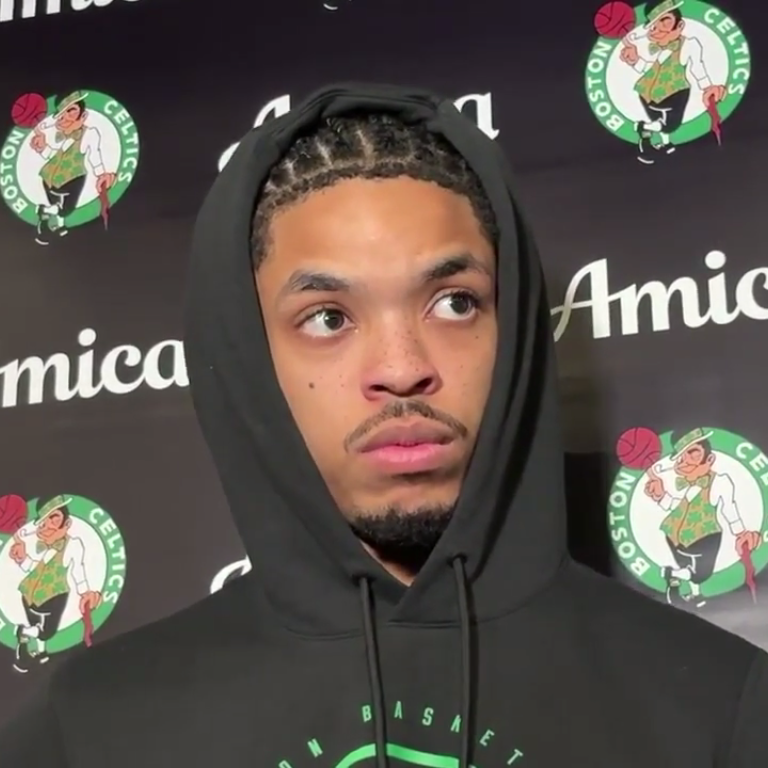
- Minott with the Boston Celtics in 2025

No. 00 – Brooklyn Nets
- Position: Small forward / power forward
- League: NBA

Personal information
- Born: November 25, 2002 (age 23) Boca Raton, Florida, U.S.
- Listed height: 6 ft 9 in (2.06 m)
- Listed weight: 215 lb (98 kg)

Career information
- High school: Saint Andrew's School (Boca Raton, Florida)
- College: Memphis (2021–2022)
- NBA draft: 2022: 2nd round, 45th overall pick
- Drafted by: Charlotte Hornets
- Playing career: 2022–present

Career history
- 2022–2025: Minnesota Timberwolves
- 2022–2024: →Iowa Wolves
- 2025–2026: Boston Celtics
- 2026–present: Brooklyn Nets
- 2026: →Long Island Nets

Career highlights
- AAC All-Freshman Team (2022)
- Stats at NBA.com
- Stats at Basketball Reference

Joshua Robert Tyler Minott (/ˈmaɪnɒt/ MY-not; born November 25, 2002) is a Jamaican-American professional basketball player for the Brooklyn Nets of the National Basketball Association (NBA). He played college basketball for the Memphis Tigers. Minott was selected by the Charlotte Hornets with the 45th overall pick in the 2022 NBA draft, but was immediately traded to the Minnesota Timberwolves. After spending his first three seasons with the Timberwolves, Minott signed with the Boston Celtics in July of 2025. Minott would play for the Celtics for half of the 2025–26 season before being traded to the Nets in February of 2026.

== Early life ==
Minott played basketball for Saint Andrew's School in Boca Raton, Florida. In his junior season, he averaged 17.2 points, 7.4 rebounds and 3.3 assists per game, helping his team win the Class 3A state championship, its first state title. As a senior, Minott averaged 23.1 points and 8.3 rebounds per game, and was named Palm Beach County Class 5A-1A Player of the Year by the Sun-Sentinel. A four-star recruit, he committed to playing college basketball for Memphis over offers from Florida State, Texas, Baylor and Maryland.

== College career ==
On January 23, 2022, Minott recorded a career-high 18 points and nine rebounds in an 83–81 win over Tulsa. As a freshman at Memphis, he averaged 6.6 points and 3.8 rebounds in 14.6 minutes per game. Minott was named to the American Athletic Conference (AAC) All-Freshman Team and was a three-time AAC Freshman of the Week. On March 24, 2022, he declared for the 2022 NBA draft while maintaining his college eligibility. He opted to remain in the draft, forgoing his remaining college eligibility.

== Professional career ==
=== Minnesota Timberwolves (2022–2025) ===
In the 2022 NBA draft, Minott was drafted by the Charlotte Hornets with the 45th pick in the draft. He was later traded to the Minnesota Timberwolves, along with a 2023 second-round draft pick via the New York Knicks in exchange for Bryce McGowens, the 40th pick in the draft. Minott joined the Timberwolves' 2022 NBA Summer League roster. In his Summer League debut, Minott scored twenty-two points and had ten rebounds in a 85–78 win over the Denver Nuggets. On July 17, 2022, Minott signed a four-year, $6.8 million deal with the Timberwolves.

=== Boston Celtics (2025–2026) ===
On July 7, 2025, Minott signed a two-year, $5 million contract with the Boston Celtics. Minott made 33 appearances (including 10 starts) for the Celtics during the 2025–26 NBA season, averaging 5.8 points, 3.6 rebounds, and 1.0 assists.

=== Brooklyn Nets (2026–present) ===
On February 5, 2026, Minott was traded to the Brooklyn Nets in exchange for cash considerations. On February 17, he and Ben Saraf were assigned to the Long Island Nets of the NBA G League. On March 12, Minott recorded a career-high 24 points during a 97–108 loss to the Atlanta Hawks. He made 16 total appearances (including one start) for Brooklyn, recording averages of 10.8 points, 2.5 rebounds, and 0.8 assists.

On June 29, 2026, Minott re-signed with the Nets on a two-year, $9 million contract. On November 16th, he was fined $25,000 by the NBA for making an obscene gesture towards the stands in Memphis

== National team career ==
Minott was born in Florida but plays for the Jamaican national team. At the 2019 Centrobasket Under-17 Championship in Puerto Rico, he averaged 26 points, nine rebounds and 4.6 steals per game.

== Career statistics ==
Legend
GP	Games played	GS	Games started	MPG	Minutes per game
FG%	Field goal percentage	3P%	3-point field goal percentage	FT%	Free throw percentage
RPG	Rebounds per game	APG	Assists per game	SPG	Steals per game
BPG	Blocks per game	PPG	Points per game	**Bold**	Career high

=== NBA ===
==== Regular season ====
Year	Team	GP	GS	MPG	FG%	3P%	FT%	RPG	APG	SPG	BPG	PPG
2022–23	Minnesota	15	0	6.4	.500	.333	**1.000**	1.7	.3	.3	.4	3.1
2023–24	Minnesota	32	0	2.8	.472	.400	.857	.5	.3	.2	.2	1.6
2024–25	Minnesota	**46**	0	6.0	.489	.326	.895	1.0	.4	.3	.3	2.6
2025–26	Boston	33	**10**	15.9	**.507**	**.442**	.769	**3.6**	**1.0**	.7	.4	5.8
2025–26	Brooklyn	16	1	**19.3**	.491	.395	.800	2.5	.8	**1.3**	**.8**	**10.8**
Career		142	11	9.1	.495	.396	.833	1.7	.5	.5	.3	4.1

==== Playoffs ====
Year	Team	GP	GS	MPG	FG%	3P%	FT%	RPG	APG	SPG	BPG	PPG
2023	Minnesota	1	0	**6.3**	.000	.000	—	.0	.0	**2.0**	**1.0**	.0
2024	Minnesota	**5**	0	3.6	.222	**.400**	—	**1.0**	**.6**	.0	.0	**1.2**
2025	Minnesota	**5**	0	4.6	**.250**	.167	—	.0	.4	.0	.2	1.0
Career		11	0	4.3	.222	.250	—	.5	.5	.2	.2	1.0

=== College ===
Year	Team	GP	GS	MPG	FG%	3P%	FT%	RPG	APG	SPG	BPG	PPG
2021–22	Memphis	33	5	14.6	.522	.143	.754	3.8	.9	.8	.7	6.6
