= Naz Reid =

American basketball player (born 1999)

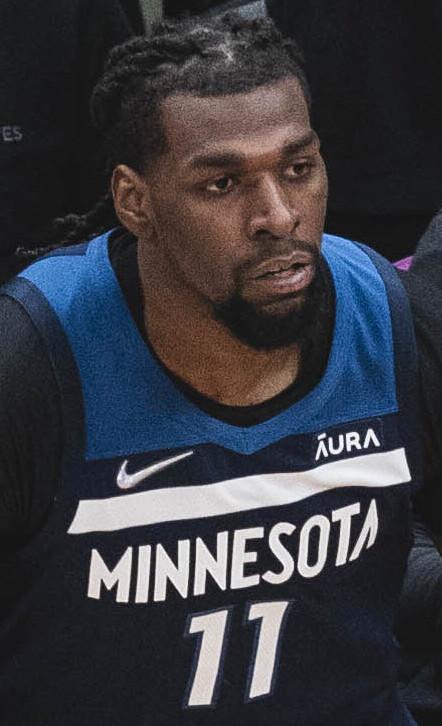
- Reid with the Minnesota Timberwolves in 2021

No. 0 – Charlotte Hornets
- Position: Center / power forward
- League: NBA

Personal information
- Born: August 26, 1999 (age 27) Asbury Park, New Jersey, U.S.
- Listed height: 6 ft 9 in (2.06 m)
- Listed weight: 264 lb (120 kg)

Career information
- High school: Roselle Catholic (Roselle, New Jersey)
- College: LSU (2018–2019)
- NBA draft: 2019: undrafted
- Playing career: 2019–present

Career history
- 2019–2026: Minnesota Timberwolves
- 2026–present: Charlotte Hornets

Career highlights
- NBA Sixth Man of the Year (2024); McDonald's All-American (2018)
- Stats at NBA.com
- Stats at Basketball Reference

Nazreon Hilton Reid (/ˈnɑːz/ NAHZ; born August 26, 1999) is an American professional basketball player for the Charlotte Hornets of the National Basketball Association (NBA). He played college basketball for the LSU Tigers. Reid won the NBA Sixth Man of the Year Award in 2024. He recently signed a three-year $42 million contract with the Minnesota Timberwolves, before being traded to the Hornets in the summer of 2026.

== High school career ==
Reid grew up in Asbury Park, New Jersey with his mother, Anashia, and sisters Toraya and Jakahya. He attended Roselle Catholic High School. Following his senior season, in which he averaged 14.8 points, 7.7 rebounds, and 2.1 blocks per game, Reid was invited to the 2018 McDonald's All-American Boys Game. During the game, he scored 15 points, had 11 rebounds, two assists, and one block while playing for 20 minutes. Reid scored 22 points as Roselle Catholic defeated Don Bosco Prep in the NJSIAA Tournament of Champions. During his high school career he was a member of the Jelly Fam, an internet movement focused around wild finger roll layups. Nicknamed "Big Jelly", he was known for playing like a big and flashy guard. He was the only member of the movement to make it to the NBA. In January 2025, his high school retired his number - 5 - in a ceremony he and his Timberwolves teammates attended in the school gym in Roselle, New Jersey.

=== Recruiting ===
Reid was a consensus 5-star recruit in high school, ranked the best power forward in New Jersey and the third-best power forward in the U.S., as well as the 22nd-best player in his class by 247 sports. On September 12, 2017, Reid committed to play college basketball at LSU (Louisiana State University), with his friend Matthew McMahon. Reid later said, "What drew me to the school is Coach Wade, [assistant] Coach Greg Heiar, all the other coaches."

College recruiting
Name	Hometown	School	Height	Weight	Commit date
Naz Reid; PF	Asbury Park, NJ	Roselle Catholic (NJ)	6 ft 10 in (2.08 m)	240 lb (110 kg)	Sep 12, 2017
Naz Reid; PF	Recruit ratings: Rivals: 247Sports: ESPN: (93)				
Overall recruit ranking: Rivals: 21 247Sports: 22 ESPN: 12
Note: In many cases, Scout, Rivals, 247Sports, On3, and ESPN may conflict in their listings of height and weight.; In these cases, the average was taken. ESPN grades are on a 100-point scale.; Sources: "LSU 2018 Basketball Commitments". Rivals.; "2018 LSU Tigers Recruiting Class". ESPN.; "2018 Team Ranking". Rivals.

== College career ==
Reid made his college debut on November 6, 2018, with 17 points and 6 rebounds in a 94–63 win over Southeastern Louisiana University. Three days later, he scored his season-high 29 points, along with 7 rebounds, and shooting 4–6 behind the arc. Throughout his freshman season, Reid averaged 13.6 points, 7.2 rebounds, and 0.9 assists. On April 3, 2019, he declared for the 2019 NBA draft and hired an agent, foregoing his final three years of college eligibility.

== Professional career ==
=== Minnesota Timberwolves (2019–2026) ===
After going undrafted in the 2019 NBA draft, Reid signed with the Minnesota Timberwolves of the National Basketball Association (NBA) on July 5, 2019, on a two-way contract with the Timberwolves' NBA G League affiliate, the Iowa Wolves. Under that deal's terms, Reid would split time between Minnesota and Iowa. He also played for Minnesota in the 2019 NBA Summer League. On July 17, Reid signed a multi-year contract with the Timberwolves. He was assigned to the Timberwolves' NBA G League affiliate, the Iowa Wolves, for opening night of the G League season. Reid made his NBA debut on December 8, scoring three points in a 125–142 loss to the Los Angeles Lakers. On January 13, 2020, he scored a season-high 20 points in a 104–117 loss to the Oklahoma City Thunder.

On February 6, 2021, Reid scored a career-high 29 points, alongside six rebounds and two steals, in a 118–120 loss to the Oklahoma City Thunder.

On January 2, 2022, Reid scored a season-high 23 points, alongside 11 rebounds, in a 103–108 loss to the Lakers. He was a key reserve on a Timberwolves team that qualified for their first postseason appearance since 2018. Reid made his first playoff appearance during the first round of the playoffs on April 16, recording two rebounds in a 130–117 Game 1 win over the Memphis Grizzlies. The Timberwolves lost to the Grizzlies in six games.

On December 16, 2022, during his first start of the season, Reid scored a season-high 28 points and grabbed nine rebounds to help Minnesota to a 112–110 win over the Thunder. On February 1, 2023, he recorded 24 points, 13 rebounds and four assists in a 119–114 overtime win over the Golden State Warriors. On March 29, during a 107–100 loss to the Phoenix Suns, Reid suffered a left wrist injury in the fourth quarter. Two days later, the Timberwolves announced that he was diagnosed with a left scaphoid fracture of his left wrist and would be out indefinitely.

On June 25, 2023, Reid signed a three-year $42 million contract extension with the Timberwolves. The extension included a player option for the 2025–26 season. On March 8, 2024, Reid scored a career-high 34 points during a 113–104 loss against the Cleveland Cavaliers. On April 24, 2024, he received the NBA Sixth Man of the Year Award.

Reid made 80 appearances (17 starts) for Minnesota during the 2024–25 NBA season, averaging 14.2 points, 6.0 rebounds, and 2.3 assists. On June 27, 2025, Reid and the Timberwolves agreed to a five-year, $125 million contract extension.

On February 9, 2026, Reid was ejected from a game against the Atlanta Hawks after being involved in an altercation with Mouhamed Gueye early in the fourth quarter. He and Gueye were both subsequently fined $35,000 for the incident.

In March 2026, Reid was fined $50,000 for questioning the integrity of the officials by the NBA. He was thrown out by referee Scott Foster during the game against Houston Rockets.

=== Charlotte Hornets (2026–present) ===
On July 10, 2026, Reid, alongside Mouhamadou Gueye, the draft rights to Matteo Spagnolo, a 2033 first-round pick, three second-round picks, and three first-round pick swaps, was traded to the Charlotte Hornets as part of a four-team trade in which the Timberwolves acquired LaMelo Ball, Josh Green, and the draft rights to Isaiah Evans.

On October 21, Reid made his Hornets debut, recording a double-double of 20 points and 11 rebounds to go with seven assists in a 110–103 win over the Brooklyn Nets.

== Fan reception ==
Despite serving as the Minnesota Timberwolves’ backup center, Naz Reid has developed a strong following among fans in Minnesota. The Minnesota Star Tribune has noted that his name has become widely used among Timberwolves supporters, describing it as a form of shared expression within the fan community.

At a March 22, 2024 game, the Timberwolves gave away beach towels emblazoned with his name—they would later sell for more than $100 on eBay. During their 2024 playoff series against the Denver Nuggets, a tattoo artist in Roseville offered $20 tattoos of his name. Over 200 people took him up on it. Later that month, a local pizzeria went viral for their “Honk if you love Naz Reid” sign. A contestant on Jeopardy! even revealed she had named her cat after him (stylized as NAZ REID). At the 2024 Minnesota State Fair, crop artists including Tara Cantwell, Sarah Jerome, Maureen Sorensen, and Ike Whiting celebrated Naz Reid in seeds, grains, and plant material.

== Career statistics ==
Legend
GP	Games played	GS	Games started	MPG	Minutes per game
FG%	Field goal percentage	3P%	3-point field goal percentage	FT%	Free throw percentage
RPG	Rebounds per game	APG	Assists per game	SPG	Steals per game
BPG	Blocks per game	PPG	Points per game	**Bold**	Career high

=== NBA ===
==== Regular season ====
Year	Team	GP	GS	MPG	FG%	3P%	FT%	RPG	APG	SPG	BPG	PPG
2019–20	Minnesota	30	11	16.5	.412	.330	.698	4.1	1.2	.6	.7	9.0
2020–21	Minnesota	70	15	19.2	.523	.351	.693	4.6	1.0	.5	**1.1**	11.2
2021–22	Minnesota	77	6	15.8	.489	.343	.765	3.9	.9	.5	.9	8.3
2022–23	Minnesota	68	11	18.4	**.537**	.346	.677	4.9	1.1	.6	.8	11.5
2023–24	Minnesota	**81**	14	24.2	.477	**.414**	.736	5.2	1.3	.8	.9	13.5
2024–25	Minnesota	80	**17**	**27.5**	.462	.379	**.776**	6.0	**2.3**	.7	.9	**14.2**
2025–26	Minnesota	77	3	26.1	.456	.362	.732	**6.2**	2.2	**1.0**	1.0	13.6
Career		483	77	21.7	.481	.371	.728	5.1	1.5	.7	.9	11.9

==== Playoffs ====
Year	Team	GP	GS	MPG	FG%	3P%	FT%	RPG	APG	SPG	BPG	PPG
2022	Minnesota	5	0	10.8	.412	**.429**	**1.000**	2.8	.0	.2	**1.2**	4.8
2024	Minnesota	**16**	0	22.5	.458	.362	.710	3.7	1.0	.5	.8	11.1
2025	Minnesota	15	0	25.0	**.509**	.397	.760	4.7	1.7	**.7**	.9	10.4
2026	Minnesota	12	0	**26.9**	.484	.400	.647	**7.3**	**2.1**	.4	.3	**12.6**
Career		48	0	23.2	.478	.387	.738	4.8	1.4	.5	.8	10.6

=== College ===
Year	Team	GP	GS	MPG	FG%	3P%	FT%	RPG	APG	SPG	BPG	PPG
2018–19	LSU	34	32	27.2	.468	.333	.727	7.2	.9	.7	.7	13.6

== Personal life ==
Reid's older sister, Toraya, was fatally shot outside of an apartment complex in Jackson Township, New Jersey, on September 6, 2025, at the age of 28. Her boyfriend at the time was arrested shortly thereafter in connection with her death.
