= 2026–27 Atlanta Hawks season =

- Head coach: Quin Snyder
- General manager: Onsi Saleh
- Owner: Tony Ressler
- Arena: State Farm Arena

Results
- Record: 10–6 (.625)
- Place: Division: 1st (Southeast); Conference: 4th (Eastern)
- Stats at Basketball Reference

Local media
- Television: WANF/Peachtree Sports Network
- Radio: 92.9 FM "The Game"

The 2026–27 Atlanta Hawks season is the 78th season of the franchise in the National Basketball Association (NBA) and 59th in Atlanta. The Hawks will attempt to defend their division championship from the previous season. On May 27, 2026, the Hawks announced the promotion of general manager Onsi Saleh to president of basketball operations.

== Draft picks ==
Round	Pick	Player	Position	Nationality	College
1	8	Kingston Flemings	PG	United States	Houston
1	23	Zuby Ejiofor	PF	United States	St. John's
2	57	Narcisse Ngoy	PF	France	Poitiers Basket 86 (France)

The Hawks entered the draft holding two first-round selections and one second-round selection, all acquired through previous trades. They swapped their original first-round selection with the San Antonio Spurs (who subsequently traded the pick to the Cleveland Cavaliers), while their original second-round selection was traded to the Golden State Warriors and ultimately conveyed to the Denver Nuggets. The latter became the less favorable of two selections after the Hawks finished with a better record than the Los Angeles Clippers in the previous season.

On the second day of the draft, the Hawks and the Clippers swapped their second-round selections.

== Roster ==
Atlanta Hawks roster
Players

Pos.	No.	Player	Height	Weight	DOB	From
G	7	Nickeil Alexander-Walker	6 ft 5 in (1.96 m)	205 lb (93 kg)	1998-09-02	Virginia Tech
C	30	Rafael Castro (TW)	6 ft 11 in (2.11 m)	225 lb (102 kg)	2003-03-30	George Washington
G	5	Dyson Daniels	6 ft 7 in (2.01 m)	199 lb (90 kg)	2003-03-17	Australia
G	10	RayJ Dennis (TW)	6 ft 1 in (1.85 m)	180 lb (82 kg)	2001-03-30	Baylor
G	0	Luguentz Dort	6 ft 4 in (1.93 m)	220 lb (100 kg)	1999-04-19	Arizona State
F	20	Zuby Ejiofor	6 ft 8 in (2.03 m)	240 lb (109 kg)	2004-04-20	St. John's
F	8	Dorian Finney-Smith	6 ft 7 in (2.01 m)	220 lb (100 kg)	1993-05-04	Florida
G	4	Kingston Flemings	6 ft 3 in (1.91 m)	190 lb (86 kg)	2007-01-03	Houston
F	18	Mouhamed Gueye (injured)	6 ft 11 in (2.11 m)	210 lb (95 kg)	2002-11-09	Washington State
F	1	Jalen Johnson	6 ft 8 in (2.03 m)	219 lb (99 kg)	2001-12-18	Duke
F	24	Corey Kispert	6 ft 6 in (1.98 m)	224 lb (102 kg)	1999-03-03	Gonzaga
C	31	Jock Landale	6 ft 11 in (2.11 m)	255 lb (116 kg)	1995-10-25	Saint Mary's
G	3	CJ McCollum (injured)	6 ft 2 in (1.88 m)	190 lb (86 kg)	1991-09-19	Lehigh
F	14	Asa Newell (injured)	6 ft 9 in (2.06 m)	220 lb (100 kg)	2005-10-05	Georgia
F/C	17	Onyeka Okongwu	6 ft 10 in (2.08 m)	240 lb (109 kg)	2000-12-11	USC
C	13	Henri Veesaar (injured)	6 ft 11 in (2.11 m)	225 lb (102 kg)	2004-03-28	North Carolina
G	2	Aaron Wiggins	6 ft 5 in (1.96 m)	190 lb (86 kg)	1999-01-02	Maryland
F	22	Jalen Wilson (TW)	6 ft 6 in (1.98 m)	220 lb (100 kg)	2000-11-04	Kansas

Coaches
Head coach
- Quin Snyder
Assistant(s)
- Bryan Bailey
- Mike Brey
- Steve Klei
- Antonio Lang
- Sanjay Lumpkin
- Reggis Onwukamuche
- Ryan Schmidt
- Ashton Smith
- Ekpe Udoh
- Jett Watkinson

Legend
- (DP) Unsigned draft pick
- (FA) Free agent
- (S) Suspended
- (GL) On assignment to G League affiliate
- (TW) Two-way affiliate player
- Injured

Roster
Updated: November 17, 2026

== Standings ==
=== Division ===
Southeast Division	W	L	PCT	GB	Home	Road	Div	GP
Miami Heat	9	6	.600	–	5‍–‍3	4‍–‍3	1–1	15
Atlanta Hawks	9	6	.600	–	3‍–‍3	6‍–‍3	4–1	15
Orlando Magic	6	8	.429	2.5	1‍–‍5	5‍–‍3	0–2	14
Washington Wizards	5	11	.313	4.5	2‍–‍5	3‍–‍6	2–3	16
Charlotte Hornets	4	10	.286	4.5	3‍–‍4	1‍–‍6	2–2	14

=== Conference ===
Eastern Conference
#	Team	W	L	PCT	GB	GP
1	Philadelphia 76ers *	13	3	.813	–	16
2	Boston Celtics	11	4	.733	1.5	15
3	Detroit Pistons *	10	4	.714	2.0	14
4	Miami Heat *	9	6	.600	3.5	15
5	Atlanta Hawks	9	6	.600	3.5	15
6	New York Knicks	9	6	.600	3.5	15
7	Cleveland Cavaliers	8	8	.500	5.0	16
8	Orlando Magic	6	8	.429	6.0	14
9	Toronto Raptors	5	10	.333	7.5	15
10	Indiana Pacers	5	10	.333	7.5	15
11	Washington Wizards	5	11	.313	8.0	16
12	Charlotte Hornets	4	10	.286	8.0	14
13	Chicago Bulls	4	10	.286	8.0	14
14	Brooklyn Nets	3	11	.214	9.0	14
15	Milwaukee Bucks	1	15	.063	12.0	16

== Game log ==
=== Preseason ===
2026 preseason game log
Total: 4–1 (Home: 1–1; Road: 3–0)
Preseason: 4–1 (home: 1–1; road: 3–0)

Game	Date	Team	Score	High points	High rebounds	High assists	Location Attendance	Record
1	October 5	Memphis	L 123–132	Corey Kispert (19)	Asa Newell (12)	Tied (3)	State Farm Arena; 10,923	0–1
2	October 8	@ San Antonio	W 123–116	Asa Newell (16)	Dyson Daniels (11)	Flemings, Okongwu (5)	Frost Bank Center; 18,354	1–1
3	October 10	@ Indiana	W 119–117	Jalen Johnson (20)	Jalen Johnson (7)	Daniels, Dennis (4)	Gainbridge Fieldhouse; 11,002	2–1
4	October 12	Oklahoma City	W 113–110	Jock Landale (17)	Asa Newell (10)	Dennis, Flemings (7)	State Farm Arena; 15,446	3–1
5	October 16	@ Dallas	W 135–111	Nickeil Alexander-Walker (25)	Jalen Johnson (14)	Kingston Flemings (6)	American Airlines Center; 19,178	4–1

2026–27 preseason schedule

=== Regular season ===
2026–27 game log
Total: 10–6 (Home: 4–3; Road: 6–3)
October: 3–4 (home: 1–2; road: 2–2)

Game	Date	Team	Score	High points	High rebounds	High assists	Location Attendance	Record
1	October 21	@ Orlando	W 132–125	Nickeil Alexander-Walker (31)	Jalen Johnson (14)	Onyeka Okongwu (7)	Kia Center; 18,864	1–0
2	October 23	@ Charlotte	W 128–81	Johnson, Wiggins (19)	Dyson Daniels (9)	Flemings, Johnson (8)	Spectrum Center; 19,524	2–0
3	October 24	Houston	L 114–121	Jalen Johnson (26)	Jalen Johnson (9)	Jalen Johnson (16)	State Farm Arena; 17,962	2–1
4	October 26	@ Houston	L 110–120	Jalen Johnson (21)	Johnson, Okongwu (9)	Tied (4)	Toyota Center; 18,055	2–2
5	October 28	Miami	L 117–129	Alexander-Walker, Flemings (23)	Jalen Johnson (9)	Jalen Johnson (11)	State Farm Arena; 15,028	2–3
6	October 29	Cleveland	W 114–111	Onyeka Okongwu (29)	Onyeka Okongwu (12)	CJ McCollum (8)	State Farm Arena; 15,025	3–3
7	October 31	@ New Orleans	L 99–121	CJ McCollum (14)	Onyeka Okongwu (10)	Kingston Flemings (6)	Smoothie King Center; 15,366	3–4

November: 7–2 (home: 3–1; road: 4–1)

Game	Date	Team	Score	High points	High rebounds	High assists	Location Attendance	Record
8	November 2	@ Indiana	W 108–104	Nickeil Alexander-Walker (34)	Onyeka Okongwu (10)	CJ McCollum (11)	Gainbridge Fieldhouse; 16,058	4–4
9	November 4	@ Washington	W 120–105	Nickeil Alexander-Walker (26)	Dyson Daniels (17)	Dyson Daniels (8)	Capital One Arena; 16,974	5–4
10	November 6	Washington	W 139–132	Nickeil Alexander-Walker (26)	Daniels, Okongwu (9)	Dyson Daniels (12)	State Farm Arena; 15,538	6–4
11	November 7	Brooklyn	W 124–121	Jalen Johnson (30)	Dyson Daniels (10)	Dyson Daniels (7)	State Farm Arena; 16,117	7–4
12	November 9	L.A. Lakers	L 114–124	CJ McCollum (21)	Onyeka Okongwu (9)	Dyson Daniels (8)	State Farm Arena; 15,561	7–5
13	November 13	@ Chicago	L 117–125 (OT)	Jalen Johnson (27)	Jalen Johnson (11)	Jalen Johnson (10)	United Center; 19,466	7–6
14	November 15	@ Milwaukee	W 113–106	Alexander-Walker, McCollum (20)	Johnson, Okongwu (11)	Daniels, Johnson (5)	Fiserv Forum; 11,474	8–6
15	November 18	@ Oklahoma City	W 117–112	Onyeka Okongwu (28)	Jalen Johnson (12)	Jalen Johnson (11)	Paycom Center; 18,203	9–6
16	November 20	Charlotte	W 111–97	Jalen Johnson (26)	Dyson Daniels (8)	Dyson Daniels (10)	State Farm Arena; 15,488	10–6
17	November 22	Detroit					State Farm Arena	–
18	November 27	@ Boston					TD Garden	–
19	November 29	@ New York					Madison Square Garden	–

December: 0–0 (home: 0–0; road: 0–0)

Game	Date	Team	Score	High points	High rebounds	High assists	Location Attendance	Record
20	December 1	@ Miami					Kaseya Center	–
21	December 3	Indiana					State Farm Arena	–
22	December	TBD					TBD	–
23	December	TBD					TBD	–
24	December 12	@ Portland					Moda Center	–
25	December 14	@ Phoenix					Mortgage Matchup Center	–
26	December 17	@ Denver					Ball Arena	–
27	December 19	Orlando					State Farm Arena	–
28	December 20	Oklahoma City					State Farm Arena	–
29	December 23	Detroit					State Farm Arena	–
30	December 26	Charlotte					State Farm Arena	–
31	December 27	@ San Antonio					Frost Bank Center	–
32	December 29	Chicago					State Farm Arena	–
33	December 31	Milwaukee					State Farm Arena	–

January: 0–0 (home: 0–0; road: 0–0)

Game	Date	Team	Score	High points	High rebounds	High assists	Location Attendance	Record
34	January 2	Dallas					State Farm Arena	–
35	January 4	@ Philadelphia					Xfinity Mobile Arena	–
36	January 5	@ Charlotte					Spectrum Center	–
37	January 7	Indiana					State Farm Arena	–
38	January 10	San Antonio					State Farm Arena	–
39	January 11	@ Washington					Capital One Arena	–
40	January 13	Cleveland					State Farm Arena	–
41	January 15	Golden State					State Farm Arena	–
42	January 18	Philadelphia					State Farm Arena	–
43	January 20	Portland					State Farm Arena	–
44	January 22	New York					State Farm Arena	–
45	January 23	@ Miami					Kaseya Center	–
46	January 26	@ Detroit					Little Caesars Arena	–
47	January 28	@ New York					Madison Square Garden	–
48	January 30	@ Milwaukee					Fiserv Forum	–

February: 0–0 (home: 0–0; road: 0–0)

Game	Date	Team	Score	High points	High rebounds	High assists	Location Attendance	Record
49	February 1	Washington					State Farm Arena	–
50	February 3	@ Indiana					Gainbridge Fieldhouse	–
51	February 5	Boston					State Farm Arena	–
52	February 7	Denver					State Farm Arena	–
53	February 8	Miami					State Farm Arena	–
54	February 10	New Orleans					State Farm Arena	–
55	February 12	Phoenix					State Farm Arena	–
56	February 14	Sacramento					State Farm Arena	–
57	February 16	Toronto					State Farm Arena	–
58	February 17	@ Brooklyn					Barclays Center	–
All-Star Game
59	February 25	@ Chicago					United Center	–
60	February 26	@ Toronto					Scotiabank Arena	–
61	February 28	@ Orlando					Kia Center	–

March: 0–0 (home: 0–0; road: 0–0)

Game	Date	Team	Score	High points	High rebounds	High assists	Location Attendance	Record
62	March 3	Chicago					State Farm Arena	–
63	March 4	Memphis					State Farm Arena	–
64	March 6	@ Cleveland					Rocket Arena	–
65	March 8	@ Memphis					FedExForum	–
66	March 10	@ Minnesota					Target Center	–
67	March 11	Brooklyn					State Farm Arena	–
68	March 13	Orlando					State Farm Arena	–
69	March 15	@ Dallas					American Airlines Center	–
70	March 17	@ Utah					Delta Center	–
71	March 19	@ L.A. Lakers					Crypto.com Arena	–
72	March 20	@ L.A. Clippers					Intuit Dome	–
73	March 22	@ Golden State					Chase Center	–
74	March 24	@ Sacramento					Golden 1 Center	–
75	March 27	Utah					State Farm Arena	–
76	March 29	Minnesota					State Farm Arena	–
77	March 31	L.A. Clippers					State Farm Arena	–

April: 0–0 (home: 0–0; road: 0–0)

Game	Date	Team	Score	High points	High rebounds	High assists	Location Attendance	Record
78	April 2	@ Toronto					Scotiabank Arena	–
79	April 4	@ Philadelphia					Xfinity Mobile Arena	–
80	April 6	New York					State Farm Arena	–
81	April 9	Boston					State Farm Arena	–
82	April 11	@ Cleveland					Rocket Arena	–

2026–27 season schedule

== NBA Cup ==
=== East Group C ===
Pos	Team	Pld	W	L	PF	PA	PD	Qualification
1	Boston Celtics	2	2	0	244	191	+53	Advance to knockout stage
2	Atlanta Hawks	3	2	1	360	339	+21	Possible knockout stage based on ranking
3	Washington Wizards	3	2	1	325	312	+13	
4	Chicago Bulls	3	1	2	315	333	−18	
5	Charlotte Hornets	3	0	3	256	325	−69	

Updated to game(s) played on November 20, 2026. Source:

== Transactions ==
=== Trades ===
Date	Trade		Ref.
June 24, 2026	To Atlanta Hawks: Draft rights to Henri Veesaar (No. 52)	To Los Angeles Clippers: Draft rights to Narcisse Ngoy (No. 57); Cash considerations	
June 30, 2026	To Atlanta Hawks: Devin Carter; 2033 SAC second-round pick	To Sacramento Kings: Draft rights to Alpha Kaba (2017 No. 60)	
July 6, 2026	To Atlanta Hawks: Aaron Wiggins	To Oklahoma City Thunder: 2030 ATL second-round pick; 2032 second-round pick	
July 19, 2026	Three-team trade		
July 19, 2026	To Atlanta Hawks: Luguentz Dort (from Oklahoma City); Ryan Nembhard (from Dallas)	To Dallas Mavericks: Zaccharie Risacher (from Atlanta); Protected second-round pick (from Atlanta)	
July 19, 2026	To Oklahoma City Thunder: 2027 CHI second-round pick (from Dallas); 2031 second-round pick (from Atlanta); 2032 second-round pick (from Atlanta)		
September 22, 2026	To Atlanta Hawks: Dorian Finney-Smith	To Charlotte Hornets: Buddy Hield; Ryan Nembhard; Cash considerations	

=== Free agency ===
==== Re-signed ====
Date	Player	Signed	Ref.
June 22, 2026	CJ McCollum	1 year, $21 million	
June 30, 2026	Jock Landale	1 year, $14 million	

==== Additions ====
Date	Player	Signed	Former Team	Ref.
July 20, 2026	Jalen Wilson	Two-way contract	Brooklyn Nets	

==== Subtractions ====
Player	Reason	New Team	Ref.
Tony Bradley	Free Agent	New York Knicks	
Jonathan Kuminga	Free Agent	Minnesota Timberwolves	
Christian Koloko	Free Agent	New Orleans Pelicans	
Gabe Vincent	Free Agent		
Jacob Toppin	Free Agent	(Israel) Hapoel Tel Aviv	
Keaton Wallace	Free Agent	(Israel) Maccabi Tel Aviv	
