= 2025–26 Atlanta Hawks season =

2025–26 NBA season by team

- Division champions
- Head coach: Quin Snyder
- General manager: Onsi Saleh
- Owner: Tony Ressler
- Arena: State Farm Arena

Results
- Record: 46–36 (.561)
- Place: Division: 1st (Southeast); Conference: 6th (Eastern)
- Playoff finish: First round (lost to Knicks 2–4)
- Stats at Basketball Reference

Local media
- Television: FanDuel Sports Network South; FanDuel Sports Network Southeast; WANF-TV & Peachtree Sports Network (11 simulcasts)
- Radio: 92.9 FM "The Game"

The 2025–26 Atlanta Hawks season was the 77th season of the franchise in the National Basketball Association (NBA) and 58th in Atlanta.

This was former All-Star and franchise icon Trae Young's final season with the Hawks, as he was traded to the Washington Wizards on January 9, 2026, in exchange for CJ McCollum and Corey Kispert. Following Young’s injury during the game against the Brooklyn Nets on October 29, the Hawks' performance metrics improved, establishing a pattern of success without him before his trade. Forward Jalen Johnson earned his first NBA All-Star selection in February 2026.

There was controversy on the season when the team announced a Magic City night, in partnership with the famous Atlanta strip club. However, the NBA cancelled the planned night after outrage and concern from many across the league.

After seemingly looking to be in the play-in tournament for a fifth consecutive season with a 26–30 record, the Hawks suddenly exploded after the All-Star Break, going 20–6 and had an 11-game winning streak, which is tied for the fourth longest in franchise history. With their win against the Detroit Pistons on March 25, the Hawks surpassed their win total from the 2024–25 season. Atlanta clinched a playoff berth and the Southeast Division title on April 10 with a win over the Cleveland Cavaliers for the first time since the 2022–23 season and first to do so without entering the play-in since 2020–21 season. They finished the regular season with a 46–36 record, the same as the Toronto Raptors, and secured the sixth seed in the Eastern Conference since they lost the tiebreaker to Toronto via a 0–4 season series sweep.

The Hawks faced the third-seeded (and eventual NBA champion) New York Knicks in the first round of the playoffs. Despite taking a 2–1 lead in the series, the Hawks would suffer three straight blowout losses, including a season-ending Game 6 where they set an NBA playoff record for the largest halftime deficit (47 points), resulting in a 51-point defeat that marked the franchise's worst playoff loss since 1956.

== Draft ==
Round	Pick	Player	Position	Nationality	College
1	13	Derik Queen	Center	United States	Maryland
1	22	Drake Powell	Shooting Guard	United States	North Carolina

The Hawks entered the draft with only two first-round selections, both acquired through various trades. They later traded both picks to the New Orleans Pelicans and to the Brooklyn Nets, respectively.

The Hawks had previously traded their original first- and second-round picks to the San Antonio Spurs and the Oklahoma City Thunder, respectively.

== Roster ==
2025–26 Atlanta Hawks roster
Players

Pos.	No.	Player	Height	Weight	DOB	From
G	7	Nickeil Alexander-Walker	6 ft 5 in (1.96 m)	205 lb (93 kg)	1998-09-02	Virginia Tech
C	13	Tony Bradley	6 ft 10 in (2.08 m)	250 lb (113 kg)	1998-01-08	North Carolina
G	5	Dyson Daniels	6 ft 7 in (2.01 m)	199 lb (90 kg)	2003-03-17	Australia
G	00	RayJ Dennis (TW)	6 ft 1 in (1.85 m)	180 lb (82 kg)	2001-03-30	Baylor
G	51	Keshon Gilbert (TW)	6 ft 4 in (1.93 m)	200 lb (91 kg)	2003-06-30	Iowa State
F	18	Mouhamed Gueye	6 ft 11 in (2.11 m)	210 lb (95 kg)	2002-11-09	Washington State
G	8	Buddy Hield	6 ft 4 in (1.93 m)	220 lb (100 kg)	1992-12-17	Oklahoma
F	1	Jalen Johnson	6 ft 8 in (2.03 m)	219 lb (99 kg)	2001-12-18	Duke
F	24	Corey Kispert	6 ft 6 in (1.98 m)	224 lb (102 kg)	1999-03-03	Gonzaga
C	35	Christian Koloko (TW)	6 ft 11 in (2.11 m)	225 lb (102 kg)	2000-06-20	Arizona
F	0	Jonathan Kuminga	6 ft 7 in (2.01 m)	225 lb (102 kg)	2002-10-06	The Patrick School (NJ)
C	31	Jock Landale	6 ft 11 in (2.11 m)	255 lb (116 kg)	1995-10-25	Saint Mary's
G	3	CJ McCollum	6 ft 3 in (1.91 m)	190 lb (86 kg)	1991-09-19	Lehigh
F	14	Asa Newell	6 ft 10 in (2.08 m)	220 lb (100 kg)	2005-10-05	Georgia
F/C	17	Onyeka Okongwu	6 ft 10 in (2.08 m)	240 lb (109 kg)	2000-12-11	USC
F	10	Zaccharie Risacher	6 ft 8 in (2.03 m)	200 lb (91 kg)	2005-04-08	France
G	4	Gabe Vincent	6 ft 2 in (1.88 m)	200 lb (91 kg)	1996-06-14	UC Santa Barbara
G	2	Keaton Wallace	6 ft 3 in (1.91 m)	185 lb (84 kg)	1999-02-26	UTSA

Coaches
Head coach
- Quin Snyder
Assistant(s)
- Bryan Bailey
- Mike Brey
- Steve Klei
- Antonio Lang
- Sanjay Lumpkin
- Ronald Nored
- Reggis Onwukamuche
- Ryan Schmidt
- Ashton Smith
- Ekpe Udoh
- Jett Watkinson

Legend
- (DP) Unsigned draft pick
- (FA) Free agent
- (S) Suspended
- (GL) On assignment to G League affiliate
- (TW) Two-way affiliate player
- Injured

Roster
Updated: April 4, 2026

== Standings ==
=== Division ===
Southeast Division	W	L	PCT	GB	Home	Road	Div	GP
y – Atlanta Hawks	46	36	.561	–	24‍–‍17	22‍–‍19	9‍–‍7	82
x – Orlando Magic	45	37	.549	1.0	26‍–‍16	19‍–‍21	9‍–‍8	82
pi – Charlotte Hornets	44	38	.537	2.0	21‍–‍20	23‍–‍18	11‍–‍5	82
pi – Miami Heat	43	39	.524	3.0	26‍–‍15	17‍–‍24	10‍–‍7	82
Washington Wizards	17	65	.207	29.0	11‍–‍30	6‍–‍35	2‍–‍14	82

=== Conference ===
Eastern Conference
#	Team	W	L	PCT	GB	GP
1	c – Detroit Pistons *	60	22	.732	–	82
2	y – Boston Celtics *	56	26	.683	4.0	82
3	x – New York Knicks	53	29	.646	7.0	82
4	x – Cleveland Cavaliers	52	30	.634	8.0	82
5	x – Toronto Raptors	46	36	.561	14.0	82
6	y – Atlanta Hawks *	46	36	.561	14.0	82
7	x – Philadelphia 76ers	45	37	.549	15.0	82
8	x – Orlando Magic	45	37	.549	15.0	82
9	pi – Charlotte Hornets	44	38	.537	16.0	82
10	pi – Miami Heat	43	39	.524	17.0	82
11	Milwaukee Bucks	32	50	.390	28.0	82
12	Chicago Bulls	31	51	.378	29.0	82
13	Brooklyn Nets	20	62	.244	40.0	82
14	Indiana Pacers	19	63	.232	41.0	82
15	Washington Wizards	17	65	.207	43.0	82

== Game log ==
=== Preseason ===
2025 preseason game log
Total: 2–2 (Home: 1–1; Road: 1–1)
Preseason: 1–2 (home: 1–1; road: 0–1)

Game	Date	Team	Score	High points	High rebounds	High assists	Location Attendance	Record
1	October 6	@ Houston	L 113–122	Nickeil Alexander-Walker (13)	N'Faly Dante (10)	Trae Young (8)	Toyota Center; 15,995	0–1
2	October 11	@ Memphis	W 122–116	Jalen Johnson (20)	Daniels, Johnson, Porziņģis (7)	Trae Young (8)	FedExForum; 14,260	1–1
3	October 13	Miami	W 119–118 (OT)	Jacob Toppin (26)	Charles Bassey (17)	Butler, Toppin (5)	State Farm Arena; 12,713	2–1
4	October 16	Houston	L 115–133	Zaccharie Risacher (24)	Kristaps Porziņģis (13)	Trae Young (10)	State Farm Arena; 15,678	2–2

2025–26 preseason schedule

=== Regular season ===
2025–26 game log
Total: 46–36 (Home: 24–17; Road: 22–19)
October: 3–3 (home: 0–2; road: 3–1)

Game	Date	Team	Score	High points	High rebounds	High assists	Location Attendance	Record
1	October 22	Toronto	L 118–138	Johnson, Young (22)	Johnson, Porziņģis (7)	Jalen Johnson (8)	State Farm Arena; 17,811	0–1
2	October 24	@ Orlando	W 111–107	Trae Young (25)	Gueye, Johnson (8)	Trae Young (6)	Kia Center; 18,004	1–1
3	October 25	Oklahoma City	L 100–117	Nickeil Alexander-Walker (17)	Onyeka Okongwu (12)	Trae Young (10)	State Farm Arena; 16,450	1–2
4	October 27	@ Chicago	L 123–128	Kristaps Porziņģis (27)	Onyeka Okongwu (10)	Trae Young (17)	United Center; 18,094	1–3
5	October 29	@ Brooklyn	W 117–112	Jalen Johnson (23)	Onyeka Okongwu (14)	Kristaps Porziņģis (7)	Barclays Center; 17,548	2–3
6	October 31	@ Indiana	W 128–108	Jalen Johnson (22)	Jalen Johnson (13)	Jalen Johnson (8)	Gainbridge Fieldhouse; 16,212	3–3

November: 9–5 (home: 3–2; road: 6–3)

Game	Date	Team	Score	High points	High rebounds	High assists	Location Attendance	Record
7	November 2	@ Cleveland	L 109–117	Jalen Johnson (23)	Jalen Johnson (13)	Tied (5)	Rocket Arena; 19,432	3–4
8	November 4	Orlando	W 127–112	Zaccharie Risacher (21)	Onyeka Okongwu (7)	Dyson Daniels (6)	State Farm Arena; 15,821	4–4
9	November 7	Toronto	L 97–109	Jalen Johnson (21)	Onyeka Okongwu (11)	Dyson Daniels (8)	State Farm Arena; 16,340	4–5
10	November 8	L.A. Lakers	W 122–102	Mouhamed Gueye (21)	Daniels, Okongwu (8)	Dyson Daniels (13)	State Farm Arena; 17,194	5–5
11	November 10	@ L.A. Clippers	W 105–102	Vít Krejčí (28)	Jalen Johnson (10)	Daniels, Johnson (8)	Intuit Dome; 16,368	6–5
12	November 12	@ Sacramento	W 133–100	Jalen Johnson (24)	Jalen Johnson (10)	Daniels, Johnson (8)	Golden 1 Center; 15,008	7–5
13	November 13	@ Utah	W 132–122	Onyeka Okongwu (32)	Jalen Johnson (18)	Jalen Johnson (14)	Delta Center; 18,186	8–5
14	November 16	@ Phoenix	W 124–122	Onyeka Okongwu (27)	Jalen Johnson (10)	Dyson Daniels (12)	Mortgage Matchup Center; 17,071	9–5
15	November 18	Detroit	L 112–120	Jalen Johnson (25)	Mouhamed Gueye (11)	Jalen Johnson (9)	State Farm Arena; 17,353	9–6
16	November 20	@ San Antonio	L 126–135	Nickeil Alexander-Walker (38)	Jalen Johnson (12)	Jalen Johnson (7)	Frost Bank Center; 18,354	9–7
17	November 22	@ New Orleans	W 115–98	Kristaps Porziņģis (29)	Jalen Johnson (11)	Jalen Johnson (9)	Smoothie King Center; 18,397	10–7
18	November 23	Charlotte	W 113–110	Jalen Johnson (28)	Dyson Daniels (9)	Jalen Johnson (11)	State Farm Arena; 17,460	11–7
19	November 25	@ Washington	L 113–132	Kristaps Porziņģis (22)	Dyson Daniels (9)	Dyson Daniels (7)	Capital One Arena; 15,522	11–8
20	November 28	Cleveland	W 130–123	Nickeil Alexander-Walker (30)	Jalen Johnson (12)	Jalen Johnson (12)	State Farm Arena; 16,124	12–8
21	November 30	@ Philadelphia	W 142–134 (2OT)	Jalen Johnson (41)	Jalen Johnson (14)	Dyson Daniels (8)	Xfinity Mobile Arena; 17,225	13–8

December: 3–11 (home: 2–7; road: 1–4)

Game	Date	Team	Score	High points	High rebounds	High assists	Location Attendance	Record
22	December 1	@ Detroit	L 98–99	Jalen Johnson (29)	Jalen Johnson (13)	Jalen Johnson (7)	Little Caesars Arena; 19,008	13–9
23	December 3	L.A. Clippers	L 92–115	Nickeil Alexander-Walker (21)	Onyeka Okongwu (9)	Onyeka Okongwu (5)	State Farm Arena; 16,470	13–10
24	December 5	Denver	L 133–134	Nickeil Alexander-Walker (30)	Jalen Johnson (18)	Jalen Johnson (16)	State Farm Arena; 16,149	13–11
25	December 6	@ Washington	W 131–116	Jalen Johnson (30)	Jalen Johnson (12)	Jalen Johnson (12)	Capital One Arena; 15,596	14–11
26	December 12	@ Detroit	L 115–142	Nickeil Alexander-Walker (22)	Jalen Johnson (11)	Jalen Johnson (12)	Little Caesars Arena; 18,989	14–12
27	December 14	Philadelphia	W 120–117	Dyson Daniels (27)	Onyeka Okongwu (15)	Jalen Johnson (12)	State Farm Arena; 16,250	15–12
28	December 18	@ Charlotte	L 126–133	Jalen Johnson (43)	Jalen Johnson (11)	Trae Young (10)	Spectrum Center; 16,124	15–13
29	December 19	San Antonio	L 98–126	Nickeil Alexander-Walker (23)	Jalen Johnson (11)	Jalen Johnson (6)	State Farm Arena; 15,505	15–14
30	December 21	Chicago	L 150–152	Jalen Johnson (36)	Jalen Johnson (11)	Tied (9)	State Farm Arena; 15,110	15–15
31	December 23	Chicago	L 123–126	Jalen Johnson (24)	Jalen Johnson (9)	Trae Young (15)	State Farm Arena; 15,367	15–16
32	December 26	Miami	L 111–126	Trae Young (30)	Jalen Johnson (9)	Jalen Johnson (10)	State Farm Arena; 15,664	15–17
33	December 27	New York	L 125–128	Onyeka Okongwu (31)	Onyeka Okongwu (14)	Jalen Johnson (12)	State Farm Arena; 17,809	15–18
34	December 29	@ Oklahoma City	L 129–140	Nickeil Alexander-Walker (30)	Onyeka Okongwu (14)	Dyson Daniels (7)	Paycom Center; 18,203	15–19
35	December 31	Minnesota	W 126–102	Jalen Johnson (34)	Jalen Johnson (10)	Dyson Daniels (9)	State Farm Arena; 16,345	16–19

January: 8–8 (home: 3–3; road: 5–5)

Game	Date	Team	Score	High points	High rebounds	High assists	Location Attendance	Record
36	January 2	@ New York	W 111–99	Alexander-Walker, Okongwu (23)	Jalen Johnson (10)	Jalen Johnson (11)	Madison Square Garden; 19,812	17–19
37	January 3	@ Toronto	L 117–134	Jalen Johnson (30)	Johnson, Risacher (7)	Dyson Daniels (12)	Scotiabank Arena; 19,028	17–20
38	January 5	@ Toronto	L 100–118	Onyeka Okongwu (17)	Jalen Johnson (14)	Jalen Johnson (7)	Scotiabank Arena; 17,194	17–21
39	January 7	New Orleans	W 117–100	Zaccharie Risacher (25)	Mouhamed Gueye (11)	Dyson Daniels (8)	State Farm Arena; 15,993	18–21
40	January 9	@ Denver	W 110–87	Jalen Johnson (29)	Dyson Daniels (11)	Dyson Daniels (10)	Ball Arena; 19,650	19–21
41	January 11	@ Golden State	W 124–111	Nickeil Alexander-Walker (24)	Onyeka Okongwu (12)	Dyson Daniels (9)	Chase Center; 18,064	20–21
42	January 13	@ L.A. Lakers	L 116–141	Nickeil Alexander-Walker (26)	Daniels, Okongwu (8)	Jalen Johnson (6)	Crypto.com Arena; 18,757	20–22
43	January 15	@ Portland	L 101–117	Onyeka Okongwu (26)	Jalen Johnson (11)	Nickeil Alexander-Walker (7)	Moda Center; 16,196	20–23
44	January 17	Boston	L 106–132	Onyeka Okongwu (21)	Jalen Johnson (8)	Nickeil Alexander-Walker (6)	State Farm Arena; 17,489	20–24
45	January 19	Milwaukee	L 110–112	Nickeil Alexander-Walker (32)	Jalen Johnson (16)	Dyson Daniels (10)	State Farm Arena; 16,284	20–25
46	January 21	@ Memphis	W 124–122	Jalen Johnson (32)	Jalen Johnson (15)	Daniels, Johnson (8)	FedExForum; 15,054	21–25
47	January 23	Phoenix	W 110–103	Onyeka Okongwu (25)	Jalen Johnson (18)	Jalen Johnson (9)	State Farm Arena; 15,461	22–25
48	January 26	Indiana	W 132–116	CJ McCollum (23)	Onyeka Okongwu (10)	Dyson Daniels (9)	State Farm Arena; 12,210	23–25
49	January 28	@ Boston	W 117–106	Nickeil Alexander-Walker (21)	Jalen Johnson (14)	Dyson Daniels (9)	TD Garden; 19,156	24–25
50	January 29	Houston	L 86–104	CJ McCollum (23)	Tied (7)	Dyson Daniels (7)	State Farm Arena; 16,602	24–26
51	January 31	@ Indiana	L 124–129	Jalen Johnson (33)	Jalen Johnson (11)	Jalen Johnson (10)	Gainbridge Fieldhouse; 17,010	24–27

February: 6–4 (home: 4–2; road: 2–2)

Game	Date	Team	Score	High points	High rebounds	High assists	Location Attendance	Record
52	February 3	@ Miami	W 127–115	Jalen Johnson (29)	Jalen Johnson (11)	Jalen Johnson (11)	Kaseya Center; 19,700	25–27
53	February 5	Utah	W 121–119	Jock Landale (26)	Jalen Johnson (16)	Jalen Johnson (15)	State Farm Arena; 15,412	26–27
54	February 7	Charlotte	L 119–126	Jalen Johnson (31)	Jalen Johnson (9)	Nickeil Alexander-Walker (10)	State Farm Arena; 17,492	26–28
55	February 9	@ Minnesota	L 116–138	CJ McCollum (38)	Nickeil Alexander-Walker (12)	Nickeil Alexander-Walker (5)	Target Center; 17,243	26–29
56	February 11	@ Charlotte	L 107–110	Dyson Daniels (21)	Jalen Johnson (13)	Jalen Johnson (9)	Spectrum Center; 18,710	26–30
All-Star Game
57	February 19	@ Philadelphia	W 117–107	Jalen Johnson (32)	Johnson, Okongwu (10)	Johnson, McCollum (5)	Xfinity Mobile Arena; 19,746	27–30
58	February 20	Miami	L 97–128	Onyeka Okongwu (22)	Jalen Johnson (16)	Jalen Johnson (11)	State Farm Arena; 16,070	27–31
59	February 22	Brooklyn	W 115–104	Jalen Johnson (26)	Jalen Johnson (12)	Dyson Daniels (8)	State Farm Arena; 17,121	28–31
60	February 24	Washington	W 119–98	Jonathan Kuminga (27)	Mouhamed Gueye (11)	Daniels, Okongwu (7)	State Farm Arena; 15,417	29–31
61	February 26	Washington	W 126–96	Corey Kispert (33)	Onyeka Okongwu (11)	Dyson Daniels (11)	State Farm Arena; 15,828	30–31

March: 12–2 (home: 9–0; road: 3–2)

Game	Date	Team	Score	High points	High rebounds	High assists	Location Attendance	Record
62	March 1	Portland	W 135–101	Onyeka Okongwu (25)	Onyeka Okongwu (10)	Jalen Johnson (8)	State Farm Arena; 15,498	31–31
63	March 4	@ Milwaukee	W 131–113	Nickeil Alexander-Walker (23)	Dyson Daniels (10)	Jalen Johnson (9)	Fiserv Forum; 14,889	32–31
64	March 7	Philadelphia	W 125–116	Jalen Johnson (35)	Jalen Johnson (10)	Johnson, McCollum (7)	State Farm Arena; 17,174	33–31
65	March 10	Dallas	W 124–112	Nickeil Alexander-Walker (29)	McCollum, Okongwu (9)	Dyson Daniels (10)	State Farm Arena; 15,514	34–31
66	March 12	Brooklyn	W 108–97	Jalen Johnson (21)	Tied (9)	Jalen Johnson (9)	State Farm Arena; 15,526	35–31
67	March 14	Milwaukee	W 122–99	CJ McCollum (30)	Jalen Johnson (10)	Jalen Johnson (12)	State Farm Arena; 16,013	36–31
68	March 16	Orlando	W 124–112	Nickeil Alexander-Walker (41)	Jalen Johnson (15)	Jalen Johnson (13)	State Farm Arena; 18,138	37–31
69	March 18	@ Dallas	W 135–120	CJ McCollum (24)	Jalen Johnson (11)	Jalen Johnson (9)	American Airlines Center; 19,807	38–31
70	March 20	@ Houston	L 95–117	Nickeil Alexander-Walker (21)	Onyeka Okongwu (8)	Nickeil Alexander-Walker (4)	Toyota Center; 18,055	38–32
71	March 21	Golden State	W 126–110	Dyson Daniels (28)	Mouhamed Gueye (10)	Dyson Daniels (6)	State Farm Arena; 17,069	39–32
72	March 23	Memphis	W 146–107	Nickeil Alexander-Walker (26)	Zaccharie Risacher (8)	CJ McCollum (9)	State Farm Arena; 16,131	40–32
73	March 25	@ Detroit	W 130–129 (OT)	Johnson, McCollum (27)	Dyson Daniels (13)	Jalen Johnson (12)	Little Caesars Arena; 18,921	41–32
74	March 27	@ Boston	L 102–109	Jalen Johnson (29)	Onyeka Okongwu (9)	Jalen Johnson (6)	TD Garden; 19,156	41–33
75	March 28	Sacramento	W 123–113	Nickeil Alexander-Walker (27)	Jock Landale (13)	Jalen Johnson (10)	State Farm Arena; 17,066	42–33
76	March 30	Boston	W 112–102	Johnson, Okongwu (20)	Jalen Johnson (12)	Alexander-Walker, McCollum (6)	State Farm Arena; 17,092	43–33

April: 3–3 (home: 1–1; road: 2–2)

Game	Date	Team	Score	High points	High rebounds	High assists	Location Attendance	Record
77	April 1	@ Orlando	W 130–101	Nickeil Alexander-Walker (32)	Jalen Johnson (14)	Jalen Johnson (8)	Kia Center; 17,324	44–33
78	April 3	@ Brooklyn	W 141–107	CJ McCollum (25)	Jalen Johnson (11)	CJ McCollum (7)	Barclays Center; 17,548	45–33
79	April 6	New York	L 105–108	Nickeil Alexander-Walker (36)	Dyson Daniels (12)	CJ McCollum (6)	State Farm Arena; 17,242	45–34
80	April 8	@ Cleveland	L 116–122	Nickeil Alexander-Walker (25)	Jalen Johnson (11)	Daniels, Johnson (6)	Rocket Arena; 19,432	45–35
81	April 10	Cleveland	W 124–102	CJ McCollum (29)	Dyson Daniels (10)	Dyson Daniels (12)	State Farm Arena; 17,517	46–35
82	April 12	@ Miami	L 117–143	Buddy Hield (31)	Asa Newell (11)	Keshon Gilbert (9)	Kaseya Center; 19,962	46–36

2025–26 season schedule

=== Playoffs ===
2026 playoff game log
Total: 2–4 (home: 1–2; road: 1–2)
First Round: 2–4 (home: 1–2; road: 1–2)

Game	Date	Team	Score	High points	High rebounds	High assists	Location Attendance	Series
1	April 18	@ New York	L 102–113	CJ McCollum (26)	Dyson Daniels (9)	Dyson Daniels (11)	Madison Square Garden; 19,812	0–1
2	April 20	@ New York	W 107–106	CJ McCollum (32)	Johnson, Okongwu (8)	Alexander-Walker, McCollum (6)	Madison Square Garden; 19,812	1–1
3	April 23	New York	W 109–108	Jalen Johnson (24)	Dyson Daniels (13)	Jalen Johnson (8)	State Farm Arena; 18,452	2–1
4	April 25	New York	L 98–114	CJ McCollum (17)	Dyson Daniels (9)	Dyson Daniels (6)	State Farm Arena; 18,763	2–2
5	April 28	@ New York	L 97–126	Jalen Johnson (18)	Jalen Johnson (10)	Jalen Johnson (6)	Madison Square Garden; 19,812	2–3
6	April 30	New York	L 89–140	Jalen Johnson (21)	Jalen Johnson (8)	Jalen Johnson (6)	State Farm Arena; 17,685	2–4

2026 playoff schedule

=== NBA Cup ===
==== East Group A ====
Pos	Team	Pld	W	L	PF	PA	PD	Qualification
1	Toronto Raptors	4	4	0	458	403	+55	Advanced to knockout rounds
2	Atlanta Hawks	4	2	2	468	472	−4	
3	Cleveland Cavaliers	4	2	2	492	466	+26	
4	Indiana Pacers	4	1	3	431	431	0	
5	Washington Wizards	4	1	3	443	520	−77	

Source: NBA

== Player statistics ==
Legend
GP	Games played	GS	Games started	MPG	Minutes per game
FG%	Field-goal percentage	3P%	3-point field-goal percentage	FT%	Free-throw percentage
RPG	Rebounds per game	APG	Assists per game	SPG	Steals per game
BPG	Blocks per game	PPG	Points per game

=== Regular season ===
Player	GP	GS	MPG	FG%	3P%	FT%	RPG	APG	SPG	BPG	PPG
Nickeil Alexander-Walker	78	71	33.4	.459	.399	.902	3.4	3.7	1.3	.5	20.8
Tony Bradley^{≠}	3	1	11.3	.455	.500	–	3.0	.7	.0	.0	3.7
Dyson Daniels	76	76	33.2	.517	.188	.615	6.8	5.9	2.0	.4	11.9
N'Faly Dante^{~}	4	0	3.8	.250	–	1.000	1.8	.0	.5	.0	.8
RayJ Dennis^{≠}	3	0	11.3	.364	.286	–	1.0	2.3	.3	.0	3.3
Keshon Gilbert^{≠}	1	0	26.0	.500	.000	1.000	.0	9.0	1.0	.0	11.0
Mouhamed Gueye	77	8	15.3	.452	.308	.645	3.6	.9	.8	.5	4.4
Buddy Hield^{≠}	7	0	7.3	.481	.412	1.000	1.1	.7	.3	.0	5.1
Caleb Houstan^{~}	18	0	4.2	.538	.524	1.000	.6	.2	.1	.1	2.3
Jalen Johnson	72	72	35.2	.489	.352	.788	10.3	7.9	1.2	.4	22.5
Luke Kennard^{‡}	46	0	20.5	.538	.497	.914	2.2	2.1	.7	.1	7.9
Corey Kispert^{≠}	39	8	18.2	.455	.354	.810	2.3	1.5	.2	.2	9.2
Christian Koloko^{≠}	14	2	11.1	.436	.125	.818	2.6	.6	.3	.7	3.1
Vít Krejčí^{‡}	46	8	22.3	.464	.423	.750	2.1	1.5	.8	.5	9.0
Jonathan Kuminga^{≠}	16	1	22.1	.476	.346	.702	5.3	2.1	.9	.3	12.3
Jock Landale^{≠}	23	2	19.4	.516	.391	.541	4.1	1.7	.4	.6	9.1
CJ McCollum^{≠}	41	25	28.8	.456	.357	.748	3.1	4.1	1.0	.6	18.7
Asa Newell	44	2	11.4	.538	.387	.552	2.2	.6	.4	.3	5.2
Onyeka Okongwu	74	63	31.0	.480	.376	.757	7.6	3.1	1.1	1.1	15.2
Kristaps Porziņģis^{‡}	17	12	24.3	.457	.360	.840	5.1	2.7	.5	1.3	17.1
Zaccharie Risacher	67	46	22.4	.455	.368	.644	3.8	1.1	.9	.5	9.6
Jacob Toppin^{~}	5	0	3.4	.667	–	–	.2	.2	.0	.2	1.6
Gabe Vincent^{≠}	24	0	13.3	.360	.300	.833	1.1	1.6	.5	.1	3.9
Keaton Wallace	53	3	10.1	.398	.373	.667	1.1	1.8	.5	.1	3.5
Trae Young^{‡}	10	10	28.0	.415	.305	.863	1.5	8.9	1.0	.1	19.3

^{‡}Traded during the season
^{≠}Acquired during the season
^{~}Waived during the season
^{10}Signed 10-day contract

=== Playoffs ===
Player	GP	GS	MPG	FG%	3P%	FT%	RPG	APG	SPG	BPG	PPG
Nickeil Alexander-Walker	6	6	35.5	.380	.419	.667	2.3	2.7	.5	.8	13.7
Tony Bradley	4	0	10.3	.750	1.000	.667	2.8	.8	.5	.8	2.8
Dyson Daniels	6	6	27.7	.439	.286	.667	6.2	5.0	1.8	.3	7.3
Mouhamed Gueye	6	0	8.3	.286	.100	.500	1.7	.7	.2	.0	1.7
Buddy Hield	2	0	6.5	.800	1.000		1.0	.0	.0	.0	5.0
Jalen Johnson	6	6	35.7	.435	.290	.875	7.7	5.2	.8	.3	19.5
Corey Kispert	5	0	10.8	.182	.083	.667	1.6	1.2	.4	.0	2.2
Jonathan Kuminga	6	0	26.0	.483	.208	.731	3.3	1.0	.5	.5	13.7
CJ McCollum	6	6	32.0	.465	.303	.542	3.0	2.0	1.0	1.2	19.2
Asa Newell	2	0	5.5	.500			.0	.5	.5	.5	1.0
Onyeka Okongwu	6	6	33.2	.583	.455	.750	6.7	2.3	1.2	.8	12.5
Zaccharie Risacher	3	0	7.7	.357	.200		3.0	.0	.0	.0	3.7
Gabe Vincent	6	0	15.5	.364	.333	.800	.5	1.2	.3	.2	4.3
Keaton Wallace	3	0	5.0	.250	.000	1.000	1.0	1.0	.3	.0	2.0

== Transactions ==
=== Trades ===
June 25, 2025
To Atlanta Hawks

Draft rights to Asa Newell (No. 23)
2026 first-round pick
To New Orleans Pelicans

Draft rights to Derik Queen (No. 13)
July 6, 2025
Seven–team trade
To Houston Rockets

Kevin Durant (from Phoenix)
Clint Capela (sign-and-trade deal from Atlanta)

To Atlanta Hawks

David Roddy (from Houston)
Rights to swap 2031 second-round pick with Houston
$85,300 (from Houston)

To Golden State Warriors

Draft rights to Alex Toohey (No. 52) [from Phoenix]
Draft rights to Jahmai Mashack (No. 59) [from Houston]

To Minnesota Timberwolves

Draft rights to Rocco Zikarsky (No. 45) [from L.A. Lakers]
2026 second-round pick (from Denver or Golden State via Phoenix)
Most favorable 2032 second-round pick between Houston and Phoenix
$3,250,000 (from L.A. Lakers)

To Los Angeles Lakers

Draft rights to Adou Thiero (No. 36) [from Brooklyn]

To Brooklyn Nets

2026 second-round pick (from Boston, Indiana, the L.A. Clippers, or Miami via Houston)
2030 second-round pick (from Boston via Houston)

To Phoenix Suns

Jalen Green (from Houston)
Dillon Brooks (from Houston)
Daeqwon Plowden (two-way contract from Atlanta)
Draft rights to Khaman Maluach (No. 10) [from Houston]
Draft rights to Rasheer Fleming (No. 31) [from Minnesota]
Draft rights to Koby Brea (No. 41) [from Golden State]
2026 second-round pick (from Dallas, Oklahoma City, or Philadelphia via Houson)
Least favorable 2032 second-round pick between Houston and Minnesota

July 6, 2025
To Atlanta Hawks

Nickeil Alexander-Walker (sign-and-trade)
To Minnesota Timberwolves

2027 CLE second-round pick
$1,500,000
Three-team trade
July 7, 2025
To Atlanta Hawks

Kristaps Porziņģis (from Boston)
2026 second-round pick (Note: Memphis has the right to swap the more favorable of the picks originally belonging to Indiana and Miami for Boston's own pick; Boston also owns the most favorable of the picks originally belonging to Minnesota, New Orleans, New York, and Portland. Atlanta will receive the less favorable of the two picks Boston holds after Memphis exercises or declines its swap right.) (from Boston)

To Boston Celtics

Georges Niang (from Atlanta)
2031 CLE second-round pick (from Atlanta)
$1,100,000 (from Brooklyn)

To Brooklyn Nets

Terance Mann (from Atlanta)
Draft rights to Drake Powell (No. 22) (from Atlanta)

September 16, 2025
To Atlanta Hawks

Cash Considerations

To Brooklyn Nets

Kobe Bufkin

January 9, 2026
To Atlanta Hawks

CJ McCollum
Corey Kispert

To Washington Wizards

Trae Young

February 1, 2026
To Atlanta Hawks

Duop Reath
2027 ATL second-round pick
2030 NYK second-round pick

To Portland Trail Blazers

Vít Krejčí

February 5, 2026
To Atlanta Hawks

Buddy Hield
Jonathan Kuminga

To Golden State Warriors

Kristaps Porziņģis

February 5, 2026
To Atlanta Hawks

Gabe Vincent
2032 LAL second-round pick

To Los Angeles Lakers

Luke Kennard

February 5, 2026
To Atlanta Hawks

Jock Landale

To Utah Jazz

Cash considerations

I: The 2026 second-round pick that originally would be going to Phoenix before sent to the Minnesota Timberwolves in the seven-team mega-trade would either be the lesser 2026 NBA Draft selection previously held by the Denver Nuggets due to a previous trade the Suns made with Charlotte earlier in the year back in their previous season of play or by the Golden State Warriors through multiple trades on their end.
II: The 2032 second-round pick that would be sent to Minnesota will be the selection that's considered the higher selection between Houston and Phoenix, while the Suns would keep the lesser of the second-round picks between the Rockets and Timberwolves. As such, if the Suns have a worse record by 2032 than Houston, the trade would effectively be the Suns getting the worst selection between the Timberwolves and Rockets, while Houston sends out the Suns' second-round pick that year out to Minnesota alongside the Timberwolves keeping the remaining second-round pick of the three teams instead. However, if the Rockets hold a better record than the Suns by 2032, then Houston would send Phoenix's second-round pick either right back to the Suns or out to the Timberwolves (depending on which team between them had the better overall record by that year), while Minnesota would have both of the remaining second-round picks between the three teams instead.
III: Due to another trade the Brooklyn Nets made with the Memphis Grizzlies (thus making the transaction more complex to cover efficiently due to the amount of previous trades involved before this one (including a previous deal involving the Suns, funnily enough)), the Nets will receive either the Los Angeles Clippers' own 2026 second-round pick without any stipulations involved with it or one of the second-round picks that was originally held by either the Boston Celtics, Indiana Pacers, or Miami Heat, depending on which option is the least favorable amongst the four teams for this season of play.
IV: Due to multiple trades that involved the Houston Rockets before the massive deal that the Suns made, the Rockets will give Phoenix the middle-valued draft pick in the 2026 NBA draft (with the defending champion Oklahoma City Thunder getting the most valuable of the upcoming selections and the San Antonio Spurs getting the least valuable of the upcoming selections by a different trade involving them) between the Dallas Mavericks, the defending-champion Oklahoma City Thunder, and the Philadelphia 76ers.

=== Free agency ===
==== Re-signed ====
Date	Player	Signed	Ref.
July 10, 2025	Jacob Toppin	Two-way contract	
July 18, 2025	Keaton Wallace	Two-way contract	

==== Additions ====
Date	Player	Signed	Former Team	Ref.
July 3, 2025	Eli Ndiaye	Two-way contract	(Spain) Real Madrid	
July 8, 2025	Luke Kennard	1 Year, $11 Million	Memphis Grizzlies	
August 18, 2025	N'Faly Dante	2 Year, $4.4 Million	Houston Rockets	
August 19, 2025	Caleb Houstan	1 Year, $2.4 Million	Orlando Magic	
December 24, 2025	Malik Williams	Two-way contract	College Park Skyhawks	
January 1, 2026	RayJ Dennis	Two-way contract	Los Angeles Clippers	
January 16, 2026	Christian Koloko	Two-way contract	Memphis Grizzlies	
March 4, 2026	Keshon Gilbert	Two-way contract	Washington Wizards	
April 6, 2026	Tony Bradley	1 Year, $125,000	Indiana Pacers	

==== Subtractions ====
Date	Player	Reason	New Team	Ref.
July 1, 2025	Garrison Matthews	Free Agent	Indiana Pacers	
July 6, 2025	Larry Nance Jr.	Free Agent	Cleveland Cavaliers	
July 8, 2025	Caris LeVert	Free Agent	Detroit Pistons	
July 9, 2025	Dominick Barlow	Free Agent	Philadelphia 76ers	
December 15, 2025	Jacob Toppin	Waived	Free Agent	
December 31, 2025	Eli Ndiaye	Waived	Free Agent	
January 7, 2026	Malik Williams	Waived	College Park Skyhawks	
February 5, 2026	Duop Reath	Waived	Free Agent	
February 5, 2026	N'Faly Dante	Waived	Free Agent	
February 18, 2026	Nikola Đurišić	Waived	(Serbia) Crvena zvezda	
April 4, 2026	Caleb Houstan	Waived	Free Agent	
