= Jacob Toppin =

American basketball player (born 2000)

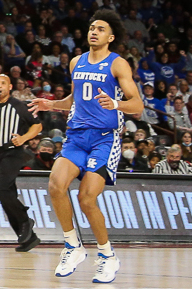
- Toppin with Kentucky in 2022

No. 0 – Hapoel Tel Aviv
- Position: Power forward
- League: Israeli Basketball Premier League; EuroLeague

Personal information
- Born: May 8, 2000 (age 26) Brooklyn, New York, U.S.
- Listed height: 6 ft 9 in (2.06 m)
- Listed weight: 200 lb (91 kg)

Career information
- High school: Ossining (Ossining, New York); Woodstock Academy (Woodstock, Connecticut)
- College: Rhode Island (2019–2020); Kentucky (2020–2023)
- NBA draft: 2023: undrafted
- Playing career: 2023–present

Career history
- 2023–2025: New York Knicks
- 2023–2025: →Westchester Knicks
- 2025: Atlanta Hawks
- 2025: →College Park Skyhawks
- 2026–present: Hapoel Tel Aviv
- Stats at NBA.com
- Stats at Basketball Reference

Jacob Toppin (/ˈtɒpɪn/ TOP-in; born May 8, 2000) is an American professional basketball player for Hapoel Tel Aviv of the Israeli Basketball Premier League and the EuroLeague. He played college basketball for the Rhode Island Rams and Kentucky Wildcats. He has played in the NBA with the New York Knicks and the Atlanta Hawks.

== Early life ==
Toppin's parents are Roni and Obadiah Toppin, and he grew up in Bushwick in Brooklyn, New York. Through his mother, Roni, who is of Italian and Jewish descent, Toppin is Jewish; he also celebrated Jewish traditions growing up. His parents split in 2012, his mother brought the children back to New York, and he lived primarily with his mother, who raised the brothers as a single parent. Following his move to the Israeli Basketball Premier League in 2026, Hapoel Tel Aviv initiated the process to secure Israeli citizenship for Toppin based on his heritage, allowing him to bypass domestic league restrictions on foreign players.

His father, Obadiah Toppin, was a well-known streetball player in New York City who played professionally in the ABA for the Harlem Strong Dogs.

Toppin's older brother, Obi Toppin, is also an NBA player.

== High school career ==
Toppin and his family moved to Melbourne, Florida, and he first attended Heritage High School in Florida, and then to Ossining, New York, where he attended Ossining High School and played basketball, football, and volleyball. As a senior for Woodstock Academy, he averaged 15.6 points and 8.8 rebounds per game, earning All-Selection honors, and was an honor roll student. Toppin was not highly recruited but committed to play college basketball at Rhode Island.

== College career ==
Toppin in 30 games averaged 18.4 minutes, 5.1 points, and 3.9 rebounds in a bench role as a freshman at Rhode Island.

He transferred to Kentucky after the season, and majored in Communications. As a sophomore, in 24 games he averaged 17.1 minutes, 5.2 points, and 3.5 rebounds per game, and was named to the SEC Conference Academic Honor Roll. Toppin played 29 games and averaged 17.7 minutes, 6.2 points, 3.2 rebounds, and 1.1 assists per game as a junior, shooting 55.6% from the field, and 40.0% from three-point range, and was named to the SEC Winter Academic Honor Roll.

As a senior, he played in 33 games, averaged 31.4 minutes, 12.4 points, 6.8 rebounds (8th in the SEC), and 2.2 assists per game, while shooting 46.3% from the floor. Toppin declared for the 2023 NBA draft following the season, forgoing an additional year of eligibility.

== Professional career ==
=== New York Knicks/ Westchester Knicks (2023–2025) ===
After going undrafted in the 2023 NBA draft, Toppin signed an Exhibit 10 contract with the New York Knicks on July 6, 2023 and on October 22, the Knicks converted his deal into two-way contract.

On December 5, 2023, Toppin made his NBA debut for the Knicks in a 146–122 loss to the Milwaukee Bucks. On February 22, 2024, he signed a 10-day contract with New York and on March 4, he signed another two-way contract with the Knicks. In 2023-24 with Westchester, he played in 42 games, and averaged 35.1 minutes, 17.8 points, 7.8 rebounds, 2.6 assists, 1.1 steals, and 0.9 blocks per game, while shooting 45.7% from the field.

In 2023-24 with the New York Knicks, he played in 9 games, and averaged 4.2 minutes, 0.4 points, and 0.9 rebounds per game, while shooting 5-for-9 from the field. He competed in the 2024 NBA Slam Dunk Contest, and finished in third place. On August 14, 2024, Toppin signed another two-way deal with the Knicks. On March 2, 2025, the Knicks waived Toppin. In 2024-25 with Westchester, he played in 15 games, and averaged 37.1 minutes, 24.1 points, 8.5 rebounds, and 3.2 assists per game, while shooting 50.2% from the field and 83.3% from the free throw line. In 2024-25 with the New York Knicks, he played in 16 games, and averaged 3.0 minutes, 1.4 points, and 0.8 rebounds per game.

=== Atlanta Hawks/College Park Skyhawks (2025) ===
On March 4, 2025, Toppin signed a two-way contract with the Atlanta Hawks. In 8 games with the College Park Skyhawks, he averaged 35.8 minutes, 19.4 points, 8.0 rebounds, and 3.0 assists per game, while shooting 50.0% from the field . His only appearance for Atlanta came in the team's season finale against the Orlando Magic, in which he recorded 17 points, four rebounds, and two assists.

On July 10, 2025, Toppin re-signed with the Hawks on a new two-way contract. He made five appearances for Atlanta, averaging 1.6 points, 0.2 rebounds, and 0.2 assists. On December 8, it was announced that Toppin would miss the remainder of the season after undergoing surgery to repair a torn labrum in his right shoulder. He was waived by the Hawks on December 15. In 5 games with the College Park Skyhawks, he averaged 31.0 minutes, 18.0 points, 10.4 rebounds, 3.2 assists, and 1.0 steals per game, while shooting 48.6% from the field . In five games with Atlanta he averaged 3.4 minutes and 1.6 points per game, shooting 4-for-6 from the field.

=== Hapoel Tel Aviv (2026–present) ===
On July 29, 2026, Toppin signed a three-year contract with Hapoel Tel Aviv of the Israeli Basketball Premier League.

== Career statistics ==
Legend
GP	Games played	GS	Games started	MPG	Minutes per game
FG%	Field goal percentage	3P%	3-point field goal percentage	FT%	Free throw percentage
RPG	Rebounds per game	APG	Assists per game	SPG	Steals per game
BPG	Blocks per game	PPG	Points per game	**Bold**	Career high

=== NBA ===
Year	Team	GP	GS	MPG	FG%	3P%	FT%	RPG	APG	SPG	BPG	PPG
2023–24	New York	9	0	4.2	.556	.250	**1.000**	.8	.3	.0	.1	1.4
2024–25	New York	**16**	0	3.1	.300	.000	—	.7	.3	.1	.0	.4
2024–25	Atlanta	1	0	**27.0**	.500	**.625**	—	**4.0**	**2.0**	.0	.0	**17.0**
2025–26	Atlanta	5	0	3.4	**.667**	—	—	.2	.2	.0	**.2**	1.6
Career		31	0	4.2	.486	.429	1.000	.7	.3	.1	.1	1.4

=== College ===
Year	Team	GP	GS	MPG	FG%	3P%	FT%	RPG	APG	SPG	BPG	PPG
2019–20	Rhode Island	30	3	18.5	.426	.245	.644	3.9	.5	.4	.4	5.1
2020–21	Kentucky	24	2	17.1	.444	.308	**.780**	3.5	.7	**.5**	.3	5.2
2021–22	Kentucky	29	4	17.7	**.556**	**.400**	.745	3.2	1.1	.3	**.6**	6.2
2022–23	Kentucky	**33**	**31**	**31.4**	.463	.305	.664	**6.8**	**2.2**	**.5**	.5	**12.4**
Career		116	40	21.7	.471	.289	.695	4.5	1.2	.4	.4	7.4
