= Mouhamed Gueye =

Senegalese basketball player (born 2002)

No. 18 – Atlanta Hawks
- Position: Power forward
- League: NBA

Personal information
- Born: 9 November 2002 (age 24) Dakar, Senegal
- Listed height: 6 ft 11 in (2.11 m)
- Listed weight: 210 lb (95 kg)

Career information
- High school: Prolific Prep (Napa, California)
- College: Washington State (2021–2023)
- NBA draft: 2023: 2nd round, 39th overall pick
- Drafted by: Charlotte Hornets
- Playing career: 2023–present

Career history
- 2023–present: Atlanta Hawks
- 2024–2025: →College Park Skyhawks

Career highlights
- First-team All-Pac-12 (2023); Pac-12 All-Freshman team (2022)
- Stats at NBA.com
- Stats at Basketball Reference

Mouhamed Gueye (/ɡeɪ/ GAY; born 9 November 2002) is a Senegalese professional basketball player for the Atlanta Hawks of the National Basketball Association (NBA). He moved to the United States as a teenager to play high school basketball at Prolific Prep. Gueye played college basketball for the Washington State Cougars and was named to the All-Pac-12 first-team as a sophomore in 2023. He was selected as the 39th overall pick in the 2023 NBA draft by the Charlotte Hornets, but was traded to the Atlanta Hawks on draft night.

== Early life ==
Gueye was raised in Dakar, Senegal, as the youngest of four siblings in a sporting family. He has cousins who have played for the national basketball team and who played professionally in Europe. Gueye grew up playing soccer but was encouraged by his mother to play basketball because of his height. He credits watching his older brother play basketball as an early influence.

== High school career ==
Gueye's personal coach, Mamadou Cisse, connected him with Philippe Doherty, the head coach of Prolific Prep in Napa, California. At age 16, he moved from Dakar to the United States to enroll at Prolific Prep. Gueye had never played organized basketball before playing at Prolific Prep.

Gueye emerged as a four-star recruit and a top-50 recruit in the country. He completed his academic requirements early and reclassified to the 2021 class before he committed to play for the Washington State Cougars over several other high-major offers.

== College career ==
Gueye averaged 7.4 points, 5.2 rebounds and .5 assists per game during his freshman season with the Cougars in 2021–22. He was selected to the Pac-12 all-freshman team. Gueye declared for the 2022 NBA draft, but withdrew after receiving feedback from NBA teams. He also tested the transfer portal but elected to return to the Cougars for his sophomore season.

Gueye's role with the Cougars increased during the 2022–23 season following the departure of key pieces of their front-court. He also played primarily as a center instead of his natural power forward position. Gueye was the centrepiece of the Cougars' offense with head coach Kyle Smith reinforcing throughout the season that the team "plays through Gueye". On 2 February 2023, he scored a career-high 31 points against the USC Trojans. Gueye averaged 14.3 points, 8.4 rebounds and 1.9 assists per game during the 2022–23 season and was named to the All-Pac-12 first-team.

On 4 April 2023, Gueye declared for the 2023 NBA draft. He was invited to participate in the NBA draft combine.

== Professional career ==
=== Atlanta Hawks (2023–present) ===
Gueye was selected by the Charlotte Hornets in the second round as the 39th overall pick of the 2023 NBA draft. His rights were traded to the Boston Celtics and then to the Atlanta Hawks on draft night. On 3 July 2023, Gueye signed his rookie contract with the Hawks. However, on 12 November, he was ruled out for a month after suffering a right lower-back stress fracture, subsequently missing most of his rookie season. Gueye returned from his injury with several stints for the Hawks' NBA G League affiliate, the College Park Skyhawks, both as a rookie and a sophomore. He made six total appearances for Atlanta during his rookie campaign, posting averages of 4.0 points, 3.7 rebounds, and 0.7 assists.

On 11 April 2025, Gueye recorded a career-high 18 rebounds and scored 10 points during a 124–110 win over the Philadelphia 76ers. He made 33 total appearances (including 28 starts) for the Hawks during the 2024–25 NBA season, averaging 6.0 points, 4.2 rebounds, and 0.8 assists.

On 8 November 2025, Gueye recorded a career-high 21 points with seven rebounds and seven assists in a 122–102 victory over the Los Angeles Lakers. On 9 February 2026, Gueye was ejected from a game against the Minnesota Timberwolves after being involved in an altercation with Naz Reid early in the fourth quarter. He and Reid were both subsequently fined $35,000 for the incident.

On 15 July 2026, it was announced that Gueye would be sidelined for three–to–four months after undergoing surgery to repair a fractured left foot.

== Career statistics ==
Legend
GP	Games played	GS	Games started	MPG	Minutes per game
FG%	Field goal percentage	3P%	3-point field goal percentage	FT%	Free throw percentage
RPG	Rebounds per game	APG	Assists per game	SPG	Steals per game
BPG	Blocks per game	PPG	Points per game	**Bold**	Career high

=== NBA ===
==== Regular season ====
Year	Team	GP	GS	MPG	FG%	3P%	FT%	RPG	APG	SPG	BPG	PPG
2023–24	Atlanta	6	0	12.1	.348	**.333**	**.833**	3.7	.7	**.8**	.7	4.0
2024–25	Atlanta	33	**28**	**16.2**	.421	.259	.762	**4.2**	.8	**.8**	**1.0**	**6.0**
2025–26	Atlanta	**77**	8	15.3	**.452**	.308	.645	3.6	**.9**	**.8**	.5	4.4
**Career**		116	36	15.4	.436	.291	.700	3.8	.9	.8	.7	4.9

==== Playoffs ====
Year	Team	GP	GS	MPG	FG%	3P%	FT%	RPG	APG	SPG	BPG	PPG
2026	Atlanta	6	0	8.3	.286	.100	.500	1.7	.7	.2	.0	1.7
Career		6	0	8.3	.286	.100	.500	1.7	.7	.2	.0	1.7

=== College ===
Year	Team	GP	GS	MPG	FG%	3P%	FT%	RPG	APG	SPG	BPG	PPG
2021–22	Washington State	**35**	**33**	21.9	**.491**	**.280**	.493	5.2	.5	**.8**	**.9**	7.4
2022–23	Washington State	33	**33**	**32.1**	.488	.275	**.674**	**8.4**	**1.9**	**.8**	.8	**14.3**
Career		68	66	26.9	.489	.277	.613	6.7	1.2	.8	.9	10.7
