= Jalen Johnson =

American basketball player (born 2001)

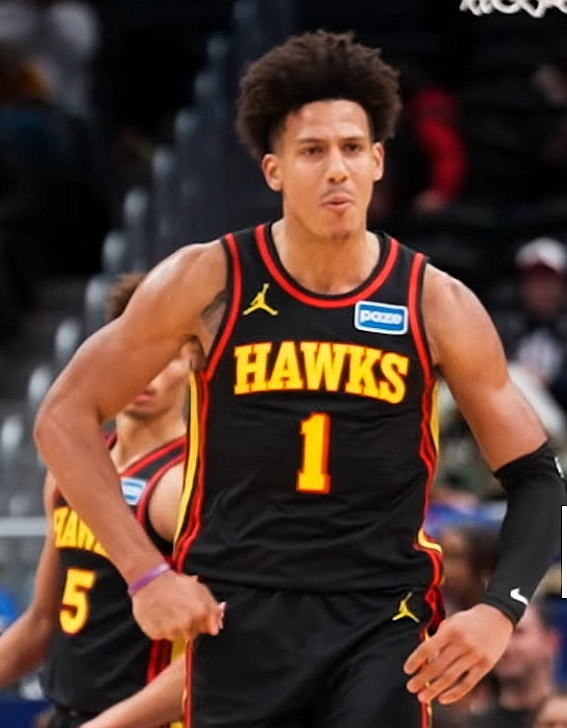
- Johnson playing for the Atlanta Hawks in 2026

No. 1 – Atlanta Hawks
- Position: Power forward
- League: NBA

Personal information
- Born: December 18, 2001 (age 24) Wausau, Wisconsin, U.S.
- Listed height: 6 ft 8 in (2.03 m)
- Listed weight: 219 lb (99 kg)

Career information
- High school: Sun Prairie (Sun Prairie, Wisconsin); Nicolet (Glendale, Wisconsin)
- College: Duke (2020–2021)
- NBA draft: 2021: 1st round, 20th overall pick
- Drafted by: Atlanta Hawks
- Playing career: 2021–present

Career history
- 2021–present: Atlanta Hawks

Career highlights
- NBA All-Star (2026); All-NBA Third Team (2026)
- Stats at NBA.com
- Stats at Basketball Reference

Jalen Tyrese Johnson (born December 18, 2001) is an American professional basketball player for the Atlanta Hawks of the National Basketball Association (NBA), with whom he has been selected to one All-Star game to date. He played college basketball for the Duke Blue Devils. Johnson was a consensus five-star recruit and one of the best forwards in the 2020 class. He finished his high school career at Nicolet High School in Glendale, Wisconsin.

== High school career ==
Johnson played his first two years of high school basketball for Sun Prairie High School in Sun Prairie, Wisconsin. He played under former head coach Jeff Boos, who was inducted into the Wisconsin Basketball Coaches Association (WBCA) Hall of Fame in 2020. As a freshman in 2016–17, Johnson averaged 15.2 points, 6.2 rebounds, 2.1 assists, 1.2 steals, and 1.1 blocks to help his team to a 20–4 record. They were upset in the Regional Finals by Madison East High School. As a sophomore in 2017–18, Johnson averaged 18.4 points, 9.6 rebounds, 4.0 assists, 1.9 steals, and 1.5 blocks to help his team to a 25–2 record. He led the Cardinals to their first state tournament Division 1 semifinals appearance.

After his sophomore year he transferred to Nicolet High School in Glendale, Wisconsin. Johnson helped lead Nicolet to the Division 2 State Championship. He was named the Associated Press Player of the Year for Wisconsin. In 2019, Johnson transferred to IMG Academy in Bradenton, Florida for his senior year. On January 5, 2020, he left IMG Academy, before returning to Nicolet, though not necessarily to play basketball. He was ruled eligible on February 8 to play the remainder of the season for Nicolet after never playing in a game for IMG. As a senior, Johnson averaged 24.6 points, 10.9 rebounds and 4.8 assists in 9 games. He was selected to play in the Jordan Brand Classic, which was canceled due to the COVID-19 pandemic.

=== Recruiting ===
Johnson was rated as a five-star recruit and the No.13 overall recruit in the 2020 high school class.

On July 4, 2019, Johnson committed to play college basketball at Duke University over offers from Arizona, Kentucky, and Wisconsin.

College recruiting
Name	Hometown	School	Height	Weight	Commit date
Jalen Johnson; SF	Sun Prairie, WI	Nicolet (WI)	6 ft 8 in (2.03 m)	210 lb (95 kg)	Jul 4, 2019
Jalen Johnson; SF	Recruit ratings: Rivals: 247Sports: ESPN: (94)				
Overall recruit ranking: Rivals: 9 247Sports: 14 ESPN: 13
Note: In many cases, Scout, Rivals, 247Sports, On3, and ESPN may conflict in their listings of height and weight.; In these cases, the average was taken. ESPN grades are on a 100-point scale.; Sources: "Duke 2020 Basketball Commitments". Rivals.; "2020 Duke Blue Devils Recruiting Class". ESPN.; "2020 Team Ranking". Rivals.

== College career ==
The 2020–21 Duke Blue Devils team entered the season in the top 10, and Johnson was its most highly rated player. In his first game, Johnson had 19 points and 19 rebounds against Coppin State. On November 30, 2020, Johnson earned ACC Freshman of the Week honors. On January 26, 2021, he scored 18 points and 6 rebounds in a 75–68 win over Georgia Tech.

On February 15, 2021, Johnson announced that he would forgo the remainder of Duke's season to prepare for the 2021 NBA draft. Leaving in the midst of a college season raised many questions, with Johnson claiming that the decision was in the best interest of his family and himself.

During his 13 games as a Blue Devil, Johnson averaged 11.2 points, 6.2 rebounds, and 2.0 assists per game.

Duke ended its season with 13 wins and 11 losses. They finished 10th in the ACC with a 9–9 record.

== Professional career ==
=== Atlanta Hawks (2021–present) ===
==== Early years (2021–2024) ====
On July 29, 2021, Johnson was selected by the Atlanta Hawks with the 20th pick in the 2021 NBA draft. On August 4, he signed with the Hawks. Johnson appeared in 22 games during his rookie season with the Hawks in 2021–22, seeing limited minutes while splitting time between the NBA roster and the team’s NBA G League affiliate, the College Park Skyhawks. After the season ended, he underwent a non-surgical left knee procedure.

In the 2022–23 season, Johnson earned a more regular role off the bench for Atlanta, averaging 5.6 points and 4.0 rebounds in 70 games as he gradually expanded his playing time and contributions.

Johnson’s 2023–24 season marked his first year as a primary starter, where he posted significant improvements across the board, setting then-career highs with averages of 16.0 points, 8.7 rebounds and 3.6 assists per game while starting 52 of 56 games. On April 4, 2024, He recorded his first career triple‑double, finishing with 28 points, 14 rebounds, and 11 assists in the Hawks’ 121–113 win over the Detroit Pistons.

==== Breakthrough and injury (2024–2025) ====
On October 21, 2024, Johnson and the Hawks agreed to a five–year, $150 million contract extension. In his fourth season, Johnson emerged as a breakout player for the Hawks, earning a starting role and averaging career highs of 18.9 points, 10.0 rebounds, and 5.0 assists per game, along with 1.6 steals and 1.0 blocks in 36 games, before his season was cut short on January 29, 2025, due to shoulder surgery. At that point of the season, Johnson was one of the leading candidates for the Most Improved Player award.

==== First All-Star and All-NBA appearances (2025–present) ====
On November 13, 2025, Johnson recorded 31 points, 18 rebounds, 14 assists, seven steals and four three-pointers in a 132–122 win over the Utah Jazz. The performance marked the third triple-double of his career and his first of the season, and he set a then career high in points, alongside new career highs in rebounds, assists, and steals while matching his career high in made three-pointers. With the performance, Johnson also became the first player in NBA history to record 31 points, 18 rebounds, 14 assists, and seven steals in a single game. On November 28, Johnson put up his fourth career triple-double with 29 points, 12 rebounds, and 12 assists in a 130–123 win over the Cleveland Cavaliers. On November 30, Johnson notched a then career-high 41 points, along with 14 rebounds and seven assists in a 142–134 double overtime victory against the Philadelphia 76ers. On December 5, Johnson recorded the fastest triple-double in Hawks franchise history and the second-fastest in NBA history against the Denver Nuggets by achieving 11 points, 12 assists, and 10 rebounds in the first half and ending with 21 points, 18 rebounds, and 16 assists in a 134–133 loss. On December 18, Johnson scored a career-high 43 points, nearly posting a triple-double with 11 rebounds and 9 assists in a 133–126 loss to the Charlotte Hornets.

On January 31, 2026, Johnson put up a triple-double with 33 points, 12 rebounds, and 10 assists in a 129–124 loss to the Indiana Pacers. It was his eighth triple-double of the season, setting the record for the most triple-doubles in a single season in Hawks franchise history. On February 1, Johnson was named to his first All-Star Game as a Eastern Conference reserve. Johnson finished the regular season with 13 triple-doubles, joining Bob Pettit in Hawks franchise history with multiple 30-point, 15-rebound, and 8-assist games. The Hawks finished with a 46–36 record and the sixth seed, and Johnson was named to the All-NBA Third Team, earning the first All-NBA selection of his career.

The Hawks faced the New York Knicks during their first-round playoff series. On April 18, Johnson put up 23 points, seven rebounds, and three assists in a 113–102 Game 1 loss. On April 23, he recorded 24 points, ten rebounds, eight assists, and two steals in a 109–108 Game 3 win, which gave the Hawks a 2–1 series lead. They eventually lost to the Knicks in six games.

== Personal life ==
Johnson is the son of Stacy and Roderick Johnson. He has three brothers. His father played college basketball at University of Wisconsin–Milwaukee and Southeast Missouri State University before playing professionally for two years in Poland. His mother also played college basketball at University of Wisconsin–Milwaukee. His brother Rod, played basketball at University of Tennessee at Chattanooga and his younger brother Kobe played basketball at University of Southern California and UCLA.

== Career statistics ==
Legend
GP	Games played	GS	Games started	MPG	Minutes per game
FG%	Field goal percentage	3P%	3-point field goal percentage	FT%	Free throw percentage
RPG	Rebounds per game	APG	Assists per game	SPG	Steals per game
BPG	Blocks per game	PPG	Points per game	**Bold**	Career high

=== NBA ===
==== Regular season ====
Year	Team	GP	GS	MPG	FG%	3P%	FT%	RPG	APG	SPG	BPG	PPG
2021–22	Atlanta	22	0	5.5	**.537**	.231	.714	1.2	.1	.1	.1	2.4
2022–23	Atlanta	70	6	14.9	.491	.288	.628	4.0	1.2	.5	.5	5.6
2023–24	Atlanta	56	52	33.7	.511	**.355**	.728	8.7	3.6	1.2	.8	16.0
2024–25	Atlanta	36	36	**35.7**	.500	.312	.746	10.0	5.0	**1.6**	**1.0**	18.9
2025–26	Atlanta	**72**	**72**	35.2	.489	.352	**.788**	**10.3**	**7.9**	1.2	.4	**22.5**
Career		256	166	26.8	.497	.335	.751	7.4	4.0	1.0	.6	14.2
All-Star		1	0	18.4	.667	.500	–	4.0	2.0	2.0	1.0	14.0

==== Playoffs ====
Year	Team	GP	GS	MPG	FG%	3P%	FT%	RPG	APG	SPG	BPG	PPG
2022	Atlanta	2	0	4.6	.000	.000	—	.0	.0	.0	.0	.0
2023	Atlanta	**6**	0	9.3	.417	**.364**	**1.000**	2.5	1.3	.5	.0	4.3
2026	Atlanta	**6**	**6**	**35.7**	**.435**	.290	.875	**7.7**	**5.2**	**.8**	**.3**	**19.5**
Career		14	6	19.9	.420	.302	.882	4.4	2.8	.6	.1	10.2

=== College ===
Year	Team	GP	GS	MPG	FG%	3P%	FT%	RPG	APG	SPG	BPG	PPG
2020–21	Duke	13	8	21.4	.523	.444	.632	6.1	2.2	1.2	1.2	11.2
