= Asa Newell =

American basketball player (born 2005)

- Newell with Atlanta Hawks in 2025

No. 14 – Atlanta Hawks
- Position: Power forward
- League: NBA

Personal information
- Born: October 5, 2005 (age 21) Atlanta, Georgia, U.S.
- Listed height: 6 ft 9 in (2.06 m)
- Listed weight: 220 lb (100 kg)

Career information
- High school: Choctawhatchee (Fort Walton Beach, Florida); Montverde Academy (Montverde, Florida)
- College: Georgia (2024–2025)
- NBA draft: 2025: 1st round, 23rd overall pick
- Drafted by: New Orleans Pelicans
- Playing career: 2025–present

Career history
- 2025–present: Atlanta Hawks
- 2025–2026: →College Park Skyhawks

Career highlights
- SEC All-Freshman Team (2025); Jordan Brand Classic (2024); Nike Hoop Summit (2024)
- Stats at NBA.com
- Stats at Basketball Reference
Medals
Men's basketball
Representing United States
FIBA Under-17 Basketball World Cup
Gold medal – first place	2022 Spain	Team

Asa Christian Newell (born October 5, 2005) is an American professional basketball player for the Atlanta Hawks of the National Basketball Association (NBA). He played college basketball for the Georgia Bulldogs. Newell was a consensus five-star recruit in the class of 2024, earning the 2023 FIBA Under-19 World Cup Defensive MVP.

== Early life and high school career ==
Newell was born in Atlanta, Georgia, and grew up in Athens, Georgia before his family moved to Destin, Florida when he was ten years old. He initially attended Choctawhatchee High School in Fort Walton Beach, Florida. Newell averaged 14.7 points and 8.7 rebounds per game and was named the area Player of the Year by the Northwest Florida Daily News as a sophomore. Newell transferred to Montverde Academy in Montverde, Florida prior to the start of his junior year.

=== Recruiting ===
Newell was a consensus five-star recruit and one of the top players in the 2024 class, according to major recruiting services. On October 25, 2023, he committed to playing college basketball for Georgia after considering offers from Texas, Alabama, and Gonzaga. He signed a National Letter of Intent to play for the Bulldogs on November 8, 2023, during the early signing period.

College recruiting
Name	Hometown	School	Height	Weight	Commit date
Asa Newell; PF	Destin, FL	Montverde Academy (FL)	6 ft 10 in (2.08 m)	205 lb (93 kg)	Oct 25, 2023
Asa Newell; PF	Recruit ratings: Rivals: 247Sports: On3: ESPN: (92)				
Overall recruit ranking: Rivals: 13 247Sports: 19 On3: 11 ESPN: 13
Note: In many cases, Scout, Rivals, 247Sports, On3, and ESPN may conflict in their listings of height and weight.; In these cases, the average was taken. ESPN grades are on a 100-point scale.; Sources: "Georgia 2024 Basketball Commitments". Rivals.; "2024 Georgia Bulldogs Recruiting Class". ESPN.; "2024 Team Ranking". Rivals.

== College career ==
On November 4, 2024, Newell made his debut for the Georgia Bulldogs, recording 26 points, 11 rebounds, and three blocks in an 83–78 win over Tennessee Tech. He averaged 15.4 points, 6.8 rebounds and 1.0 block in 29.0 minutes per game. Newell was named to the SEC All-Freshman Team. Following the season, he declared for the 2025 NBA draft.

== Professional career ==
On June 25, 2025, Newell was selected with the 23rd pick by the New Orleans Pelicans in the 2025 NBA draft, but was subsequently traded along with a future unprotected first-round pick to his hometown team, the Atlanta Hawks, in exchange for the draft rights of his former high school teammate Derik Queen.

== National team career ==
Newell played for the United States under-17 basketball team at the 2022 FIBA Under-17 Basketball World Cup. Newell was also named to the United States under-19 basketball team to play in the 2023 FIBA Under-19 Basketball World Cup.

== Career statistics ==
Legend
GP	Games played	GS	Games started	MPG	Minutes per game
FG%	Field goal percentage	3P%	3-point field goal percentage	FT%	Free throw percentage
RPG	Rebounds per game	APG	Assists per game	SPG	Steals per game
BPG	Blocks per game	PPG	Points per game	**Bold**	Career high

=== NBA ===
==== Regular season ====
Year	Team	GP	GS	MPG	FG%	3P%	FT%	RPG	APG	SPG	BPG	PPG
2025–26	Atlanta	44	2	11.4	.538	.387	.552	2.2	.6	.4	.3	5.2
Career		44	2	11.4	.538	.387	.552	2.2	.6	.4	.3	5.2

==== Playoffs ====
Year	Team	GP	GS	MPG	FG%	3P%	FT%	RPG	APG	SPG	BPG	PPG
2026	Atlanta	2	0	5.5	.500	–	–	.0	.5	.5	.5	1.0
Career		2	0	5.5	.500	–	–	.0	.5	.5	.5	1.0

=== College ===
Year	Team	GP	GS	MPG	FG%	3P%	FT%	RPG	APG	SPG	BPG	PPG
2024–25	Georgia	33	33	29.0	.543	.292	.748	6.9	.9	1.0	1.0	15.4

== Personal life ==
Newell's older brother, Jaden, is a walk-on basketball player at Georgia.

Newell is the son of Justin Newell and Carmen Mitchell-Newell. He lived in Athens, Georgia for six years during his childhood, from when he was 4-10, while his grandmother, Jacqueline Mitchell, served as an administrative assistant in Human Resources at UGA.
