= Keaton Wallace =

American basketball player (born 1999)

- Wallace with Maccabi Tel Aviv in 2026

No. 17 – Maccabi Tel Aviv
- Position: Point guard / shooting guard
- League: Israeli Premier League; EuroLeague

Personal information
- Born: February 26, 1999 (age 27) Richardson, Texas, U.S.
- Listed height: 6 ft 3 in (1.91 m)
- Listed weight: 185 lb (84 kg)

Career information
- High school: Richardson (Richardson, Texas)
- College: UTSA (2017–2021)
- NBA draft: 2021: undrafted
- Playing career: 2021–present

Career history
- 2021–2023: Agua Caliente / Ontario Clippers
- 2023–2024: College Park Skyhawks
- 2024–2026: Atlanta Hawks
- 2024–2025: →College Park Skyhawks
- 2026–present: Maccabi Tel Aviv

Career highlights
- 3× Second-team All-Conference USA (2019–2021); Conference USA All-Freshman Team (2018)
- Stats at NBA.com
- Stats at Basketball Reference

Keaton Wallace (born February 26, 1999) is an American professional basketball player for Maccabi Tel Aviv of the Israeli Premier League and the EuroLeague. He played college basketball for the UTSA Roadrunners.

== High school career ==
Wallace played basketball for Richardson High School in Richardson, Texas. As a senior, he averaged 22.2 points, 4.6 assists and 3.9 rebounds per game, earning District 9-6A Offensive Player of the Year honors.

== College career ==
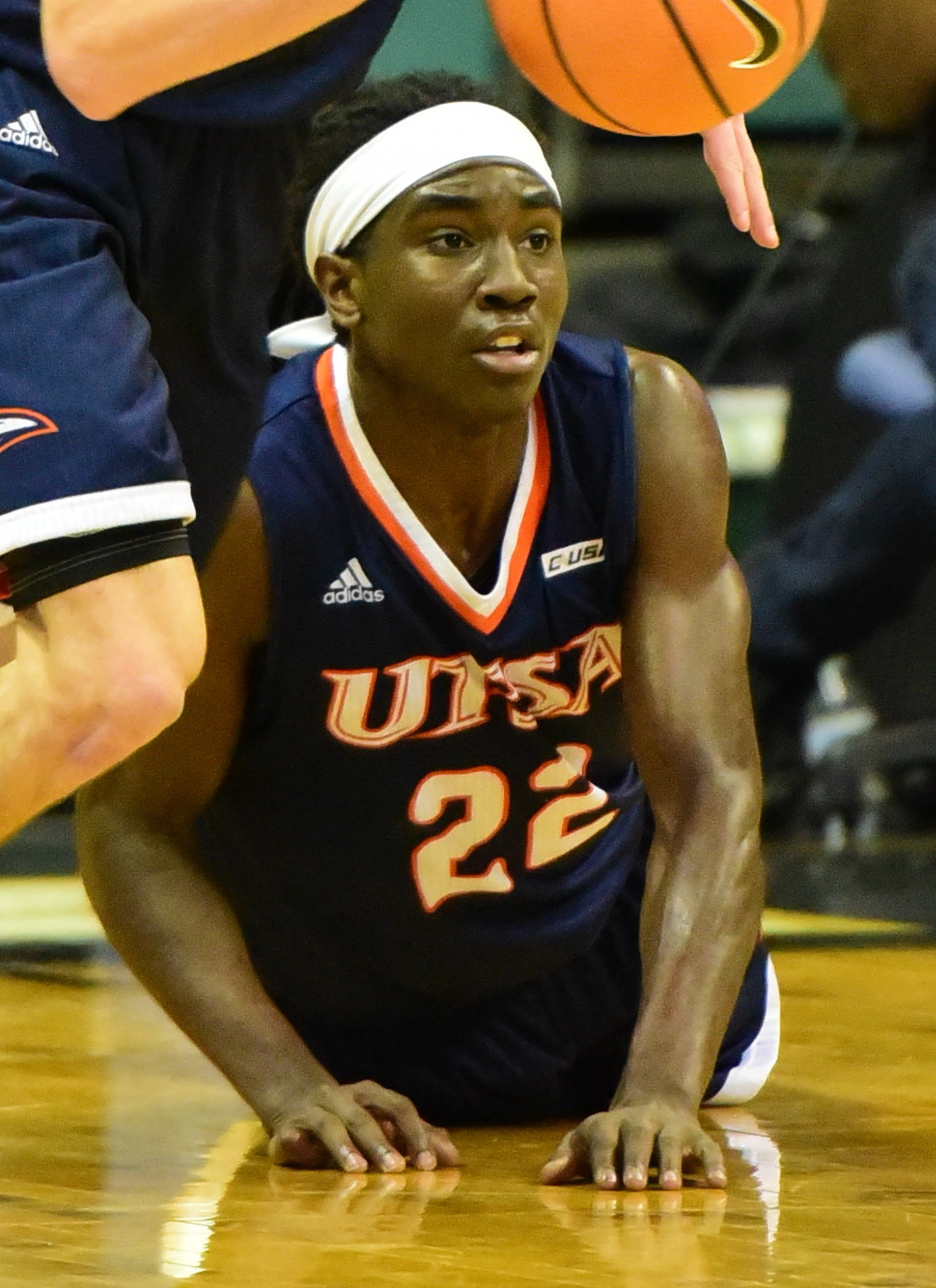
Wallace with UTSA in 2018

As a freshman at UTSA, Wallace averaged 11.4 points, 3.1 rebounds and 2.7 assists per game, and was named to the Conference USA All-Freshman Team. Entering his sophomore season, he gained about 20 lb (9.1 kg) of muscle from the start of his college career and became an improved scorer. Wallace formed the highest-scoring backcourt in nation with Jhivvan Jackson. On February 2, 2019, he recorded a career-high 45 points, the fourth most in a game in program history, and seven rebounds in a 116–106 win against Marshall. As a sophomore, Wallace averaged 20.2 points, five rebounds and 2.4 assists per game, receiving Second Team All-Conference USA honors. He set a program single-season record with 121 three-pointers.

On December 3, 2019, Wallace posted a junior season-high 31 points, nine rebounds and five assists in an 89–67 win over Texas A&M–Corpus Christi. He recorded the most free throws without a miss (15) in program history. As a junior, Wallace averaged 18.8 points, 4.5 rebounds and 3.1 assists per game, repeating on the Second Team All-Conference USA. On February 5, 2021, he recorded a senior season-high 33 points and seven rebounds in an 87–80 win against FIU. As a senior, Wallace averaged 16.8 points, 5.5 rebounds and 3.4 assists per game, and was named to the Second Team All-Conference USA for a third time. He left as the second-leading scorer in program history behind Jhivvan Jackson. Wallace declared for the 2021 NBA draft, forgoing his additional year of college eligibility.

== Professional career ==
=== Agua Caliente / Ontario Clippers (2021–2023) ===
After going undrafted in the 2021 NBA draft, Wallace joined the Memphis Grizzlies for the 2021 NBA Summer League. He was selected with the ninth pick of the second round of the 2021 NBA G League draft by the Wisconsin Herd and subsequently traded to the Agua Caliente Clippers, joining the team on October 27.

On February 21, 2023, Wallace agreed to a two-way contract with the Los Angeles Clippers. He was waived by the Clippers on March 1, without having played a game at the NBA level. On March 4, 2023, Wallace was reacquired by the Ontario Clippers.

=== Atlanta Hawks / College Park Skyhawks (2023–2026) ===
On August 31, 2023, Wallace's rights were traded to the College Park Skyhawks and on September 29, he signed with the Atlanta Hawks. However, he was waived on October 8. On October 29, he joined the College Park Skyhawks.

On July 15, 2024, Wallace signed a two-way contract with the Hawks.

Three years after going undrafted, Wallace finally made his NBA debut on October 27, 2024 in a 104 - 128 loss to the Oklahoma City Thunder where he recorded 2 points and 1 rebound in 3 minutes of playing time.

On January 15, 2025, Wallace scored a career-high 27 points in a 110-94 win against the Chicago Bulls. On April 13, Wallace recorded his first career triple-double, scoring 15 points, grabbing 11 rebounds, and recording 15 assists in a 117–105 win over the Orlando Magic. He made 31 total appearances (five starts) for Atlanta during the 2024–25 NBA season, averaging 5.4 points, 1.6 rebounds, and 2.6 assists.

On October 18, 2025, the Hawks converted Wallace's two-way contract into a standard contract.

=== Maccabi Tel Aviv (2026–present) ===
On August 9, 2026, Wallace signed a two-year deal with Maccabi Tel Aviv of the Israeli Premier League and the EuroLeague.

== Career statistics ==
Legend
GP	Games played	GS	Games started	MPG	Minutes per game
FG%	Field goal percentage	3P%	3-point field goal percentage	FT%	Free throw percentage
RPG	Rebounds per game	APG	Assists per game	SPG	Steals per game
BPG	Blocks per game	PPG	Points per game	**Bold**	Career high

=== NBA ===
==== Regular season ====
Year	Team	GP	GS	MPG	FG%	3P%	FT%	RPG	APG	SPG	BPG	PPG
2024–25	Atlanta	31	**5**	**16.2**	**.401**	.329	**1.000**	**1.6**	**2.6**	**.9**	**.3**	**5.4**
2025–26	Atlanta	**53**	3	10.1	.398	**.373**	.667	1.1	1.8	.5	.1	3.5
Career		84	8	12.3	.399	.353	.793	1.3	2.1	.6	.2	4.2

==== Playoffs ====
Year	Team	GP	GS	MPG	FG%	3P%	FT%	RPG	APG	SPG	BPG	PPG
2026	Atlanta	3	0	5.0	.250	.000	1.000	1.0	1.0	.3	.0	2.0
Career		3	0	5.0	.250	.000	1.000	1.0	1.0	.3	.0	2.0

=== College ===
Year	Team	GP	GS	MPG	FG%	3P%	FT%	RPG	APG	SPG	BPG	PPG
2017–18	UTSA	**35**	20	27.6	.365	.332	.742	3.1	2.7	.8	.4	11.4
2018–19	UTSA	32	**32**	**34.9**	**.422**	**.382**	**.856**	5.0	2.4	**1.3**	**.7**	**20.2**
2019–20	UTSA	32	**32**	34.8	.395	.351	.806	4.5	3.1	**1.3**	.3	18.8
2020–21	UTSA	26	26	33.6	.420	.319	.788	**5.5**	**3.4**	1.0	.3	16.8
Career		125	110	32.6	.401	.351	.806	4.4	2.8	1.1	.4	16.6

== Personal life ==
Wallace's younger brother, Cason, plays as a point guard for the Oklahoma City Thunder. He is a cousin of former NBA player Terrel Harris.
