= Tony Bradley (basketball) =

American basketball player (born 1998)

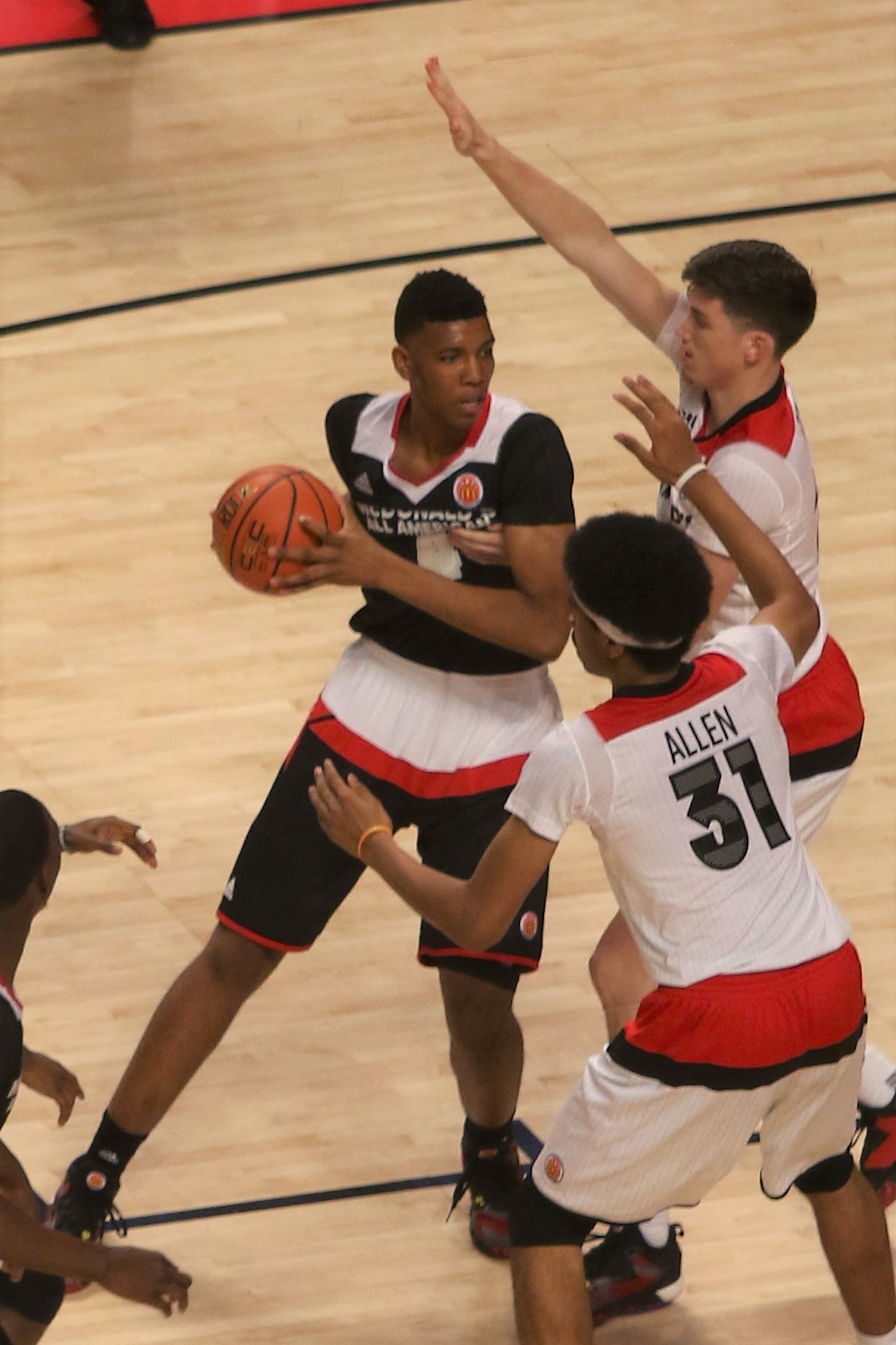
- Bradley in the 2016 McDonald's All-American Boys Game

No. 13 – Utah Jazz
- Position: Center / power forward
- League: NBA

Personal information
- Born: January 8, 1998 (age 28) Bartow, Florida, U.S.
- Listed height: 6 ft 10 in (2.08 m)
- Listed weight: 248 lb (112 kg)

Career information
- High school: Bartow (Bartow, Florida)
- College: North Carolina (2016–2017)
- NBA draft: 2017: 1st round, 28th overall pick
- Drafted by: Los Angeles Lakers
- Playing career: 2017–present

Career history
- 2017–2020: Utah Jazz
- 2017–2019: →Salt Lake City Stars
- 2020–2021: Philadelphia 76ers
- 2021: Oklahoma City Thunder
- 2021–2023: Chicago Bulls
- 2023–2024: Texas Legends
- 2024–2025: College Park Skyhawks
- 2025–2026: Indiana Pacers
- 2026: Atlanta Hawks
- 2026–present: Utah Jazz

Career highlights
- NCAA champion (2017); McDonald's All-American (2016); Florida Mr. Basketball (2016)
- Stats at NBA.com
- Stats at Basketball Reference

Tony Lee Bradley Jr. (born January 8, 1998) is an American professional basketball player for the Utah Jazz of the National Basketball Association (NBA). He played college basketball for the University of North Carolina (UNC). A 6 ft 10 in (2.08 m) center, Bradley was a primary substitute for the Tar Heels' 2017 NCAA championship team.

Bradley was selected by the Los Angeles Lakers with the 28th overall pick in the 2017 NBA draft, but was traded to the Utah Jazz on draft night. After three seasons with the Jazz, Bradley was ultimately traded to the Philadelphia 76ers in 2020 before being traded midseason to the Oklahoma City Thunder. He signed with the Chicago Bulls in the 2021 offseason and spent two seasons with the team. After a two-season stint in the NBA G League, Bradley signed with the Indiana Pacers, with whom he reached the 2025 NBA Finals.

== High school career ==
Born and raised in Bartow, Florida, Bradley played high school basketball for Bartow High School. He was named a McDonald's All-American in his senior year. Bradley chose North Carolina over Kansas, Florida, Florida State, Vanderbilt, Alabama, Miami and NC State. Bradley was rated as a five-star recruit and was ranked 17th in the ESPN 100 for the Class of 2016.

== College career ==
In his freshman season, Bradley served as the primary substitute for senior Kennedy Meeks, averaging 7.5 points and 5.1 rebounds in 14.6 minutes per game and providing strong offensive rebounding for the Tar Heels.

Following the Tar Heels' championship win over Gonzaga, Bradley announced that he would declare his eligibility for the 2017 NBA draft without signing an agent, leaving open the opportunity to return to UNC for his sophomore season. Bradley ultimately chose to remain in the NBA draft, becoming the third "one-and-done" player during Williams' tenure at UNC and the second among those to have won a national championship.

== Professional career ==
=== Utah Jazz (2017–2020) ===
Bradley was selected 28th overall by the Los Angeles Lakers in the 2017 NBA Draft with his draft rights traded to the Utah Jazz for Josh Hart (30th overall) and Thomas Bryant (42nd overall). On July 5, 2017, Bradley signed with the Jazz. He made his NBA debut on November 5 against the Houston Rockets. He was assigned to the Jazz's G League affiliate, the Salt Lake City Stars on November 7, and made his G League debut the next night, scoring 20 points in a loss to the Wisconsin Herd. Bradley made nine appearances for Utah during his rookie campaign, averaging 0.9 points, 1.2 rebounds and 0.1 assists.

Bradley made only three appearances for the Jazz during the 2018–19 NBA season, averaging 5.7 points, 5.0 rebounds and 0.3 assists. He entered the rotation for the 2019–20 NBA season, playing in 58 total games (including three starts), in which he averaged 4.9 points, 4.6 rebounds and 0.4 assists.

=== Philadelphia 76ers (2020–2021) ===
On November 22, 2020, Bradley and the draft rights to Saben Lee were traded to the Detroit Pistons in exchange for cash considerations. A day later, Bradley was traded to the Philadelphia 76ers in exchange for Zhaire Smith. He made 20 appearances (eight starts) for Philadelphia during the 2020–21 NBA season, averaging 5.5 points, 5.2 rebounds and 0.9 assists.

=== Oklahoma City Thunder (2021) ===
On March 25, 2021, Bradley was traded to the Oklahoma City Thunder in a three-way trade involving the New York Knicks. He made 22 appearances for the Thunder, averaging 8.7 points, 6.1 rebounds and 0.9 assists.

=== Chicago Bulls (2021–2023) ===
On August 19, 2021, Bradley signed with the Chicago Bulls. He made 55 appearances (seven starts) for Chicago during the 2021–22 NBA season, averaging 3.0 points, 3.4 rebounds and 0.5 assists.

Bradley made 12 appearances for the Bulls in the 2022–23 NBA season, logging averages of 1.6 points, 0.9 rebounds and 0.1 assists. On February 21, 2023, Bradley was waived by the Bulls.

=== Texas Legends (2023–2024) ===
On October 20, 2023, Bradley signed with the Dallas Mavericks, but was waived the same day. On October 29, he joined the G League's Texas Legends.

=== College Park Skyhawks (2024–2025) ===
On October 7, 2024, Bradley signed with the Atlanta Hawks, but was waived the next day. On October 26, he joined the G League's College Park Skyhawks.

=== Indiana Pacers (2025–2026) ===
On March 2, 2025, Bradley signed a 10-day contract with the Indiana Pacers. On March 13, he signed a second 10-day contract with the team. On March 23, the Pacers signed Bradley for the rest of the 2024–25 NBA season. In 14 appearances for Indiana, he averaged 4.4 points, 3.0 rebounds and 0.4 assists. The Pacers, along with Bradley, would go on to make the 2025 NBA Finals, but they would lose in seven games by the Oklahoma City Thunder.

On January 5, 2026, Bradley was waived by the Pacers, but on January 8, he was re-signed to another 10-day contract. On January 19, Bradley re-signed with the Pacers on a second 10-day contract.

=== Atlanta Hawks (2026) ===
On April 6, 2026, Bradley signed a rest-of-season contract with the Atlanta Hawks.

=== Return to Utah Jazz (2026–present) ===
On September 30, 2026, Bradley was signed to an Exhibit 9 contract by the New York Knicks. However, he was waived before the regular season and on October 17, 2026, Bradley was claimed off waivers by the Utah Jazz.

== Career statistics ==
Legend
GP	Games played	GS	Games started	MPG	Minutes per game
FG%	Field goal percentage	3P%	3-point field goal percentage	FT%	Free throw percentage
RPG	Rebounds per game	APG	Assists per game	SPG	Steals per game
BPG	Blocks per game	PPG	Points per game	**Bold**	Career high

=== NBA ===
==== Regular season ====
Year	Team	GP	GS	MPG	FG%	3P%	FT%	RPG	APG	SPG	BPG	PPG
2017–18	Utah	9	0	3.2	.273	.000	**1.000**	1.2	.1	.0	.0	.9
2018–19	Utah	3	0	12.0	.500	—	.500	5.0	.3	**.7**	.7	5.7
2019–20	Utah	**58**	3	11.4	.667	**1.000**	.652	4.6	.4	.2	.6	4.9
2020–21	Philadelphia	20	**8**	14.4	**.680**	.000	.636	5.2	**.9**	.3	.7	5.5
2020–21	Oklahoma City	22	0	**18.0**	.656	.000	.705	**6.1**	**.9**	.4	**.8**	**8.7**
2021–22	Chicago	55	7	10.0	.585	—	.655	3.4	.5	.2	.6	3.0
2022–23	Chicago	12	0	2.8	.500	.600	**1.000**	.9	.1	.1	.1	1.6
2024–25	Indiana	14	0	8.1	.644	.333	.333	3.0	.4	.1	.6	4.4
2025–26	Indiana	38	3	10.9	.557	.500	.744	2.8	.5	.2	.2	4.0
2025–26	Atlanta	3	1	11.3	.455	.500	–	3.0	.7	.0	.0	3.7
Career		234	22	10.9	.618	.474	.684	3.8	.5	.2	.5	4.3

==== Playoffs ====
Year	Team	GP	GS	MPG	FG%	3P%	FT%	RPG	APG	SPG	BPG	PPG
2018	Utah	1	0	2.0	.500	—	—	1.0	.0	.0	.0	2.0
2020	Utah	6	0	8.1	.222	—	.714	**3.8**	.2	.3	.3	1.5
2022	Chicago	2	0	4.0	**1.000**	—	—	2.0	.5	.0	.0	**5.0**
2025	Indiana	**11**	0	7.1	.444	.000	**.750**	1.9	.3	.0	.1	1.5
2026	Atlanta	4	0	**10.3**	.750	**1.000**	.667	2.8	**.8**	**.5**	**.8**	2.8
Career		24	0	7.4	.517	.500	.720	2.5	.3	.2	.3	2.0

=== College ===
Year	Team	GP	GS	MPG	FG%	3P%	FT%	RPG	APG	SPG	BPG	PPG
2016–17	North Carolina	38	0	14.6	.573	–	.619	5.1	.6	.3	.6	7.1
