= Nickeil Alexander-Walker =

Canadian basketball player (born 1998)

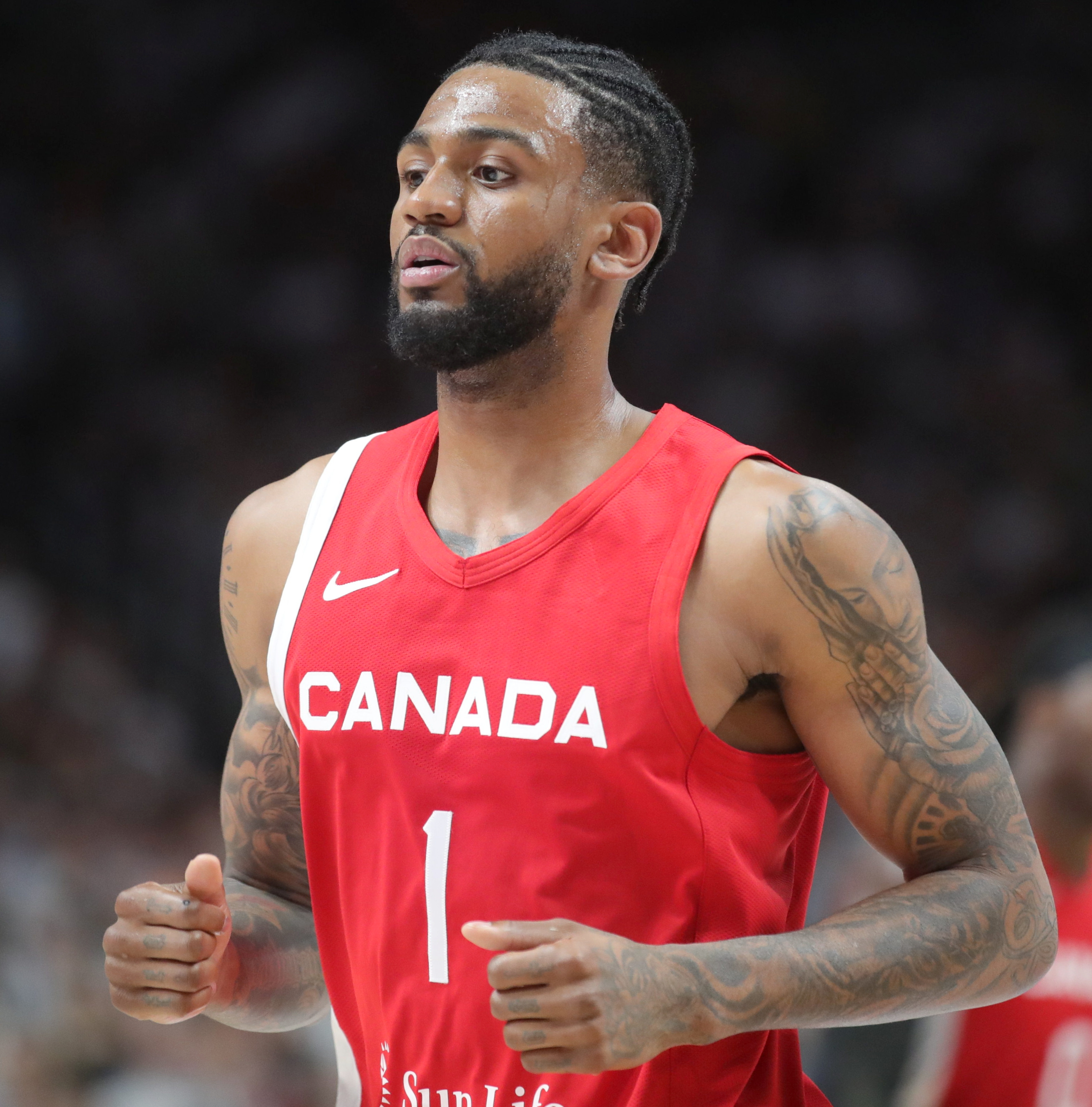
- Alexander-Walker with Canada in 2023

No. 7 – Atlanta Hawks
- Position: Shooting guard
- League: NBA

Personal information
- Born: September 2, 1998 (age 28) Toronto, Ontario, Canada
- Listed height: 6 ft 5 in (1.96 m)
- Listed weight: 205 lb (93 kg)

Career information
- High school: Vaughan Secondary School (Vaughan, Ontario); St. Louis Christian Academy (St. Louis, Missouri); Hamilton Heights Christian Academy (Chattanooga, Tennessee)
- College: Virginia Tech (2017–2019)
- NBA draft: 2019: 1st round, 17th overall pick
- Drafted by: Brooklyn Nets
- Playing career: 2019–present

Career history
- 2019–2022: New Orleans Pelicans
- 2020: →Erie Bayhawks
- 2022–2023: Utah Jazz
- 2023–2025: Minnesota Timberwolves
- 2025–present: Atlanta Hawks

Career highlights
- NBA Most Improved Player (2026); Third-team All-ACC (2019)
- Stats at NBA.com
- Stats at Basketball Reference
Medals
Men's basketball
Representing Canada
FIBA World Cup
Bronze medal – third place	2023 Philippines–Japan–Indonesia
FIBA Americas U18 Championship
Silver medal – second place	2016 Chile	Team

Nickeil Alexander-Walker (/nɪˈkiːl/ nih-KEEL; born September 2, 1998) is a Canadian professional basketball player for the Atlanta Hawks of the National Basketball Association (NBA). He played college basketball for the Virginia Tech Hokies. A versatile guard, Alexander-Walker was selected 17th overall by the Brooklyn Nets in the 2019 NBA draft but was traded shortly afterward to the New Orleans Pelicans. He has also played for the Utah Jazz and Minnesota Timberwolves before joining the Hawks. In 2026, Alexander-Walker became the first Canadian to win the NBA Most Improved Player award.

== High school career ==
A native of Toronto, Ontario, Alexander-Walker played basketball at Vaughan Secondary School, St. Louis Christian Academy, and Hamilton Heights Christian Academy. While at Hamilton Heights, he was teammates with his cousin, Shai Gilgeous-Alexander, and they shared a room at their coach's house during that time. According to Scout.com, he was ranked as the no. 74 prospect in the class of 2017.

== College career ==
Alexander-Walker committed to Virginia Tech in May 2016, over offers from USC and Maryland. As a freshman for the Hokies, Alexander-Walker averaged 10.7 points and 3.8 rebounds per game. In his second game in college, he scored a season-high 29 points in a 132–93 win over The Citadel. He helped lead Virginia Tech to a 21–12 record and NCAA tournament appearance. In the first-round loss to Alabama, Alexander-Walker scored 15 points.

As a sophomore, Alexander-Walker averaged 16.5 points, 4.1 rebounds and 4.0 assists per game during the regular season. He helped lead Virginia Tech to a 24–8 season, with a 12–6 record in the ACC and a 4 seed in the NCAA Tournament, where they advanced to the Sweet 16.

== Professional career ==
=== New Orleans Pelicans (2019–2022) ===
On June 20, 2019, Alexander-Walker was selected with the 17th overall pick by the Brooklyn Nets in the 2019 NBA draft. On July 6, his draft rights were traded to the Atlanta Hawks, alongside Allen Crabbe and draft considerations, in exchange for future teammate Taurean Prince; he was then immediately traded again to the New Orleans Pelicans. The next day, the Pelicans announced that they had signed Alexander-Walker. On October 22, Alexander-Walker made his NBA debut, coming off the bench in a 130–122 overtime loss to the Toronto Raptors. He finished the game with three points, four rebounds, two assists and two steals. On November 16, Alexander-Walker scored a career-high 27 points, while getting four rebounds and three assists in a 109–94 loss against the Miami Heat. On February 26, 2020, the Pelicans assigned Alexander-Walker to the Erie BayHawks of the NBA G League. On February 27, Alexander-Walker had 23 points, four rebounds, four assists and two steals in his first G League game, a 125–124 win over the Long Island Nets. Alexander-Walker made 47 appearances (including one start) for New Orleans during his rookie campaign, averaging 5.7 points, 1.8 rebounds, and 1.9 assists.

On January 13, 2021, Alexander-Walker started for the Pelicans and scored a career-high 37 points against the Los Angeles Clippers. Alexander-Walker made 46 appearances (including 13 starts) for the Pelicans during the 2020–21 NBA season, recording averages of 11.0 points, 3.1 rebounds, and 2.2 assists.

Alexander-Walker made 50 appearances (including 19 starts) for New Orleans to begin the 2021–22 season, averaging 12.8 points, 3.3 rebounds, and 2.8 assists.

=== Utah Jazz (2022–2023) ===
On February 8, 2022, the Portland Trail Blazers acquired Alexander-Walker, Josh Hart, Tomáš Satoranský, Didi Louzada, a protected 2022 first-round draft pick, the better of New Orleans' and Portland's 2026 second-round draft picks and New Orleans' 2027 second-round draft pick from the New Orleans Pelicans in exchange for future teammate CJ McCollum, Larry Nance Jr. and Tony Snell. A day later, Alexander-Walker was traded again, this time to the Utah Jazz in a three-team trade. He made 15 appearances (two starts) down the stretch for Utah, averaging 3.5 points, 1.5 rebounds, and 1.1 assists.

Alexander-Walker played in 36 appearances (including three starts) for the Jazz during the 2022–23 season, recording averages of 6.3 points, 1.6 rebounds, and 2.1 assists.

=== Minnesota Timberwolves (2023–2025) ===
On February 9, 2023, Alexander-Walker, Mike Conley Jr. and three second-round picks were traded to the Minnesota Timberwolves in a three-team trade with the Los Angeles Lakers, which sent Damian Jones, Russell Westbrook and Juan Toscano-Anderson to Utah and Malik Beasley, Jarred Vanderbilt, and D'Angelo Russell to Los Angeles. He made 23 appearances as a reserve over the remainder of the season, averaging 5.9 points, 1.8 rebounds, and 1.4 assists.

Alexander-Walker was re-signed by the Timberwolves to a two-year, $9 million contract on July 10, 2023. He made 82 appearances (20 starts) for the Timberwolves in the 2023–24 NBA season, logging averages of 8.0 points, 2.0 rebounds, and 2.5 assists.

Alexander-Walker played in all 82 games for the Timberwolves during the 2024–25 season, posting averages of 9.4 points, 3.2 rebounds, and 2.7 assists. On May 26, 2025, Alexander-Walker scored a playoff career-high 23 points in a 128–126 loss against the Oklahoma City Thunder in Game 4 of the 2025 Western Conference finals. The Timberwolves went on to lose the series in 5 games.

=== Atlanta Hawks (2025–present) ===
On July 6, 2025, Alexander-Walker signed a four-year, $62 million contract in a sign-and-trade with the Atlanta Hawks in exchange for a 2027 second-round pick and cash considerations. On March 16, 2026, he scored a career-high 41 points in a 124–112 win over the Orlando Magic. For the 2025–26 NBA season, Alexander-Walker won the NBA Most Improved Player award. He averaged 20.8 points per game during the season after averaging 9.4 the previous year, which marked the third-highest scoring increase by a player in the last 25 years. He also set the Hawks franchise record for most three-pointers made in a season with 251. His strong play helped the Hawks have a 46–36 record and clinch a guaranteed playoff spot as the sixth seed in the Eastern Conference.

In their first-round playoff series, the Hawks faced the New York Knicks. On April 18, Alexander-Walker made his playoff debut for the Hawks, recording 17 points and four assists in a 113–102 Game 1 loss. The Hawks would eventually lose the series in six games.

== National team career ==
Alexander-Walker competed for Canada at the 2016 FIBA Americas Under-18 Championship, leading the team to the silver medal. He led all scorers in the tournament with 17.4 points per game. He also competed for the Canadian senior national team in the 2020 FIBA Men's Olympic Qualifying Tournament.

On May 24, 2022, Alexander-Walker agreed to a three-year commitment to play with the Canadian senior men's national team. He was named to Canada's roster for the 2024 Summer Olympics in Paris.

== Career statistics ==
Legend
GP	Games played	GS	Games started	MPG	Minutes per game
FG%	Field goal percentage	3P%	3-point field goal percentage	FT%	Free throw percentage
RPG	Rebounds per game	APG	Assists per game	SPG	Steals per game
BPG	Blocks per game	PPG	Points per game	**Bold**	Career high

=== NBA ===
==== Regular season ====
Year	Team	GP	GS	MPG	FG%	3P%	FT%	RPG	APG	SPG	BPG	PPG
2019–20	New Orleans	47	1	12.6	.368	.346	.676	1.8	1.9	.4	.2	5.7
2020–21	New Orleans	46	13	21.9	.419	.347	.727	3.1	2.2	1.0	**.5**	11.0
2021–22	New Orleans	50	19	26.3	.375	.311	.722	3.3	2.8	.8	.4	12.8
2021–22	Utah	15	2	9.9	.333	.303	**.917**	1.5	1.1	1.1	.3	3.5
2022–23	Utah	36	3	14.7	**.488**	**.402**	.692	1.6	2.1	.7	.4	6.3
2022–23	Minnesota	23	0	15.5	.384	.361	.619	1.8	1.4	.3	.3	5.9
2023–24	Minnesota	**82**	20	23.4	.439	.391	.800	2.0	2.5	.8	**.5**	8.0
2024–25	Minnesota	**82**	10	25.3	.438	.381	.780	3.2	2.7	.6	.4	9.4
2025–26	Atlanta	78	**71**	**33.4**	.459	.399	.902	**3.4**	**3.7**	**1.3**	**.5**	**20.8**
Career		459	139	23.0	.427	.372	.807	2.6	2.5	.8	.4	10.6

==== Playoffs ====
Year	Team	GP	GS	MPG	FG%	3P%	FT%	RPG	APG	SPG	BPG	PPG
2022	Utah	1	0	4.7	**1.000**	—	**1.000**	1.0	1.0	**1.0**	.0	5.0
2023	Minnesota	5	4	29.6	.429	.400	.667	2.0	1.4	.6	.2	8.4
2024	Minnesota	**16**	1	23.6	.366	.296	**1.000**	1.8	2.3	.6	.4	7.3
2025	Minnesota	15	0	20.7	.389	.349	.882	1.8	2.3	.4	.3	8.3
2026	Atlanta	6	**6**	**35.5**	.380	**.419**	.667	**2.3**	**2.7**	.5	**.8**	**13.7**
Career		43	11	24.5	.387	.349	.826	1.9	2.2	.5	.4	8.6

=== College ===
Year	Team	GP	GS	MPG	FG%	3P%	FT%	RPG	APG	SPG	BPG	PPG
2017–18	Virginia Tech	33	33	25.4	.449	**.392**	.730	3.8	1.5	.8	**.5**	10.7
2018–19	Virginia Tech	**34**	**34**	**34.3**	**.474**	.374	**.778**	**4.1**	**4.0**	**1.9**	**.5**	**16.2**
Career		67	67	29.9	.464	.383	.763	4.0	2.7	1.4	.5	13.5

== Personal life ==
Alexander-Walker is Shai Gilgeous-Alexander’s first cousin—Alexander-Walker’s mother Nicole is the sister of Gilgeous-Alexander’s father Vaughn—and the two share a close relationship. Growing up, the cousins spent every weekend at each other’s houses and practiced basketball together during the summers.
