= Jonathan Kuminga =

Congolese basketball player (born 2002)

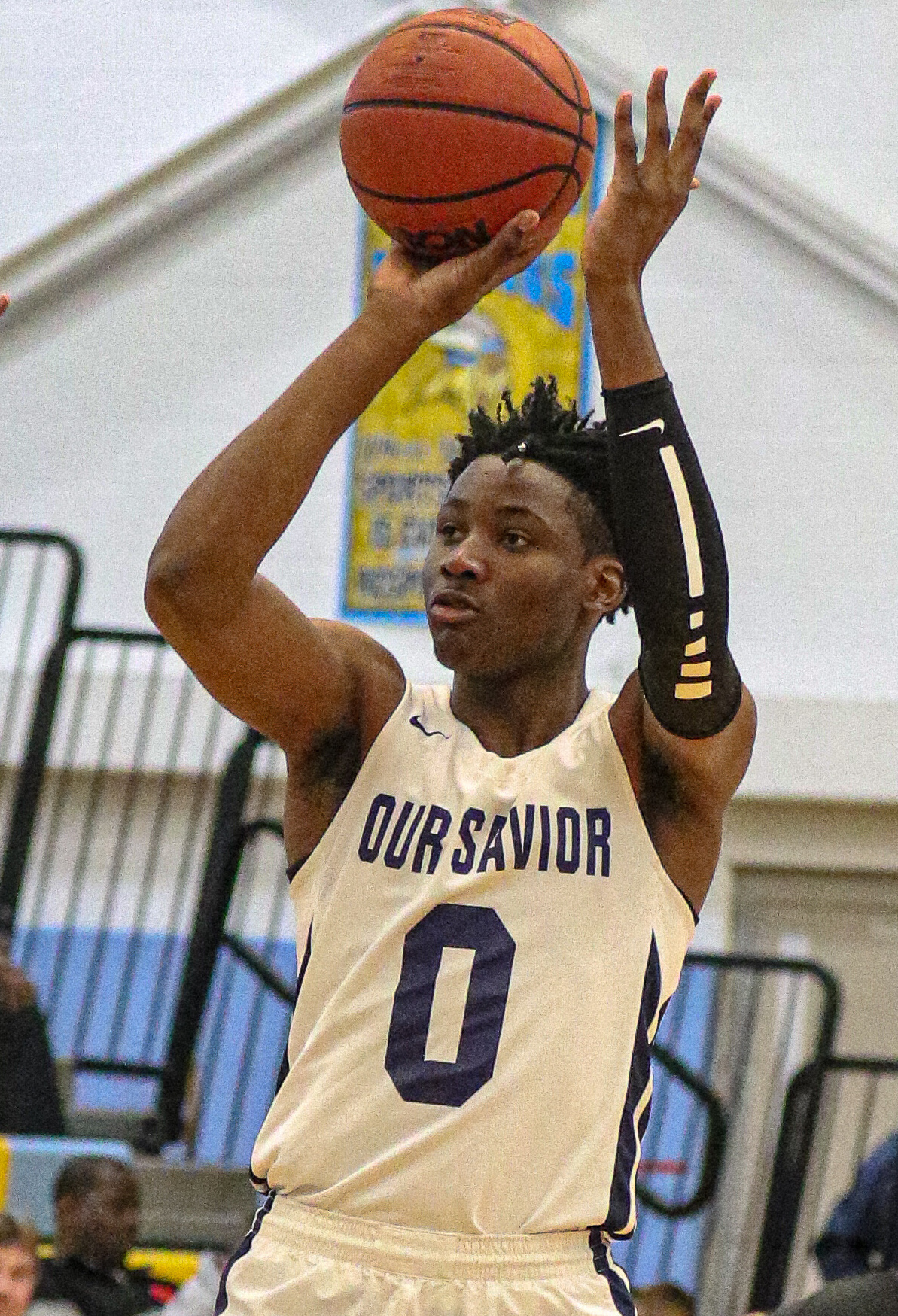
- Kuminga in 2018

No. 24 – Minnesota Timberwolves
- Position: Power forward / small forward
- League: NBA

Personal information
- Born: October 6, 2002 (age 24) Goma, DR Congo
- Listed height: 6 ft 7 in (2.01 m)
- Listed weight: 225 lb (102 kg)

Career information
- High school: Huntington Prep (Huntington, West Virginia); Our Savior New American (Centereach, New York); The Patrick School (Hillside, New Jersey)
- NBA draft: 2021: 1st round, 7th overall pick
- Drafted by: Golden State Warriors
- Playing career: 2020–present

Career history
- 2020–2021: NBA G League Ignite
- 2021–2026: Golden State Warriors
- 2021: →Santa Cruz Warriors
- 2026: Atlanta Hawks
- 2026–present: Minnesota Timberwolves

Career highlights
- NBA champion (2022)
- Stats at NBA.com
- Stats at Basketball Reference

Jonathan Malangu Kuminga (/kuːˈmɪŋɡə/ koo-MIN-guh; born October 6, 2002) is a Congolese professional basketball player for the Minnesota Timberwolves of the National Basketball Association (NBA). A consensus five-star recruit and the top small forward in the 2021 class, he chose to forgo his college eligibility and reclassify to the 2020 class to join the NBA G League Ignite. Kuminga finished his high school career at The Patrick School in Hillside, New Jersey.

The Golden State Warriors selected Kuminga with the seventh overall pick in the 2021 NBA draft. During his rookie season, he won an NBA championship with them in 2022.

== Early life ==
Kuminga began playing basketball in the Democratic Republic of the Congo at age two. In 2016, at 14 years old, he moved to the U.S. to play high school basketball.

== High school career ==
As a freshman, Kuminga played basketball for Huntington Prep School in Huntington, West Virginia. For his sophomore season, he transferred to Our Savior New American School in Centereach, New York and averaged 25 points, five rebounds, and five assists per game. In January 2019, Kuminga was named most valuable player of the Slam Dunk to the Beach showcase after scoring 40 points, a single-game record at the event, in a loss to Gonzaga College High School. He earned MaxPreps National Sophomore of the Year honors. After the season, Kuminga averaged 20.8 points, 5.2 rebounds and 3.3 assists per game for the NY Rens at the Nike Elite Youth Basketball League, facing many players older than him. He scored 43 points, shooting 7 of 11 from three-point range, against the Texas Titans, a team featuring top recruits Cade Cunningham and Greg Brown.

For his junior season, Kuminga transferred to The Patrick School in Hillside, New Jersey. On December 23, 2019, he made his season debut, scoring 20 points in a win over Roselle Catholic High School, after having been ruled ineligible for 30 days by the New Jersey State Interscholastic Athletic Association due to transfer rules. On January 3, 2020, Kuminga suffered an ankle sprain that sidelined him for about a month. As a junior, he averaged 16.2 points, 5.5 rebounds and 3.7 assists per game.

=== Recruiting ===
As a high school sophomore, Kuminga emerged as one of the best recruits in the 2021 class, with most recruiting services ranking him first in his class by the time he was a junior. On July 15, 2020, he reclassified to the 2020 class and announced that he would bypass college basketball to join the NBA G League Ignite over offers from Texas Tech, Auburn, Duke and Kentucky, among other college programs. At the end of his high school career, he was a consensus five-star recruit and the best small forward in the 2020 class. He was considered the third-best player in his class by Rivals.com and the fourth best by 247Sports.com and ESPN after reclassifying.

College recruiting
Name	Hometown	School	Height	Weight	Commit date
Jonathan Kuminga; SF	Kinshasa, DR Congo	The Patrick School (NJ)	6 ft 7 in (2.01 m)	225 lb (102 kg)	—
Jonathan Kuminga; SF	Recruit ratings: Rivals: 247Sports: ESPN: (96)				
Overall recruit ranking: Rivals: 3 247Sports: 4 ESPN: 4
Note: In many cases, Scout, Rivals, 247Sports, On3, and ESPN may conflict in their listings of height and weight.; In these cases, the average was taken. ESPN grades are on a 100-point scale.; Sources: "2020 Team Ranking". Rivals.

== Professional career ==
=== NBA G League Ignite (2020–2021) ===
On July 15, 2020, Kuminga signed a one-year contract with the NBA G League Ignite, a developmental team affiliated with the NBA G League. On February 10, 2021, he made his debut, recording 19 points, four assists and four rebounds in a 110–104 win over the Santa Cruz Warriors. Kuminga averaged 15.8 points, 7.2 rebounds and 2.7 assists per game.

=== Golden State Warriors (2021–2026) ===
The Golden State Warriors drafted Kuminga as the 7th pick in the 2021 NBA draft. On August 3, 2021, he signed with the Warriors. On October 30, Kuminga made his NBA debut, putting up three points and one steal in a 103–82 win over the Oklahoma City Thunder. On December 18, in his first career start, Kuminga put up a then career-high 26 points in a 119–100 loss to the Toronto Raptors. On February 18, 2022, Kuminga participated in the Rising Stars Challenge game for the 2022 NBA All-Star Game weekend, replacing the injured Chris Duarte. Kuminga ended his rookie season as an NBA champion after the Warriors defeated the Boston Celtics in the 2022 NBA Finals. At 19 years and 253 days, he became the second-youngest NBA champion, behind Darko Miličić.

On January 24, 2024, Kuminga scored 25 points on a perfect 11-for-11 from the field in a victory against the Atlanta Hawks. This performance tied Chris Mullin's Warriors franchise record for the most made shots in a game without a miss.

On December 27, 2024, Kuminga put up a career-high 34 points, along with 10 rebounds and five assists, in a 102–92 loss to the Los Angeles Clippers. On December 28, Kuminga put up a career-high-tying 34 points in a 109–105 win over the Phoenix Suns.

On January 4, 2025, Kuminga suffered a sprained ankle in a 121–113 win over the Memphis Grizzlies. He then missed 31 consecutive games before returning to action on March 13 in a 130–104 win against the Sacramento Kings, notching 18 points in just 20 minutes of action.

After a prolonged restricted free agency, which prevented the Warriors from making other signings, Kuminga signed a two-year, $48.5 million extension with the team on September 30, 2025. During a preseason game against the Portland Trail Blazers, Kuminga was assessed a technical foul and ejected after arguing with referee Rodney Mott, believing he was fouled on a drive to the rim. He was later fined $35,000 by the NBA for the incident. Kuminga made 20 appearances (including 13 starts) for the Warriors during the 2025–26 NBA season, recording averages of 12.1 points, 5.9 rebounds, and 2.5 assists.

=== Atlanta Hawks (2026) ===
On February 5, 2026, Kuminga and Buddy Hield were traded to the Atlanta Hawks in exchange for Kristaps Porziņģis. On February 24, Kuminga made his debut for the Hawks, scoring 27 points on 9-of-12 shooting and adding seven rebounds, four assists, and two steals in 24 minutes off the bench in a 119–98 win over the Washington Wizards. He also became the first player in Hawks franchise history to put up 25+ points in less than 30 minutes played in a debut. On March 18, Kuminga hit an accidental full court shot in a 135–120 win over the Dallas Mavericks.

The Hawks faced the New York Knicks during their first-round playoff series. On April 18, Kuminga made his playoff debut for the Hawks, recording eight points and four rebounds in a 113–102 Game 1 loss. On April 23, he put up 21 points, four rebounds, and a block in a 109–108 Game 3 win, which gave the Hawks a 2–1 series lead. The Hawks would go on to lose the series in six games. He became a free agent after Atlanta declined his $24.3 million team option.

=== Minnesota Timberwolves (2026–present) ===
On September 4, 2026, Kuminga signed a two-year, $12.4 million contract with the Minnesota Timberwolves. On October 21, he made his debut for the team, logging 12 points, three assists and four steals in a 131–106 win over the Miami Heat.

== National team career ==
In August 2022, Kuminga joined the DR Congo men's national basketball team for the African 2023 World Cup qualifiers. His older brother, Joel Ntambwe, was also on the roster. On August 26, 2022, he scored a team-high 18 points along with 6 rebounds for Congo in a 69–71 loss to Cameroon.

== Career statistics ==
Legend
GP	Games played	GS	Games started	MPG	Minutes per game
FG%	Field goal percentage	3P%	3-point field goal percentage	FT%	Free throw percentage
RPG	Rebounds per game	APG	Assists per game	SPG	Steals per game
BPG	Blocks per game	PPG	Points per game	**Bold**	Career high
†	Won an NBA championship

=== NBA ===
==== Regular season ====
Year	Team	GP	GS	MPG	FG%	3P%	FT%	RPG	APG	SPG	BPG	PPG
2021–22†	Golden State	70	12	16.9	.513	.336	.684	3.3	.9	.4	.3	9.3
2022–23	Golden State	67	16	20.8	.525	**.370**	.652	3.4	1.9	.6	**.5**	9.9
2023–24	Golden State	**74**	**46**	**26.3**	**.529**	.321	**.746**	4.8	2.2	.7	**.5**	**16.1**
2024–25	Golden State	47	10	24.3	.454	.305	.668	4.6	2.2	.8	.4	15.3
2025–26	Golden State	20	13	23.8	.454	.321	.742	**5.9**	**2.5**	.4	.3	12.1
2025–26	Atlanta	16	1	22.1	.476	.346	.702	5.3	2.1	**.9**	.3	12.3
Career		294	98	22.1	.502	.332	.699	4.2	1.8	.6	.4	12.5

==== Playoffs ====
Year	Team	GP	GS	MPG	FG%	3P%	FT%	RPG	APG	SPG	BPG	PPG
2022†	Golden State	**16**	**3**	8.6	.500	.231	**.769**	1.7	.5	.2	.1	5.2
2023	Golden State	10	0	6.1	**.542**	**.429**	.556	.9	.5	.2	.0	3.4
2025	Golden State	8	1	23.4	.484	.400	.710	2.5	**1.3**	**.5**	**.5**	**15.3**
2026	Atlanta	6	0	**26.0**	.483	.208	.731	**3.3**	1.0	**.5**	**.5**	13.7
Career		40	4	13.6	.494	.304	.717	1.9	.7	.3	.2	8.0

== Personal life ==
Kuminga's older brother, Joel Ntambwe, played college basketball for UNLV before transferring to Texas Tech in 2019. Two of his cousins play professional basketball: Emmanuel Mudiay in Puerto Rico, and Omari Gudul in Europe. Kuminga's first language is French and he is continuing to learn English.
