= Onsi Saleh =

American and Canadian basketball executive

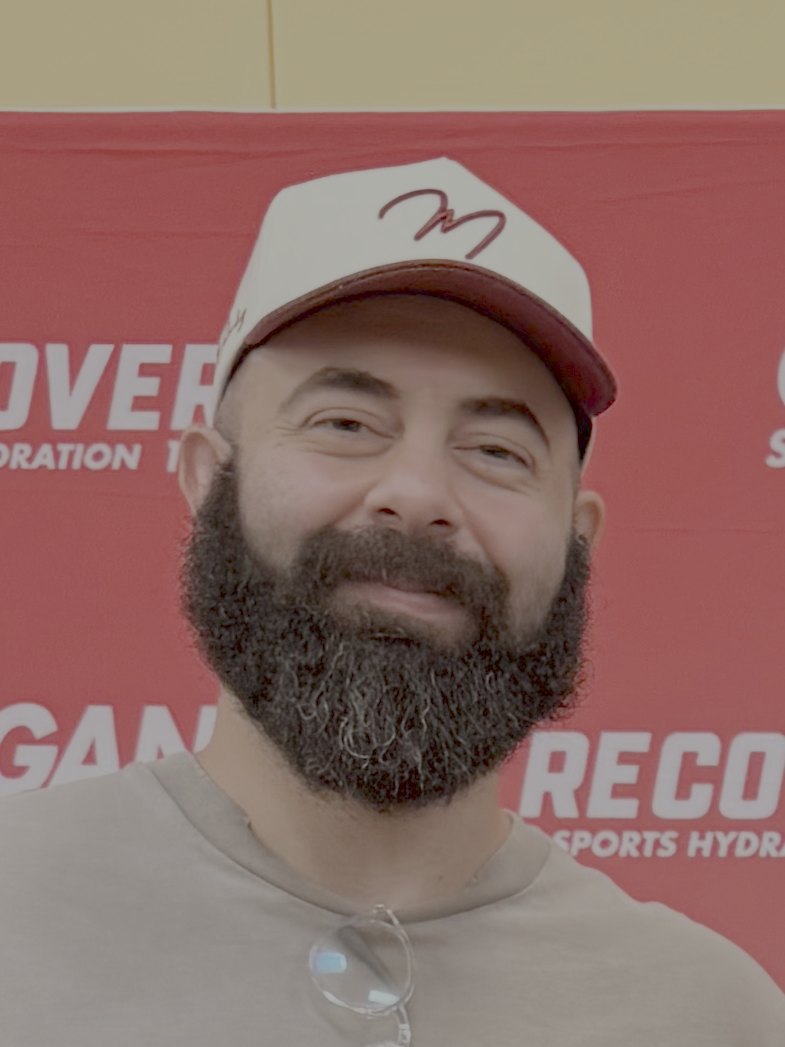
- Saleh in April 2026

Atlanta Hawks
- Position: General manager
- League: NBA

Personal information
- Born: Austin, Texas, U.S

Career information
- College: University of Alberta (BSc, BA); Tulane University (JD)

Onsi Saleh is an American‐Canadian basketball executive who is currently the president of basketball operations of the Atlanta Hawks of the National Basketball Association (NBA). Prior to joining the Hawks, Saleh worked for the San Antonio Spurs and the Golden State Warriors. He moved to the Atlanta Hawks in 2024 as assistant general manager and was promoted to general manager the following year.

== Early and college life ==
Saleh is of Palestinian descent. He was born in Austin, Texas, U.S., but was raised in Edmonton, Alberta, Canada, where he eventually started playing basketball and attended Ross Sheppard High School. Saleh graduated from the University of Alberta with a bachelor’s degree in biological sciences and an after-degree in history. He later earned his Juris Doctor degree from Tulane University Law School in 2017.

== Executive career ==
Saleh was hired by the San Antonio Spurs in 2019, where over his time he served as the team’s director of strategy and process and chief of staff. Ahead of the 2023 season, Saleh joined the Golden State Warriors as the vice president of basketball strategy and team counsel in 2022–23, and basketball strategy/assistant team counsel in 2021–22. In 2024, he joined the Atlanta Hawks to serve as the team's assistant general manager. On April 21, 2025, after former general manager Landry Fields was fired, Saleh was promoted by the Hawks to serve as the team's general manager. On May 27, 2026, Saleh signed a contract extension and was promoted to president of basketball operations.
