= College Park Skyhawks =

American professional basketball team of the NBA G League

- Conference: Eastern
- League: NBA G League
- Founded: 2017
- History: Erie BayHawks; 2017–2019; College Park Skyhawks; 2019–present
- Arena: Gateway Center Arena
- Location: College Park, Georgia, U.S.
- Team colors: Red, yellow, black, gray
- Team manager: Tori Miller
- Head coach: Steve Klei
- Ownership: Atlanta Hawks
- Affiliation: Atlanta Hawks
- Championships: 0
- Division titles: 1 (2017–18)
- Website: cpskyhawks.gleague.nba.com

The College Park Skyhawks are an American professional basketball team in the NBA G League based in College Park, Georgia. They are affiliated with the Atlanta Hawks, and play their home games at Gateway Center Arena at College Park after the franchise played its first two seasons in Erie, Pennsylvania, at the Erie Insurance Arena as the Erie BayHawks. The team became the sixteenth D-League team to be owned by an NBA team.

== History ==
On November 10, 2016, the Atlanta Hawks announced that they had bought and established a new NBA D-League team to play in a new arena in nearby College Park beginning with the 2019–20 season. In December 2016, the Orlando Magic purchased the original BayHawks franchise with the intent of relocating it to Florida for the 2017–18 season, eventually becoming the Lakeland Magic. In February 2017, the original BayHawks owners negotiated with the Atlanta Hawks to activate their franchise early and play as the BayHawks until the new arena in College Park is completed. The new Hawks' minor league franchise then became the BayHawks and began play in the rebranded NBA G League for the 2017–18 season.

The Hawks announced on February 21, 2019, that their G League affiliate would be known as the College Park Skyhawks when the team moved to Georgia for the 2019–20 season. On May 10, 2019, the Hawks announced that rapper and College Park native 2 Chainz would join the Skyhawks' ownership group.

== Season-by-season ==
Season	Division	Regular season				Postseason results
Season	Division	Finish	Wins	Losses	Win %	Postseason results
Erie BayHawks
2017–18	Southeast	1st	28	22	.560	Won First Round (Lakeland) 96–90; Won Conference Semifinal (Fort Wayne) 119–116; Lost Conference Final (Raptors 905) 106–118
2018–19	Southeast	4th	24	26	.480	
College Park Skyhawks
2019–20	Southeast	3rd	20	23	.465	Season cancelled by COVID-19 pandemic
2020–21	Opted out of single-site season					
2021–22	Eastern	3rd	20	13	.606	Lost Conference Quarterfinal (Capital City) 122–131
2022–23	Eastern	11th	15	17	.469	
2023–24	Eastern	8th	17	17	.500	
2024–25	Eastern	9th	17	17	.500	
Regular season record			141	135	.511	
Playoff record			2	2	.500	

== Current roster ==
College Park Skyhawks roster
Players

Pos.	No.	Player	Height	Weight	DOB	From
G/F	1	Chandler Baker	6 ft 5 in (1.96 m)	185 lb (84 kg)	2001-11-27	Colgate
G	4	Derrin Boyd	6 ft 3 in (1.91 m)	215 lb (98 kg)	2000-12-10	College of Charleston
G	10	RayJ Dennis (TW)	6 ft 1 in (1.85 m)	180 lb (82 kg)	2001-03-30	Baylor
G	51	Keshon Gilbert (TW)	6 ft 4 in (1.93 m)	200 lb (91 kg)	2003-06-30	Iowa State
C	–	William Baker	6 ft 11 in (2.11 m)	240 lb (109 kg)	2000-12-31	LSU
F	–	Jalen Wilson (TW)	6 ft 6 in (1.98 m)	220 lb (100 kg)	2000-11-04	Kansas

Coaches
Head coach
- Steve Klei
Assistant(s)
- Bryan George
- O'Neil Holder
- Seth Jackson
- Kari Korver
- Enzo Li
- Dustin Ware

Legend
- (DP) Unsigned draft pick
- (FA) Free agent
- (S) Suspended
- (P) Prospects
- (NBA) On assignment from NBA affiliate
- (TW) Two-way affiliate player
- Injured

Roster
Updated: March 4, 2026

== Head coaches ==
#	Head coach	Term	Regular season				Playoffs				Achievements
#	Head coach	Term	G	W	L	Win%	G	W	L	Win%	Achievements
1	Josh Longstaff	2017–2018	50	28	22	.560	3	2	1	.667	
2	Noel Gillespie	2018–2021	93	44	49	.473	—	—	—	—	
3	Steve Gansey	2021–2023	65	35	30	.538	1	0	1	.000	
4	Ryan Schmidt	2023–2024	34	17	17	.500	0	0	0	–	
5	Steve Klei	2024–2026	34	17	17	.500	0	0	0	–	
6	Sanjay Lumpkin	2026–present				–	0	0	0	–	

== NBA affiliates ==
=== Erie BayHawks (2017–19) ===
- Atlanta Hawks (2017–2019)

=== College Park Skyhawks ===
- Atlanta Hawks (2019–present)
