= Gersson Rosas =

Colombian-American executive (born 1978)

Personal information
- Born: June 11, 1978 (age 48) Bogotá, Colombia

Career information
- College: University of Houston (BA)
- Position: Executive

Career history
- 2003–2006: Houston Rockets (Personnel Scout/Video Coordinator)
- 2006–2013: Houston Rockets (Executive VP of basketball operations)
- 2013: Dallas Mavericks (General manager)
- 2013–2019: Houston Rockets (Executive VP of basketball operations)
- 2019–2021: Minnesota Timberwolves (President of basketball operations)
- 2022–2026: New York Knicks (Senior vice president of basketball operations)

Career highlights
- As general manager: NBA champion (2026); NBA Cup champion (2025); 2× NBA D-League champion (2010, 2013)

Gersson Rosas (born June 11, 1978) is a basketball executive who most recently served as the Senior Vice President of Basketball Operations and general manager for the New York Knicks. Rosas is the NBA's first Latino President and General Manager of Basketball Operations. Rosas was the president of basketball operations of the Minnesota Timberwolves of the National Basketball Association (NBA). He was previously the Executive Vice President of Basketball Operations for the Houston Rockets, where he worked for 16 seasons, and served under Daryl Morey. Rosas was briefly GM of the Dallas Mavericks. Over 22 seasons in the NBA, Rosas' organizations have reached the NBA playoffs in 16 seasons. He has also worked for Team USA Basketball as an international scout since 2015.

== Early life and education ==
Born in Bogotá, Colombia, Rosas immigrated to the U.S. with his family when he was three years old. He attended the University of Houston from 1996 to 2000, graduating cum laude with degrees in marketing and international business.

== Career ==
=== Houston Rockets ===
Rosas joined the Houston Rockets front office in 2003. He began working under general manager Carroll Dawson and stayed on after Dawson's retirement, to become a trusted confidant of his replacement Daryl Morey. During his career with the Rockets, Rosas served various roles, beginning as a Personnel Scout/Video Coordinator for three seasons, and ultimately worked his way up to Executive Vice President of Basketball Operations, where he worked closely with Morey. Secondarily, he served as Director of Player Personnel, Director of Scouting, and General Manager for Houston's D-League affiliate, the Rio Grande Valley Vipers. The Vipers made the D-League finals in all four of Rosas' seasons as GM, winning the D-League Championship twice.

During Rosas's tenure in Houston the Rockets made the playoffs 12 times, advancing to the Western Conference Finals in 2015 and 2018. In 2017–18, the Rockets were owners of the NBA's best record (65–17), top offense in the league and a dynamic style of defense. Rosas played significant roles in developing the team's philosophy and roster, including the successful pursuits of Most Valuable Player James Harden and All-Star Chris Paul via trade acquisitions along with the free agent recruitment of P.J. Tucker and Eric Gordon. In addition, he was a leading force in the past draft selections of Clint Capela and Montrezl Harrell; trade acquisitions of Kyle Lowry, Goran Dragic and Luis Scola, and past free agent acquisitions of Dwight Howard and Patrick Beverley. Rosas also played a key role in head coach and coaching staff hires in the NBA (Mike D’Antoni, Kevin McHale) and NBA G League (Chris Finch, Nick Nurse).

Rosas was initially hired to be the Dallas Mavericks general manager in 2013, becoming the first Latino GM in the NBA, but left the post after only 3 months. The departure was caused by disagreements regarding his level of control over the teams' basketball operations, which was intended to be supplementary to president of basketball operations Donnie Nelson. Rosas then returned to Houston.

Rosas was additionally named international player personnel scout for United States men's national basketball team in 2015.

=== Minnesota Timberwolves ===
After six more seasons in Houston, Rosas was hired by the Minnesota Timberwolves as their president of basketball operations on May 1, 2019, in place of Tom Thibodeau.

Rosas overhauled the team in his first season; in the 2019 NBA draft, he traded up for the No. 6 pick to select guard Jarrett Culver, and drafted guard Jaylen Nowell from Washington in the second round. Rosas traded for forward Jake Layman and signed undrafted free agent center Naz Reid. In February 2020, the organization acquired guards D'Angelo Russell and Malik Beasley, as well as forwards Juancho Hernangómez and Jarred Vanderbilt. By the end of the midseason trade deadline, only two inherited players remained. The Timberwolves finished with a 19–45 record amid the 2020 NBA Bubble, but won the first pick in the draft lottery, which Rosas used to select Anthony Edwards in the 2020 NBA draft. During the 2020-21 NBA season, Rosas hired Chris Finch as the team's 16th head coach.

=== New York Knicks ===
Rosas was hired by the New York Knicks as a senior basketball advisor in February 2022. He was promoted to Senior Vice President of Basketball Operations in 2023. Rosas along with Leon Rose, Knicks team president, pieced together the Knicks team that won the 2026 NBA championship. On August 3, 2026, it was Rosas announced would be departing the Knicks organization.

Sporting positions
Preceded by Scott Layden	Minnesota Timberwolves General Manager; 2019–2021	Succeeded by Sachin Gupta
Preceded by Scott Perry	New York Knicks General Manager; 2023–present	Incumbent
