= 2021–22 Minnesota Timberwolves season =

2021–22 NBA season by team

- Head coach: Chris Finch
- General manager: Sachin Gupta
- Owner: Glen Taylor
- Arena: Target Center

Results
- Record: 46–36 (.561)
- Place: Division: 3rd (Northwest); Conference: 7th (Western)
- Playoff finish: First round (lost to Grizzlies 2–4)
- Stats at Basketball Reference

Local media
- Television: Bally Sports North
- Radio: WCCO

The 2021–22 Minnesota Timberwolves season was the 33rd season of the franchise in the National Basketball Association (NBA). The regular season for the league began on October 19, 2021, and featuread the normal 82-game schedule for the first time since the 2018–19 season. On September 22, 2021, general manager Gersson Rosas was fired, and was subsequently replaced by Sachin Gupta.

With a win over the Milwaukee Bucks on March 19, the Timberwolves clinched their first winning season since 2018, and only their second winning season since 2005. After a win over the Los Angeles Clippers in the play-in tournament on April 12, 2022, the Timberwolves clinched their first playoff berth since 2018. However, they lost to the Memphis Grizzlies in the first round in six games.

== Previous season ==
The Timberwolves concluded the 2020–21 season with 23–49 record, finishing last in the Northwest Division and thirteenth in the Western Conference.

== NBA draft ==
The Timberwolves did not hold any picks in the 2021 NBA draft, as they have traded both selections to the Golden State Warriors alongside Andrew Wiggins in 2020. The first-round pick was conveyed to Golden State after falling outside the top three following the NBA draft lottery, while the second-round pick was conveyed to the Oklahoma City Thunder as a replacement for Golden State's first-round pick that failed to convey due to its top-20 protection after the Warriors missed the 2021 NBA playoffs.

== Roster ==
2021–22 Minnesota Timberwolves roster
Players

Pos.	No.	Player	Height	Weight	DOB	From
G	5	Malik Beasley	6 ft 4 in (1.93 m)	187 lb (85 kg)	1996-11-26	Florida State
G	22	Patrick Beverley	6 ft 1 in (1.85 m)	180 lb (82 kg)	1988-07-12	Arkansas
F	9	Leandro Bolmaro	6 ft 7 in (2.01 m)	200 lb (91 kg)	2000-09-11	Argentina
G	1	Anthony Edwards	6 ft 4 in (1.93 m)	225 lb (102 kg)	2001-08-05	Georgia
F/C	13	Nathan Knight (TW)	6 ft 10 in (2.08 m)	253 lb (115 kg)	1997-09-20	William & Mary
F	10	Jake Layman	6 ft 9 in (2.06 m)	209 lb (95 kg)	1994-03-07	Maryland
F	3	Jaden McDaniels	6 ft 9 in (2.06 m)	185 lb (84 kg)	2000-09-29	Washington
G	6	Jordan McLaughlin	5 ft 11 in (1.80 m)	185 lb (84 kg)	1996-04-09	USC
C	55	Greg Monroe	6 ft 11 in (2.11 m)	250 lb (113 kg)	1990-06-04	Georgetown
G	4	Jaylen Nowell	6 ft 4 in (1.93 m)	201 lb (91 kg)	1999-07-09	Washington
G	20	Josh Okogie	6 ft 4 in (1.93 m)	213 lb (97 kg)	1998-09-01	Georgia Tech
F	12	Taurean Prince	6 ft 7 in (2.01 m)	218 lb (99 kg)	1994-03-22	Baylor
C	11	Naz Reid	6 ft 10 in (2.08 m)	264 lb (120 kg)	1999-08-26	LSU
G	0	D'Angelo Russell	6 ft 4 in (1.93 m)	193 lb (88 kg)	1996-02-23	Ohio State
F/C	32	Karl-Anthony Towns	7 ft 0 in (2.13 m)	248 lb (112 kg)	1995-11-15	Kentucky
F	8	Jarred Vanderbilt	6 ft 9 in (2.06 m)	214 lb (97 kg)	1999-04-03	Kentucky
G	25	McKinley Wright (TW)	5 ft 11 in (1.80 m)	192 lb (87 kg)	1998-10-25	Colorado

Coaches
Head coach
- Chris Finch
Assistant(s)
- Kevin Burleson
- Kevin Hanson
- Micah Nori
- Pablo Prigioni
- Elston Turner

Legend
- (DP) Unsigned draft pick
- (FA) Free agent
- (S) Suspended
- (GL) On assignment to G League affiliate
- (TW) Two-way affiliate player
- Injured

Roster
Updated: April 11, 2022

== Standings ==
=== Division ===
Northwest Division	W	L	PCT	GB	Home	Road	Div	GP
y – Utah Jazz	49	33	.598	–	29‍–‍12	20‍–‍21	15–1	82
x – Denver Nuggets	48	34	.585	1.0	23‍–‍18	25‍–‍16	6–10	82
x – Minnesota Timberwolves	46	36	.561	3.0	26‍–‍15	20‍–‍21	12–4	82
Portland Trail Blazers	27	55	.329	22.0	17‍–‍24	10‍–‍31	1–15	82
Oklahoma City Thunder	24	58	.293	25.0	12‍–‍29	12‍–‍29	6–10	82

=== Conference ===
Western Conference
#	Team	W	L	PCT	GB	GP
1	z – Phoenix Suns *	64	18	.780	–	82
2	y – Memphis Grizzlies *	56	26	.683	8.0	82
3	x – Golden State Warriors	53	29	.646	11.0	82
4	x – Dallas Mavericks	52	30	.634	12.0	82
5	y – Utah Jazz *	49	33	.598	15.0	82
6	x – Denver Nuggets	48	34	.585	16.0	82
7	x – Minnesota Timberwolves	46	36	.561	18.0	82
8	pi – Los Angeles Clippers	42	40	.512	22.0	82
9	x – New Orleans Pelicans	36	46	.439	28.0	82
10	pi − San Antonio Spurs	34	48	.415	30.0	82
11	Los Angeles Lakers	33	49	.402	31.0	82
12	Sacramento Kings	30	52	.366	34.0	82
13	Portland Trail Blazers	27	55	.329	37.0	82
14	Oklahoma City Thunder	24	58	.293	40.0	82
15	Houston Rockets	20	62	.244	44.0	82

== Game log ==
=== Preseason ===
2021 preseason game log
Total: 3–1 (home: 1-0; road: 2-1)
Preseason: 3–1 (home: 1–0; road: 2–1)

Game	Date	Team	Score	High points	High rebounds	High assists	Location Attendance	Record
1	October 4	New Orleans	W 117–114	D'Angelo Russell (19)	Towns, Vanderbilt (7)	Patrick Beverley (6)	Target Center; 5,715	1–0
2	October 8	@ Denver	W 114–112 (OT)	Malik Beasley (13)	Jarred Vanderbilt (8)	D'Angelo Russell (6)	Ball Arena; 11,927	2–0
3	October 11	@ L.A. Clippers	W 128–100	D'Angelo Russell (19)	Karl-Anthony Towns (9)	D'Angelo Russell (9)	Toyota Arena; 4,850	3–0
4	October 14	@ Brooklyn	L 101–107	Anthony Edwards (23)	Karl-Anthony Towns (8)	Karl-Anthony Towns (6)	Barclays Center; 11,210	3–1

2021–22 season schedule

=== Regular season ===
2021–22 game log
Total: 46–36 (home: 26–15; road: 20–21)
October: 3–2 (home: 2–2; road: 1–0)

Game	Date	Team	Score	High points	High rebounds	High assists	Location Attendance	Record
1	October 20	Houston	W 124–106	Karl-Anthony Towns (30)	Karl-Anthony Towns (10)	D'Angelo Russell (7)	Target Center; 16,079	1–0
2	October 23	New Orleans	W 96–89	Karl-Anthony Towns (25)	Anthony Edwards (9)	Patrick Beverley (6)	Target Center; 15,343	2–0
3	October 25	New Orleans	L 98–107	Karl-Anthony Towns (32)	Karl-Anthony Towns (14)	Karl-Anthony Towns (7)	Target Center; 14,435	2–1
4	October 27	@ Milwaukee	W 113–108	D'Angelo Russell (29)	Jarred Vanderbilt (13)	Patrick Beverley (7)	Fiserv Forum; 17,341	3–1
5	October 30	Denver	L 91–93	Malik Beasley (18)	Anthony Edwards (11)	D'Angelo Russell (6)	Target Center; 17,136	3–2

November: 8–8 (home: 5–5; road: 3–3)

Game	Date	Team	Score	High points	High rebounds	High assists	Location Attendance	Record
6	November 1	Orlando	L 97–115	Anthony Edwards (24)	Karl-Anthony Towns (16)	Karl-Anthony Towns (6)	Target Center; 14,744	3–3
7	November 3	L.A. Clippers	L 115–126	Anthony Edwards (28)	Karl-Anthony Towns (11)	Patrick Beverley (8)	Target Center; 15,386	3–4
8	November 5	L.A. Clippers	L 84–104	Karl-Anthony Towns (20)	Towns, Vanderbilt (8)	Jordan McLaughlin (5)	Target Center; 17,136	3–5
9	November 7	@ Memphis	L 118–125 (OT)	Anthony Edwards (27)	Karl-Anthony Towns (13)	D'Angelo Russell (7)	FedExForum; 12,416	3–6
10	November 10	@ Golden State	L 110–123	Anthony Edwards (48)	Karl-Anthony Towns (12)	Beverley, Russell (7)	Chase Center; 18,064	3–7
11	November 12	@ L.A. Lakers	W 107–83	Karl-Anthony Towns (29)	Beverley, Towns (7)	D'Angelo Russell (7)	Staples Center; 18,997	4–7
12	November 13	@ L.A. Clippers	L 102–129	Anthony Edwards (21)	Anthony Edwards (9)	D'Angelo Russell (8)	Staples Center; 15,285	4–8
13	November 15	Phoenix	L 94–99	Karl-Anthony Towns (35)	Karl-Anthony Towns (13)	Anthony Edwards (6)	Target Center; 16,279	4–9
14	November 17	Sacramento	W 107–97	Karl-Anthony Towns (22)	Jarred Vanderbilt (7)	Beverley, Russell (7)	Target Center; 13,108	5–9
15	November 18	San Antonio	W 115–90	Karl-Anthony Towns (25)	Towns, Vanderbilt (12)	Anthony Edwards (6)	Target Center; 13,572	6–9
16	November 20	Memphis	W 138–95	D'Angelo Russell (28)	Jarred Vanderbilt (10)	D'Angelo Russell (5)	Target Center; 17,136	7–9
17	November 22	@ New Orleans	W 110–96	Karl-Anthony Towns (28)	Karl-Anthony Towns (10)	D'Angelo Russell (8)	Smoothie King Center; 15,689	8–9
18	November 24	Miami	W 113–101	Anthony Edwards (33)	Jarred Vanderbilt (15)	Edwards, Russell (6)	Target Center; 17,136	9–9
19	November 26	@ Charlotte	L 115–133	Karl-Anthony Towns (25)	Jarred Vanderbilt (8)	Karl-Anthony Towns (6)	Spectrum Center; 19,314	9–10
20	November 27	@ Philadelphia	W 121–120 (OT)	Karl-Anthony Towns (28)	Jarred Vanderbilt (14)	D'Angelo Russell (8)	Wells Fargo Center; 21,011	10–10
21	November 29	Indiana	W 100–98	Karl-Anthony Towns (32)	Anthony Edwards (9)	D'Angelo Russell (11)	Target Center; 14,191	11–10

December: 5–9 (home: 3–4; road: 2–5)

Game	Date	Team	Score	High points	High rebounds	High assists	Location Attendance	Record
22	December 1	@ Washington	L 107–115	Karl-Anthony Towns (34)	Karl-Anthony Towns (10)	D'Angelo Russell (9)	Capital One Arena; 15,318	11–11
23	December 3	@ Brooklyn	L 105–110	D'Angelo Russell (21)	Jarred Vanderbilt (15)	D'Angelo Russell (11)	Barclays Center; 17,732	11–12
24	December 6	Atlanta	L 110–121	Karl-Anthony Towns (31)	Karl-Anthony Towns (16)	Anthony Edwards (7)	Target Center; 15,736	11–13
25	December 8	Utah	L 104–136	Karl-Anthony Towns (22)	Karl-Anthony Towns (7)	Edwards, Towns (5)	Target Center; 15,181	11–14
26	December 10	Cleveland	L 106–123	Karl-Anthony Towns (21)	Jarred Vanderbilt (8)	Patrick Beverley (7)	Target Center; 15,694	11–15
27	December 12	@ Portland	W 116–111	Anthony Edwards (24)	Karl-Anthony Towns (10)	D'Angelo Russell (5)	Moda Center; 16,591	12–15
28	December 15	@ Denver	W 124–107	Anthony Edwards (38)	Russell, Vanderbilt (8)	Patrick Beverley (8)	Ball Arena; 15,365	13–15
29	December 17	L.A. Lakers	W 110–92	Karl-Anthony Towns (28)	Jarred Vanderbilt (16)	Patrick Beverley (7)	Target Center; 17,136	14–15
30	December 19	Dallas	W 111–105	Karl-Anthony Towns (24)	Jarred Vanderbilt (10)	Karl-Anthony Towns (6)	Target Center; 16,127	15–15
31	December 21	@ Dallas	L 102–114	Karl-Anthony Towns (26)	Karl-Anthony Towns (14)	D'Angelo Russell (12)	American Airlines Center; 20,056	15–16
32	December 23	@ Utah	L 102–114	Malik Beasley (33)	Naz Reid (10)	D'Angelo Russell (14)	Vivint Arena; 18,306	15–17
33	December 27	Boston	W 108–103	Jaylen Nowell (29)	Nathan Knight (11)	Jordan McLaughlin (10)	Target Center; 15,962	16–17
34	December 28	New York	L 88–96	Malik Beasley (20)	Beverley, Knight (7)	Patrick Beverley (7)	Target Center; 16,339	16–18
35	December 31	@ Utah	L 108–120	Anthony Edwards (26)	Reid, Vanderbilt (7)	Patrick Beverley (6)	Vivint Arena; 18,306	16–19

January: 9–6 (home: 4–0; road: 5–6)

Game	Date	Team	Score	High points	High rebounds	High assists	Location Attendance	Record
36	January 2	@ L.A. Lakers	L 103–108	Naz Reid (23)	Jarred Vanderbilt (12)	Patrick Beverley (6)	Crypto.com Arena; 18,343	16–20
37	January 3	@ L.A. Clippers	W 122–104	Anthony Edwards (28)	Jarred Vanderbilt (9)	Patrick Beverley (12)	Crypto.com Arena; 15,959	17–20
38	January 5	Oklahoma City	W 98–90	Anthony Edwards (22)	Karl-Anthony Towns (16)	Patrick Beverley (6)	Target Center; 14,375	18–20
39	January 7	@ Oklahoma City	W 135–105	D'Angelo Russell (27)	Jarred Vanderbilt (16)	D'Angelo Russell (12)	Paycom Center; 14,874	19–20
40	January 9	@ Houston	W 141–123	Karl-Anthony Towns (40)	Jarred Vanderbilt (19)	D'Angelo Russell (10)	Toyota Center; 15,277	20–20
41	January 11	@ New Orleans	L 125–128	Anthony Edwards (28)	Karl-Anthony Towns (8)	D'Angelo Russell (10)	Smoothie King Center; 15,155	20–21
42	January 13	@ Memphis	L 108–116	Anthony Edwards (30)	Jarred Vanderbilt (13)	Beverley, Russell (6)	FedEx Forum; 15,881	20–22
43	January 16	Golden State	W 119–99	Karl-Anthony Towns (26)	Karl-Anthony Towns (11)	D'Angelo Russell (12)	Target Center; 17,136	21–22
44	January 18	@ New York	W 112–110	Anthony Edwards (21)	Jarred Vanderbilt (7)	Patrick Beverley (6)	Madison Square Garden; 16,071	22–22
45	January 19	@ Atlanta	L 122–134	D'Angelo Russell (31)	Karl-Anthony Towns (10)	Karl-Anthony Towns (7)	State Farm Arena; 15,199	22–23
46	January 23	Brooklyn	W 136–125	Anthony Edwards (25)	Jarred Vanderbilt (9)	D'Angelo Russell (10)	Target Center; 16,475	23–23
47	January 25	@ Portland	W 109–107	Anthony Edwards (40)	Karl-Anthony Towns (17)	Jarred Vanderbilt (6)	Moda Center; 16,422	24–23
48	January 27	@ Golden State	L 115–124	Karl-Anthony Towns (31)	Karl-Anthony Towns (12)	Edwards, Towns (6)	Chase Center; 18,064	24–24
49	January 28	@ Phoenix	L 124–134	Anthony Edwards (27)	Karl-Anthony Towns (9)	Anthony Edwards (10)	Footprint Center; 17,071	24–25
50	January 30	Utah	W 126–106	Karl-Anthony Towns (31)	Karl-Anthony Towns (11)	Karl-Anthony Towns (10)	Target Center; 10,407	25–25

February: 8–4 (home: 4–2; road: 4–2)

Game	Date	Team	Score	High points	High rebounds	High assists	Location Attendance	Record
51	February 1	Denver	W 130–115	Karl-Anthony Towns (24)	Karl-Anthony Towns (10)	McLaughlin, Towns (7)	Target Center; 15,839	26–25
52	February 3	@ Detroit	W 128–117	Anthony Edwards (25)	Karl-Anthony Towns (14)	Patrick Beverley (7)	Little Caesars Arena; 15,523	27–25
53	February 6	Detroit	W 118–105	Karl-Anthony Towns (24)	Karl-Anthony Towns (12)	D'Angelo Russell (8)	Target Center; 16,487	28–25
54	February 8	@ Sacramento	W 134–114	Karl-Anthony Towns (25)	Jarred Vanderbilt (11)	Jordan McLaughlin (11)	Golden 1 Center; 12,409	29–25
55	February 9	@ Sacramento	L 119–132	D'Angelo Russell (29)	Jarred Vanderbilt (11)	D'Angelo Russell (10)	Golden 1 Center; 12,527	29–26
56	February 11	@ Chicago	L 122–134	Anthony Edwards (31)	Karl-Anthony Towns (8)	Edwards, Towns (8)	United Center; 20,092	29–27
57	February 13	@ Indiana	W 129–120	Anthony Edwards (37)	Karl-Anthony Towns (13)	D'Angelo Russell (6)	Gainbridge Fieldhouse; 13,532	30–27
58	February 15	Charlotte	W 126–120 (OT)	Karl-Anthony Towns (39)	Karl-Anthony Towns (15)	D'Angelo Russell (11)	Target Center; 17,136	31–27
59	February 16	Toronto	L 91–103	Karl-Anthony Towns (24)	Karl-Anthony Towns (11)	D'Angelo Russell (7)	Target Center; 15,982	31–28
60	February 24	Memphis	W 119–114	D'Angelo Russell (37)	Jarred Vanderbilt (12)	D'Angelo Russell (9)	Target Center; 16,326	32–28
61	February 25	Philadelphia	L 102–133	Karl-Anthony Towns (25)	Jarred Vanderbilt (8)	Anthony Edwards (5)	Target Center; 16,684	32–29
62	February 28	@ Cleveland	W 127–122	D'Angelo Russell (25)	Jarred Vanderbilt (9)	Jordan McLaughlin (7)	Rocket Mortgage FieldHouse; 18,421	33–29

March: 10–5 (home: 7–1; road: 3–4)

Game	Date	Team	Score	High points	High rebounds	High assists	Location Attendance	Record
63	March 1	Golden State	W 129–114	Karl-Anthony Towns (39)	Karl-Anthony Towns (9)	Beverley, Russell (7)	Target Center; 17,136	34–29
64	March 4	@ Oklahoma City	W 138–101	Reid, Towns (20)	Towns, Vanderbilt (8)	Patrick Beverley (8)	Paycom Center; 15,180	35–29
65	March 5	Portland	W 135–121	Karl-Anthony Towns (36)	Karl-Anthony Towns (15)	D'Angelo Russell (15)	Target Center; 17,136	36–29
66	March 7	Portland	W 124–81	Karl-Anthony Towns (27)	Karl-Anthony Towns (13)	Patrick Beverley (7)	Target Center; 16,035	37–29
67	March 9	Oklahoma City	W 132–102	Malik Beasley (33)	Karl-Anthony Towns (11)	D'Angelo Russell (12)	Target Center; 16,191	38–29
68	March 11	@ Orlando	L 110–118	Anthony Edwards (25)	Karl-Anthony Towns (13)	D'Angelo Russell (7)	Amway Center; 14,557	38–30
69	March 12	@ Miami	W 113–104	Jaylen Nowell (16)	Reid, Towns (10)	D'Angelo Russell (9)	FTX Arena; 19,600	39–30
70	March 14	@ San Antonio	W 149–139	Karl-Anthony Towns (60)	Karl-Anthony Towns (17)	Patrick Beverley (8)	AT&T Center; 14,143	40–30
71	March 16	L.A. Lakers	W 124–104	Karl-Anthony Towns (30)	Jarred Vanderbilt (9)	D'Angelo Russell (6)	Target Center; 17,136	41–30
72	March 19	Milwaukee	W 138–119	Edwards, Towns (25)	Karl-Anthony Towns (11)	D'Angelo Russell (9)	Target Center; 17,136	42–30
73	March 21	@ Dallas	L 108–110	Karl-Anthony Towns (22)	Towns, Vanderbilt (8)	Beverley, Rusell (4)	American Airlines Center; 20,077	42–31
74	March 23	Phoenix	L 116–125	Anthony Edwards (19)	Jarred Vanderbilt (12)	D'Angelo Russell (7)	Target Center; 17,136	42–32
75	March 25	Dallas	W 115–96	Karl-Anthony Towns (20)	Karl-Anthony Towns (9)	D'Angelo Russell (8)	Target Center; 17,136	43–32
76	March 27	@ Boston	L 112–134	Anthony Edwards (24)	Anthony Edwards (5)	Edwards, Russell (6)	TD Garden; 19,156	43–33
77	March 30	@ Toronto	L 102–125	Anthony Edwards (24)	Karl-Anthony Towns (10)	Jordan McLaughlin (5)	Scotiabank Arena; 19,800	43–34

April: 3–2 (home: 1–2; road: 2–0)

Game	Date	Team	Score	High points	High rebounds	High assists	Location Attendance	Record
78	April 1	@ Denver	W 136–130	Karl-Anthony Towns (32)	Karl-Anthony Towns (9)	Anthony Edwards (7)	Ball Arena; 19,612	44–34
79	April 3	@ Houston	W 139–132	Anthony Edwards (33)	Karl-Anthony Towns (11)	D'Angelo Russell (9)	Toyota Center; 16,539	45–34
80	April 5	Washington	L 114–132	Karl-Anthony Towns (26)	Karl-Anthony Towns (10)	D'Angelo Russell (11)	Target Center; 17,136	45–35
81	April 7	San Antonio	W 127–121	Anthony Edwards (49)	Karl-Anthony Towns (13)	Edwards, Beverley (8)	Target Center; 17,136	46–35
82	April 10	Chicago	L 120–124	Nathan Knight (17)	Nathan Knight (8)	Greg Monroe (5)	Target Center; 17,136	46–36

2021–22 season schedule

=== Play-in ===
2022 play-in game log
Total: 1–0 (home: 1–0; road: 0–0)
Play-in: 1–0 (home: 1–0; road: 0–0)

Game	Date	Team	Score	High points	High rebounds	High assists	Location Attendance	Record
1	April 12	LA Clippers	W 109–104	Anthony Edwards (30)	Patrick Beverley (12)	D'Angelo Russell (6)	Target Center; 17,136	1–0

2021–22 season schedule

=== Playoffs ===
2021–22 game log
Total: 2–4 (home: 1–2; road: 1–2)
First Round: 2–4 (home: 1–2; road: 1–2)

Game	Date	Team	Score	High points	High rebounds	High assists	Location Attendance	Record
1	April 16	@ Memphis	W 130–117	Anthony Edwards (36)	Karl-Anthony Towns (13)	D'Angelo Russell (9)	FedExForum; 17,794	1–0
2	April 19	@ Memphis	L 96–124	Anthony Edwards (20)	Karl-Anthony Towns (11)	Russell, Beverley, McLaughlin	FedExForum; 17,794	1–1
3	April 21	Memphis	L 95–104	D'Angelo Russell (22)	Jarred Vanderbilt (13)	D'Angelo Russell (8)	Target Center; 19,364	1–2
4	April 23	Memphis	W 119–118	Karl-Anthony Towns (33)	Karl-Anthony Towns (14)	D'Angelo Russell (7)	Target Center; 19,832	2–2
5	April 26	@ Memphis	L 109–111	Karl-Anthony Towns (28)	Karl-Anthony Towns (12)	D'Angelo Russell (8)	FedExForum; 17,794	2–3
6	April 29	Memphis	L 106–114	Anthony Edwards (30)	Karl-Anthony Towns (10)	Anthony Edwards (5)	Target Center; 20,323	2–4

2021–22 season schedule

== Player statistics ==
=== Regular season ===
Player	POS	GP	GS	MP	REB	AST	STL	BLK	PTS	MPG	RPG	APG	SPG	BPG	PPG
Malik Beasley	SG	79	18	1,976	227	116	43	12	953	25.0	2.9	1.5	.5	.2	12.1
Naz Reid	C	77	6	1,215	301	71	40	71	637	15.8	3.9	.9	.5	.9	8.3
Karl-Anthony Towns	C	74	74	2,476	727	269	72	83	1,818	33.5	9.8	3.6	1.0	1.1	24.6
Jarred Vanderbilt	PF	74	67	1,880	624	94	99	46	512	25.4	8.4	1.3	1.3	.6	6.9
Anthony Edwards	SG	72	72	2,466	343	275	105	46	1,533	34.3	4.8	3.8	1.5	.6	21.3
Jaden McDaniels	PF	70	31	1,803	293	79	52	54	647	25.8	4.2	1.1	.7	.8	9.2
Taurean Prince	PF	69	8	1,177	174	68	47	23	502	17.1	2.5	1.0	.7	.3	7.3
D'Angelo Russell	PG	65	65	2,077	216	460	62	22	1,176	32.0	3.3	7.1	1.0	.3	18.1
Jordan McLaughlin	PG	62	3	902	94	180	57	10	233	14.5	1.5	2.9	.9	.2	3.8
Jaylen Nowell	SG	62	1	975	123	130	27	10	527	15.7	2.0	2.1	.4	.2	8.5
Patrick Beverley	PG	58	54	1,476	240	268	67	52	533	25.4	4.1	4.6	1.2	.9	9.2
Josh Okogie	SG	49	6	516	70	25	26	12	133	10.5	1.4	.5	.5	.2	2.7
Nathan Knight	PF	37	2	267	85	22	7	8	138	7.2	2.3	.6	.2	.2	3.7
Leandro Bolmaro	SF	35	2	241	43	21	6	0	50	6.9	1.2	.6	.2	.0	1.4
Jake Layman	SF	34	1	231	36	9	7	5	81	6.8	1.1	.3	.2	.1	2.4
McKinley Wright IV	PG	5	0	19	0	3	0	0	5	3.8	.0	.6	.0	.0	1.0
Greg Monroe^{†}	C	4	0	81	24	16	4	6	29	20.3	6.0	4.0	1.0	1.5	7.3
Chris Silva^{†}	PF	1	0	3	1	0	0	0	0	3.0	1.0	.0	.0	.0	.0

- ^{†} Denotes player spent time with another team in the season. Stats reflect time with the Timberwolves only.

=== Playoffs ===
Player	POS	GP	GS	MP	REB	AST	STL	BLK	PTS	MPG	RPG	APG	SPG	BPG	PPG
Anthony Edwards	SG	6	6	227	25	18	7	7	151	37.8	4.2	3.0	1.2	1.2	25.2
Karl-Anthony Towns	C	6	6	222	65	13	4	12	131	37.0	10.8	2.2	.7	2.0	21.8
D'Angelo Russell	PG	6	6	196	15	40	9	0	72	32.7	2.5	6.7	1.5	.0	12.0
Patrick Beverley	PG	6	6	194	19	29	7	7	66	32.3	3.2	4.8	1.2	1.2	11.0
Jarred Vanderbilt	PF	6	6	129	43	4	7	2	33	21.5	7.2	.7	1.2	.3	5.5
Jaden McDaniels	PF	6	0	130	17	4	2	11	56	21.7	2.8	.7	.3	1.8	9.3
Malik Beasley	SG	6	0	119	20	4	2	1	51	19.8	3.3	.7	.3	.2	8.5
Jordan McLaughlin	PG	5	0	83	12	17	5	0	31	16.6	2.4	3.4	1.0	.0	6.2
Taurean Prince	PF	5	0	65	8	6	2	1	30	13.0	1.6	1.2	.4	.2	6.0
Naz Reid	C	5	0	54	14	0	1	6	24	10.8	2.8	.0	.2	1.2	4.8
Greg Monroe	C	2	0	7	2	1	2	0	4	3.5	1.0	.5	1.0	.0	2.0
Jaylen Nowell	SG	1	0	12	0	1	1	0	6	12.0	.0	1.0	1.0	.0	6.0
Josh Okogie	SG	1	0	2	0	0	0	0	0	2.0	.0	.0	.0	.0	.0

== Transactions ==
=== Trades ===
August 3, 2021	To Minnesota Timberwolves Taurean Prince; 2022 WAS second−round pick Cash considerations	To Cleveland Cavaliers Ricky Rubio
August 25, 2021	To Minnesota Timberwolves Patrick Beverley	To Memphis Grizzlies Jarrett Culver; Juancho Hernangómez

=== Free agency ===
==== Additions ====
Player	Signed	Former team
Nathan Knight	Two-way contract (August 6, 2021)	Atlanta Hawks
McKinley Wright IV	Two-way contract (August 6, 2021)	Colorado
