= Monte McNair =

American basketball executive (born 1984)

Los Angeles Clippers
- Position: Advisor
- League: NBA

Personal information
- Born: May 30, 1984 (age 42) Oak Park, California, U.S.

Career information
- High school: Oak Park (Oak Park, California)

Career highlights
- NBA Executive of the Year (2023)

Monte McNair (born May 30, 1984) is an American sports executive who is an advisor for the Los Angeles Clippers of the National Basketball Association (NBA). McNair formerly served as executive at Houston Rockets and Sacramento Kings.

== Early life and education ==
McNair grew up in Oak Park, California, and attended Oak Park High School.

McNair earned a Bachelor of Science degree in computer science from Princeton University in 2006. While attending college, McNair was a wide receiver on the football team. From 2006 to 2007, he was a sports programmer and researcher at STATS LLC.

== Career ==
=== Houston Rockets ===
In 2007, McNair joined the Houston Rockets as the basketball operations senior analyst. McNair was then promoted to director of basketball operations in 2013, VP of basketball operations in 2016, and assistant GM in 2018. While working for the Rockets team, his organization reached the NBA playoffs for eight consecutive years, including two Western Conference Finals appearances. Highly regarded executive Daryl Morey (who was the president of basketball operations of the Rockets at this time) said in 2018, "Monte has been absolutely critical to the success of the Rockets over his long tenure."

=== Sacramento Kings ===
After former Kings GM Vlade Divac, Kings assistant GM Peja Stojaković, and Stockton Kings GM Anthony McClishand stepped down in late 2020, the Kings organization made Joe Dumars their interim executive vice president of basketball operations. Divac and the Kings traded DeMarcus Cousins to New Orleans in 2017 and chose to draft Marvin Bagley III in 2018, one pick ahead of Luka Dončić. The Kings had missed the postseason for the past 14 consecutive seasons going back to 2006 - the longest active drought and one shy of the NBA record held by the Buffalo/San Diego/Los Angeles Clippers. During this extended playoff drought, the Kings had 10 different head coaches.

On September 17, 2020, the Sacramento Kings announced the hire of McNair as the general manager and president of basketball operations. Owner Vivek Ranadivé said, "I am excited to bring his extensive experience and vision onboard to lead our basketball operations department."

The Kings also interviewed Sachin Gupta (Timberwolves' EVP of basketball operations), Wes Wilcox (Hawks' former GM), and Calvin Booth (GM of the Nuggets) for the position.

In October 2020, McNair hired three employees to his front office: former Hawks GM Wes Wilcox as assistant GM, former 76ers director of scouting Phil Jabour as VP of player personnel, and OKC Blue assistant GM Paul Johnson as director of basketball operations. The group will join Ken Catanella, who remains with the team as an assistant GM.

One of the largest problems that McNair faced was filling the shooting guard position as Bogdan Bogdanović was a free agent in the 2020 offseason. The Kings selected Tyrese Haliburton with the 12th pick in the 2020 NBA draft. In the 2021 NBA draft, McNair and the Kings showed they wanted to improve their defense after having a historically bad defensive year. They showed this by drafting Davion Mitchell with the 9th overall pick.

On January 24, 2023, McNair signed a multi–year contract extension with the Kings. On May 3, McNair was named the NBA Executive of the Year, after leading the Kings to a 48–34 record and their first playoff berth since the 2005–06 season. He also hired Mike Brown, the 2022–23 NBA Coach of the Year, the first person to win the award unanimously.

On April 17, 2025, McNair and the Kings agreed to mutually part ways.

=== Los Angeles Clippers ===
On June 16, 2025, McNair was hired as an advisor for the Los Angeles Clippers.

== See also ==
- List of NBA team presidents
