= Tim Connelly =

American basketball executive (born 1976)

Minnesota Timberwolves
- Position: President of basketball operations / General manager
- League: NBA

Personal information
- Born: May 15, 1976 (age 50) Baltimore, Maryland, U.S.

Career information
- College: Fordham University & Catholic University

Timothy Martin Connelly (born May 15, 1976) is an American basketball executive who is the president of basketball operations of the Minnesota Timberwolves of the National Basketball Association (NBA). He previously worked for the Washington Wizards and New Orleans Hornets, before becoming president of basketball operations at the Denver Nuggets. He worked for the Nuggets from June 2013 onwards, until May 23, 2022, when Connelly agreed to a five-year, $40 million contract with the Minnesota Timberwolves to take over in the same role within the organization.

== Early life ==
Tim Connelly was raised in Baltimore, Maryland. He grew up with four other brothers and two sisters. After attending Fordham University in New York, Connelly transferred to Catholic University in Washington, D.C. for his junior year.

== Executive career ==
=== Washington Wizards ===
In his junior year, Connelly wrote to Chuck Douglas, the director of college scouting for the Washington Wizards. He became an intern for the Wizards in 1996 in the basketball operations department. He became an assistant video coordinator in 1999. Connelly became a full-time scout in 2000, and was promoted to director of player personnel. During his tenure with the Wizards, Connelly worked under NBA legend Wes Unseld.

=== New Orleans Hornets ===
In 2010, Connelly joined the front office of the New Orleans Hornets. He became assistant general manager under Dell Demps. Connelly's duties included scouting, trade negotiations, player contracts, and draft preparations.

=== Denver Nuggets ===
On June 17, 2013, Connelly was named as the executive vice president of basketball operations and general manager of the Denver Nuggets. He replaced former NBA Executive of the Year, Masai Ujiri. On June 15, 2017, it was announced that Connelly would be promoted to president of basketball operations for the purpose of retaining assistant general manager Artūras Karnišovas as the team's general manager. After missing out on the playoffs for five years under his tenure, Connelly and Karnišovas would help lead the team to the 2019 NBA playoffs. Under his leadership, the Nuggets were able to acquire several prospects through the draft, including Nikola Jokic, Gary Harris, Jamal Murray, Monté Morris, and Michael Porter Jr..

In 2020, Connelly finished in ninth place for the Executive of the Year Award.

In 2021, Connelly was responsible in part for bringing over Aaron Gordon, while giving up longtime Nugget Harris in the process. Connelly claimed to have asked for permission from All-Star center Nikola Jokić before making the Gordon trade. The Nuggets won the 2023 NBA Finals with the core that Connelly built.

=== Minnesota Timberwolves ===
On May 23, 2022, Connelly was hired by the Minnesota Timberwolves as the president of basketball operations. He was reportedly signed to a 5-year, $40 million contract by the Timberwolves. On July 6, 2022, Connelly traded five picks and five players for a 4-time NBA Defensive Player of the Year Award winner Rudy Gobert.

== Personal life ==
All four of Connelly's brothers, Pat, Joe, Dan, and Kevin, work as scouts or managers in the NBA or college basketball. Pat was previously the assistant general manager of the Phoenix Suns, while Joe works for the Washington Wizards in player development, Dan is an advanced scout for the Utah Jazz, and Kevin runs a scouting service for high school players. Connelly is a fan of the Baltimore Ravens and Baltimore Orioles. Connelly is married to wife, Negah. They have three children.

== See also ==
- List of NBA team presidents

Sporting positions
Preceded by Masai Ujiri	Denver Nuggets General Manager; 2013–2022	Succeeded by Calvin Booth
Preceded by Sachin Gupta	Minnesota Timberwolves General Manager; 2022–2024	Succeeded by Matt Lloyd
