= Patrick Beverley =

American basketball player (born 1988)

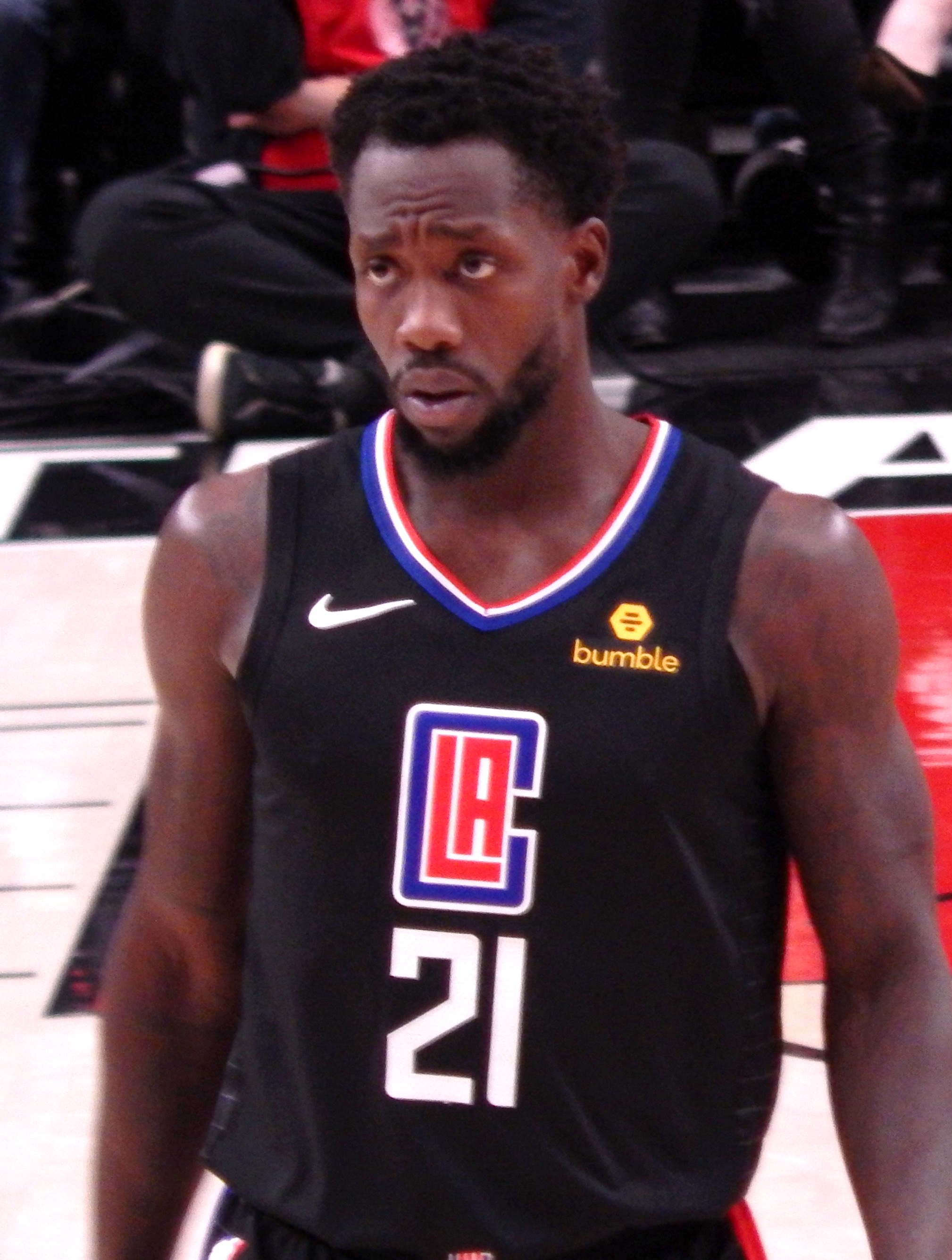
- Beverley with the Los Angeles Clippers in 2018

No. 21 – Boulazac Basket Dordogne
- Position: Point guard
- League: LNB Élite

Personal information
- Born: July 12, 1988 (age 38) Chicago, Illinois, U.S.
- Listed height: 6 ft 2 in (1.88 m)
- Listed weight: 180 lb (82 kg)

Career information
- High school: Waubonsie Valley (Aurora, Illinois); John Marshall Metropolitan (Chicago, Illinois)
- College: Arkansas (2006–2008)
- NBA draft: 2009: 2nd round, 42nd overall pick
- Drafted by: Los Angeles Lakers
- Playing career: 2008–present

Career history
- 2008–2009: Dnipro
- 2009–2010: Olympiacos
- 2011–2012: Spartak St. Petersburg
- 2013–2017: Houston Rockets
- 2013: →Rio Grande Valley Vipers
- 2017–2021: Los Angeles Clippers
- 2021–2022: Minnesota Timberwolves
- 2022–2023: Los Angeles Lakers
- 2023: Chicago Bulls
- 2023–2024: Philadelphia 76ers
- 2024: Milwaukee Bucks
- 2024–2025: Hapoel Tel Aviv
- 2025–2026: PAOK Thessaloniki
- 2026–present: Boulazac Basket Dordogne

Career highlights
- NBA All-Defensive First Team (2017); 2× NBA All-Defensive Second Team (2014, 2020); EuroCup MVP (2012); All-EuroCup First Team (2012); 2× Russian League All-Symbolic First Team (2011, 2012); Russian Cup winner (2011); Russian League Defensive Player of the Year (2011); Russian League All-Star (2011); Russian League Guard of the Year (2011); Greek Cup winner (2010); UBL All-Star (2009); UBL Slam Dunk Contest champion (2009); Second-team All-SEC (2007); SEC Freshman of the Year (2007); SEC All-Freshman Team (2007)
- Stats at NBA.com
- Stats at Basketball Reference
Medals
Men's basketball
Representing the United States
FIBA U19 World Championship
Silver medal – second place	2007 Serbia	National team

Patrick Beverley (born July 12, 1988) is an American professional basketball player for Boulazac Basket Dordogne of the LNB Élite. Originally from Chicago's West Side, Beverley played college basketball for the Arkansas Razorbacks. He spent the first five years of his pro career overseas, playing in Ukraine, Greece, and Russia. In January 2013, he signed with the Houston Rockets of the National Basketball Association (NBA).

After four and a half seasons with the Rockets, he was traded to the Los Angeles Clippers in a package for Chris Paul in 2017. Beverley spent four seasons with the Clippers, culminating in the first Conference Finals appearance in franchise history. He has also played for the Minnesota Timberwolves, Los Angeles Lakers, Chicago Bulls, Philadelphia 76ers, and Milwaukee Bucks. Beverley is a three-time NBA All-Defensive Team member, known for his physicality. He has been involved in a number of publicized on-court incidents.

== High school career ==
Beverley was raised in West Garfield Park on the West Side of Chicago, Illinois. He attended Waubonsie Valley High School in a suburb of Chicago as a freshman, before transferring to John Marshall Metropolitan High School on Chicago's West Side. As a senior at John Marshall, he led the state in scoring with 37.3 points per game and was named Co-Player of the Year. Beverley was also selected to play in the Roundball Classic on April 8, 2006, a national high school All-Star Game held at Chicago's United Center.

== College career ==
As a freshman playing for the Arkansas Razorbacks in 2006–07, Beverley averaged 13.9 points, 4.5 rebounds, 3.1 assists, and 1.7 steals (6th in the SEC) per contest, with a free throw percentage of .812 (3rd). He was named the Southeastern Conference (SEC) Newcomer of the Year by the Associated Press and the SEC Freshman of the Year by the league's coaches. He earned SEC All-Freshman Team honors and second-team All-SEC honors.

As a sophomore in 2007–08, Beverley started in 33 of 35 contests and led the Razorbacks in rebounds (6.6 rpg), steals (1.3 spg), and 3-point percentage (.378), and was second in points (12.1 ppg) and third in assists (2.4 apg). For his performance in the 2007–08 campaign, Beverley was a candidate for the Wooden Award as well as Naismith Award.

In August 2008, Beverley was deemed ineligible to play in the 2008–09 season due to academic issues. Denying speculation that insufficient grades were to blame, Beverley admitted that he had been suspended because of an academic integrity issue on a class paper. Instead of waiting out his suspension, Beverley hired an agent and decided to hone his skills for professional basketball in Europe. Although originally denying it he eventually owned up to it saying "Someone did a paper for me. I turned in a paper that wasn't mine. I accepted full punishment for it. That's over. I served my punishment — going overseas."

== Professional career ==
=== BC Dnipro (2008–2009) ===
In October 2008, at the age of 20, Beverley signed a one-year contract for "just over six figures" with the Ukrainian team Dnipro; the contract had no buyout, and Beverley was free to leave at season's end without penalty. He participated in the Ukrainian Basketball League (UBL) All-Star Game and won the league's Slam Dunk Contest. In 46 games for Dnipro, Beverley averaged 16.7 points, 7 rebounds, 3.6 assists, 2.2 steals, and 1.3 blocks.

=== Olympiacos Piraeus (2009–2010) ===
Beverley was automatically entered into the 2009 NBA draft, where he was selected with the 42nd overall pick by the Los Angeles Lakers. On June 26, 2009, a day after the draft, the Miami Heat announced that they had acquired the draft rights to Beverley from the Lakers in exchange for a 2011 second-round draft pick and cash considerations. He was later cut as a part of the final roster cuts.

On August 26, 2009, Beverley signed with the Greek team Olympiacos Piraeus. He helped Olympiacos win the 2010 Greek Cup title and reach the finals of both the EuroLeague and the Greek League. In 19 EuroLeague games, he averaged 2.7 points and 1.9 rebounds. He also appeared in 22 Greek League games and averaged 4.9 points, 2.8 rebounds, and 1.6 assists.

=== Spartak St. Petersburg (2011–2012) ===
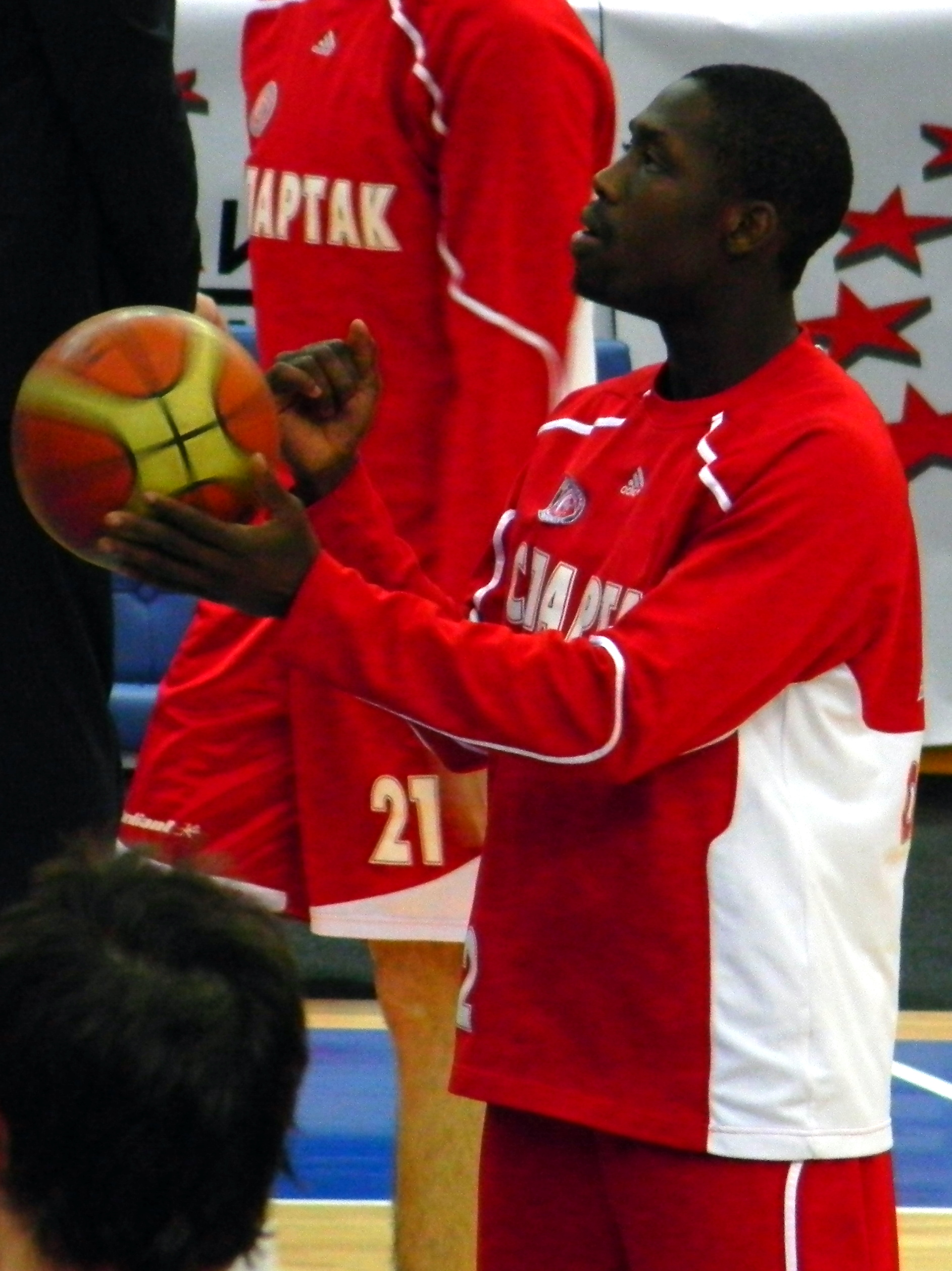
Beverley with Spartak in March 2011

On January 9, 2011, Beverley signed with Spartak St. Petersburg for the rest of the 2010–11 season. On November 10, 2011, he signed a contract extension with Spartak. The new deal locked Beverley in with the team through 2014 and included an option for the 2014–15 season. On January 28, 2012, Beverley scored a professional career-high 38 points to go along with 7 rebounds and 5 assists in a 2OT loss to the Spartak Primorye.

On April 6, 2012, Beverley was selected as the EuroCup MVP for the 2011–12 season. He dominated throughout the season as he led his team to a spot in the EuroCup semifinals. He was the team leader in scoring, steals, and performance index rating, and second in rebounds, assists, and three-pointers made; the team led the competition in points against per game and finished with a 13–3 record. His 1.9 steals per game led the EuroCup, he was second in index rating, and at just 1.85 meters, Beverley was the shortest player in the competition to average more than four rebounds per game.

On July 19, 2012, Beverley announced that he would not be returning to Spartak for the 2012–13 season, but Spartak insisted that he honor his contract—he could only void his contract if he received an NBA offer. He continued on with Spartak in 2012–13, but left the team on December 23 after reaching an agreement with the Houston Rockets.

=== Houston Rockets (2013–2017) ===
On January 7, 2013, Beverley signed a 3-year, $1.985 million contract with the Rockets and was assigned to the Rio Grande Valley Vipers of the NBA Development League. He spent a week with the Vipers before making his NBA debut on January 15, 2013, in a 117–109 loss to the Los Angeles Clippers. In just under two minutes off the bench, he recorded three points, one assist, and one steal. On February 23, 2013, he made three 3-pointers and scored a career-high 15 points in a 105–103 loss to the Washington Wizards. In his first season with Houston, he averaged 5.6 points, 2.7 rebounds, 2.9 assists, and 0.90 steals in 41 games. In Game 2 of the Rockets' first-round playoff series against the Oklahoma City Thunder, Beverley had his first career start and recorded 16 points, 12 rebounds, six assists, two steals, and one block. He had another 16-point effort in Game 4 to help the Rockets avoid elimination with a 105–103 win, but they lost the series in six games.

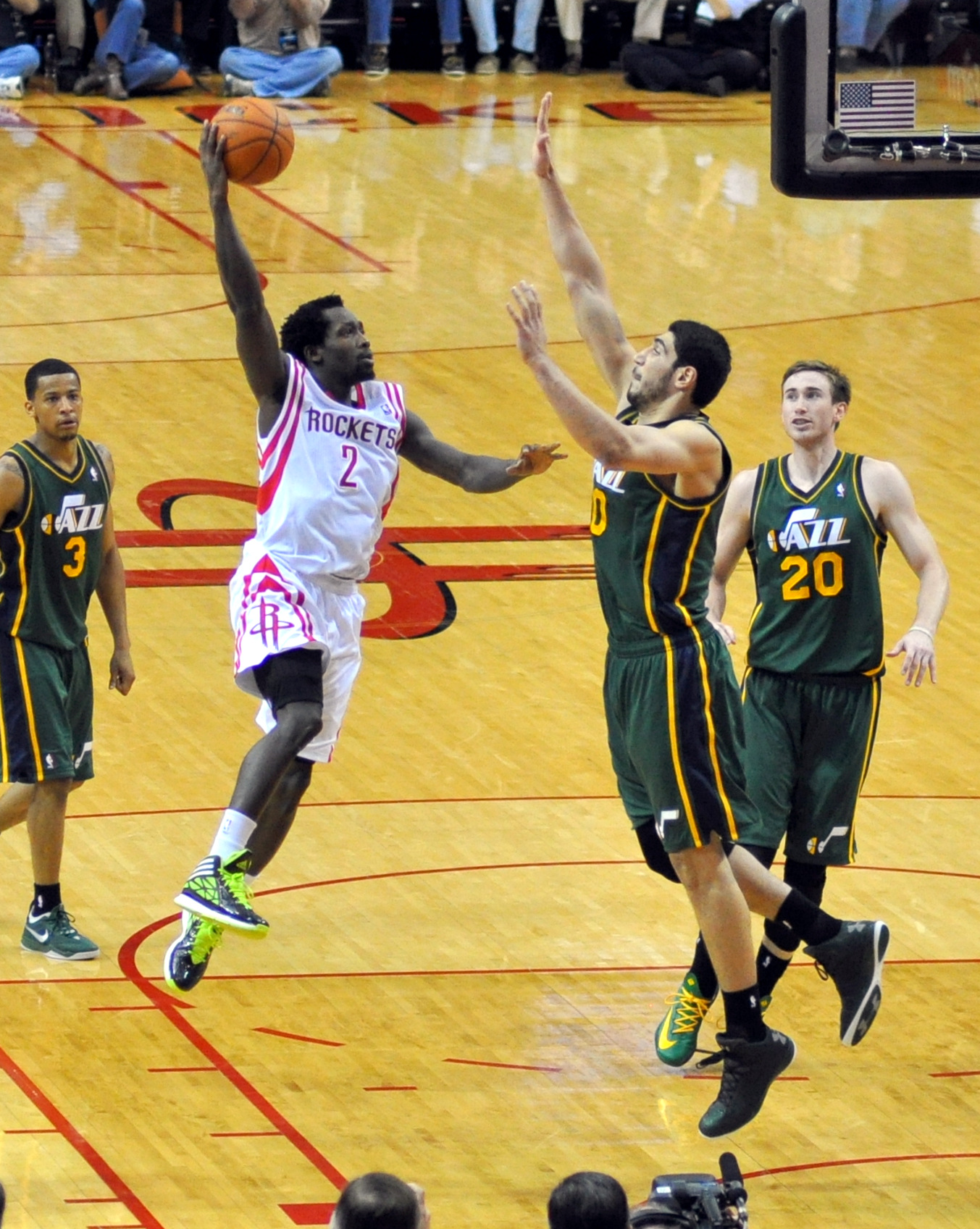
Beverley with the Rockets in March 2014, going up for a shot against Enes Kanter

Beverley had an injury-plagued season in 2013–14; he played 56 out of 82 games. He was placed on the inactive list for 14 games following surgery on December 23 to repair a fracture in his right hand. On February 23, he had his first career 20-point outing in a 115–112 win over the Phoenix Suns. He tied that mark in the third-last game of the season, scoring 20 points in a 111–104 win over the New Orleans Pelicans on April 12. He was named in the NBA All-Defensive Second Team for the 2013–14 season.

On February 14, 2015, Beverley came from behind in the semifinal and final rounds to win the Skills Challenge during NBA All-Star Weekend. On March 30 he was ruled out for the rest of the season with a left wrist injury.

On July 9, 2015, Beverley re-signed with the Rockets on a four-year, $23 million deal. He was selected to compete in the 2016 Skills Challenge to defend his title, but an ankle injury forced him to withdraw. On March 18, 2016, he recorded a then season-high 18 points and a career-high 10 assists in a 116–111 win over the Minnesota Timberwolves. On March 31, he scored a career-high 22 points in a 103–100 loss to the Chicago Bulls.

On October 22, 2016, Beverley was ruled out for three weeks after requiring arthroscopic surgery on his left knee. He made his season debut on November 17, 2016, after missing the first 11 games. Limited to 25 minutes, Beverley had 11 points, three assists, and three blocks in a 126–109 win over the Portland Trail Blazers. On December 7, 2016, he came three rebounds shy of his first career triple-double, finishing with 10 points, seven rebounds and tying a career high with 12 assists in a 134–95 win over the Los Angeles Lakers. He came close again on December 21, recording a season-high 18 points, nine assists, and nine rebounds in a 125–111 win over the Phoenix Suns. On April 2, 2017, he scored a career-high 26 points in a 123–116 win over the Phoenix Suns. On April 16 he had a playoff career-best 21 points along with 10 rebounds in a 118–87 win over the Oklahoma City Thunder in Game 1 of their first-round playoff series. At the season's end, Beverley was named to the NBA All-Defensive First Team, becoming the fourth player in franchise history to earn All-Defensive First Team honors and the first since Scottie Pippen in 1998–99. He also won the NBA Hustle Award.

=== Los Angeles Clippers (2017–2021) ===
On June 28, 2017, the Los Angeles Clippers acquired Beverley, Sam Dekker, Montrezl Harrell, Darrun Hilliard, DeAndre Liggins, Lou Williams, Kyle Wiltjer and a 2018 first-round pick from the Houston Rockets in exchange for Chris Paul. In his debut for the Clippers in their season opener on October 19, 2017, Beverley scored 10 points in a 108–92 win over the Los Angeles Lakers. After dealing with right knee soreness throughout the preseason, Beverley missed five games in mid-November with a sore right knee. On November 22, 2017, he was ruled out for the rest of the season after undergoing an arthroscopic lateral meniscus repair, and a microfracture procedure, on his right knee.

On January 27, 2019, Beverley had 16 points, 10 rebounds, and eight assists in a 122–108 win over the Sacramento Kings. In the first round of the playoffs against the Golden State Warriors, he had two 14-rebound efforts.

On July 12, 2019, Beverley re-signed with the Clippers to a three-year deal.

On July 3, 2021, Beverley was suspended for one game for pushing Chris Paul during Game 6 of the Western Conference Finals of the playoffs against the Phoenix Suns. The Clippers lost the game, ending their season. Beverley's suspension made him the first player to be suspended for the first game of the following season since Andrew Bynum in the 2011 NBA playoffs for shoving and elbowing J. J. Barea during the Los Angeles Lakers' four-game sweep by the eventual NBA champions, the Dallas Mavericks.

=== Minnesota Timberwolves (2021–2022) ===
On August 16, 2021, Beverley was traded, alongside Daniel Oturu and Rajon Rondo, to the Memphis Grizzlies in exchange for Eric Bledsoe. On August 25, the Grizzlies traded Beverley to the Minnesota Timberwolves in exchange for Jarrett Culver and Juancho Hernangómez. On October 23, he made his Timberwolves debut, recording five points, three rebounds, and six assists in a 96–89 win over the New Orleans Pelicans. On January 3, 2022, he recorded a career-high tying 12 assists, alongside 11 points, three rebounds and two steals, in a 122–104 win over the Los Angeles Clippers. Two days later, he scored a season-high 20 points, alongside four rebounds and six assists, in a 98–90 win over the Oklahoma City Thunder. On February 16, Beverley signed a one-year, $13 million contract extension with the Timberwolves. On March 14, he scored 20 points, alongside four rebounds and eight assists, in a 149–139 win over the San Antonio Spurs.

After a play-in tournament win over the Los Angeles Clippers, Beverley was notably recognized for his emphatic celebration. Beverley recorded seven points, 11 rebounds, and three assists, the Timberwolves qualified for the playoffs for the first time since 2018 and faced the Memphis Grizzlies during their first-round series. On April 23, Beverley recorded 17 points, five rebounds, and two blocks in a 119–118 Game 4 win. The Timberwolves ended up losing the series in six games, with Beverley averaging 11 points and 4.8 assists per game.

=== Los Angeles Lakers (2022–2023) ===
On July 6, 2022, Beverley was traded, along with Malik Beasley, Jarred Vanderbilt, Leandro Bolmaro, the draft rights to Walker Kessler, four future first-round picks, and a pick swap, to the Utah Jazz in exchange for Rudy Gobert. On August 25, he was traded to the Los Angeles Lakers in exchange for Stanley Johnson and Talen Horton-Tucker. On October 18, Beverley made his Lakers debut, putting up three points in a 123–109 loss to the Golden State Warriors. On November 24, he was suspended for three games after shoving Deandre Ayton of the Phoenix Suns from behind during an on-court altercation.

On February 9, 2023, Beverley was traded to the Orlando Magic in a four-team trade involving the Los Angeles Clippers and Denver Nuggets. He and the Magic agreed to a contract buyout three days later, and he was subsequently waived.

=== Chicago Bulls (2023) ===
On February 21, 2023, Beverley signed with his hometown team, the Chicago Bulls, deciding between them and the defending champion Golden State Warriors. In his Bulls debut, he contributed eight points, five rebounds and four assists in a 131–87 victory over the Brooklyn Nets.

=== Philadelphia 76ers (2023–2024) ===
On July 9, 2023, Beverley signed with the Philadelphia 76ers. On December 1, 2023, he tied a career-high with 26 points, along with eight rebounds, seven assists, and two steals in a 125–116 loss to the Boston Celtics. On January 27, 2024, Beverley put up 17 points and a season-high 11 assists in a 111–105 loss to the Denver Nuggets.

=== Milwaukee Bucks (2024) ===
On February 8, 2024, Beverley was traded to the Milwaukee Bucks in exchange for Cameron Payne and a 2027 second-round pick. On April 9, Beverley scored a team-leading 20 points and recorded 10 rebounds, during a 104–91 win over the Boston Celtics.

On May 2, during a Game 6 loss to the Indiana Pacers that eliminated the Bucks from the playoffs, Beverley twice threw a basketball at fans seated behind the Bucks' bench during an apparent argument. In the post-game interview, Beverley refused to answer a question from ESPN reporter Malinda Adams due to her not being subscribed to his podcast, which Beverley faced backlash for. Media outlets erroneously reported that he was banned from any further guest appearances on ESPN, but ESPN clarified that Beverley was not banned. Beverley later apologized to Adams privately. On May 9, the NBA announced a four-game suspension for Beverley for his actions during and after the game.

=== Hapoel Tel Aviv (2024–2025) ===
On July 16, 2024, Beverley signed with Hapoel Tel Aviv of the Israeli Basketball Premier League.

In February 2025, following a loss in the Israeli Championship, the team announced Beverley had been suspended. On February 13, 2025, Beverley parted ways with Tel Aviv.

=== PAOK (2025–2026) ===
On December 19, 2025, Beverley signed with PAOK for the remainder of the 2025–26 season, returning to Greek basketball for the first time since his 2009–10 spell with Olympiacos. His arrival added considerable experience to PAOK's backcourt, following an 11-year NBA career in which he appeared in more than 700 games.

Beverley made his debut the following day in a 106–88 home victory over Panionios. After the game, he described PAOK as an ideal environment for him and praised the atmosphere created by the club's supporters.

During the second half of the season, Beverley became an important veteran presence in PAOK's rotation and contributed to the club's run to the 2025–26 FIBA Europe Cup Final. In nine games in the competition, he averaged 9.3 points, 4.0 rebounds, 3.3 assists and 1.2 steals per game. He produced one of his best performances of the season in the second leg of the quarter-finals against Peristeri, recording 19 points, four steals and two blocks as PAOK secured qualification for the semi-finals on aggregate.

In the first leg of the FIBA Europe Cup Final against Bilbao Basket, Beverley scored 24 points, including five three-pointers, while adding seven rebounds, four assists and two steals, helping PAOK to a 79–73 victory in Thessaloniki. PAOK ultimately finished as runners-up after losing the return leg in Bilbao.

Beverley also featured prominently during PAOK's domestic playoff run, helping the club eliminate Peristeri and reach the 2025–26 Greek Basket League semi-finals. In the opening semi-final against Panathinaikos, he recorded 17 points and a career-high 13 assists, setting a PAOK playoff record for assists in a single game and surpassing the previous mark of 12 set by Nikos Boudouris in 1997. PAOK narrowly lost the game in overtime, 114–102. In the second game, Beverley recorded another double-double with 14 points and 11 assists, as PAOK's season came to an end following a 102–94 defeat.

=== Boulazac (2026–present) ===
On August 14, 2026, Beverley signed with Boulazac Basket Dordogne of the French LNB Élite for the 2026–27 season.

== Career statistics ==
Legend
GP	Games played	GS	Games started	MPG	Minutes per game
FG%	Field goal percentage	3P%	3-point field goal percentage	FT%	Free throw percentage
RPG	Rebounds per game	APG	Assists per game	SPG	Steals per game
BPG	Blocks per game	PPG	Points per game	**Bold**	Career high

=== NBA ===
==== Regular season ====
Year	Team	GP	GS	MPG	FG%	3P%	FT%	RPG	APG	SPG	BPG	PPG
2012–13	Houston	41	0	17.4	.418	.375	.829	2.7	2.9	.9	.5	5.6
2013–14	Houston	56	55	**31.3**	.414	.361	.814	3.5	2.7	1.4	.4	10.2
2014–15	Houston	56	55	30.8	.383	.356	.750	4.2	3.4	1.1	.4	10.1
2015–16	Houston	71	63	28.7	**.434**	**.400**	.682	3.5	3.4	1.3	.4	9.9
2016–17	Houston	67	**67**	30.7	.420	.383	.768	**5.9**	4.2	1.5	.4	9.5
2017–18	L.A. Clippers	11	11	30.3	.403	**.400**	.824	4.1	2.9	**1.7**	.5	**12.2**
2018–19	L.A. Clippers	**78**	49	27.4	.407	.397	.780	5.0	3.8	.9	.6	7.6
2019–20	L.A. Clippers	51	50	26.3	.431	.388	.660	5.2	3.6	1.1	.5	7.9
2020–21	L.A. Clippers	37	34	22.5	.423	.397	.800	3.2	2.1	.8	.8	7.5
2021–22	Minnesota	58	54	25.4	.406	.343	.722	4.1	**4.6**	1.2	**.9**	9.2
2022–23	L.A. Lakers	45	45	26.9	.402	.348	.780	3.1	2.6	.9	.6	6.4
2022–23	Chicago	22	22	27.5	.395	.309	.533	4.9	3.5	1.0	.7	5.8
2023–24	Philadelphia	47	5	19.6	.432	.321	.810	3.1	3.1	.5	.4	6.3
2023–24	Milwaukee	26	8	20.9	.391	.361	**.852**	3.6	2.6	.7	.5	6.0
Career		666	518	26.6	.413	.371	.760	4.1	3.4	1.1	.5	8.3

==== Playoffs ====
Year	Team	GP	GS	MPG	FG%	3P%	FT%	RPG	APG	SPG	BPG	PPG
2013	Houston	6	5	33.3	.431	.333	**1.000**	5.5	2.8	1.2	.7	**11.8**
2014	Houston	6	6	33.7	.380	.318	.700	4.2	1.8	.5	.3	8.7
2016	Houston	5	5	25.7	.270	.214	**1.000**	4.4	2.2	.4	.4	5.8
2017	Houston	11	**11**	29.5	.413	.404	.786	5.5	4.2	**1.5**	.2	11.1
2019	L.A. Clippers	6	6	32.4	.426	**.433**	.750	**8.0**	4.7	1.0	1.0	9.8
2020	L.A. Clippers	8	8	20.8	**.513**	.364	.500	4.1	2.4	1.0	.4	6.3
2021	L.A. Clippers	**17**	7	19.0	.426	.351	.857	2.4	1.4	.7	.7	4.9
2022	Minnesota	6	6	32.3	.429	.346	.682	3.2	4.8	1.2	**1.3**	11.0
2024	Milwaukee	6	6	**34.9**	.410	.364	.867	3.3	**5.5**	1.0	.7	8.2
Career		71	60	27.4	.414	.361	.790	4.3	2.9	.9	.6	8.2

=== EuroLeague ===
Year	Team	GP	GS	MPG	FG%	3P%	FT%	RPG	APG	SPG	BPG	PPG	PIR
2009–10	Olympiacos	19	5	9.3	.514	.182	.824	1.9	.6	.6	.2	2.7	4.4
Career		19	5	9.3	.514	.182	.824	1.9	.6	.6	.2	2.7	4.4

=== College ===
Year	Team	GP	GS	MPG	FG%	3P%	FT%	RPG	APG	SPG	BPG	PPG
2006–07	Arkansas	**35**	**34**	**34.4**	**.427**	**.386**	**.812**	4.5	**3.1**	**1.7**	.4	**13.9**
2007–08	Arkansas	**35**	33	33.8	.412	.378	.644	**6.6**	2.4	1.3	**.5**	12.1
Career		70	67	34.1	.420	.382	.730	5.5	2.8	1.5	.4	13.0

== Personal life ==
Beverley has a son and daughter. On May 7, 2017, Beverley's grandfather died hours before Game 4 of the Western Conference semifinals against the San Antonio Spurs.

In 2005, Beverley featured in the 6-part documentary Nike Battlegrounds, representing team Chicago in a loss against team New York.

In 2007, Beverley featured in the documentary film Hoop Reality, the unofficial sequel to 1994's Hoop Dreams.

In 2022, Beverley started The Pat Bev Podcast with co-host Rone (Adam Ferrone), which is part of the Barstool Sports network. In late 2025, Jason Williams joined Barstool and teams up with Beverley and Rone on the new Hoopin' N Hollerin' podcast. Beverley was removed from the podcast in November 2025 after news of Beverley's legal situation came to light involving his sister. He is currently suspended from Barstool until his legal situation is resolved in a satisfactory manner.

In November 2025, Beverly was arrested after allegedly assaulting his sister.
