= Jarred Vanderbilt =

American basketball player (born 1999)

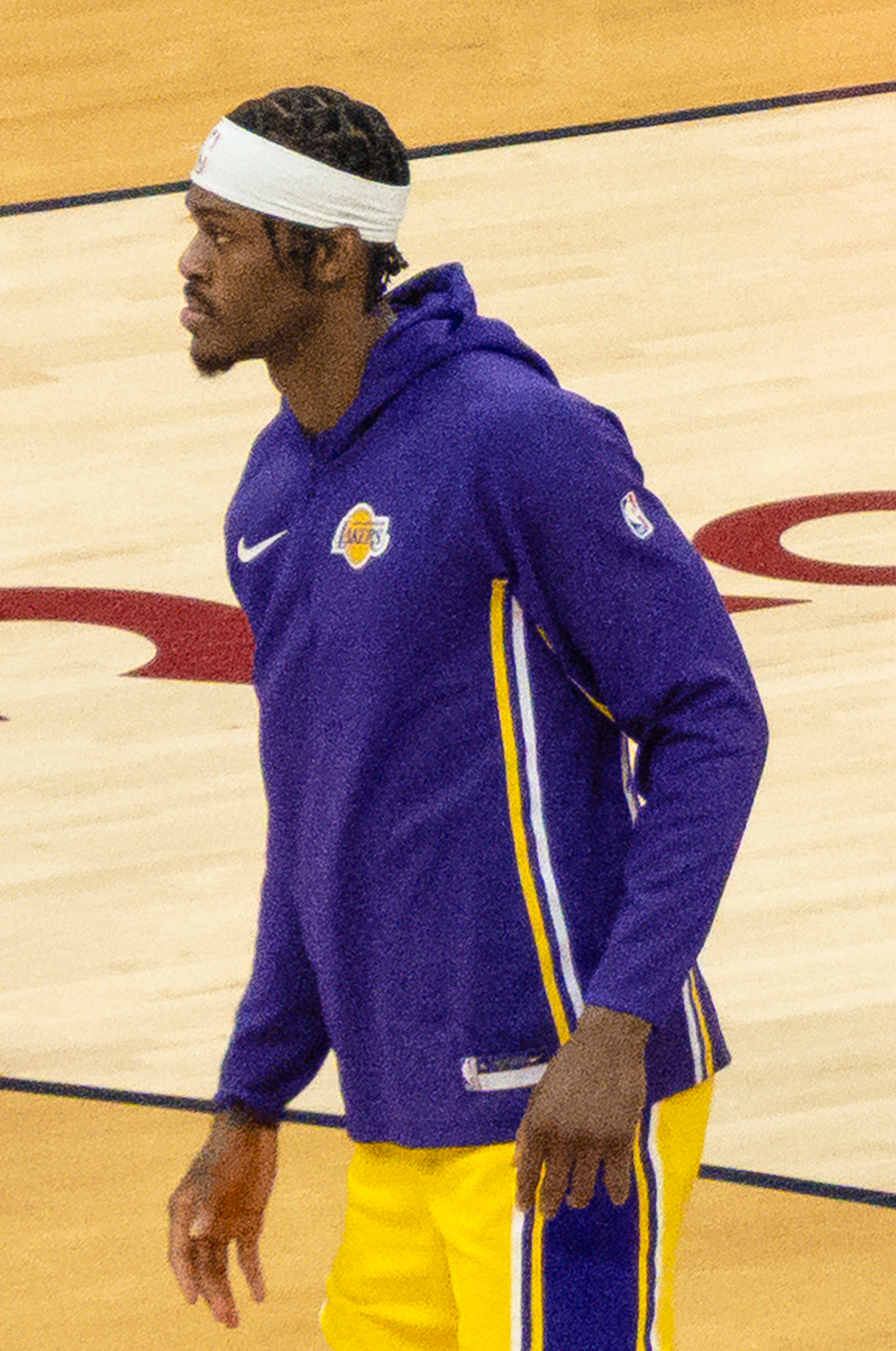
- Vanderbilt with the Los Angeles Lakers in 2026

No. 2 – Los Angeles Lakers
- Position: Power forward
- League: NBA

Personal information
- Born: April 3, 1999 (age 27) Houston, Texas, U.S.
- Listed height: 6 ft 8 in (2.03 m)
- Listed weight: 214 lb (97 kg)

Career information
- High school: Victory Prep (Houston, Texas)
- College: Kentucky (2017–2018)
- NBA draft: 2018: 2nd round, 41st overall pick
- Drafted by: Orlando Magic
- Playing career: 2018–present

Career history
- 2018–2020: Denver Nuggets
- 2019: →Delaware Blue Coats
- 2020: →Rio Grande Valley Vipers
- 2020: →Windy City Bulls
- 2020: →Iowa Wolves
- 2020–2022: Minnesota Timberwolves
- 2022–2023: Utah Jazz
- 2023–present: Los Angeles Lakers

Career highlights
- NBA Cup champion (2023); McDonald's All-American (2017)
- Stats at NBA.com
- Stats at Basketball Reference
Medals
Men's basketball
Representing the United States
FIBA Americas U16 Championship
Gold medal – first place	2015 Argentina	National team

Jarred Jakobi Vanderbilt (born April 3, 1999) is an American professional basketball player for the Los Angeles Lakers of the National Basketball Association (NBA). He was selected as a McDonald's All-American in high school. Vanderbilt played college basketball for the Kentucky Wildcats. He was selected by the Denver Nuggets in the second round of the 2018 NBA draft.

== Early life ==
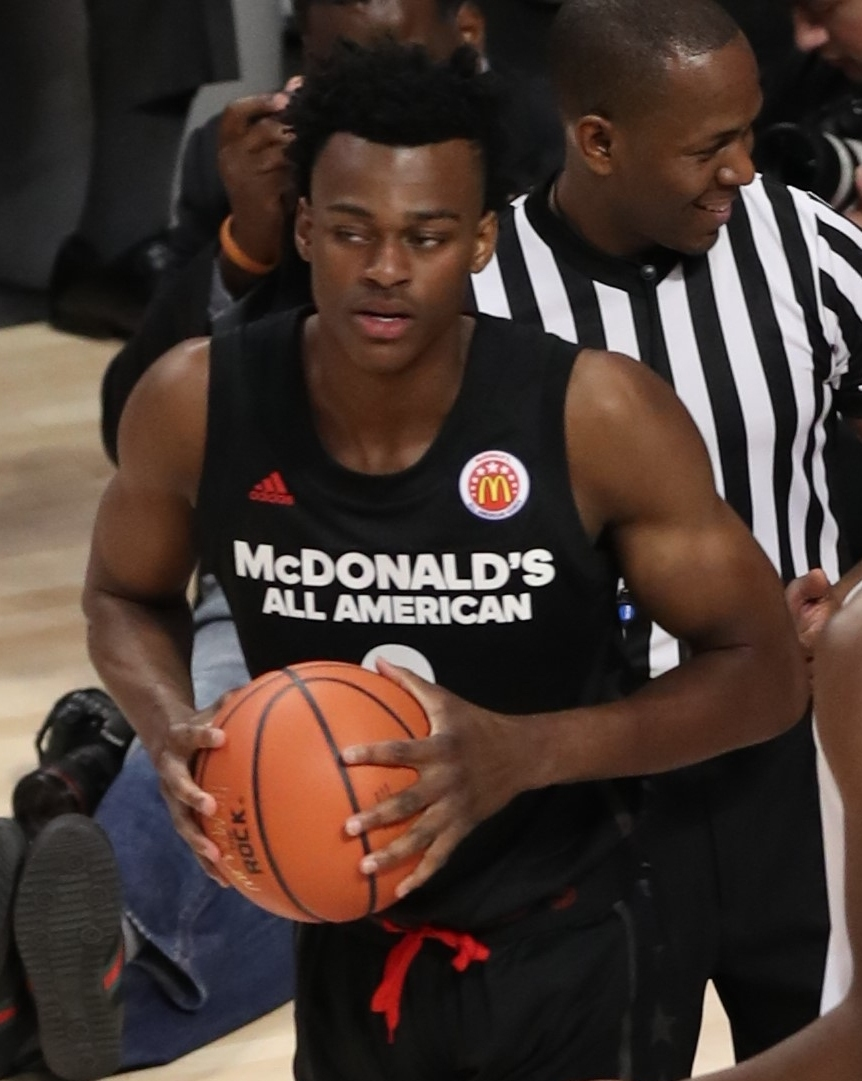
Vanderbilt at the 2017 McDonald's All-American Game

Vanderbilt was born in Houston, Texas. He is the son of Gwendolyn and Robert Vanderbilt. He has two older brothers, Jamal and Robert, and three older sisters, Rean, Jenae, and Tasha. His father played basketball at Wiley College. His mother played at Xavier of Louisiana. His brother, Jamal, played at Texas-Tyler and sister, Jenae, played at UTSA.

Vanderbilt attended Victory Prep Academy in Houston, Texas. As a senior, he averaged 28.5 points, 13.4 rebounds and 8.8 assists per game.

Vanderbilt was considered one of the best players in the 2017 recruiting class by Scout.com, Rivals.com and ESPN. On December 23, 2016, Vanderbilt committed to the Kentucky Wildcats.

College recruiting
Name	Hometown	School	Height	Weight	Commit date
Jarred Vanderbilt; SF	Houston, TX	Victory Prep (TX)	6 ft 8 in (2.03 m)	215 lb (98 kg)	Dec 23, 2016
Jarred Vanderbilt; SF	Recruit ratings: Scout: Rivals: 247Sports: ESPN: (94)				
Overall recruit ranking: Scout: #11 Rivals: #13 247Sports: #8 ESPN: #18
Note: In many cases, Scout, Rivals, 247Sports, On3, and ESPN may conflict in their listings of height and weight.; In these cases, the average was taken. ESPN grades are on a 100-point scale.; Sources: "Kentucky 2017 Basketball Commitments". Rivals.; "2017 Kentucky Basketball Commits". Scout.; "Scout.com Team Recruiting Rankings". Scout.; "2017 Team Ranking". Rivals.; "2017 Kentucky 24/7 Sports Commits". 247Sports.

== College career ==
Despite being highly regarded coming out of high school, two injuries marred Vanderbilt's college career and he only played 14 games for the Kentucky Wildcats. He averaged 5.9 points and 7.9 rebounds in 17.0 minutes per game. Following the season he declared for the 2018 NBA draft.

== Professional career ==
=== Denver Nuggets (2018–2020) ===
On June 21, 2018, Vanderbilt was drafted by the Orlando Magic with the 41st overall pick in the 2018 NBA draft. He was subsequently traded to the Denver Nuggets. On July 11, 2018, Vanderbilt signed with the Denver Nuggets. Vanderbilt made his NBA debut on January 25, 2019, in a 132–95 win over the Phoenix Suns, playing four minutes and scoring one point with three rebounds, an assist, and one steal. On November 20, 2019, Vanderbilt was assigned to the Rio Grande Valley Vipers.

=== Minnesota Timberwolves (2020–2022) ===
On February 5, 2020, Vanderbilt was traded to the Minnesota Timberwolves. Vanderbilt made his 2020 debut on December 27, 2020, in a 127–91 loss to the Los Angeles Lakers, playing 15 minutes and scoring two points, seven rebounds, six assists, three steals, and a block. On January 23, 2021, Vanderbilt scored a career-high 16 points along with 11 rebounds in a win against the New Orleans Pelicans.

On September 15, 2021, Vanderbilt re-signed with the Timberwolves. He started 67 games for the Timberwolves during the 2021–22 season, averaging career-highs of 6.9 points, 8.4 rebounds, and 1.3 steals per game. On April 12, 2022, Vanderbilt grabbed 10 rebounds and scored 3 points during Minnesota's 109–104 play-in game victory over the Los Angeles Clippers.

=== Utah Jazz (2022–2023) ===
On July 6, 2022, Vanderbilt was traded, alongside Malik Beasley, Patrick Beverley, Leandro Bolmaro, the draft rights to Walker Kessler, four future first-round picks, and a pick swap, to the Utah Jazz in exchange for Rudy Gobert. Vanderbilt made 52 appearances (including 41 starts) for the Jazz during the 2022–23 NBA season, recording averages of 8.3 points, 7.9 rebounds, and 2.7 assists.

=== Los Angeles Lakers (2023–present) ===
On February 9, 2023, Vanderbilt was traded to the Los Angeles Lakers in a three-team trade involving the Minnesota Timberwolves. He made his Lakers debut two days later, recording 12 points, eight rebounds and four assists in a 109–103 win over the Golden State Warriors. Vanderbilt logged 26 appearances (24 starts) down the stretch for the Lakers, averaging 7.2 points, 6.7 rebounds, and 1.6 assists.

On September 18, 2023, Vanderbilt agreed to a four-year, $48 million contract extension with the Lakers. The deal was fully guaranteed with a player option in the fourth year. On December 9, Vanderbilt and the Lakers won the inaugural season of the NBA In-Season Tournament, beating the Indiana Pacers 123-109. He logged 16 minutes in the game. Vanderbilt made 29 appearances (six starts) for the Lakers in the 2023–24 season, averaging 5.2 points, 4.8 rebounds, and 1.2 assists.

Vanderbilt made 36 appearances (including two starts) for Los Angeles during the 2024–25 season, recording averages of 4.1 points, 5.1 rebounds, and 1.1 assists. He played in 65 games (including three starts) for the team in the 2025–26 season, averaging 4.4 points, 4.5 rebounds, and 1.3 assists. The Lakers would go on to make the Western Conference semifinals against the Oklahoma City Thunder. In Game 1, Vanderbilt suffered a full dislocation of his right pinky, while attempting to block a dunk by Chet Holmgren — an injury which visibly exposed the bone and ultimately required stitches.

== National team career ==
He won a gold medal with the 2015 USA U16 National Team at the 2015 FIBA Americas Under-16 Championship. He scored 19 points in 19 minutes of play at the 2017 Nike Hoop Summit, as Team USA defeated the World Select Team 98–87.

== Career statistics ==
Legend
GP	Games played	GS	Games started	MPG	Minutes per game
FG%	Field goal percentage	3P%	3-point field goal percentage	FT%	Free throw percentage
RPG	Rebounds per game	APG	Assists per game	SPG	Steals per game
BPG	Blocks per game	PPG	Points per game	**Bold**	Career high

=== NBA ===
==== Regular season ====
Year	Team	GP	GS	MPG	FG%	3P%	FT%	RPG	APG	SPG	BPG	PPG
2018–19	Denver	17	0	4.1	.474	.000	.600	1.4	.2	.4	.1	1.4
2019–20	Denver	9	0	4.6	**.714**	—	—	.9	.2	.3	.1	1.1
2019–20	Minnesota	2	0	2.6	.000	.000	**1.000**	.5	.0	.0	.0	1.0
2020–21	Minnesota	64	30	17.8	.606	.200	.559	5.8	1.2	1.0	**.7**	5.4
2021–22	Minnesota	**74**	**67**	**25.4**	.587	.143	.656	**8.4**	1.3	**1.3**	.6	6.9
2022–23	Utah	52	41	24.1	.556	**.333**	.657	7.9	**2.7**	1.0	.3	**8.3**
2022–23	L.A. Lakers	26	24	24.1	.529	.303	.784	6.7	1.6	1.2	.2	7.2
2023–24	L.A. Lakers	29	6	20.0	.518	.296	.667	4.8	1.2	1.2	.2	5.2
2024–25	L.A. Lakers	36	2	16.1	.488	.281	.556	5.1	1.1	1.0	.3	4.1
2025–26	L.A. Lakers	65	3	17.4	.471	.293	.589	4.5	1.3	.8	.3	4.4
Career		374	173	19.5	.546	.290	.633	5.9	1.4	1.0	.4	5.6

==== Playoffs ====
Year	Team	GP	GS	MPG	FG%	3P%	FT%	RPG	APG	SPG	BPG	PPG
2019	Denver	3	0	1.7	—	—	—	.3	.0	.0	.3	.0
2022	Minnesota	6	6	**21.5**	**.481**	—	.700	**7.2**	.7	**1.2**	.3	**5.5**
2023	L.A. Lakers	**15**	**13**	16.5	.400	**.241**	.700	3.2	.8	.7	**.8**	4.6
2025	L.A. Lakers	5	0	12.0	.333	.000	**.750**	3.8	**1.0**	.6	.2	1.4
2026	L.A. Lakers	7	0	10.7	.409	.111	.333	3.4	.3	.3	.0	2.9
Career		36	19	14.3	.417	.205	.676	3.8	.6	.6	.4	3.6

=== College ===
Year	Team	GP	GS	MPG	FG%	3P%	FT%	RPG	APG	SPG	BPG	PPG
2017–18	Kentucky	14	0	17.0	.426	.000	.632	7.9	1.0	.4	.8	5.9

== Personal life ==
Vanderbilt has been a vegan since 2020 after initially adopting the diet as a one-month challenge.
