= Malik Beasley =

American basketball player (born 1996)

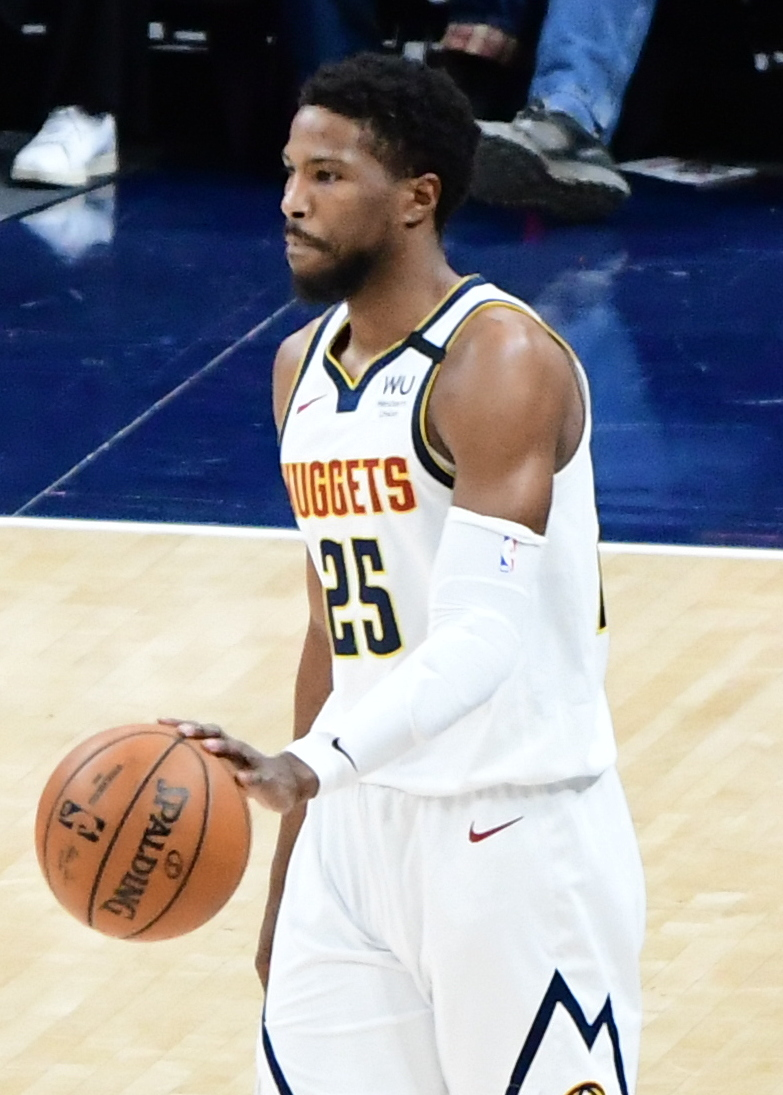
- Beasley with the Denver Nuggets in 2020

Free agent
- Position: Shooting guard

Personal information
- Born: November 26, 1996 (age 29) Atlanta, Georgia, U.S.
- Listed height: 6 ft 4 in (1.93 m)
- Listed weight: 187 lb (85 kg)

Career information
- High school: St. Francis (Alpharetta, Georgia)
- College: Florida State (2015–2016)
- NBA draft: 2016: 1st round, 19th overall pick
- Drafted by: Denver Nuggets
- Playing career: 2016–present

Career history
- 2016–2020: Denver Nuggets
- 2016–2017: →Sioux Falls Skyforce
- 2020–2022: Minnesota Timberwolves
- 2022–2023: Utah Jazz
- 2023: Los Angeles Lakers
- 2023–2024: Milwaukee Bucks
- 2024–2025: Detroit Pistons
- 2026: Santurce Crabbers

Career highlights
- ACC All-Freshman Team (2016)
- Stats at NBA.com
- Stats at Basketball Reference

Malik JonMikal Beasley (/məˈliːk/ mə-LEEK; born November 26, 1996) is an American professional basketball player who last played for the Santurce Crabbers of the Baloncesto Superior Nacional (BSN). He played in the National Basketball Association (NBA) for the Denver Nuggets, Minnesota Timberwolves, Utah Jazz, Los Angeles Lakers, Milwaukee Bucks, and Detroit Pistons.

Beasley attended Saint Francis School in Alpharetta, Georgia, where he was a four-star recruit. He played college basketball for the Florida State Seminoles. Beasley had a standout freshman season at Florida State, earning freshman-team All-Atlantic Coast Conference (ACC) honors after averaging 15.6 points and 5.3 rebounds per game. He led the team in scoring and helped lead the Seminoles to a 20–14 record and berth in the NIT Tournament. Beasley declared for the 2016 NBA draft following this freshman season.

The Nuggets selected Beasley with the 19th overall pick in the 2016 draft. Beasley saw limited minutes off the bench his first two seasons but took on a larger role in his third year, averaging over 11 points in 81 games played. After three and a half seasons with the Nuggets, Beasley was traded to the Timberwolves in February 2020. He had the highest scoring output of his career in his first season and a half with the Timberwolves, averaging 19.9 points over 51 games. He played for four more NBA teams before being accused of illegal sports betting in 2025. On June 29, 2026, Beasley was indicted on sports gambling charges by federal prosecutors at the U.S. Attorney's Office for the Eastern District of New York.

== High school career ==
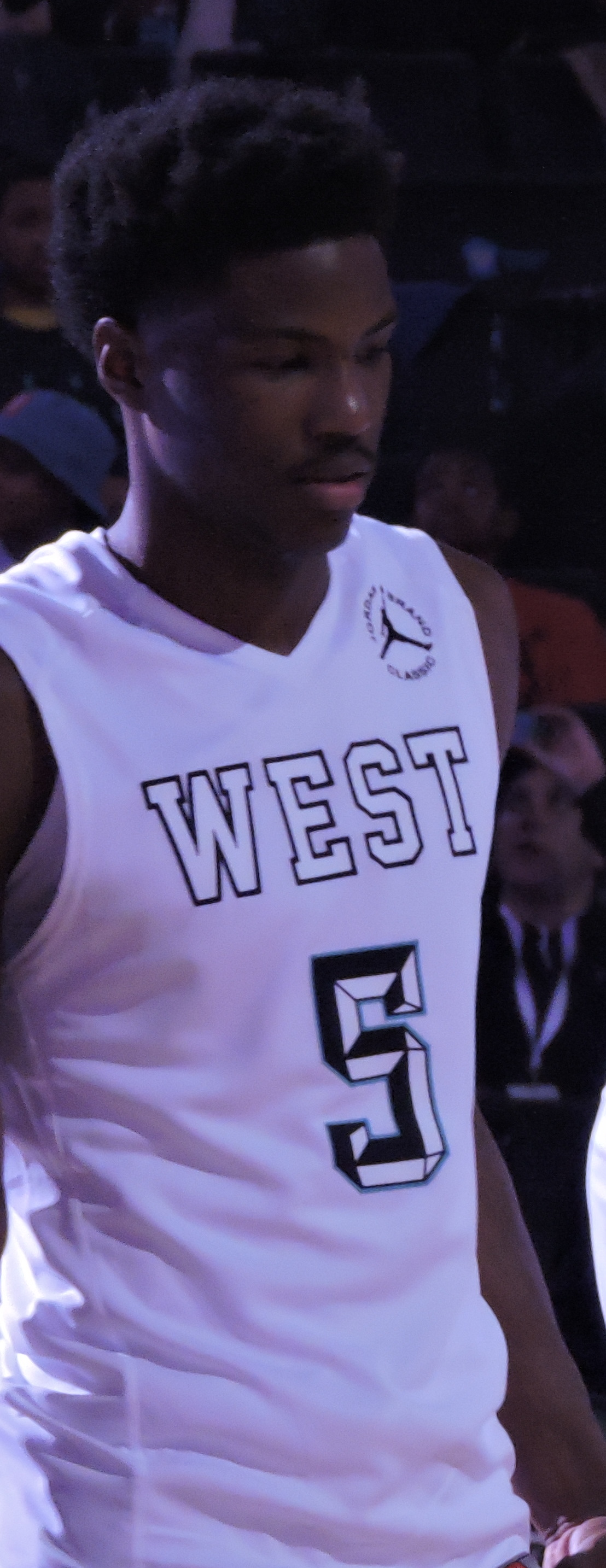
Beasley at the Jordan Brand Classic in 2015

Beasley attended Saint Francis School in Alpharetta, Georgia. As a senior, he averaged 22.2 points, 6.9 rebounds, 2.9 assists, 1.9 steals, and 0.6 blocks, earning the Class 1A Player of the Year of the state of Georgia and an All-State Class A First Team. He attended high school with Kobi Simmons, Kaiser Gates, and Jacob Davis (Birmingham–Southern College football player).

Regarded as a four-star recruit by Rivals.com, Beasley committed to Florida State University over offers from UConn, UCLA, Wake Forest, Oregon, and others.

== College career ==
As a freshman for the Florida State Seminoles in 2015–16, Beasley averaged 15.6 points, 5.3 rebounds, and 1.5 assists in 29.8 minutes per game over 34 games. He was subsequently named to the Atlantic Coast Conference's all-freshman team, and ranked eighth in the conference in free throw percentage (.813) and 10th in field-goal percentage (.471).

On March 21, 2016, Beasley declared for the NBA draft, forgoing his final three years of college eligibility. He was the first player in Florida State's basketball history to leave as a one-and-done prospect.

== Professional career ==
=== Denver Nuggets (2016–2020) ===
Following the conclusion of the 2015–16 season, Beasley had surgery to repair a stress fracture in his right leg. Because of this, he did not participate in pre-draft workouts. Despite having medical concerns entering the 2016 NBA draft, Beasley was selected with the 19th overall pick by the Denver Nuggets. On August 9, 2016, he signed his rookie scale contract with the Nuggets. Beasley appeared in just two of the Nuggets' first seven games of the season, and managed under eight minutes of action and failed to score in those two games. He had a breakthrough game on November 10, 2016, scoring 12 points in 15 minutes off the bench in a 125–101 loss to the Golden State Warriors. During his rookie season, Beasley had multiple assignments with the Sioux Falls Skyforce of the NBA Development League, pursuant to the flexible assignment rule.

On February 1, 2019, Beasley had a career-high 35 points in a win over the Houston Rockets.

=== Minnesota Timberwolves (2020–2022) ===
On February 5, 2020, Beasley was traded to the Minnesota Timberwolves in a four-team, 12-player trade. After the trade to Minnesota, Beasley received the starting job and his scoring output drastically increased. In 14 games with the Timberwolves, he averaged 20.7 points, 5.1 rebounds, and 1.9 assists per game while starting all 14 games.

On November 27, 2020, Beasley re-signed with the Timberwolves on a reported four-year, $60 million contract. On February 25, 2021, Beasley was suspended for 12 games as a result of a guilty plea in a criminal case. At the time of the suspension, he was averaging a career-high 20.5 points per game and shooting 40% from 3-point range. The Timberwolves were a league-worst 7–26.

On March 5, 2022, Beasley broke the Timberwolves franchise record for most three-pointers made in a single season, surpassing Kevin Love's 190. He held the Timberwolves franchise record for most made three-pointers in a season, with 240 until the 2024–2025 regular season in which Anthony Edwards made 320 three-pointers. Four days later, he made a franchise record 11 three-pointers in a 132–102 win over the Oklahoma City Thunder. His 33 points in that game stands as the most points in an NBA game made exclusively from three-point shots.

On April 16, 2022, during Game 1 of the first round of the playoffs, Beasley scored a playoff career-high 23 points in a 130–117 win over the Memphis Grizzlies.

=== Utah Jazz (2022–2023) ===
On July 6, 2022, Beasley was traded, alongside Patrick Beverley, Jarred Vanderbilt, Leandro Bolmaro, the draft rights to Walker Kessler, four future first round picks and a pick swap, to the Utah Jazz in exchange for Rudy Gobert. On October 19, Beasley made his Jazz debut, logging 15 points and five rebounds in a 123–102 win over the Denver Nuggets.

=== Los Angeles Lakers (2023) ===
On February 9, 2023, Beasley was traded to the Los Angeles Lakers in a three-team trade involving the Minnesota Timberwolves. He made his Lakers debut two days later, recording four points and two rebounds in a 109–103 win over the Golden State Warriors.

On June 29, 2023, the Los Angeles Lakers declined Beasley's team option, making him a free agent.

=== Milwaukee Bucks (2023–2024) ===
On July 6, 2023, Beasley signed a minimum deal with the Milwaukee Bucks. On November 16, Beasley scored a season-high 30 points during a 128–112 win over the Toronto Raptors. On February 17, 2024, Beasley participated in the Three-Point Contest during the NBA's all-star weekend, ultimately losing to his Bucks teammate Damian Lillard.

=== Detroit Pistons (2024–2025) ===
On July 11, 2024, Beasley signed a one-year, $6 million contract with the Detroit Pistons. On January 13, 2025, Beasley scored 22 points in a 124–119 win over the New York Knicks. Beasley went 6-of-8 behind the 3-point line, including the last two 3-pointers that won the game for the Pistons. On February 9, Beasley scored a career-high 36 points in a 125–112 victory of the Philadelphia 76ers. On February 11, Beasley set a Pistons franchise record for the most three-pointers made in a season with 212, breaking Saddiq Bey's previous record of 211. Beasley played in all 82 games for Detroit during the 2024–25 NBA season, averaging 16.3 points, 2.6 rebounds, and 1.7 assists.

After Game 2 of round 1 of the playoffs against the New York Knicks, Beasley finished second in voting for Sixth Man of the Year, losing it to Payton Pritchard. Beasley struggled with his efficiency throughout the series against the Knicks after a 20 point game win over them in Game 1. He rebounded in Game 6, scoring 20 points, shooting 6–13 from the field and 2–2 from the free throw line. Despite the effort, the Pistons ended their season in a 113–116 Game 6 loss, with the ball slipping away from Beasley after a pass by Cade Cunningham in an attempt to send the game to overtime with one second remaining.

The Pistons front office was planning to re-sign Beasley in a three-year deal worth $42 million right before Beasley was under federal investigation. He was not re-signed as a free agent after the season.

=== Santurce Crabbers (2026) ===
On February 13, 2026, Beasley signed a deal to play in Puerto Rico for the Bad Bunny-owned Santurce Crabbers. On March 22, 2026, he had his debut against the reigning champions Vaqueros de Bayamón where he scored 21 points and 8 rebounds, winning 78–77. On April 2, 2026, Beasley had 34 points in a close 107–102 win against the Criollos de Caguas. On May 11, 2026, Beasley was released from the team after a slow 6-11 start to the season.

== Personal life ==
His grandfather was actor John Beasley, who played the role of Notre Dame football Coach Warren, welcoming new walk-on players to fall practice, in the film Rudy. On March 26, 2019, Malik and his wife Montana Yao had their first child. They had a second child, a daughter, on November 11, 2022. Beasley had a brief relationship with TV personality Larsa Pippen from 2020 until 2021; after four months apart they shortly dated again in 2021. Yao filed for divorce on March 4, 2025, citing "irreconcilable differences".

== Legal issues ==
On September 27, 2020, Beasley was arrested for marijuana possession, concealing stolen property, and for an incident in which he brandished a firearm. He was initially released from law enforcement custody but later faced charges in Hennepin County stemming from the incident. Beasley pled guilty to the felony charge of making a threat of violence in December 2020 and was sentenced to serve 120 days in jail, with confinement occurring after the conclusion of the 2020–21 NBA season. Beasley served 78 days of the 120-day sentence and was released in August 2021.

On June 29, 2025, the United States Attorneys Office announced that Beasley was under investigation for gambling and placing prop bets on NBA games. Beasley's attorney later said he was no longer a target of the investigation. His attorneys claimed he was no longer a target of the investigation as of August 2025.

On June 29, 2026, federal investigators announced an indictment in the Eastern District of New York against Beasley and former player Ed Davis. Beasley is the fifth current or former NBA player to be indicted by federal prosecutors as part of a wide-reaching investigation into illegal sports gambling in the NBA and insider information trading. Beasley is accused of sports bribery, conspiracy to commit wire fraud, honest services fraud, and conspiracy to commit money laundering.

On October 27, 2026 Beasley's lawyer confirmed that he agreed to plead guilty in his federal sports gambling case. He is scheduled to appear in court on December 9 and change his plea at that time.

== Career statistics ==
Legend
GP	Games played	GS	Games started	MPG	Minutes per game
FG%	Field goal percentage	3P%	3-point field goal percentage	FT%	Free throw percentage
RPG	Rebounds per game	APG	Assists per game	SPG	Steals per game
BPG	Blocks per game	PPG	Points per game	**Bold**	Career high
*	Led the league

=== NBA ===
==== Regular season ====
Year	Team	GP	GS	MPG	FG%	3P%	FT%	RPG	APG	SPG	BPG	PPG
2016–17	Denver	22	1	7.5	.452	.321	.800	.8	.5	.3	.0	3.8
2017–18	Denver	62	0	9.4	.410	.341	.667	1.1	.5	.2	.1	3.2
2018–19	Denver	81	18	23.2	**.474**	.402	.848	2.5	1.2	.7	.1	11.3
2019–20	Denver	41	0	18.2	.389	.360	**.868**	1.9	1.2	.8	.1	7.9
2019–20	Minnesota	14	14	**33.1**	.472	**.426**	.750	**5.1**	1.9	.6	.1	**20.7**
2020–21	Minnesota	37	36	32.8	.440	.399	.850	4.4	**2.4**	.8	**.2**	19.6
2021–22	Minnesota	79	18	25.0	.391	.377	.817	2.9	1.5	.5	**.2**	12.1
2022–23	Utah	55	13	26.8	.396	.359	.841	3.6	1.7	.8	.1	13.4
2022–23	L.A. Lakers	26	14	23.9	.392	.353	.619	3.3	1.2	.8	.0	11.1
2023–24	Milwaukee	79	**77**	29.6	.443	.413	.714	3.7	1.4	.7	.1	11.3
2024–25	Detroit	**82***	18	27.8	.430	.416	.679	2.6	1.7	**.9**	.1	16.3
Career		578	209	23.8	.426	.391	.769	2.8	1.4	.7	.1	11.7

==== Playoffs ====
Year	Team	GP	GS	MPG	FG%	3P%	FT%	RPG	APG	SPG	BPG	PPG
2019	Denver	**14**	0	20.1	.387	.404	.710	**3.4**	1.0	.2	.1	8.1
2022	Minnesota	6	0	19.8	.432	.320	.833	3.3	.7	.3	**.2**	8.5
2023	L.A. Lakers	11	0	8.3	.294	.269	**1.000**	.7	.2	.1	.0	3.0
2024	Milwaukee	6	**2**	21.8	**.512**	**.440**	—	2.5	.7	**.7**	.0	8.8
2025	Detroit	6	0	**27.2**	.373	.339	**1.000**	2.5	**1.2**	.5	**.2**	**14.0**
Career		43	2	18.2	.397	.357	.804	2.5	.7	.3	.1	7.8

=== College ===
Year	Team	GP	GS	MPG	FG%	3P%	FT%	RPG	APG	SPG	BPG	PPG
2015–16	Florida State	34	33	29.8	.471	.387	.813	5.3	1.5	.9	.2	15.6

=== Baloncesto Superior Nacional ===
Year	Team	GP	GS	MPG	FG%	3P%	FT%	RPG	APG	SPG	BPG	PPG
2026	Santurce	17	17	28.1	.387	.303	.822	4.2	1.8	1.2	.1	18.4

== See also ==
- List of NBA single-game 3-point field goal leaders
- List of NBA single-season 3-point scoring leaders
- List of people banned or suspended by the NBA
