= Sachin Gupta (executive) =

National Basketball Association executive

Chief Analytics Officer of Chelsea
- Incumbent
- Assumed office November 2024

Executive Vice President of Basketball Operations of the Minnesota Timberwolves
- In office 2019–2024

Personal details
- Born: March 17, 1982 (age 44) Boston, Massachusetts
- Education: MIT; Stanford Graduate School of Business

Sachin Gupta (born March 17, 1982) is an American professional basketball executive who currently serves as Chief of Analytics at Chelsea Football Club, working alongside the likes of Santiago Alvarez Barbosa and Federico Bettuzzi.

== Early life ==
Gupta earned a degree in electrical engineering and computer science from MIT, as well as an MBA degree from the Stanford Graduate School of Business.

While working for ESPN in 2006, Gupta created the 'NBA Trade Machine' on the network's website, providing users with the opportunity to virtually assume the role of a general manager. The website incorporates current player contracts and integrates the rules of the NBA Collective Bargaining Agreement, accurately assessing whether a trade is possible based on salary cap restrictions and other provisions in the CBA. The inspiration for the website came from Chris Ramsay, the son of Jack Ramsay.

== Executive career ==
Gupta started his career as a special advisor (2006–13) to GM Daryl Morey with the Houston Rockets, switched to consultant (2013) and VP of basketball operations with the Philadelphia 76ers (2014–16) under Sam Hinkie, and transitioned to assistant general manager (2018–19) with the Detroit Pistons.

In 2018, Daryl Morey said, "Sachin's fingerprints are all over this time, from his first six seasons with the Rockets to contributions he's made this past year."

In May 2019, the Minnesota Timberwolves named Gupta as the new EVP of Basketball Operations under president Gersson Rosas. Gupta provided specialized expertise on the NBA Collective Bargaining Agreement and team analytics.

General Manager Scott Layden said at the time, “Sachin makes the team better because we know that we have in front of us, a guy who was really a great friend, but also we know he's the smartest guy in the room who can help us and steer us in the right direction.”

Rosas praised Sachin's basketball expertise and diverse professional background, noting that his role in Minnesota extended beyond statistical analysis to include regular scouting assignments, film sessions and collaboration with coaches and players.

On September 22, 2021, shortly after Rosas was relieved of his duties as President of Basketball Operations, Gupta was promoted as the new interim President of Basketball Operations, while keeping his role as EVP of Basketball Operations.

In September 2024 it was announced that Gupta would leave his position at the Timberwolves to join soccer club Chelsea F.C.

== See also ==
- List of National Basketball Association team presidents
