= List of current NBA team rosters =

Below are links to two lists of current National Basketball Association (NBA) team rosters. NBA rosters are limited to 15 players during the regular season, plus three players on two-way contracts, expanding each team's roster to 18 players maximum. Teams may carry up to 20 players during the offseason.

Due to technical limitations, this list is split into two lists by conference during the offseason when rosters are larger.

== Eastern Conference ==
There are 15 teams in the Eastern Conference.

- List of current NBA Eastern Conference team rosters

== Western Conference ==
There are 15 teams in the Western Conference.

- List of current NBA Western Conference team rosters

== See also ==
- List of current National Basketball Association head coaches
- List of National Basketball Association general managers
- List of National Basketball Association team presidents
