= 2022–23 Utah Jazz season =

- Head coach: Will Hardy
- General manager: Justin Zanik
- Owner: Ryan Smith
- Arena: Vivint Arena

Results
- Record: 37–45 (.451)
- Place: Division: 4th (Northwest); Conference: 12th (Western)
- Playoff finish: Did not qualify
- Stats at Basketball Reference

Local media
- Television: AT&T SportsNet Rocky Mountain
- Radio: 1280; 97.5 The Zone

The 2022–23 Utah Jazz season was the 49th season for the franchise in the National Basketball Association (NBA). During this season, the team had hosted the 2023 NBA All-Star Game held at Vivint Arena. On June 5, 2022, Quin Snyder resigned from his position as head coach of the Utah Jazz after eight seasons with the team. On June 29, 2022, the Utah Jazz hired Will Hardy as their head coach. For the first time since 2017–18 season, Rudy Gobert and Donovan Mitchell were not on the roster as they were traded before the season. The team had also introduced their new logo, as well as a black, white, and yellow "remix" color scheme, which remained in place until the 2024–25 season.

The Jazz got to a hot start, going 10–3 in their first 13 games. However, they struggled down the road, as after that they tip-toed between .500 and below. They would go 27–42 in their final games, which led to them being eliminated from playoff contention for the first time since 2016 on April 6, 2023, following their loss to the Thunder and suffering their first losing season since the same year.

Finishing with a 37–45 record for the twelfth place in the West, this also ended a streak of six straight playoff appearances for the Jazz.

== Draft ==
The Jazz had no selections in the 2022 draft. They owed their first-round pick to the Memphis Grizzlies. However, the Jazz later acquired Ochai Agbaji (picked 14th that year) and Walker Kessler (picked 22nd that year) in off-season trades made by trading Donovan Mitchell to the Cleveland Cavaliers and Rudy Gobert to the Minnesota Timberwolves, respectively.

== Roster ==
2022–23 Utah Jazz roster
Players

Pos.	No.	Player	Height	Weight	DOB	From
G	30	Ochai Agbaji	6 ft 5 in (1.96 m)	215 lb (98 kg)	2000-04-20	Kansas
C	20	Udoka Azubuike	7 ft 0 in (2.13 m)	270 lb (122 kg)	1999-09-17	Kansas
C	13	Vernon Jr. Carey	6 ft 10 in (2.08 m)	270 lb (122 kg)	2001-02-25	Duke
G	00	Jordan Clarkson (injured)	6 ft 5 in (1.96 m)	194 lb (88 kg)	1992-06-07	Missouri
G	11	Kris Dunn	6 ft 3 in (1.91 m)	205 lb (93 kg)	1994-03-18	Providence
F	16	Simone Fontecchio	6 ft 7 in (2.01 m)	209 lb (95 kg)	1995-12-09	Italy
F	22	Rudy Gay (injured)	6 ft 8 in (2.03 m)	250 lb (113 kg)	1986-08-17	Connecticut
G	0	Talen Horton-Tucker	6 ft 4 in (1.93 m)	234 lb (106 kg)	2000-11-25	Iowa State
C	15	Damian Jones	7 ft 0 in (2.13 m)	245 lb (111 kg)	1995-06-30	Vanderbilt
G	33	Johnny Juzang (TW)	6 ft 6 in (1.98 m)	209 lb (95 kg)	2001-03-17	UCLA
C	24	Walker Kessler	7 ft 1 in (2.16 m)	245 lb (111 kg)	2001-07-26	Auburn
F	23	Lauri Markkanen	7 ft 0 in (2.13 m)	240 lb (109 kg)	1997-05-22	Arizona
F/C	41	Kelly Olynyk	6 ft 11 in (2.11 m)	240 lb (109 kg)	1991-04-19	Gonzaga
C	25	Micah Potter (TW)	6 ft 10 in (2.08 m)	248 lb (112 kg)	1998-04-06	Wisconsin
F	19	Luka Šamanić	6 ft 10 in (2.08 m)	227 lb (103 kg)	2000-01-09	Croatia
G	2	Collin Sexton	6 ft 2 in (1.88 m)	190 lb (86 kg)	1999-01-04	Alabama
F	95	Juan Toscano-Anderson	6 ft 6 in (1.98 m)	209 lb (95 kg)	1993-04-10	Marquette

Coaches
Head coach
- Will Hardy
Assistant(s)
- Bryan Bailey
- Alex Jensen
- Sean Sheldon
- Lamar Skeeter

Legend
- (DP) Unsigned draft pick
- (FA) Free agent
- (S) Suspended
- (GL) On assignment to G League affiliate
- (TW) Two-way affiliate player
- Injured

Roster
Updated: February 11, 2026

== Standings ==
=== Division ===
Northwest Division	W	L	PCT	GB	Home	Road	Div	GP
c – Denver Nuggets	53	29	.646	–	34‍–‍7	19‍–‍22	10–6	82
x – Minnesota Timberwolves	42	40	.512	11.0	22‍–‍19	20‍–‍21	8–8	82
pi – Oklahoma City Thunder	40	42	.488	13.0	24‍–‍17	16‍–‍25	9–7	82
Utah Jazz	37	45	.451	16.0	23‍–‍18	14‍–‍27	6–10	82
Portland Trail Blazers	33	49	.402	20.0	17‍–‍24	16‍–‍25	7–9	82

=== Conference ===
Western Conference
#	Team	W	L	PCT	GB	GP
1	c – Denver Nuggets *	53	29	.646	–	82
2	y – Memphis Grizzlies *	51	31	.622	2.0	82
3	y – Sacramento Kings *	48	34	.585	5.0	82
4	x – Phoenix Suns	45	37	.549	8.0	82
5	x – Los Angeles Clippers	44	38	.537	9.0	82
6	x – Golden State Warriors	44	38	.537	9.0	82
7	x – Los Angeles Lakers	43	39	.524	10.0	82
8	x – Minnesota Timberwolves	42	40	.512	11.0	82
9	pi – New Orleans Pelicans	42	40	.512	11.0	82
10	pi – Oklahoma City Thunder	40	42	.488	13.0	82
11	Dallas Mavericks	38	44	.463	15.0	82
12	Utah Jazz	37	45	.451	16.0	82
13	Portland Trail Blazers	33	49	.402	20.0	82
14	Houston Rockets	22	60	.268	31.0	82
15	San Antonio Spurs	22	60	.268	31.0	82

== Game log ==
=== Preseason ===
2022 preseason game log
Total: 1–3 (Home: 0–2; Road: 1–1)
Preseason: 1–3 (home: 0–2; road: 1–1)

Game	Date	Team	Score	High points	High rebounds	High assists	Location Attendance	Record
1	October 2	@ Toronto	L 82–114	Lauri Markkanen (20)	Gay, Olynyk (6)	Jarred Vanderbilt (6)	Rogers Place; 17,100	0–1
2	October 4	@ Portland	W 118–101	Jordan Clarkson (19)	Jarred Vanderbilt (7)	Kelly Olynyk (6)	Moda Center; 15,197	1–1
3	October 11	San Antonio	L 104–111	Lauri Markkanen (18)	Gay, Markkanen (10)	Butler, Clarkson (7)	Vivint Arena; 13,887	1–2
4	October 14	Dallas	L 101–115	Lauri Markkanen (21)	Lauri Markkanen (10)	Conley Jr., Sexton (7)	Vivint Arena; 15,713	1–3

2022–23 preseason schedule

=== Regular season ===
2022–23 game log
Total: 37–45 (Home: 23–18; Road: 14–27)
October: 6–2 (home: 4–0; road: 2–2)

Game	Date	Team	Score	High points	High rebounds	High assists	Location Attendance	Record
1	October 19	Denver	W 123–102	Collin Sexton (20)	Jarred Vanderbilt (12)	Mike Conley Jr. (8)	Vivint Arena; 18,206	1–0
2	October 21	@ Minnesota	W 132–126 (OT)	Jordan Clarkson (29)	Jarred Vanderbilt (14)	Mike Conley Jr. (11)	Target Center; 17,136	2–0
3	October 23	@ New Orleans	W 122–121 (OT)	Lauri Markkanen (31)	Lauri Markkanen (12)	Mike Conley Jr. (8)	Smoothie King Center; 18,665	3–0
4	October 24	@ Houston	L 108–114	Jordan Clarkson (17)	Jarred Vanderbilt (11)	Mike Conley Jr. (7)	Toyota Center; 16,260	3–1
5	October 26	Houston	W 109–101	Lauri Markkanen (24)	Lauri Markkanen (9)	Kelly Olynyk (6)	Vivint Arena; 18,206	4–1
6	October 28	@ Denver	L 101–117	Lauri Markkanen (17)	Lauri Markkanen (10)	Mike Conley Jr. (5)	Ball Arena; 19,560	4–2
7	October 29	Memphis	W 124–123	Markkanen, Olynyk (23)	Lauri Markkanen (9)	Jarred Vanderbilt (7)	Vivint Arena; 18,206	5–2
8	October 31	Memphis	W 121–105	Lauri Markkanen (31)	Lauri Markkanen (11)	Jordan Clarkson (7)	Vivint Arena; 18,206	6–2

November : 7–9 (home: 3–3; road: 4–6)

Game	Date	Team	Score	High points	High rebounds	High assists	Location Attendance	Record
9	November 2	@ Dallas	L 100–103	Jordan Clarkson (22)	Malik Beasley (8)	Clarkson, Conley Jr. (8)	American Airlines Center; 19,877	6–3
10	November 4	@ L.A. Lakers	W 130–116	Lauri Markkanen (27)	Lauri Markkanen (13)	Mike Conley Jr. (10)	Crypto.com Arena; 18,997	7–3
11	November 6	@ L.A. Clippers	W 110–102	Jordan Clarkson (23)	Lauri Markkanen (9)	Jordan Clarkson (5)	Crypto.com Arena; 16,111	8–3
12	November 7	L.A. Lakers	W 139–116	Lauri Markkanen (23)	Walker Kessler (9)	Mike Conley Jr. (12)	Vivint Arena; 18,206	9–3
13	November 9	@ Atlanta	W 125–119	Lauri Markkanen (32)	Lauri Markkanen (8)	Mike Conley Jr. (13)	State Farm Arena; 15,845	10–3
14	November 12	@ Washington	L 112–121	Jordan Clarkson (18)	Jarred Vanderbilt (8)	Conley Jr., Horton-Tucker (10)	Capital One Arena; 13,673	10–4
15	November 13	@ Philadelphia	L 98–105	Malik Beasley (18)	Markkanen, Vanderbilt (10)	Mike Conley Jr. (8)	Wells Fargo Center; 19,761	10–5
16	November 15	New York	L 111–118	Kelly Olynyk (27)	Kelly Olynyk (11)	Mike Conley Jr. (7)	Vivint Arena; 18,206	10–6
17	November 18	Phoenix	W 134–133	Lauri Markkanen (38)	Jarred Vanderbilt (11)	Mike Conley Jr. (10)	Vivint Arena; 18,206	11–6
18	November 19	@ Portland	W 118–113	Malik Beasley (29)	Lauri Markkanen (10)	Clarkson, Olynyk, Sexton (4)	Moda Center; 19,595	12–6
19	November 21	@ L.A. Clippers	L 114–121	Jordan Clarkson (26)	Markkanen, Vanderbilt (10)	Jarred Vanderbilt (5)	Crypto.com Arena; 19,068	12–7
20	November 23	Detroit	L 116–125	Malik Beasley (29)	Malik Beasley (11)	Collin Sexton (12)	Vivint Arena; 18,206	12–8
21	November 25	@ Golden State	L 118–129	Lauri Markkanen (24)	Jarred Vanderbilt (10)	Jordan Clarkson (10)	Chase Center; 18,064	12–9
22	November 26	@ Phoenix	L 112–113	Jordan Clarkson (22)	Lauri Markkanen (10)	Clarkson, Sexton (5)	Footprint Center; 17,071	12–10
23	November 28	Chicago	L 107–114	Lauri Markkanen (32)	Lauri Markkanen (9)	Jordan Clarkson (9)	Vivint Arena; 18,206	12–11
24	November 30	L.A. Clippers	W 125–112	Jordan Clarkson (33)	Jarred Vanderbilt (12)	Collin Sexton (6)	Vivint Arena; 18,206	13–11

December: 5–9 (home: 5–3; road: 0–6)

Game	Date	Team	Score	High points	High rebounds	High assists	Location Attendance	Record
25	December 2	Indiana	W 139–119	Lauri Markkanen (24)	Lauri Markkanen (13)	Talen Horton-Tucker (9)	Vivint Arena; 18,206	14–11
26	December 3	Portland	L 111–116	Jordan Clarkson (24)	Kelly Olynyk (9)	Kelly Olynyk (6)	Vivint Arena; 18,206	14–12
27	December 7	Golden State	W 124–123	Jordan Clarkson (22)	Walker Kessler (12)	Jordan Clarkson (9)	Vivint Arena; 18,206	15–12
28	December 9	Minnesota	L 108–118	Malik Beasley (23)	Jarred Vanderbilt (10)	Mike Conley Jr. (6)	Vivint Arena; 18,206	15–13
29	December 10	@ Denver	L 110–115	Nickeil Alexander-Walker (27)	Kelly Olynyk (9)	Horton-Tucker, Vanderbilt (4)	Ball Arena; 19,636	15–14
30	December 13	New Orleans	W 121–100	Malik Beasley (21)	Walker Kessler (16)	Alexander-Walker, Conley Jr., Vanderbilt (6)	Vivint Arena; 18,206	16–14
31	December 15	New Orleans	W 132–129 (OT)	Jordan Clarkson (39)	Clarkson, Kessler (8)	Mike Conley Jr. (6)	Vivint Arena; 18,206	17–14
32	December 17	@ Milwaukee	L 97–123	Beasley, Markkanen (18)	Jarred Vanderbilt (6)	Nickeil Alexander-Walker (5)	Fiserv Forum; 17,587	17–15
33	December 19	@ Cleveland	L 99–122	Lauri Markkanen (24)	Kessler, Markkanen, Vanderbilt (6)	Mike Conley Jr. (9)	Rocket Mortgage FieldHouse; 19,432	17–16
34	December 20	@ Detroit	W 126–111	Lauri Markkanen (38)	Jarred Vanderbilt (13)	Mike Conley Jr. (7)	Little Caesars Arena; 15,622	18–16
35	December 22	Washington	W 120–112	Malik Beasley (25)	Walker Kessler (14)	Mike Conley Jr. (6)	Vivint Arena; 18,206	19–16
36	December 26	@ San Antonio	L 122–126	Lauri Markkanen (32)	Lauri Markkanen (12)	Mike Conley Jr. (6)	AT&T Center; 16,351	19–17
37	December 28	@ Golden State	L 107–112	Lauri Markkanen (29)	Lauri Markkanen (16)	Mike Conley Jr. (10)	Chase Center; 18,064	19–18
38	December 30	@ Sacramento	L 125–126	Lauri Markkanen (36)	Kessler, Vanderbilt (8)	Jordan Clarkson (9)	Golden 1 Center; 17,946	19–19
39	December 31	Miami	L 123–126	Lauri Markkanen (29)	Lauri Markkanen (14)	Mike Conley Jr. (8)	Vivint Arena; 18,206	19–20

January: 7–6 (home: 5–3; road: 2–3)

Game	Date	Team	Score	High points	High rebounds	High assists	Location Attendance	Record
40	January 3	Sacramento	L 115–117	Lauri Markkanen (28)	Jarred Vanderbilt (9)	Mike Conley Jr. (7)	Vivint Arena; 18,206	19–21
41	January 5	@ Houston	W 131–114	Lauri Markkanen (49)	Jarred Vanderbilt (9)	Mike Conley Jr. (11)	Toyota Center; 16,320	20–21
42	January 7	@ Chicago	L 118–126	Lauri Markkanen (28)	Jarred Vanderbilt (14)	Jordan Clarkson (8)	United Center; 21,694	20–22
43	January 8	@ Memphis	L 118–123	Lauri Markkanen (21)	Walker Kessler (11)	Mike Conley Jr. (8)	FedExForum; 17,794	20–23
44	January 10	Cleveland	W 116–114	Jordan Clarkson (32)	Lauri Markkanen (16)	Beasley, Clarkson, Conley Jr. (4)	Vivint Arena; 18,206	21–23
45	January 13	Orlando	W 112–108	Lauri Markkanen (28)	Clarkson, Markkanen (12)	Collin Sexton (3)	Vivint Arena; 18,206	22–23
46	January 14	Philadelphia	L 117–118	Jordan Clarkson (38)	Walker Kessler (12)	Mike Conley Jr. (8)	Vivint Arena; 18,202	22–24
47	January 16	@ Minnesota	W 126–125	Jordan Clarkson (21)	Walker Kessler (21)	Mike Conley Jr. (6)	Target Center; 16,477	23–24
48	January 18	L.A. Clippers	W 126–103	Lauri Markkanen (34)	Lauri Markkanen (12)	Mike Conley Jr. (9)	Vivint Arena; 18,206	24–24
49	January 20	Brooklyn	L 106–117	Jordan Clarkson (29)	Lauri Markkanen (11)	Mike Conley Jr. (9)	Vivint Arena; 18,206	24–25
50	January 23	Charlotte	W 120–102	Lauri Markkanen (25)	Lauri Markkanen (11)	Talen Horton-Tucker (6)	Vivint Arena; 18,206	25–25
51	January 25	@ Portland	L 124–134	Lauri Markkanen (24)	Malik Beasley (6)	Mike Conley (10)	Moda Center; 18,154	25–26
52	January 28	Dallas	W 108–100	Lauri Markkanen (29)	Walker Kessler (11)	Mike Conley (11)	Vivint Arena; 18,206	26–26

February : 4–6 (home: 2–4; road: 2–2)

Game	Date	Team	Score	High points	High rebounds	High assists	Location Attendance	Record
53	February 1	Toronto	W 131–128	Lauri Markkanen (28)	Walker Kessler (14)	Mike Conley Jr. (8)	Vivint Arena; 18,206	27–26
54	February 3	Atlanta	L 108–115	Lauri Markkanen (25)	Jarred Vanderbilt (11)	Mike Conley Jr. (8)	Vivint Arena; 18,206	27–27
55	February 6	Dallas	L 111–124	Jordan Clarkson (26)	Walker Kessler (9)	Mike Conley Jr. (11)	Vivint Arena; 18,206	27–28
56	February 8	Minnesota	L 118–143	Collin Sexton (22)	Walker Kessler (9)	Clarkson, Horton-Tucker (6)	Vivint Arena; 18,206	27–29
57	February 10	@ Toronto	W 122–116	Kessler, Markkanen (23)	Kessler, Markkanen (9)	Horton-Tucker, Olynyk (8)	Scotiabank Arena; 19,800	28–29
58	February 11	@ New York	L 120–126	Lauri Markkanen (29)	Walker Kessler (15)	Talen Horton-Tucker (7)	Madison Square Garden; 19,339	28–30
59	February 13	@ Indiana	W 123–117	Clarkson, Markkanen (29)	Lauri Markkanen (11)	Talen Horton-Tucker (7)	Gainbridge Fieldhouse; 15,004	29–30
60	February 15	@ Memphis	L 111–117	Kelly Olynyk (28)	Kessler, Olynyk (14)	Talen Horton-Tucker (7)	FedEx Forum; 16,748	29–31
61	February 23	Oklahoma City	W 120–119 (OT)	Lauri Markkanen (43)	Walker Kessler (17)	Clarkson, Horton-Tucker (6)	Vivint Arena; 18,206	30–31
62	February 25	San Antonio	W 118–102	Lauri Markkanen (27)	Walker Kessler (12)	Kris Dunn (8)	Vivint Arena; 18,206	31–31
63	February 28	San Antonio	L 94–102	Lauri Markkanen (28)	Walker Kessler (15)	Dunn, Horton-Tucker (3)	Vivint Arena; 18,206	31–32

March : 5–9 (home: 2–3; road: 3–6)

Game	Date	Team	Score	High points	High rebounds	High assists	Location Attendance	Record
64	March 3	@ Oklahoma	L 103–130	Lauri Markkanen (20)	Walker Kessler (11)	Kris Dunn (6)	Paycom Center; 16,538	31–33
65	March 5	@ Oklahoma	L 119–129	Jordan Clarkson (18)	Kessler, Olynyk (10)	Jordan Clarkson (12)	Paycom Center; 14,778	31–34
66	March 7	@ Dallas	L 116–120	Lauri Markkanen (33)	Kris Dunn (8)	Kris Dunn (5)	American Airlines Center; 20,277	31–35
67	March 9	@ Orlando	W 131–124	Lauri Markkanen (31)	Walker Kessler (10)	Talen Horton-Tucker (8)	Amway Center; 16,552	32–35
68	March 11	@ Charlotte	W 119–111	Talen Horton-Tucker (37)	Walker Kessler (16)	Talen Horton-Tucker (10)	Spectrum Center; 17,221	33–35
69	March 13	@ Miami	L 115–119	Lauri Markkanen (38)	Walker Kessler (9)	Dunn, Horton-Tucker (8)	Miami-Dade Arena; 19,721	33–36
70	March 18	Boston	W 118–117	Lauri Markkanen (28)	Walker Kessler (14)	Dunn, Olynyk (6)	Vivint Arena; 18,206	34–36
71	March 20	Sacramento	W 128–120	Ochai Agbaji (27)	Kelly Olynyk (10)	Kris Dunn (10)	Vivint Arena; 18,206	35–36
72	March 22	Portland	L 115–127	Lauri Markkanen (40)	Lauri Markkanen (12)	Talen Horton-Tucker (7)	Vivint Arena	35–37
73	March 24	Milwaukee	L 116–144	Simone Fontecchio (26)	Udoka Azubuike (9)	Talen Horton-Tucker (8)	Vivint Arena; 18,206	35–38
74	March 25	@ Sacramento	L 113–121	Walker Kessler (31)	Walker Kessler (11)	Kelly Olynyk (10)	Golden 1 Center; 18,151	35–39
75	March 27	Phoenix	L 103–117	Lauri Markkanen (25)	Lauri Markkanen (9)	Talen Horton-Tucker (8)	Vivint Arena; 18,206	35–40
76	March 29	@ San Antonio	W 128–117	Talen Horton-Tucker (41)	Walker Kessler (10)	Horton-Tucker, Dunn (5)	AT&T Center; 18,354	36–40
77	March 31	@ Boston	L 114–122	Talen Horton-Tucker (28)	Walker Kessler (10)	Talen Horton-Tucker (7)	TD Garden; 19,156	36–41

April : 1–4 (home: 1–2; road: 0–2)

Game	Date	Team	Score	High points	High rebounds	High assists	Location Attendance	Record
78	April 2	@ Brooklyn	L 110–111	Talen Horton-Tucker (32)	Kelly Olynyk (15)	Talen Horton-Tucker (8)	Barclays Center; 17,732	36–42
79	April 4	L.A. Lakers	L 133–135 (OT)	Horton-Tucker, Olynyk (23)	Damian Jones (8)	Horton-Tucker, Olynyk (7)	Vivint Arena; 18,206	36–43
80	April 6	Oklahoma City	L 98–114	Kris Dunn (22)	Kelly Olynyk (14)	Dunn, Olynyk (8)	Vivint Arena; 18,206	36–44
81	April 8	Denver	W 118–114	Ochai Agbaji (28)	Udoka Azubuike (11)	Kris Dunn (14)	Vivint Arena; 18,206	37–44
82	April 9	@ L.A. Lakers	L 117–128	Kris Dunn (26)	Kris Dunn (10)	Agbaji, Dunn (8)	Crypto.com Arena; 18,997	37–45

2022–23 season schedule

== Player statistics ==
Legend
GP	Games played	GS	Games started	MPG	Minutes per game
FG%	Field-goal percentage	3P%	3-point field-goal percentage	FT%	Free-throw percentage
RPG	Rebounds per game	APG	Assists per game	SPG	Steals per game
BPG	Blocks per game	PPG	Points per game

=== Regular season ===
Player	GP	GS	MPG	FG%	3P%	FT%	RPG	APG	SPG	BPG	PPG
Walker Kessler	74	40	23.0	.720	.333	.516	8.4	.9	.4	2.3	9.2
Kelly Olynyk	68	68	28.6	.499	.394	.853	6.2	3.7	.9	.5	12.5
Lauri Markkanen	66	66	34.4	.499	.391	.875	8.6	1.9	.6	.6	25.6
Talen Horton-Tucker	65	20	20.2	.419	.286	.750	3.2	3.8	.6	.4	10.7
Jordan Clarkson	61	61	32.6	.444	.338	.816	4.0	4.4	.5	.2	20.8
Ochai Agbaji	59	22	20.5	.427	.355	.812	2.1	1.1	.3	.3	7.9
Rudy Gay	56	0	14.6	.380	.254	.857	2.9	1.0	.3	.3	5.2
Malik Beasley^{†}	55	13	26.8	.396	.359	.841	3.6	1.7	.8	.1	13.4
Jarred Vanderbilt^{†}	52	41	24.1	.556	.333	.657	7.9	2.7	1.0	.3	8.3
Simone Fontecchio	52	6	14.7	.369	.330	.795	1.7	.8	.3	.2	6.3
Collin Sexton	48	15	23.9	.506	.393	.819	2.2	2.9	.6	.1	14.3
Mike Conley Jr.^{†}	43	42	29.7	.408	.362	.813	2.5	7.7	1.0	.2	10.7
Udoka Azubuike	36	4	10.0	.819		.350	3.3	.3	.2	.4	3.5
Nickeil Alexander-Walker^{†}	36	3	14.7	.488	.402	.692	1.6	2.1	.7	.4	6.3
Kris Dunn	22	3	25.8	.537	.472	.774	4.5	5.6	1.1	.5	13.2
Juan Toscano-Anderson^{†}	22	2	15.2	.403	.174	.889	2.9	1.8	.3	.1	3.4
Damian Jones^{†}	19	0	15.8	.714	.714	.778	3.5	.6	.3	.5	4.6
Johnny Juzang	18	0	12.9	.337	.238	.500	2.2	.4	.2	.2	4.8
Leandro Bolmaro	14	0	4.9	.150	.000		.5	.5	.2	.1	.4
Luka Šamanić	7	4	23.0	.456	.258	.692	4.3	2.1	.9	.3	9.9
Micah Potter	7	0	7.4	.667	.571		2.3	.6	.1	.0	3.4
Jarrell Brantley	4	0	9.8	.571	.444	1.000	1.5	.8	.0	.5	5.5
Frank Jackson	1	0	5.0	.000	.000		2.0	1.0	.0	.0	.0

- ^{†} Denotes player spent time with another team in the season. Stats reflect time with the Jazz only.

== Transactions ==
=== Trades ===
June 30, 2022	To Utah Jazz 2023 first-round pick	To Brooklyn Nets Royce O'Neale
July 6, 2022	To Utah Jazz Malik Beasley; Patrick Beverley; Leandro Bolmaro; Jarred Vanderbilt; Draft rights to Walker Kessler (No. 22); 2023 MIN first-round pick 2025 MIN first-round pick 2026 right to swap first-round picks 2027 MIN first-round pick 2029 MIN first-round pick	To Minnesota Timberwolves Rudy Gobert
August 25, 2022	To Utah Jazz Talen Horton-Tucker; Stanley Johnson	To Los Angeles Lakers Patrick Beverley
September 3, 2022	To Utah Jazz Collin Sexton; Lauri Markkanen; Ochai Agbaji; 2025 CLE first-round pick 2026 first-round pick swap 2027 CLE first-round pick 2028 first-round pick swap 2029 CLE first-round pick	To Cleveland Cavaliers Donovan Mitchell
September 22, 2022	To Utah Jazz Saben Lee; Kelly Olynyk	To Detroit Pistons Bojan Bogdanović

=== Free agency ===
==== Additions ====
Date	Player	Former team	Ref.
July 15	Johnny Juzang	UCLA	
July 27	Simone Fontecchio	Saski Baskonia	
March 18	Jarrell Brantley	New Zealand Breakers	

==== Subtractions ====
Date	Player	Reason left	New team	Ref.
June 30	Juancho Hernangómez	Waived	Toronto Raptors	
July 6	Danuel House	Free agent	Philadelphia 76ers	
October 15	Jared Butler	Waived	Oklahoma City Thunder	
