= List of Utah Jazz head coaches =

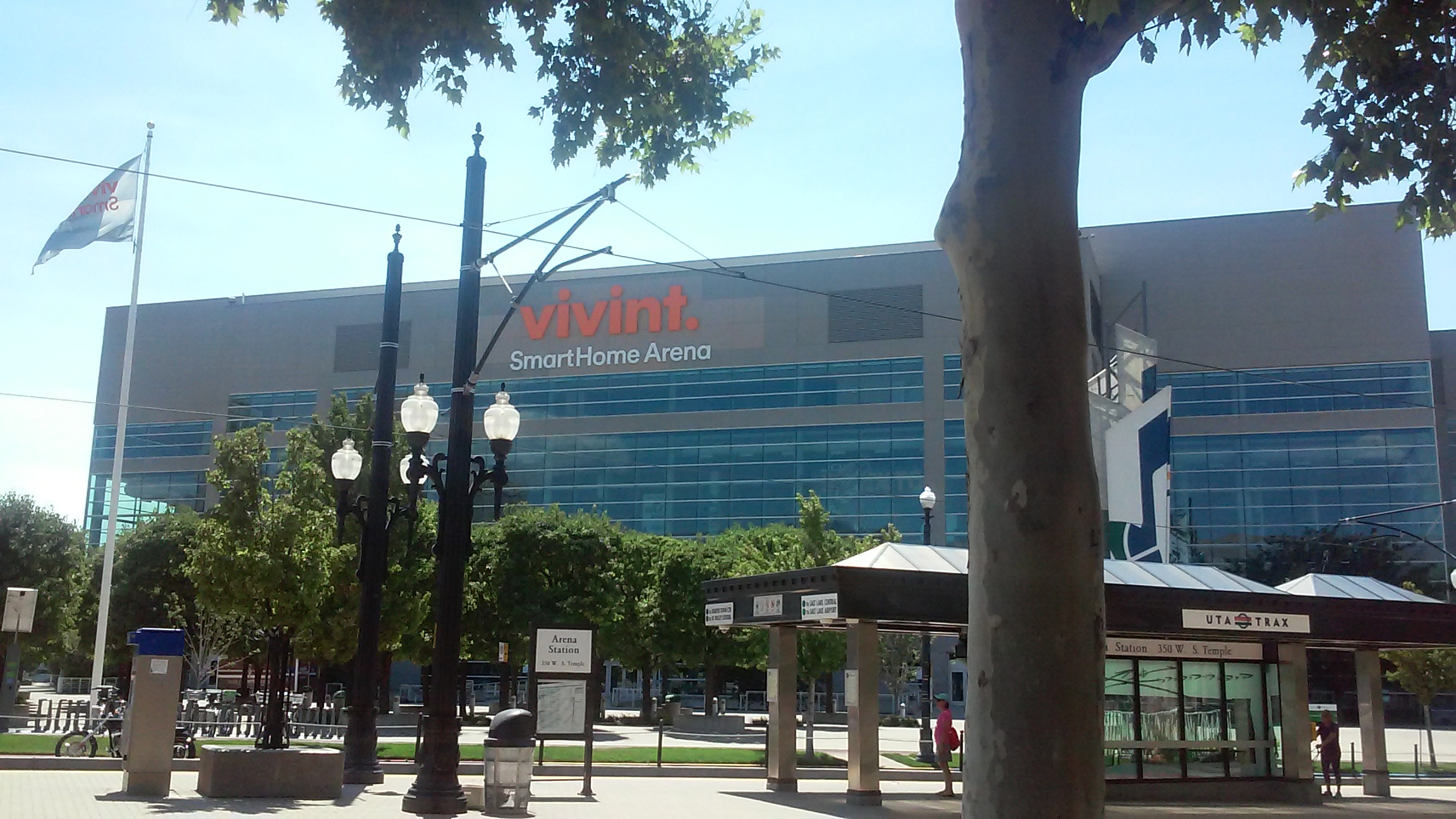
The Jazz have played in Vivint Arena since 1991.

The Utah Jazz is an American professional basketball team based in Salt Lake City, Utah. They play in the Northwest Division of the Western Conference in the National Basketball Association (NBA).

The team joined the NBA in 1974 as an expansion team called the New Orleans Jazz. The Jazz relocated to Salt Lake City, Utah in 1979. The Jazz have won two consecutive Western Conference championships in 1997 and 1998. The Jazz have played their home games at Vivint Arena, first known as Delta Center and then the EnergySolutions Arena, since 1991. The Jazz is owned by Ryan Smith.

There have been eight head coaches for the Jazz franchise. The franchise's first head coach was Scotty Robertson, who coached for 14 games. Jerry Sloan is the franchise's all-time leader for the most regular-season games coached (1,673), the most regular-season game wins (1,043), the highest regular-season winning percentage (.623), the most playoff games coached (186), the most playoff-game wins (92), and the highest playoff winning percentage (.495). Sloan is the first coach to win over 1000 games with one NBA team, the leader for the most consecutive seasons coached with the same team in major professional sports history, having coached for 21 seasons with the Jazz, and the only Jazz coach to have been elected into the Basketball Hall of Fame as a coach, having been enshrined in 2009. Frank Layden, who coached the Jazz for eight seasons, is the only Jazz coach to have won the NBA Coach of the Year Award, having won it in the 1983–84 season. Layden is also the only coach to have a number retired by the Jazz ("1" in 1988). Elgin Baylor and Layden have spent their entire NBA coaching careers with the Jazz. Sloan had been the head coach of the Jazz from 1988 until his retirement in 2011. From 2011 to the end of the 2013/2014 season the Jazz were coached by Tyrone Corbin. He was followed by Quin Snyder. The current coach is Will Hardy.

== Key ==
GC	Games coached
W	Wins
L	Losses
Win%	Winning percentage
#	Number of coaches^{[a]}
*	Spent entire NBA head coaching career with the Jazz
†	Elected into the Basketball Hall of Fame as a coach

== Coaches ==
Note: Statistics are correct through the end of the 2025–26 season.

#	Name	Term^{[b]}	GC	W	L	Win%	GC	W	L	Win%	Achievements	Reference
#	Name	Term^{[b]}	Regular season				Playoffs				Achievements	Reference
New Orleans Jazz
1	Scotty Robertson	1974	15	1	14	.067	0	0	0	–		
2	Elgin Baylor*	1974	1	0	1	.000	0	0	0	–		
3	Butch van Breda Kolff	1974–1976	174	74	100	.425	0	0	0	–		
—	Elgin Baylor*	1976–1979	220	86	134	.391	0	0	0	–		
Utah Jazz
4	Tom Nissalke	1979–1981	184	60	124	.326	0	0	0	–		
5	Frank Layden*	1981–1988	571	277	294	.485	41	18	23	.439	1983–84 NBA Coach of the Year; Had the number 1 jersey retired by the Jazz in 1988	
6	Jerry Sloan†	1988–2011	1809	1127	682	.623	196	96	100	.490	2 Western Conference championships (1997, 1998); Most consecutive games coached with the same team in NBA history First coach to have more than 1,000 wins with a single NBA team	
7	Tyrone Corbin*	2011–2014	258	112	146	.434	4	0	4	.000		
8	Quin Snyder*	2014–2022	636	372	264	.585	51	21	30	.412		
9	Will Hardy	2022–present	328	107	221	.326	—	—	—	–		

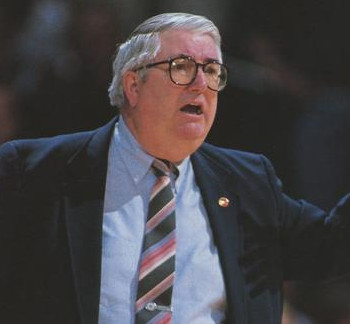
Frank Layden was the head coach of the Utah Jazz from 1981 to 1988

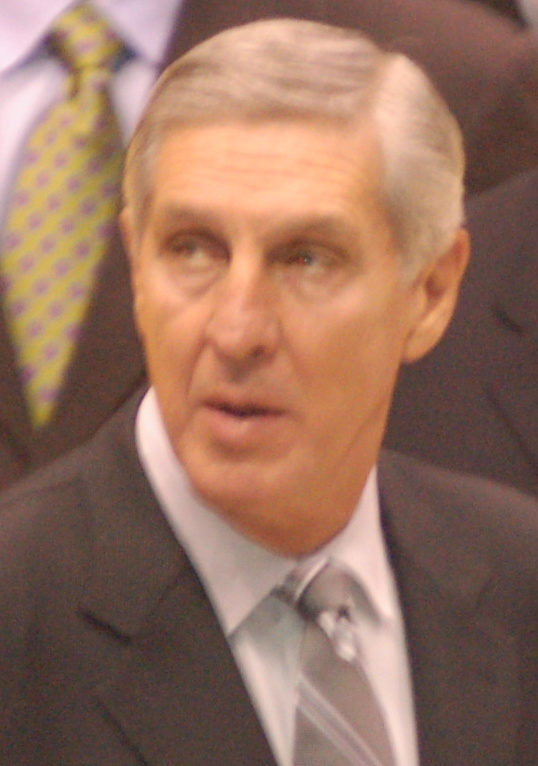
Jerry Sloan was the head coach of the Utah Jazz from 1988 to 2011, and led them to the NBA Finals in 1997 and 1998

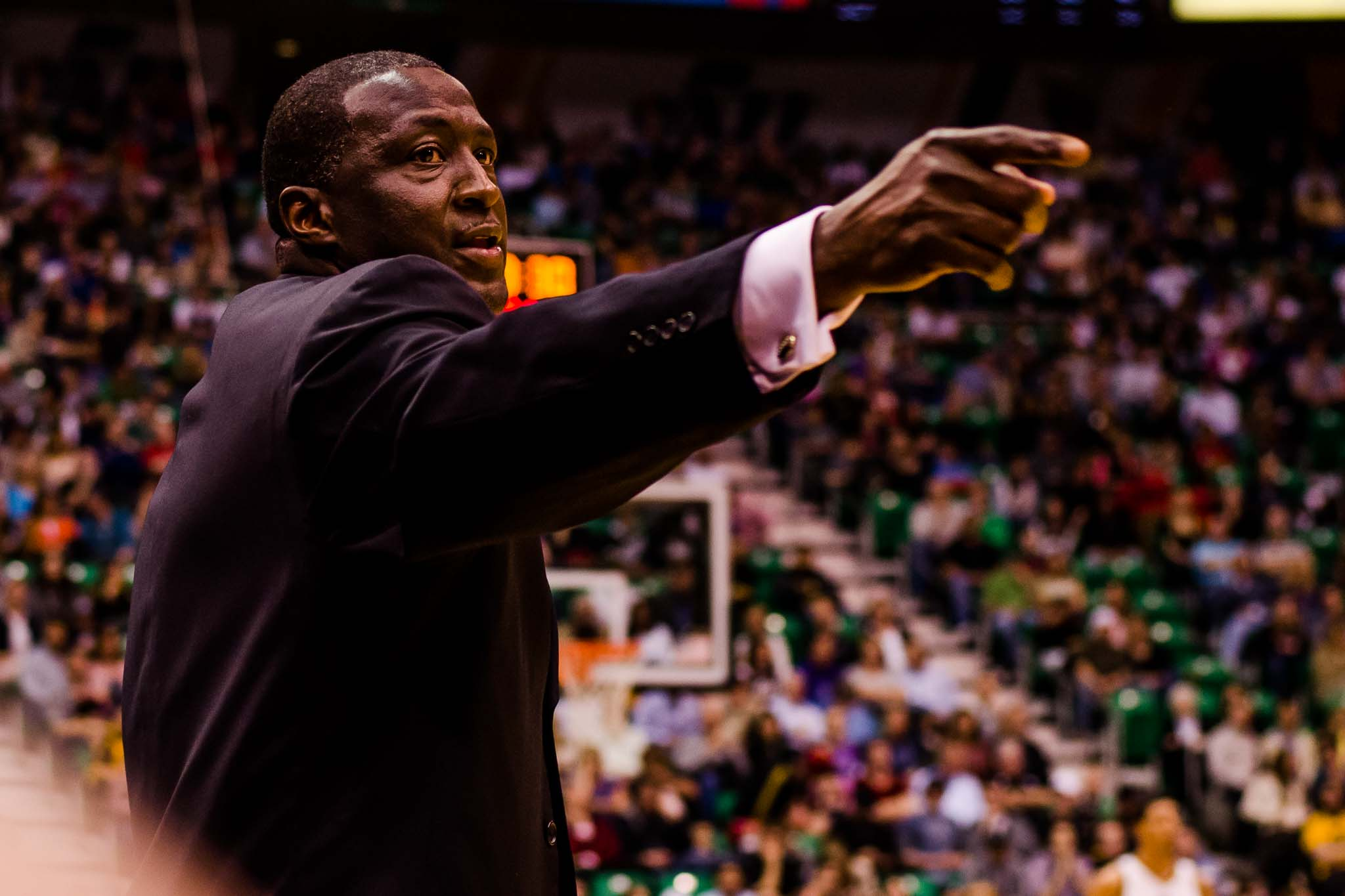
Tyrone Corbin was the head coach of the Utah Jazz from 2011 to 2014

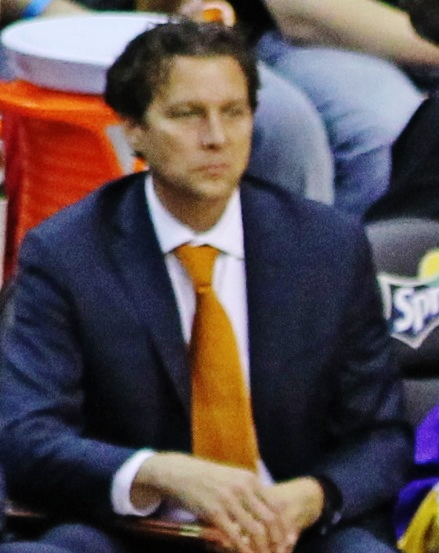
Quin Snyder was the head coach of the Utah Jazz from 2014 to 2022

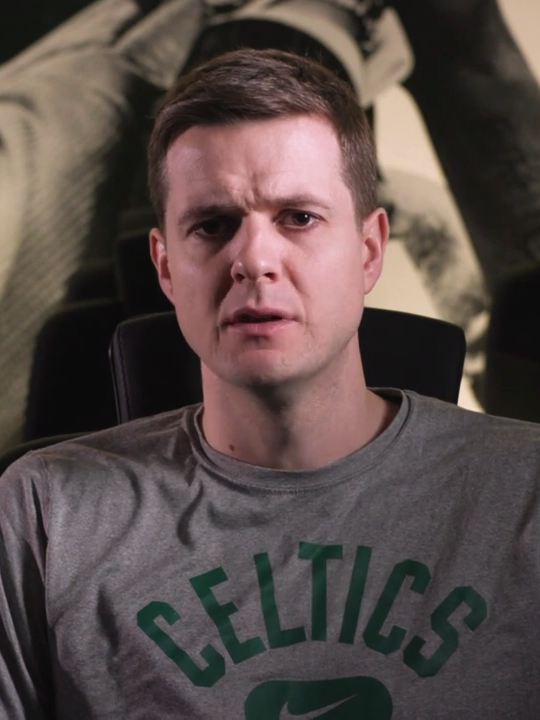
Will Hardy is the head coach of the Utah Jazz since 2022

== Notes ==
- ^{a} A running total of the number of coaches of the Jazz. Thus, any coach who has two or more separate terms as head coach is only counted once.
- ^{b} Each year is linked to an article about that particular NBA season.
