= List of current NBA Western Conference team rosters =

Below is a list of current National Basketball Association (NBA) Western Conference team rosters. NBA rosters are limited to 15 players during the regular season, plus three players on two-way contracts, expanding each team's roster to 18 players maximum. Teams may carry up to 21 players during the offseason.

There are 15 teams in the Western Conference.

== Northwest Division ==
=== Denver Nuggets ===
Denver Nuggets roster
Players

Pos.	No.	Player	Height	Weight	DOB	From
G	7	Tamar Bates (TW)	6 ft 4 in (1.93 m)	195 lb (88 kg)	2003-02-21	Missouri
G	0	Christian Braun (injured)	6 ft 6 in (1.98 m)	220 lb (100 kg)	2001-04-17	Kansas
G/F	11	Bruce Brown	6 ft 4 in (1.93 m)	202 lb (92 kg)	1996-08-15	Miami (FL)
F	32	Aaron Gordon	6 ft 8 in (2.03 m)	235 lb (107 kg)	1995-09-16	Arizona
G/F	10	Tim Hardaway Jr.	6 ft 5 in (1.96 m)	205 lb (93 kg)	1992-03-16	Michigan
F	14	DaRon Holmes II	6 ft 9 in (2.06 m)	225 lb (102 kg)	2002-09-15	Dayton
F	23	Cameron Johnson	6 ft 8 in (2.03 m)	210 lb (95 kg)	1996-03-03	North Carolina
C	15	Nikola Jokić	6 ft 11 in (2.11 m)	284 lb (129 kg)	1995-02-19	Serbia
G	1	Curtis Jones (TW)	6 ft 3 in (1.91 m)	195 lb (88 kg)	2001-10-04	Iowa State
F	21	Spencer Jones (TW)	6 ft 7 in (2.01 m)	225 lb (102 kg)	2001-06-14	Stanford
G	27	Jamal Murray	6 ft 4 in (1.93 m)	215 lb (98 kg)	1997-02-23	Kentucky
F/C	22	Zeke Nnaji	6 ft 10 in (2.08 m)	240 lb (109 kg)	2001-01-09	Arizona
G	24	Jalen Pickett	6 ft 2 in (1.88 m)	202 lb (92 kg)	1999-10-22	Penn State
G	3	Julian Strawther (injured)	6 ft 6 in (1.98 m)	205 lb (93 kg)	2002-04-18	Gonzaga
F	5	Hunter Tyson	6 ft 8 in (2.03 m)	215 lb (98 kg)	2000-06-13	Clemson
C	17	Jonas Valančiūnas	6 ft 11 in (2.11 m)	265 lb (120 kg)	1992-05-06	Lithuania
G	8	Peyton Watson	6 ft 8 in (2.03 m)	200 lb (91 kg)	2002-09-11	UCLA

Coaches
Head coach
- David Adelman
Assistant(s)
- J. J. Barea
- John Beckett
- Rodney Billups
- Ryan Bowen
- Chase Buford
- Jared Dudley
- Mike Moser
- Ognjen Stojaković
- Elvis Valcarcel

Legend
- (DP) Unsigned draft pick
- (FA) Free agent
- (S) Suspended
- (GL) On assignment to G League
- (TW) Two-way affiliate player
- Injured

Roster
Updated: November 19, 2025

=== Minnesota Timberwolves ===
Minnesota Timberwolves roster
Players

Pos.	No.	Player	Height	Weight	DOB	From
C	19	Joan Beringer	6 ft 11 in (2.11 m)	230 lb (104 kg)	2006-11-11	France
G	22	Jaylen Clark	6 ft 5 in (1.96 m)	205 lb (93 kg)	2001-10-13	UCLA
G	10	Mike Conley Jr.	6 ft 1 in (1.85 m)	175 lb (79 kg)	1987-10-11	Ohio State
G	4	Rob Dillingham	6 ft 2 in (1.88 m)	175 lb (79 kg)	2005-01-04	Kentucky
G	0	Donte DiVincenzo	6 ft 4 in (1.93 m)	203 lb (92 kg)	1997-01-31	Villanova
G	5	Anthony Edwards	6 ft 4 in (1.93 m)	225 lb (102 kg)	2001-08-05	Georgia
F	25	Enrique Freeman (TW)	6 ft 9 in (2.06 m)	220 lb (100 kg)	2000-07-29	Akron
C	27	Rudy Gobert	7 ft 1 in (2.16 m)	258 lb (117 kg)	1992-06-26	France
G	8	Bones Hyland	6 ft 2 in (1.88 m)	169 lb (77 kg)	2000-09-14	VCU
G/F	7	Joe Ingles	6 ft 8 in (2.03 m)	220 lb (100 kg)	1987-10-02	Australia
G	9	Johnny Juzang (TW)	6 ft 7 in (2.01 m)	226 lb (103 kg)	2001-03-17	UCLA
F	3	Jaden McDaniels	6 ft 9 in (2.06 m)	185 lb (84 kg)	2000-09-29	Washington
F	33	Leonard Miller	6 ft 10 in (2.08 m)	220 lb (100 kg)	2003-11-26	Fort Erie (CAN)
F/C	30	Julius Randle	6 ft 9 in (2.06 m)	250 lb (113 kg)	1994-11-29	Kentucky
F/C	11	Naz Reid	6 ft 9 in (2.06 m)	264 lb (120 kg)	1999-08-26	LSU
G/F	1	Terrence Shannon Jr.	6 ft 6 in (1.98 m)	215 lb (98 kg)	2000-07-30	Illinois
C	44	Rocco Zikarsky (TW)	7 ft 3 in (2.21 m)	227 lb (103 kg)	2006-07-11	Brisbane Grammar School

Coaches
Head coach
- Chris Finch
Assistant(s)
- Nathan Bubes
- Moses Ehambe
- Kevin Hanson
- Chris Hines
- Max Lefevre
- Jeff Newton
- Micah Nori
- Pablo Prigioni
- Elston Turner
- Corliss Williamson

Legend
- (DP) Unsigned draft pick
- (FA) Free agent
- (S) Suspended
- (GL) On assignment to G League affiliate
- (TW) Two-way affiliate player
- Injured

Roster
Updated: November 5, 2025

=== Oklahoma City Thunder ===
Oklahoma City Thunder roster
Players

Pos.	No.	Player	Height	Weight	DOB	From
G	23	Brooks Barnhizer (TW)	6 ft 6 in (1.98 m)	227 lb (103 kg)	2002-03-02	Northwestern
C	15	Branden Carlson (TW)	7 ft 0 in (2.13 m)	236 lb (107 kg)	1999-06-14	Utah
G	9	Alex Caruso	6 ft 5 in (1.96 m)	187 lb (85 kg)	1994-02-28	Texas A&M
F	13	Ousmane Dieng	6 ft 10 in (2.08 m)	223 lb (101 kg)	2003-05-21	France
G	5	Luguentz Dort	6 ft 4 in (1.93 m)	222 lb (101 kg)	1999-04-19	Arizona State
G	2	Shai Gilgeous-Alexander	6 ft 6 in (1.98 m)	200 lb (91 kg)	1998-07-12	Kentucky
F/C	55	Isaiah Hartenstein	7 ft 0 in (2.13 m)	267 lb (121 kg)	1998-05-05	Germany
F/C	7	Chet Holmgren	7 ft 1 in (2.16 m)	213 lb (97 kg)	2002-05-01	Gonzaga
G	11	Isaiah Joe	6 ft 5 in (1.96 m)	178 lb (81 kg)	1999-07-02	Arkansas
G	25	Ajay Mitchell	6 ft 4 in (1.93 m)	205 lb (93 kg)	2002-06-25	UC Santa Barbara
C	12	Thomas Sorber (injured)	6 ft 9 in (2.06 m)	268 lb (122 kg)	2005-12-25	Georgetown
G	44	Nikola Topić (injured)	6 ft 6 in (1.98 m)	218 lb (99 kg)	2005-08-10	Serbia
G	22	Cason Wallace	6 ft 4 in (1.93 m)	200 lb (91 kg)	2003-11-07	Kentucky
G	21	Aaron Wiggins	6 ft 6 in (1.98 m)	200 lb (91 kg)	1999-01-02	Maryland
F	8	Jalen Williams	6 ft 6 in (1.98 m)	220 lb (100 kg)	2001-04-14	Santa Clara
F	6	Jaylin Williams	6 ft 10 in (2.08 m)	241 lb (109 kg)	2002-06-29	Arkansas
G/F	34	Kenrich Williams	6 ft 7 in (2.01 m)	207 lb (94 kg)	1994-12-02	TCU
G	3	Chris Youngblood (TW)	6 ft 4 in (1.93 m)	221 lb (100 kg)	2002-09-02	Alabama

Coaches
Head coach
- Mark Daigneault
Assistant(s)
- David Akinyooye
- Dave Bliss
- Chip Engelland
- Grant Gibbs
- Connor Johnson
- Eric Maynor
- Zoe Vernon
- Mike Wilks
- Kameron Woods

Legend
- (DP) Unsigned draft pick
- (FA) Free agent
- (S) Suspended
- (GL) On assignment to G League affiliate
- (TW) Two-way affiliate player
- Injured

Roster
Updated: November 26, 2025

=== Portland Trail Blazers ===
Portland Trail Blazers roster
Players

Pos.	No.	Player	Height	Weight	DOB	From
F	8	Deni Avdija	6 ft 9 in (2.06 m)	240 lb (109 kg)	2001-01-03	Israel
F	33	Toumani Camara	6 ft 7 in (2.01 m)	229 lb (104 kg)	2000-05-08	Dayton
G	91	Sidy Cissoko (TW)	6 ft 6 in (1.98 m)	200 lb (91 kg)	2004-04-02	France
C	23	Donovan Clingan	7 ft 2 in (2.18 m)	280 lb (127 kg)	2004-02-23	Connecticut
F	9	Jerami Grant	6 ft 7 in (2.01 m)	210 lb (95 kg)	1994-03-12	Syracuse
G	00	Scoot Henderson	6 ft 3 in (1.91 m)	206 lb (93 kg)	2004-02-03	Carlton J. Kell HS (GA)
G	5	Jrue Holiday	6 ft 4 in (1.93 m)	185 lb (84 kg)	1990-06-12	UCLA
G	0	Damian Lillard (injured)	6 ft 2 in (1.88 m)	195 lb (88 kg)	1990-07-15	Weber State
G	2	Caleb Love (TW)	6 ft 4 in (1.93 m)	195 lb (88 kg)	2001-09-27	Arizona
F	24	Kris Murray	6 ft 8 in (2.03 m)	216 lb (98 kg)	2000-08-19	Iowa
C	26	Duop Reath	6 ft 9 in (2.06 m)	245 lb (111 kg)	1996-06-26	LSU
G/F	21	Rayan Rupert	6 ft 6 in (1.98 m)	195 lb (88 kg)	2004-05-31	France
G	17	Shaedon Sharpe	6 ft 5 in (1.96 m)	208 lb (94 kg)	2003-05-30	Dream City Christian (AZ)
G/F	4	Matisse Thybulle	6 ft 5 in (1.96 m)	201 lb (91 kg)	1997-03-04	Washington
F/C	35	Robert Williams III	6 ft 9 in (2.06 m)	249 lb (113 kg)	1997-10-17	Texas A&M
G	1	Blake Wesley	6 ft 3 in (1.91 m)	205 lb (93 kg)	2003-03-16	Notre Dame
C	16	Yang Hansen	7 ft 1 in (2.16 m)	249 lb (113 kg)	2005-06-26	China

Coaches
Head coach
- Chauncey Billups (on leave)
- Tiago Splitter (interim head coach)
Assistant(s)
- Nate Bjorkgren
- Ronnie Burrell
- Quinton Crawford
- Chris Fleming
- Jonah Herscu
- James Posey
- Roy Rogers
- Patrick St. Andrews
- Mark Tyndale

Legend
- (DP) Unsigned draft pick
- (FA) Free agent
- (S) Suspended
- (GL) On assignment to G League
- (TW) Two-way affiliate player
- Injured

Roster
Updated: July 17, 2025

=== Utah Jazz ===
Utah Jazz roster
Players

Pos.	No.	Player	Height	Weight	DOB	From
G/F	2	Kyle Anderson	6 ft 8 in (2.03 m)	230 lb (104 kg)	1993-09-20	UCLA
F	19	Ace Bailey	6 ft 9 in (2.06 m)	200 lb (91 kg)	2006-08-13	Rutgers
G	13	Walter Clayton Jr.	6 ft 4 in (1.93 m)	195 lb (88 kg)	2003-03-06	Florida
G	8	Isaiah Collier	6 ft 4 in (1.93 m)	210 lb (95 kg)	2004-10-08	USC
C	22	Kyle Filipowski	6 ft 11 in (2.11 m)	250 lb (113 kg)	2003-10-07	Duke
G	3	Keyonte George	6 ft 4 in (1.93 m)	185 lb (84 kg)	2003-11-08	Baylor
G	16	Elijah Harkless (TW)	6 ft 3 in (1.91 m)	195 lb (88 kg)	2000-02-03	UNLV
F	0	Taylor Hendricks	6 ft 9 in (2.06 m)	215 lb (98 kg)	2003-11-22	Central Florida
C	24	Walker Kessler (injured)	7 ft 2 in (2.18 m)	245 lb (111 kg)	2001-07-26	Auburn
F/C	42	Kevin Love	6 ft 10 in (2.08 m)	251 lb (114 kg)	1988-09-07	UCLA
F/C	23	Lauri Markkanen	7 ft 1 in (2.16 m)	240 lb (109 kg)	1997-05-22	Arizona
G/F	10	Sviatoslav Mykhailiuk	6 ft 7 in (2.01 m)	205 lb (93 kg)	1997-06-10	Kansas
F	31	Georges Niang	6 ft 6 in (1.98 m)	230 lb (104 kg)	1993-06-17	Iowa State
C	30	Jusuf Nurkić	6 ft 11 in (2.11 m)	290 lb (132 kg)	1994-08-23	Bosnia and Herzegovina
F	28	Brice Sensabaugh	6 ft 6 in (1.98 m)	235 lb (107 kg)	2003-10-30	Ohio State
G	17	John Tonje (TW)	6 ft 4 in (1.93 m)	218 lb (99 kg)	2001-04-23	Wisconsin
F/C	34	Oscar Tshiebwe (TW)	6 ft 8 in (2.03 m)	255 lb (116 kg)	1999-11-27	Kentucky
F	5	Cody Williams	6 ft 8 in (2.03 m)	190 lb (86 kg)	2004-11-20	Colorado

Coaches
Head coach
- Will Hardy
Assistant(s)
- Evan Bradds
- Chad Forcier
- Rick Higgins
- Chris Jones
- Scott Morrison
- Sean Sheldon
- Jason Terry
- Mike Williams

Legend
- (DP) Unsigned draft pick
- (FA) Free agent
- (S) Suspended
- (GL) On assignment to G League affiliate
- (TW) Two-way affiliate player
- Injured

Roster
Updated: October 17, 2025

== Pacific Division ==
=== Golden State Warriors ===
Golden State Warriors roster
Players

Pos.	No.	Player	Height	Weight	DOB	From
F	10	Jimmy Butler	6 ft 6 in (1.98 m)	230 lb (104 kg)	1989-09-14	Marquette
G	18	LJ Cryer (TW)	6 ft 0 in (1.83 m)	200 lb (91 kg)	2001-10-09	Houston
G	31	Seth Curry	6 ft 1 in (1.85 m)	185 lb (84 kg)	1990-08-23	Duke
G	30	Stephen Curry	6 ft 2 in (1.88 m)	185 lb (84 kg)	1988-03-14	Davidson
F	23	Draymond Green	6 ft 6 in (1.98 m)	230 lb (104 kg)	1990-03-04	Michigan State
G	7	Buddy Hield	6 ft 4 in (1.93 m)	220 lb (100 kg)	1992-12-17	Oklahoma
C	20	Al Horford	6 ft 8 in (2.03 m)	240 lb (109 kg)	1986-06-03	Florida
F	32	Trayce Jackson-Davis	6 ft 9 in (2.06 m)	245 lb (111 kg)	2000-02-22	Indiana
F	1	Jonathan Kuminga	6 ft 7 in (2.01 m)	225 lb (102 kg)	2002-10-06	The Patrick School (NJ)
F	33	Malevy Leons (TW)	6 ft 9 in (2.06 m)	210 lb (95 kg)	1999-09-23	Bradley
G	8	De'Anthony Melton	6 ft 2 in (1.88 m)	200 lb (91 kg)	1998-05-28	USC
G	4	Moses Moody	6 ft 5 in (1.96 m)	211 lb (96 kg)	2002-05-31	Arkansas
G	0	Gary Payton II	6 ft 2 in (1.88 m)	195 lb (88 kg)	1992-12-01	Oregon State
G	2	Brandin Podziemski	6 ft 4 in (1.93 m)	205 lb (93 kg)	2003-02-25	Santa Clara
C	21	Quinten Post	7 ft 0 in (2.13 m)	238 lb (108 kg)	2000-03-21	Boston College
G	3	Will Richard	6 ft 3 in (1.91 m)	206 lb (93 kg)	2002-12-24	Florida
F	15	Gui Santos	6 ft 7 in (2.01 m)	185 lb (84 kg)	2002-06-22	Brazil
G	61	Pat Spencer (TW)	6 ft 2 in (1.88 m)	205 lb (93 kg)	1996-07-04	Northwestern

Coaches
Head coach
- Steve Kerr
Assistant(s)
- Ron Adams
- Seth Cooper
- Bruce Fraser
- Nick Kerr
- Khalid Robinson
- Jacob Rubin
- Jerry Stackhouse
- Terry Stotts
- Anthony Vereen
- Kris Weems
- Drew Yoder

Legend
- (DP) Unsigned draft pick
- (FA) Free agent
- (S) Suspended
- (GL) On assignment to G League affiliate
- (TW) Two-way affiliate player
- Injured

Roster
Updated: December 17, 2025

=== Los Angeles Clippers ===
Los Angeles Clippers roster
Players

Pos.	No.	Player	Height	Weight	DOB	From
G/F	33	Nicolas Batum	6 ft 7 in (2.01 m)	230 lb (104 kg)	1988-12-14	France
G	0	Bradley Beal (injured)	6 ft 4 in (1.93 m)	207 lb (94 kg)	1993-06-28	Florida
G	10	Bogdan Bogdanović	6 ft 5 in (1.96 m)	225 lb (102 kg)	1992-08-18	Serbia
F	24	Kobe Brown	6 ft 7 in (2.01 m)	250 lb (113 kg)	2000-01-01	Missouri
G	12	Cam Christie	6 ft 5 in (1.96 m)	190 lb (86 kg)	2005-07-24	Minnesota
F/C	20	John Collins	6 ft 9 in (2.06 m)	226 lb (103 kg)	1997-09-23	Wake Forest
G	7	RayJ Dennis (TW)	6 ft 1 in (1.85 m)	180 lb (82 kg)	2001-03-30	Baylor
G	8	Kris Dunn	6 ft 3 in (1.91 m)	205 lb (93 kg)	1994-03-18	Providence
G	1	James Harden	6 ft 5 in (1.96 m)	220 lb (100 kg)	1989-08-26	Arizona State
F	5	Derrick Jones Jr. (injured)	6 ft 6 in (1.98 m)	210 lb (95 kg)	1997-02-15	UNLV
F	2	Kawhi Leonard (injured)	6 ft 6 in (1.98 m)	225 lb (102 kg)	1991-06-29	San Diego State
C	11	Brook Lopez	7 ft 1 in (2.16 m)	282 lb (128 kg)	1988-04-01	Stanford
G	22	Jordan Miller (TW)	6 ft 5 in (1.96 m)	194 lb (88 kg)	2000-01-23	Miami (FL)
C	14	Yanic Konan Niederhäuser	6 ft 11 in (2.11 m)	242 lb (110 kg)	2003-03-14	Penn State
G	3	Chris Paul	6 ft 0 in (1.83 m)	175 lb (79 kg)	1985-05-06	Wake Forest
G	4	Kobe Sanders (TW)	6 ft 8 in (2.03 m)	207 lb (94 kg)	2002-05-30	Nevada
C	40	Ivica Zubac	7 ft 0 in (2.13 m)	240 lb (109 kg)	1997-03-18	Croatia

Coaches
Head coach
- Tyronn Lue
Assistant(s)
- Jeremy Castleberry
- Larry Drew
- Shaun Fein
- Dahntay Jones
- Jay Larranaga
- Brian Shaw
- Jeff Van Gundy

Legend
- (DP) Unsigned draft pick
- (FA) Free agent
- (S) Suspended
- (GL) On assignment to G League affiliate
- (TW) Two-way affiliate player
- Injured

Roster
Updated: November 17, 2025

=== Los Angeles Lakers ===
Los Angeles Lakers roster
Players

Pos.	No.	Player	Height	Weight	DOB	From
C	5	Deandre Ayton	7 ft 0 in (2.13 m)	252 lb (114 kg)	1998-07-23	Arizona
G	77	Luka Dončić	6 ft 8 in (2.03 m)	230 lb (104 kg)	1999-02-28	Slovenia
F	28	Rui Hachimura	6 ft 8 in (2.03 m)	230 lb (104 kg)	1998-02-08	Gonzaga
F/C	11	Jaxson Hayes	7 ft 0 in (2.13 m)	220 lb (100 kg)	2000-05-23	Texas
G	9	Bronny James (GL)	6 ft 2 in (1.88 m)	210 lb (95 kg)	2004-10-06	USC
F	23	LeBron James	6 ft 9 in (2.06 m)	250 lb (113 kg)	1984-12-30	St. Vincent–St. Mary HS (OH)
F	14	Maxi Kleber	6 ft 10 in (2.08 m)	240 lb (109 kg)	1992-01-29	Germany
G/F	4	Dalton Knecht	6 ft 6 in (1.98 m)	215 lb (98 kg)	2001-04-19	Tennessee
F	12	Jake LaRavia	6 ft 7 in (2.01 m)	235 lb (107 kg)	2001-11-03	Wake Forest
G	30	Chris Mañon (TW)	6 ft 4 in (1.93 m)	209 lb (95 kg)	2001-12-09	Vanderbilt
G	15	Austin Reaves	6 ft 5 in (1.96 m)	197 lb (89 kg)	1998-05-29	Oklahoma
G	36	Marcus Smart	6 ft 3 in (1.91 m)	220 lb (100 kg)	1994-03-06	Oklahoma State
G	20	Nick Smith Jr. (TW)	6 ft 2 in (1.88 m)	185 lb (84 kg)	2004-04-18	Arkansas
F	1	Adou Thiero (GL)	6 ft 7 in (2.01 m)	220 lb (100 kg)	2004-05-08	Arkansas
F/C	17	Drew Timme (TW)	6 ft 9 in (2.06 m)	235 lb (107 kg)	2000-09-09	Gonzaga
F	2	Jarred Vanderbilt	6 ft 8 in (2.03 m)	214 lb (97 kg)	1999-04-03	Kentucky
G	7	Gabe Vincent	6 ft 2 in (1.88 m)	200 lb (91 kg)	1996-07-14	UC Santa Barbara

Coaches
Head coach
- JJ Redick
Assistant(s)
- Bob Beyer
- Scott Brooks
- Lindsey Harding
- Beau Levesque
- Nate McMillan
- Greg St. Jean

Legend
- (DP) Unsigned draft pick
- (FA) Free agent
- (S) Suspended
- (GL) On assignment to G League affiliate
- (TW) Two-way affiliate player
- (L) On leave from the team
- Injured

Roster
Updated: November 20, 2025

=== Phoenix Suns ===
Phoenix Suns roster
Players

Pos.	No.	Player	Height	Weight	DOB	From
G	8	Grayson Allen	6 ft 3 in (1.91 m)	198 lb (90 kg)	1995-10-08	Duke
G	1	Devin Booker (injured)	6 ft 5 in (1.96 m)	206 lb (93 kg)	1996-10-30	Kentucky
G	14	Koby Brea (TW)	6 ft 5 in (1.96 m)	215 lb (98 kg)	2002-11-06	Kentucky
G/F	3	Dillon Brooks	6 ft 7 in (2.01 m)	225 lb (102 kg)	1996-01-22	Oregon
F	0	Ryan Dunn	6 ft 7 in (2.01 m)	216 lb (98 kg)	2003-01-07	Virginia
F	20	Rasheer Fleming	6 ft 9 in (2.06 m)	240 lb (109 kg)	2004-07-10	Saint Joseph's
G	12	Collin Gillespie	6 ft 1 in (1.85 m)	195 lb (88 kg)	1999-06-25	Villanova
G	23	Jordan Goodwin	6 ft 3 in (1.91 m)	215 lb (98 kg)	1998-10-23	Saint Louis
G	4	Jalen Green (injured)	6 ft 4 in (1.93 m)	186 lb (84 kg)	2002-02-09	Prolific Prep (CA)
F	21	Nigel Hayes-Davis	6 ft 7 in (2.01 m)	254 lb (115 kg)	1994-12-16	Wisconsin
F	11	Oso Ighodaro	6 ft 11 in (2.11 m)	235 lb (107 kg)	2002-07-14	Marquette
F	18	Isaiah Livers (injured) (TW)	6 ft 6 in (1.98 m)	232 lb (105 kg)	1998-07-28	Michigan
C	10	Khaman Maluach	7 ft 1 in (2.16 m)	250 lb (113 kg)	2006-09-14	Duke
F	00	Royce O'Neale	6 ft 6 in (1.98 m)	226 lb (103 kg)	1993-06-05	Baylor
C	2	Nick Richards	6 ft 11 in (2.11 m)	245 lb (111 kg)	1997-11-29	Kentucky
C	15	Mark Williams	7 ft 1 in (2.16 m)	240 lb (109 kg)	2001-12-16	Duke

Coaches
Head coach
- Jordan Ott
Assistant(s)
- Chaisson Allen
- DeMarre Carroll
- Sean Dwyer
- John Little
- Jesse Mermuys
- Mike Muscala
- Brian Randle

Legend
- (DP) Unsigned draft pick
- (FA) Free agent
- (S) Suspended
- (GL) On assignment to G League affiliate
- (TW) Two-way affiliate player
- Injured

Roster
Updated: December 5, 2025

=== Sacramento Kings ===
Sacramento Kings roster
Players

Pos.	No.	Player	Height	Weight	DOB	From
C	32	Dylan Cardwell (TW)	6 ft 11 in (2.11 m)	255 lb (116 kg)	2001-12-16	Auburn
G	22	Devin Carter	6 ft 2 in (1.88 m)	195 lb (88 kg)	2002-03-18	Providence
G	5	Nique Clifford	6 ft 5 in (1.96 m)	175 lb (79 kg)	2002-02-09	Colorado State
G/F	10	DeMar DeRozan	6 ft 6 in (1.98 m)	220 lb (100 kg)	1989-08-07	USC
G	23	Keon Ellis	6 ft 4 in (1.93 m)	175 lb (79 kg)	2000-01-08	Alabama
F/C	19	Drew Eubanks	6 ft 10 in (2.08 m)	245 lb (111 kg)	1997-02-01	Oregon State
F	3	Isaac Jones	6 ft 9 in (2.06 m)	245 lb (111 kg)	2000-07-11	Washington State
G	8	Zach LaVine	6 ft 5 in (1.96 m)	200 lb (91 kg)	1995-03-10	UCLA
F	7	Doug McDermott	6 ft 6 in (1.98 m)	225 lb (102 kg)	1992-01-03	Creighton
G	0	Malik Monk	6 ft 3 in (1.91 m)	200 lb (91 kg)	1998-02-04	Kentucky
F	13	Keegan Murray	6 ft 8 in (2.03 m)	225 lb (102 kg)	2000-08-19	Iowa
G/F	29	Daeqwon Plowden (TW)	6 ft 6 in (1.98 m)	215 lb (98 kg)	1998-08-29	Bowling Green
C	42	Maxime Raynaud (GL)	7 ft 1 in (2.16 m)	250 lb (113 kg)	2003-04-07	Stanford
F/C	11	Domantas Sabonis	6 ft 10 in (2.08 m)	240 lb (109 kg)	1996-05-03	Gonzaga
F/C	20	Dario Šarić	6 ft 10 in (2.08 m)	225 lb (102 kg)	1994-04-08	Croatia
G	17	Dennis Schröder	6 ft 1 in (1.85 m)	175 lb (79 kg)	1993-09-15	Germany
G	24	Isaiah Stevens (TW)	6 ft 0 in (1.83 m)	185 lb (84 kg)	2000-11-01	Colorado State
G	18	Russell Westbrook	6 ft 4 in (1.93 m)	200 lb (91 kg)	1988-11-12	UCLA

Coaches
Head coach
- Doug Christie
Assistant(s)
- Mike Woodson (Associate HC)
- Leandro Barbosa
- Bobby Jackson
- Mike Miller
- Chris Darnell

Legend
- (DP) Unsigned draft pick
- (FA) Free agent
- (S) Suspended
- (GL) On assignment to G League affiliate
- (TW) Two-way affiliate player
- Injured

Roster
Updated: October 16, 2025

== Southwest Division ==
=== Dallas Mavericks ===
Dallas Mavericks roster
Players

Pos.	No.	Player	Height	Weight	DOB	From
G	00	Max Christie	6 ft 5 in (1.96 m)	190 lb (86 kg)	2003-02-10	Michigan State
C	30	Moussa Cissé (TW)	6 ft 11 in (2.11 m)	220 lb (100 kg)	2002-09-10	Memphis
F/C	3	Anthony Davis	6 ft 10 in (2.08 m)	253 lb (115 kg)	1993-03-11	Kentucky
G	0	Danté Exum (injured)	6 ft 5 in (1.96 m)	214 lb (97 kg)	1995-07-13	Australia
F	32	Cooper Flagg	6 ft 9 in (2.06 m)	205 lb (93 kg)	2006-12-21	Duke
F/C	21	Daniel Gafford (injured)	6 ft 10 in (2.08 m)	265 lb (120 kg)	1998-10-01	Arkansas
G	1	Jaden Hardy	6 ft 3 in (1.91 m)	198 lb (90 kg)	2002-07-05	Coronado HS (NV)
G	11	Kyrie Irving (injured)	6 ft 2 in (1.88 m)	195 lb (88 kg)	1992-03-23	Duke
G	14	Miles Kelly (TW)	6 ft 4 in (1.93 m)	190 lb (86 kg)	2003-01-26	Auburn
C	2	Dereck Lively II (injured)	7 ft 1 in (2.16 m)	230 lb (104 kg)	2004-02-12	Duke
F	13	Naji Marshall	6 ft 6 in (1.98 m)	220 lb (100 kg)	1998-01-24	Xavier
F	16	Caleb Martin	6 ft 5 in (1.96 m)	205 lb (93 kg)	1995-09-28	Nevada
G	9	Ryan Nembhard (TW)	5 ft 11 in (1.80 m)	180 lb (82 kg)	2003-03-10	Gonzaga
F/C	7	Dwight Powell	6 ft 10 in (2.08 m)	240 lb (109 kg)	1991-07-20	Stanford
G	5	D'Angelo Russell	6 ft 3 in (1.91 m)	193 lb (88 kg)	1996-02-23	Ohio State
G	31	Klay Thompson	6 ft 5 in (1.96 m)	220 lb (100 kg)	1990-02-08	Washington State
F	25	P. J. Washington	6 ft 7 in (2.01 m)	230 lb (104 kg)	1998-08-23	Kentucky
G	10	Brandon Williams	6 ft 1 in (1.85 m)	190 lb (86 kg)	1999-11-22	Arizona

Coaches
Head coach
- Jason Kidd
Assistant(s)
- Dru Anthrop
- Josh Broghamer
- Phil Handy
- Eric Hughes
- Popeye Jones
- Mike Penberthy
- Jordan Sears
- Jay Triano
- Keith Veney
- Frank Vogel (associate HC)

Legend
- (DP) Unsigned draft pick
- (FA) Free agent
- (S) Suspended
- (GL) On assignment to G League affiliate
- (TW) Two-way affiliate player
- Injured

Roster
Updated: November 15, 2025

=== Houston Rockets ===
Houston Rockets roster
Players

Pos.	No.	Player	Height	Weight	DOB	From
C	12	Steven Adams	6 ft 11 in (2.11 m)	265 lb (120 kg)	1993-07-20	Pittsburgh
C	30	Clint Capela	6 ft 10 in (2.08 m)	256 lb (116 kg)	1994-05-18	Switzerland
F	27	Isaiah Crawford (TW)	6 ft 6 in (1.98 m)	220 lb (100 kg)	2001-11-01	Louisiana Tech
G	4	JD Davison (TW)	6 ft 1 in (1.85 m)	195 lb (88 kg)	2002-10-03	Alabama
F	7	Kevin Durant	6 ft 11 in (2.11 m)	240 lb (109 kg)	1988-09-29	Texas
F	17	Tari Eason	6 ft 8 in (2.03 m)	215 lb (98 kg)	2001-05-10	LSU
F	2	Dorian Finney-Smith (injured)	6 ft 7 in (2.01 m)	220 lb (100 kg)	1993-05-04	Florida
F	32	Jeff Green	6 ft 8 in (2.03 m)	235 lb (107 kg)	1986-08-28	Georgetown
G	0	Aaron Holiday	6 ft 0 in (1.83 m)	185 lb (84 kg)	1996-09-30	UCLA
G	20	Josh Okogie	6 ft 4 in (1.93 m)	213 lb (97 kg)	1998-09-01	Georgia Tech
C	28	Alperen Şengün	6 ft 11 in (2.11 m)	243 lb (110 kg)	2002-07-25	Turkey
G	15	Reed Sheppard	6 ft 2 in (1.88 m)	185 lb (84 kg)	2004-06-24	Kentucky
F	21	Tyler Smith (TW)	6 ft 9 in (2.06 m)	224 lb (102 kg)	2004-11-02	George Bush (TX)
F	10	Jabari Smith Jr.	6 ft 11 in (2.11 m)	220 lb (100 kg)	2003-05-13	Auburn
F	8	Jae'Sean Tate	6 ft 4 in (1.93 m)	230 lb (104 kg)	1995-10-28	Ohio State
G/F	1	Amen Thompson	6 ft 7 in (2.01 m)	200 lb (91 kg)	2003-01-30	Pine Crest (FL)
G	5	Fred VanVleet (injured)	6 ft 0 in (1.83 m)	197 lb (89 kg)	1994-02-25	Wichita State

Coaches
Head coach
- Ime Udoka
Assistant(s)
- Josh Bostic
- Will Dunn
- Cam Hodges
- Royal Ivey
- Garrett Jackson
- Robbie Lemons
- Ben Sullivan

Legend
- (DP) Unsigned draft pick
- (FA) Free agent
- (S) Suspended
- (GL) On assignment to G League affiliate
- (TW) Two-way affiliate player
- Injured

Roster
Updated: December 21, 2025

=== Memphis Grizzlies ===
Memphis Grizzlies roster
Players

Pos.	No.	Player	Height	Weight	DOB	From
F/C	7	Santi Aldama	7 ft 0 in (2.13 m)	215 lb (98 kg)	2001-01-10	Loyola (MD)
G	3	Kentavious Caldwell-Pope	6 ft 5 in (1.96 m)	204 lb (93 kg)	1993-02-18	Georgia
F	15	Brandon Clarke (injured)	6 ft 8 in (2.03 m)	215 lb (98 kg)	1996-09-19	Gonzaga
G	23	Cedric Coward	6 ft 6 in (1.98 m)	206 lb (93 kg)	2003-09-11	Washington State
C	14	Zach Edey	7 ft 3 in (2.21 m)	305 lb (138 kg)	2002-05-14	Purdue
F	45	GG Jackson	6 ft 9 in (2.06 m)	210 lb (95 kg)	2004-12-17	South Carolina
F/C	8	Jaren Jackson Jr.	6 ft 10 in (2.08 m)	242 lb (110 kg)	1999-09-15	Michigan State
G/F	2	Ty Jerome	6 ft 5 in (1.96 m)	195 lb (88 kg)	1997-07-08	Virginia
G	46	John Konchar	6 ft 5 in (1.96 m)	210 lb (95 kg)	1996-03-22	Purdue Fort Wayne
C	31	Jock Landale	6 ft 11 in (2.11 m)	255 lb (116 kg)	1995-10-25	Saint Mary's
G	21	Jahmai Mashack (TW)	6 ft 4 in (1.93 m)	203 lb (92 kg)	2002-11-10	Tennessee
G	12	Ja Morant (injured)	6 ft 2 in (1.88 m)	174 lb (79 kg)	1999-08-10	Murray State
G	1	Scotty Pippen Jr. (injured)	6 ft 1 in (1.85 m)	170 lb (77 kg)	2000-11-10	Vanderbilt
F	18	Olivier-Maxence Prosper (injured) (TW)	6 ft 7 in (2.01 m)	230 lb (104 kg)	2002-07-03	Marquette
G	10	Javon Small (injured) (TW)	6 ft 3 in (1.91 m)	190 lb (86 kg)	2002-12-19	West Virginia
G	24	Cam Spencer	6 ft 4 in (1.93 m)	205 lb (93 kg)	2000-04-06	Connecticut
F	0	Jaylen Wells	6 ft 8 in (2.03 m)	205 lb (93 kg)	2003-08-26	Washington State
G	5	Vince Williams Jr.	6 ft 4 in (1.93 m)	205 lb (93 kg)	2000-08-30	VCU

Coaches
Head coach
- Tuomas Iisalo
Assistant(s)
- Joe Boylan
- Anthony Carter
- Jason March
- Patrick Mutombo
- Ryan Saunders (lead assistant)
- Erick Schmidt

Legend
- (DP) Unsigned draft pick
- (FA) Free agent
- (S) Suspended
- (GL) On assignment to G League affiliate
- (TW) Two-way affiliate player
- Injured

Roster
Updated: November 17, 2025

=== New Orleans Pelicans ===
New Orleans Pelicans roster
Players

Pos.	No.	Player	Height	Weight	DOB	From
G	23	Trey Alexander (TW)	6 ft 4 in (1.93 m)	180 lb (82 kg)	2003-05-02	Creighton
G	15	Jose Alvarado	6 ft 0 in (1.83 m)	179 lb (81 kg)	1998-04-12	Georgia Tech
G/F	41	Saddiq Bey	6 ft 7 in (2.01 m)	215 lb (98 kg)	1999-04-09	Villanova
C	4	Hunter Dickinson (TW)	7 ft 1 in (2.16 m)	255 lb (116 kg)	2000-11-25	Kansas
G	0	Jeremiah Fears	6 ft 4 in (1.93 m)	190 lb (86 kg)	2006-10-14	Oklahoma
G	24	Jordan Hawkins	6 ft 5 in (1.96 m)	190 lb (86 kg)	2002-04-29	Connecticut
F	2	Herbert Jones (injured)	6 ft 7 in (2.01 m)	206 lb (93 kg)	1998-10-06	Alabama
C	9	DeAndre Jordan	6 ft 11 in (2.11 m)	265 lb (120 kg)	1988-07-21	Texas A&M
F	55	Kevon Looney	6 ft 9 in (2.06 m)	222 lb (101 kg)	1996-02-06	UCLA
F/C	17	Karlo Matković	6 ft 10 in (2.08 m)	231 lb (105 kg)	2001-03-30	Croatia
G	11	Bryce McGowens (TW)	6 ft 6 in (1.98 m)	190 lb (86 kg)	2002-11-08	Nebraska
C	21	Yves Missi	6 ft 11 in (2.11 m)	235 lb (107 kg)	2004-05-14	Baylor
F	25	Trey Murphy III	6 ft 8 in (2.03 m)	206 lb (93 kg)	2000-06-18	Virginia
G	5	Dejounte Murray (injured)	6 ft 4 in (1.93 m)	180 lb (82 kg)	1996-09-19	Washington
G/F	14	Micah Peavy	6 ft 7 in (2.01 m)	215 lb (98 kg)	2001-07-16	Georgetown
G	3	Jordan Poole	6 ft 4 in (1.93 m)	194 lb (88 kg)	1999-06-19	Michigan
C	22	Derik Queen	6 ft 10 in (2.08 m)	250 lb (113 kg)	2004-11-27	Maryland
F	1	Zion Williamson (injured)	6 ft 6 in (1.98 m)	284 lb (129 kg)	2000-07-06	Duke

Coaches
Head coach
- James Borrego (Interim HC)
Assistant(s)
- Corey Brewer
- Jarron Collins
- Dan Geriot
- Casey Hill
- Darnell Lazare
- Jodie Meeks
- Aaron Miles

Legend
- (DP) Unsigned draft pick
- (FA) Free agent
- (S) Suspended
- (GL) On assignment to G League
- (TW) Two-way affiliate player
- Injured

Roster
Updated: November 15, 2025

=== San Antonio Spurs ===
San Antonio Spurs roster
Players

Pos.	No.	Player	Height	Weight	DOB	From
F	40	Harrison Barnes	6 ft 7 in (2.01 m)	225 lb (102 kg)	1992-05-30	North Carolina
C	18	Bismack Biyombo	6 ft 8 in (2.03 m)	255 lb (116 kg)	1992-08-28	Democratic Republic of the Congo
F	11	Carter Bryant	6 ft 8 in (2.03 m)	220 lb (100 kg)	2005-11-26	Arizona
G	5	Stephon Castle	6 ft 6 in (1.98 m)	215 lb (98 kg)	2004-11-01	Connecticut
F	30	Julian Champagnie	6 ft 7 in (2.01 m)	217 lb (98 kg)	2001-06-29	St. John's
G	4	De'Aaron Fox	6 ft 3 in (1.91 m)	185 lb (84 kg)	1997-12-20	Kentucky
G	2	Dylan Harper	6 ft 5 in (1.96 m)	215 lb (98 kg)	2006-03-02	Rutgers
F	55	Harrison Ingram (TW)	6 ft 5 in (1.96 m)	230 lb (104 kg)	2002-11-27	North Carolina
G/F	3	Keldon Johnson	6 ft 6 in (1.98 m)	220 lb (100 kg)	1999-10-11	Kentucky
F	25	David Jones García (TW)	6 ft 4 in (1.93 m)	210 lb (95 kg)	2001-11-24	Memphis
F/C	7	Luke Kornet	7 ft 1 in (2.16 m)	250 lb (113 kg)	1995-07-15	Vanderbilt
G	0	Jordan McLaughlin	5 ft 11 in (1.80 m)	185 lb (84 kg)	1996-04-09	USC
F/C	8	Kelly Olynyk	7 ft 0 in (2.13 m)	240 lb (109 kg)	1991-04-19	Gonzaga
F	10	Jeremy Sochan	6 ft 8 in (2.03 m)	230 lb (104 kg)	2003-05-20	Baylor
G/F	24	Devin Vassell	6 ft 5 in (1.96 m)	200 lb (91 kg)	2000-08-23	Florida State
F	43	Lindy Waters III	6 ft 5 in (1.96 m)	210 lb (95 kg)	1997-07-28	Oklahoma State
F/C	1	Victor Wembanyama	7 ft 5 in (2.26 m)	235 lb (107 kg)	2004-01-04	France

Coaches
Head coach
- Mitch Johnson
Assistant(s)
- Jimmy Baron
- Josh Brannon
- Brett Brown
- Scott King
- Tim Martin
- Matthew Nielsen
- Mike Noyes
- Sean Sweeney (associate HC)
- Corliss Williamson

Legend
- (DP) Unsigned draft pick
- (FA) Free agent
- (S) Suspended
- (GL) On assignment to G League affiliate
- (TW) Two-way affiliate player
- Injured

Roster
Updated: December 5, 2025

== See also ==
- List of current NBA Eastern Conference team rosters
- List of current NBA head coaches
- List of NBA general managers
- List of NBA team presidents
