= List of current NBA Eastern Conference team rosters =

Below is a list of current National Basketball Association (NBA) Eastern Conference team rosters. NBA rosters are limited to 15 players during the regular season, plus three players on two-way contracts, expanding each team's roster to 18 players maximum. Teams may carry up to 21 players during the offseason.

There are 15 teams in the Eastern Conference.

== Atlantic Division ==
=== Boston Celtics ===
Boston Celtics roster
Players

Pos.	No.	Player	Height	Weight	DOB	From
F	99	Chris Boucher	6 ft 8 in (2.03 m)	200 lb (91 kg)	1993-01-11	Oregon
G/F	7	Jaylen Brown	6 ft 6 in (1.98 m)	223 lb (101 kg)	1996-10-24	California
C	52	Luka Garza	6 ft 10 in (2.08 m)	243 lb (110 kg)	1998-12-27	Iowa
G	28	Hugo González	6 ft 6 in (1.98 m)	200 lb (91 kg)	2006-02-04	Spain
G/F	13	Ron Harper Jr. (TW)	6 ft 5 in (1.96 m)	233 lb (106 kg)	2000-04-12	Rutgers
F	30	Sam Hauser	6 ft 7 in (2.01 m)	217 lb (98 kg)	1997-12-08	Virginia
F	8	Josh Minott	6 ft 8 in (2.03 m)	205 lb (93 kg)	2002-11-25	Memphis
G	11	Payton Pritchard	6 ft 1 in (1.85 m)	195 lb (88 kg)	1998-01-28	Oregon
C	88	Neemias Queta	7 ft 0 in (2.13 m)	248 lb (112 kg)	1999-07-13	Utah State
G	55	Baylor Scheierman	6 ft 6 in (1.98 m)	205 lb (93 kg)	2000-09-26	Creighton
G	44	Max Shulga (TW)	6 ft 4 in (1.93 m)	210 lb (95 kg)	2002-06-25	VCU
G	4	Anfernee Simons	6 ft 3 in (1.91 m)	200 lb (91 kg)	1999-06-08	IMG Academy (FL)
G/F	0	Jayson Tatum (injured)	6 ft 8 in (2.03 m)	210 lb (95 kg)	1998-03-03	Duke
F	26	Xavier Tillman	6 ft 8 in (2.03 m)	245 lb (111 kg)	1999-01-12	Michigan State
G	27	Jordan Walsh	6 ft 6 in (1.98 m)	205 lb (93 kg)	2004-03-03	Arkansas
G	9	Derrick White	6 ft 4 in (1.93 m)	190 lb (86 kg)	1994-07-02	Colorado
F/C	77	Amari Williams (TW)	6 ft 11 in (2.11 m)	250 lb (113 kg)	2002-01-28	Kentucky

Coaches
Head coach
- Joe Mazzulla
Assistant(s)
- Sam Cassell
- Anthony Dobbins
- Amile Jefferson
- Craig Luschenat
- D. J. MacLeay
- Ross McMains
- Matt Reynolds

Legend
- (DP) Unsigned draft pick
- (FA) Free agent
- (S) Suspended
- (GL) On assignment to G League affiliate
- (TW) Two-way affiliate player
- Injured

Roster
Updated: October 15, 2025

=== Brooklyn Nets ===
Brooklyn Nets roster
Players

Pos.	No.	Player	Height	Weight	DOB	From
C	33	Nic Claxton	6 ft 11 in (2.11 m)	215 lb (98 kg)	1999-04-17	Georgia
F/C	21	Noah Clowney	6 ft 10 in (2.08 m)	210 lb (95 kg)	2004-07-14	Alabama
G	8	Egor Demin	6 ft 8 in (2.03 m)	200 lb (91 kg)	2006-03-03	BYU
G	10	Tyson Etienne (TW)	6 ft 0 in (1.83 m)	200 lb (91 kg)	1999-09-17	Wichita State
F	7	Haywood Highsmith	6 ft 5 in (1.96 m)	220 lb (100 kg)	1996-12-09	Wheeling
F	9	E. J. Liddell (TW)	6 ft 6 in (1.98 m)	240 lb (109 kg)	2000-12-18	Ohio State
G/F	14	Terance Mann	6 ft 6 in (1.98 m)	215 lb (98 kg)	1996-10-18	Florida State
G	13	Tyrese Martin	6 ft 6 in (1.98 m)	215 lb (98 kg)	1999-03-07	Connecticut
F	17	Michael Porter Jr.	6 ft 10 in (2.08 m)	218 lb (99 kg)	1998-06-29	Missouri
G/F	4	Drake Powell	6 ft 5 in (1.96 m)	195 lb (88 kg)	2005-09-08	North Carolina
G	77	Ben Saraf	6 ft 6 in (1.98 m)	200 lb (91 kg)	2006-04-14	Israel
C	20	Day'Ron Sharpe	6 ft 10 in (2.08 m)	265 lb (120 kg)	2001-11-06	North Carolina
G	24	Cam Thomas	6 ft 3 in (1.91 m)	210 lb (95 kg)	2001-10-13	LSU
G	88	Nolan Traoré (GL)	6 ft 3 in (1.91 m)	185 lb (84 kg)	2006-05-28	France
F	1	Ziaire Williams	6 ft 9 in (2.06 m)	185 lb (84 kg)	2001-09-12	Stanford
F	22	Jalen Wilson	6 ft 6 in (1.98 m)	220 lb (100 kg)	2000-11-04	Kansas
F	2	Danny Wolf (GL)	6 ft 11 in (2.11 m)	250 lb (113 kg)	2004-05-05	Michigan

Coaches
Head coach
- Jordi Fernández
Assistant(s)
- Travis Bader
- Deividas Dulkys
- Ryan Forehan-Kelly
- Dutch Gaitley
- Connor Griffin
- Jay Hernandez
- Steve Hetzel
- Juwan Howard
- Corey Vinson

Legend
- (DP) Unsigned draft pick
- (FA) Free agent
- (S) Suspended
- (GL) On assignment to G League affiliate
- (TW) Two-way affiliate player
- Injured

Roster
Updated: November 20, 2025

=== New York Knicks ===
New York Knicks roster
Players

Pos.	No.	Player	Height	Weight	DOB	From
G/F	8	OG Anunoby	6 ft 7 in (2.01 m)	240 lb (109 kg)	1997-07-17	Indiana
G/F	25	Mikal Bridges	6 ft 6 in (1.98 m)	209 lb (95 kg)	1996-08-30	Villanova
G	11	Jalen Brunson	6 ft 2 in (1.88 m)	190 lb (86 kg)	1996-08-31	Villanova
G	00	Jordan Clarkson	6 ft 5 in (1.96 m)	194 lb (88 kg)	1992-06-07	Missouri
F	4	Pacôme Dadiet (GL)	6 ft 8 in (2.03 m)	210 lb (95 kg)	2005-07-27	France
F	51	Mohamed Diawara (GL)	6 ft 9 in (2.06 m)	225 lb (102 kg)	2005-04-29	France
F	20	Tosan Evbuomwan (TW)	6 ft 7 in (2.01 m)	217 lb (98 kg)	2001-02-16	Princeton
G	3	Josh Hart	6 ft 5 in (1.96 m)	215 lb (98 kg)	1995-03-06	Villanova
C	55	Ariel Hukporti	7 ft 0 in (2.13 m)	246 lb (112 kg)	2002-04-12	Germany
C	50	Trey Jemison (TW)	6 ft 11 in (2.11 m)	260 lb (118 kg)	1999-11-28	UAB
G	13	Tyler Kolek (GL)	6 ft 2 in (1.88 m)	195 lb (88 kg)	2001-03-27	Marquette
G	2	Miles McBride	6 ft 2 in (1.88 m)	195 lb (88 kg)	2000-09-08	West Virginia
G	9	Kevin McCullar Jr. (TW)	6 ft 6 in (1.98 m)	210 lb (95 kg)	2001-03-15	Kansas
F/C	23	Mitchell Robinson	7 ft 0 in (2.13 m)	240 lb (109 kg)	1998-04-01	Chalmette HS (LA)
G	44	Landry Shamet	6 ft 5 in (1.96 m)	190 lb (86 kg)	1997-03-13	Wichita State
F/C	32	Karl-Anthony Towns	7 ft 0 in (2.13 m)	248 lb (112 kg)	1995-11-15	Kentucky
F	28	Guerschon Yabusele	6 ft 7 in (2.01 m)	265 lb (120 kg)	1995-12-17	France

Coaches
Head coach
- Mike Brown
Assistant(s)
- Charles Allen
- Rick Brunson
- Mark Bryant
- Maurice Cheeks
- Darren Erman
- Riccardo Fois
- Chris Jent (associate HC)
- Billy Lange
- Brendan O'Connor

Legend
- (DP) Unsigned draft pick
- (FA) Free agent
- (S) Suspended
- (GL) On assignment to G League affiliate
- (TW) Two-way affiliate player
- Injured

Roster
Updated: November 12, 2025

=== Philadelphia 76ers ===
Philadelphia 76ers roster
Players

Pos.	No.	Player	Height	Weight	DOB	From
F	25	Dominick Barlow (injured) (TW)	6 ft 9 in (2.06 m)	215 lb (98 kg)	2003-05-26	Saint Joseph's
F/C	30	Adem Bona	6 ft 10 in (2.08 m)	235 lb (107 kg)	2003-03-28	UCLA
F	22	Johni Broome (injured)	6 ft 10 in (2.08 m)	235 lb (107 kg)	2002-07-19	Auburn
C	1	Andre Drummond	6 ft 11 in (2.11 m)	279 lb (127 kg)	1993-08-10	Connecticut
G	77	V. J. Edgecombe	6 ft 4 in (1.93 m)	180 lb (82 kg)	2005-07-30	Baylor
F	11	Justin Edwards	6 ft 7 in (2.01 m)	203 lb (92 kg)	2003-12-16	Kentucky
C	21	Joel Embiid (injured)	7 ft 0 in (2.13 m)	280 lb (127 kg)	1994-03-16	Kansas
F	8	Paul George (injured)	6 ft 8 in (2.03 m)	220 lb (100 kg)	1990-05-02	Fresno State
G	23	Eric Gordon	6 ft 3 in (1.91 m)	215 lb (98 kg)	1988-12-25	Indiana
G	5	Quentin Grimes	6 ft 4 in (1.93 m)	210 lb (95 kg)	2000-05-08	Houston
G	7	Kyle Lowry	6 ft 0 in (1.83 m)	196 lb (89 kg)	1986-03-25	Villanova
G	0	Tyrese Maxey	6 ft 2 in (1.88 m)	200 lb (91 kg)	2000-10-04	Kentucky
G	20	Jared McCain	6 ft 3 in (1.91 m)	195 lb (88 kg)	2004-02-20	Duke
G/F	9	Kelly Oubre Jr.	6 ft 8 in (2.03 m)	203 lb (92 kg)	1995-12-09	Kansas
G	45	Hunter Sallis (TW)	6 ft 4 in (1.93 m)	185 lb (84 kg)	2003-03-26	Wake Forest
F	33	Jabari Walker (TW)	6 ft 7 in (2.01 m)	237 lb (108 kg)	2002-07-30	Colorado
F	12	Trendon Watford	6 ft 8 in (2.03 m)	237 lb (108 kg)	2000-11-09	LSU

Coaches
Head coach
- Nick Nurse
Assistant(s)
- Matt Brase
- Fabulous Flournoy
- Bryan Gates
- Rico Hines
- Coby Karl
- Mike Longabardi
- Doug West

Legend
- (DP) Unsigned draft pick
- (FA) Free agent
- (S) Suspended
- (GL) On assignment to G League affiliate
- (TW) Two-way affiliate player
- Injured

Roster
Updated: November 11, 2025

=== Toronto Raptors ===
Toronto Raptors roster
Players

Pos.	No.	Player	Height	Weight	DOB	From
G	30	Ochai Agbaji	6 ft 5 in (1.96 m)	215 lb (98 kg)	2000-04-20	Kansas
G/F	4	Scottie Barnes	6 ft 7 in (2.01 m)	237 lb (108 kg)	2001-08-01	Florida State
G/F	9	RJ Barrett	6 ft 6 in (1.98 m)	214 lb (97 kg)	2000-06-14	Duke
F	77	Jamison Battle	6 ft 7 in (2.01 m)	220 lb (100 kg)	2001-05-10	Ohio State
G/F	1	Gradey Dick	6 ft 6 in (1.98 m)	200 lb (91 kg)	2003-11-20	Kansas
G	24	Chucky Hepburn (TW)	6 ft 2 in (1.88 m)	190 lb (86 kg)	2003-02-09	Louisville
F	3	Brandon Ingram	6 ft 8 in (2.03 m)	190 lb (86 kg)	1997-09-02	Duke
G	0	A. J. Lawson (TW)	6 ft 6 in (1.98 m)	179 lb (81 kg)	2000-07-15	South Carolina
F/C	54	Sandro Mamukelashvili	6 ft 9 in (2.06 m)	240 lb (109 kg)	1999-05-23	Seton Hall
G	55	Alijah Martin (TW)	6 ft 2 in (1.88 m)	210 lb (95 kg)	2001-12-06	Florida
F	2	Jonathan Mogbo	6 ft 9 in (2.06 m)	225 lb (102 kg)	2001-10-29	San Francisco
F	12	Collin Murray-Boyles	6 ft 7 in (2.01 m)	245 lb (111 kg)	2005-06-10	South Carolina
C	19	Jakob Pöltl	7 ft 0 in (2.13 m)	260 lb (118 kg)	1995-10-15	Utah
G	5	Immanuel Quickley	6 ft 2 in (1.88 m)	190 lb (86 kg)	1999-06-17	Kentucky
G	23	Jamal Shead	6 ft 1 in (1.85 m)	200 lb (91 kg)	2002-07-24	Houston
G/F	17	Garrett Temple	6 ft 5 in (1.96 m)	195 lb (88 kg)	1986-05-08	LSU
G	14	Ja'Kobe Walter	6 ft 5 in (1.96 m)	180 lb (82 kg)	2004-09-04	Baylor

Coaches
Head coach
- Darko Rajaković
Assistant(s)
- Mery Andrade
- Michael Batiste
- Vin Bhavnani
- Pat Delany
- Eric Khoury
- Jama Mahlalela
- Jim Sann
- Ivo Simović
- James Wade

Legend
- (DP) Unsigned draft pick
- (FA) Free agent
- (S) Suspended
- (GL) On assignment to G League affiliate
- (TW) Two-way affiliate player
- Injured

Roster
Updated: October 16, 2025

== Central Division ==
=== Chicago Bulls ===
Chicago Bulls roster
Players

Pos.	No.	Player	Height	Weight	DOB	From
F	14	Matas Buzelis	6 ft 8 in (2.03 m)	209 lb (95 kg)	2004-10-13	Sunrise Christian (KS)
G	5	Jevon Carter	6 ft 0 in (1.83 m)	200 lb (91 kg)	1995-09-14	West Virginia
F/C	12	Zach Collins	6 ft 9 in (2.06 m)	250 lb (113 kg)	1997-11-19	Gonzaga
G	11	Ayo Dosunmu	6 ft 4 in (1.93 m)	200 lb (91 kg)	2000-01-17	Illinois
F	24	Noa Essengue	6 ft 8 in (2.03 m)	200 lb (91 kg)	2006-12-18	France
F	00	Trentyn Flowers (TW)	6 ft 9 in (2.06 m)	185 lb (84 kg)	2005-03-08	Combine Academy (NC)
G	3	Josh Giddey	6 ft 7 in (2.01 m)	216 lb (98 kg)	2002-10-10	Australia
G/F	13	Kevin Huerter	6 ft 6 in (1.98 m)	198 lb (90 kg)	1998-08-27	Maryland
G	30	Tre Jones	6 ft 1 in (1.85 m)	185 lb (84 kg)	2000-01-08	Duke
F	2	Emanuel Miller (TW)	6 ft 5 in (1.96 m)	215 lb (98 kg)	2000-06-19	TCU
G/F	35	Isaac Okoro	6 ft 4 in (1.93 m)	225 lb (102 kg)	2001-01-26	Auburn
C	47	Lachlan Olbrich (TW)	6 ft 8 in (2.03 m)	236 lb (107 kg)	2003-12-30	Australia
F	15	Julian Phillips	6 ft 6 in (1.98 m)	198 lb (90 kg)	2003-11-05	Tennessee
F/C	25	Jalen Smith	6 ft 8 in (2.03 m)	215 lb (98 kg)	2000-03-16	Maryland
F	7	Dalen Terry	6 ft 6 in (1.98 m)	195 lb (88 kg)	2002-07-12	Arizona
C	9	Nikola Vučević	6 ft 9 in (2.06 m)	260 lb (118 kg)	1990-10-24	USC
G	0	Coby White	6 ft 4 in (1.93 m)	195 lb (88 kg)	2000-02-16	North Carolina
F	44	Patrick Williams	6 ft 6 in (1.98 m)	215 lb (98 kg)	2001-08-26	Florida State

Coaches
Head coach
- Billy Donovan
Assistant(s)
- John Bryant
- Damian Cotter
- Dan Craig
- Henry Domercant
- Billy Schmidt
- Wes Unseld Jr.

Legend
- (DP) Unsigned draft pick
- (FA) Free agent
- (S) Suspended
- (GL) On assignment to G League affiliate
- (TW) Two-way affiliate player
- Injured

Roster
Updated: October 18, 2025

=== Cleveland Cavaliers ===
Cleveland Cavaliers roster
Players

Pos.	No.	Player	Height	Weight	DOB	From
C	31	Jarrett Allen	6 ft 9 in (2.06 m)	243 lb (110 kg)	1998-04-21	Texas
G	2	Lonzo Ball	6 ft 5 in (1.96 m)	190 lb (86 kg)	1997-10-27	UCLA
C	3	Thomas Bryant	6 ft 9 in (2.06 m)	248 lb (112 kg)	1997-07-31	Indiana
G	10	Darius Garland	6 ft 1 in (1.85 m)	192 lb (87 kg)	2000-01-26	Vanderbilt
G/F	12	De'Andre Hunter	6 ft 7 in (2.01 m)	221 lb (100 kg)	1997-12-02	Virginia
F	8	Chris Livingston (TW)	6 ft 6 in (1.98 m)	220 lb (100 kg)	2003-10-15	Kentucky
G	5	Sam Merrill	6 ft 4 in (1.93 m)	205 lb (93 kg)	1996-05-15	Utah State
G	45	Donovan Mitchell	6 ft 2 in (1.88 m)	215 lb (98 kg)	1996-09-07	Louisville
C	4	Evan Mobley (injured)	6 ft 11 in (2.11 m)	215 lb (98 kg)	2001-06-18	USC
F/C	22	Larry Nance Jr. (injured)	6 ft 6 in (1.98 m)	245 lb (111 kg)	1993-01-01	Wyoming
G	9	Craig Porter Jr.	6 ft 1 in (1.85 m)	180 lb (82 kg)	2000-02-26	Wichita State
G	24	Tyrese Proctor	6 ft 4 in (1.93 m)	185 lb (84 kg)	2004-04-01	Duke
G/F	1	Max Strus (injured)	6 ft 5 in (1.96 m)	215 lb (98 kg)	1996-03-28	DePaul
F	35	Nae'Qwan Tomlin (TW)	6 ft 8 in (2.03 m)	210 lb (95 kg)	2000-12-10	Memphis
F	33	Luke Travers (TW)	6 ft 6 in (1.98 m)	207 lb (94 kg)	2001-09-03	Australia
G/F	20	Jaylon Tyson	6 ft 6 in (1.98 m)	215 lb (98 kg)	2002-12-02	California
F/C	32	Dean Wade	6 ft 9 in (2.06 m)	228 lb (103 kg)	1996-11-20	Kansas State

Coaches
Head coach
- Kenny Atkinson
Assistant(s)
- Johnnie Bryant (associate HC)
- Omar Cook
- Mike Gerrity
- Trevor Hendry
- Andrew Olson
- Nate Reinking
- Alex Sarama
- Jawad Williams

Legend
- (DP) Unsigned draft pick
- (FA) Free agent
- (S) Suspended
- (GL) On assignment to G League affiliate
- (TW) Two-way affiliate player
- Injured

Roster
Updated: November 19, 2025

=== Detroit Pistons ===
Detroit Pistons roster
Players

Pos.	No.	Player	Height	Weight	DOB	From
G	2	Cade Cunningham	6 ft 6 in (1.98 m)	220 lb (100 kg)	2001-09-25	Oklahoma State
C	0	Jalen Duren	6 ft 10 in (2.08 m)	250 lb (113 kg)	2003-11-18	Memphis
F	31	Javonte Green	6 ft 5 in (1.96 m)	205 lb (93 kg)	1993-07-23	Radford
F	12	Tobias Harris	6 ft 8 in (2.03 m)	226 lb (103 kg)	1992-07-15	Tennessee
F	5	Ron Holland	6 ft 8 in (2.03 m)	206 lb (93 kg)	2005-07-07	Duncanville HS (TX)
G	23	Jaden Ivey	6 ft 3 in (1.91 m)	195 lb (88 kg)	2002-02-13	Purdue
G	24	Daniss Jenkins (TW)	6 ft 4 in (1.93 m)	165 lb (75 kg)	2001-08-17	St. John's
F	13	Isaac Jones	6 ft 9 in (2.06 m)	245 lb (111 kg)	2000-07-11	Washington State
F	34	Bobi Klintman	6 ft 9 in (2.06 m)	225 lb (102 kg)	2003-03-06	Wake Forest
G	20	Chaz Lanier	6 ft 3 in (1.91 m)	206 lb (93 kg)	2001-12-19	Tennessee
G	8	Caris LeVert	6 ft 7 in (2.01 m)	205 lb (93 kg)	1994-08-25	Michigan
G/F	14	Wendell Moore Jr. (TW)	6 ft 5 in (1.96 m)	215 lb (98 kg)	2001-09-18	Duke
F	7	Paul Reed	6 ft 9 in (2.06 m)	210 lb (95 kg)	1999-06-26	DePaul
F	55	Duncan Robinson	6 ft 7 in (2.01 m)	215 lb (98 kg)	1994-04-22	Michigan
G	25	Marcus Sasser	6 ft 1 in (1.85 m)	195 lb (88 kg)	2000-09-21	Houston
F	35	Tolu Smith (TW)	6 ft 11 in (2.11 m)	245 lb (111 kg)	2001-07-26	Mississippi State
F/C	28	Isaiah Stewart	6 ft 8 in (2.03 m)	250 lb (113 kg)	2001-05-22	Washington
G/F	9	Ausar Thompson	6 ft 7 in (2.01 m)	205 lb (93 kg)	2003-01-30	Pine Crest (FL)

Coaches
Head coach
- J. B. Bickerstaff
Assistant(s)
- Jerome Allen
- Kevin Burleson
- Josh Estes
- Jarrett Jack
- Sidney Lowe
- Vitaly Potapenko
- Steve Scalzi
- Fred Vinson
- Luke Walton

Legend
- (DP) Unsigned draft pick
- (FA) Free agent
- (S) Suspended
- (GL) On assignment to G League affiliate
- (TW) Two-way affiliate player
- Injured

Roster
Updated: November 10, 2025

=== Indiana Pacers ===
Indiana Pacers roster
Players

Pos.	No.	Player	Height	Weight	DOB	From
C	13	Tony Bradley (injured)	6 ft 10 in (2.08 m)	248 lb (112 kg)	1998-01-08	North Carolina
G	10	RayJ Dennis (TW)	6 ft 1 in (1.85 m)	180 lb (82 kg)	2001-03-30	Baylor
G	12	Johnny Furphy	6 ft 8 in (2.03 m)	200 lb (91 kg)	2004-12-08	Kansas
G	0	Tyrese Haliburton (injured)	6 ft 5 in (1.96 m)	185 lb (84 kg)	2000-02-29	Iowa State
C	32	Jay Huff	7 ft 1 in (2.16 m)	240 lb (109 kg)	1997-08-25	Virginia
F	22	Isaiah Jackson	6 ft 8 in (2.03 m)	205 lb (93 kg)	2002-01-10	Kentucky
G	29	Quenton Jackson (TW)	6 ft 4 in (1.93 m)	173 lb (78 kg)	1998-09-15	Texas A&M
G	7	Kam Jones	6 ft 4 in (1.93 m)	200 lb (91 kg)	2002-02-25	Marquette
G	24	Garrison Mathews	6 ft 5 in (1.96 m)	215 lb (98 kg)	1996-10-24	Lipscomb
G/F	00	Bennedict Mathurin	6 ft 5 in (1.96 m)	210 lb (95 kg)	2002-06-19	Arizona
G	9	T. J. McConnell	6 ft 1 in (1.85 m)	190 lb (86 kg)	1992-03-25	Arizona
G	2	Andrew Nembhard	6 ft 4 in (1.93 m)	191 lb (87 kg)	2000-01-16	Gonzaga
F	23	Aaron Nesmith (injured)	6 ft 5 in (1.96 m)	215 lb (98 kg)	1999-10-16	Vanderbilt
G	4	Taelon Peter (TW)	6 ft 3 in (1.91 m)	185 lb (84 kg)	2002-02-27	Liberty
G	26	Ben Sheppard (injured)	6 ft 6 in (1.98 m)	190 lb (86 kg)	2001-07-16	Belmont
F	43	Pascal Siakam	6 ft 8 in (2.03 m)	245 lb (111 kg)	1994-04-02	New Mexico State
F	1	Obi Toppin (injured)	6 ft 9 in (2.06 m)	220 lb (100 kg)	1998-03-04	Dayton
F	5	Jarace Walker	6 ft 7 in (2.01 m)	235 lb (107 kg)	2003-09-04	Houston
C	11	James Wiseman	6 ft 11 in (2.11 m)	240 lb (109 kg)	2001-03-31	Memphis

Coaches
Head coach
- Rick Carlisle
Assistant(s)
- Maurice Baker
- Jenny Boucek
- Jim Boylen
- Johnny Carpenter
- Jannero Pargo
- Lloyd Pierce
- Isaac Yacob

Legend
- (DP) Unsigned draft pick
- (FA) Free agent
- (S) Suspended
- (GL) On assignment to G League affiliate
- (TW) Two-way affiliate player
- Injured

Roster
Updated: November 21, 2025

=== Milwaukee Bucks ===
Milwaukee Bucks roster
Players

Pos.	No.	Player	Height	Weight	DOB	From
F	29	Alex Antetokounmpo (TW)	6 ft 8 in (2.03 m)	214 lb (97 kg)	2001-08-27	Greece
F	34	Giannis Antetokounmpo (injured)	6 ft 11 in (2.11 m)	243 lb (110 kg)	1994-12-06	Greece
F	43	Thanasis Antetokounmpo	6 ft 7 in (2.01 m)	219 lb (99 kg)	1992-07-18	Greece
G	50	Cole Anthony	6 ft 2 in (1.88 m)	185 lb (84 kg)	2000-05-15	North Carolina
F	17	Amir Coffey	6 ft 7 in (2.01 m)	210 lb (95 kg)	1997-06-17	Minnesota
G	20	A. J. Green	6 ft 4 in (1.93 m)	190 lb (86 kg)	1999-09-27	Northern Iowa
G	11	Gary Harris	6 ft 4 in (1.93 m)	210 lb (95 kg)	1994-09-14	Michigan State
G	44	Andre Jackson Jr.	6 ft 6 in (1.98 m)	209 lb (95 kg)	2001-11-13	Connecticut
F	18	Kyle Kuzma	6 ft 8 in (2.03 m)	221 lb (100 kg)	1995-07-24	Utah
F	35	Pete Nance (TW)	6 ft 9 in (2.06 m)	225 lb (102 kg)	2000-02-19	North Carolina
G	7	Kevin Porter Jr.	6 ft 5 in (1.96 m)	203 lb (92 kg)	2000-05-04	USC
F	9	Bobby Portis	6 ft 9 in (2.06 m)	250 lb (113 kg)	1995-02-10	Arkansas
F	12	Taurean Prince	6 ft 6 in (1.98 m)	218 lb (99 kg)	1994-03-22	Baylor
G	13	Ryan Rollins	6 ft 3 in (1.91 m)	180 lb (82 kg)	2002-07-03	Toledo
G	19	Mark Sears (TW)	6 ft 0 in (1.83 m)	190 lb (86 kg)	2002-02-19	Alabama
C	00	Jericho Sims	6 ft 10 in (2.08 m)	250 lb (113 kg)	1998-10-20	Texas
G	5	Gary Trent Jr.	6 ft 5 in (1.96 m)	204 lb (93 kg)	1999-01-18	Duke
C	3	Myles Turner	6 ft 11 in (2.11 m)	250 lb (113 kg)	1996-03-24	Texas

Coaches
Head coach
- Doc Rivers
Assistant(s)
- Vin Baker
- Greg Buckner
- Pete Dominguez
- Darvin Ham
- Jack Herum
- Dave Joerger
- Rex Kalamian
- Jason Love
- Spencer Rivers

Legend
- (DP) Unsigned draft pick
- (FA) Free agent
- (S) Suspended
- (GL) On assignment to G League affiliate
- (TW) Two-way affiliate player
- Injured

Roster
Updated: November 18, 2025

== Southeast Division ==
=== Atlanta Hawks ===
Atlanta Hawks roster
Players

Pos.	No.	Player	Height	Weight	DOB	From
F	7	Nickeil Alexander-Walker	6 ft 5 in (1.96 m)	205 lb (93 kg)	1998-09-02	Virginia Tech
G	5	Dyson Daniels	6 ft 7 in (2.01 m)	199 lb (90 kg)	2003-03-17	Australia
C	12	N'Faly Dante	6 ft 11 in (2.11 m)	230 lb (104 kg)	2001-10-19	Oregon
F	22	Nikola Đurišić	6 ft 8 in (2.03 m)	214 lb (97 kg)	2004-02-23	Serbia
F	18	Mouhamed Gueye	6 ft 11 in (2.11 m)	210 lb (95 kg)	2002-11-09	Washington State
F	33	Caleb Houstan (TW)	6 ft 8 in (2.03 m)	205 lb (93 kg)	2003-01-09	Michigan
F	1	Jalen Johnson	6 ft 8 in (2.03 m)	219 lb (99 kg)	2001-12-18	Duke
G	3	Luke Kennard	6 ft 5 in (1.96 m)	206 lb (93 kg)	1996-06-24	Duke
G	27	Vít Krejčí	6 ft 8 in (2.03 m)	195 lb (88 kg)	2000-06-19	Czech Republic
F	30	Eli Ndiaye (TW)	6 ft 8 in (2.03 m)	209 lb (95 kg)	2004-06-26	Senegal
F	14	Asa Newell	6 ft 10 in (2.08 m)	220 lb (100 kg)	2005-10-05	Georgia
F/C	17	Onyeka Okongwu	6 ft 10 in (2.08 m)	240 lb (109 kg)	2000-12-11	USC
F/C	8	Kristaps Porziņģis	7 ft 2 in (2.18 m)	240 lb (109 kg)	1995-08-02	Latvia
F	10	Zaccharie Risacher	6 ft 8 in (2.03 m)	200 lb (91 kg)	2005-04-08	France
G	2	Keaton Wallace	6 ft 3 in (1.91 m)	185 lb (84 kg)	1999-02-26	UTSA
G	11	Trae Young	6 ft 2 in (1.88 m)	164 lb (74 kg)	1998-09-19	Oklahoma

Coaches
Head coach
- Quin Snyder
Assistant(s)
- Bryan Bailey
- Mike Brey
- Brittni Donaldson
- Steve Klei
- Igor Kokoškov
- Antonio Lang
- Sanjay Lumpkin
- Ronald Nored
- Reggis Onwukamuche
- Ryan Schmidt
- Ekpe Udoh
- Jett Watkinson

Legend
- (DP) Unsigned draft pick
- (FA) Free agent
- (S) Suspended
- (GL) On assignment to G League affiliate
- (TW) Two-way affiliate player
- Injured

Roster
Updated: December 15, 2025

=== Charlotte Hornets ===
Charlotte Hornets roster
Players

Pos.	No.	Player	Height	Weight	DOB	From
G	1	LaMelo Ball	6 ft 7 in (2.01 m)	180 lb (82 kg)	2001-08-22	SPIRE Academy (OH)
F	0	Miles Bridges	6 ft 7 in (2.01 m)	225 lb (102 kg)	1998-03-21	Michigan State
G	21	Pat Connaughton	6 ft 5 in (1.96 m)	209 lb (95 kg)	1993-01-06	Notre Dame
F	14	Moussa Diabaté	6 ft 10 in (2.08 m)	210 lb (95 kg)	2002-01-21	Michigan
G	10	Josh Green	6 ft 6 in (1.98 m)	200 lb (91 kg)	2000-11-16	Arizona
G	4	Sion James	6 ft 5 in (1.96 m)	220 lb (100 kg)	2002-12-04	Duke
C	11	Ryan Kalkbrenner	7 ft 1 in (2.16 m)	256 lb (116 kg)	2002-01-17	Creighton
G/F	7	Kon Knueppel	6 ft 6 in (1.98 m)	215 lb (98 kg)	2005-08-03	Duke
G	23	Tre Mann	6 ft 4 in (1.93 m)	178 lb (81 kg)	2001-02-03	Florida
F	33	Liam McNeeley	6 ft 7 in (2.01 m)	210 lb (95 kg)	2005-10-10	Connecticut
F	24	Brandon Miller	6 ft 7 in (2.01 m)	200 lb (91 kg)	2002-11-22	Alabama
F	9	Drew Peterson (TW)	6 ft 8 in (2.03 m)	205 lb (93 kg)	1999-11-09	USC
F/C	22	Mason Plumlee	7 ft 0 in (2.13 m)	254 lb (115 kg)	1990-03-05	Duke
G	12	Antonio Reeves (TW)	6 ft 5 in (1.96 m)	205 lb (93 kg)	2000-11-20	Kentucky
F	31	Tidjane Salaün	6 ft 10 in (2.08 m)	207 lb (94 kg)	2005-08-10	France
G	8	Collin Sexton	6 ft 3 in (1.91 m)	190 lb (86 kg)	1999-01-04	Alabama
G	25	KJ Simpson (TW)	6 ft 2 in (1.88 m)	189 lb (86 kg)	2002-08-08	Colorado
F	2	Grant Williams (injured)	6 ft 7 in (2.01 m)	236 lb (107 kg)	1998-11-30	Tennessee

Coaches
Head coach
- Charles Lee
Assistant(s)
- Jermaine Bucknor
- Ryan Frazier
- Matt Hill
- Josh Longstaff
- Blaine Mueller
- Kyle Neptune
- Zach Peterson
- Lamar Skeeter

Legend
- (DP) Unsigned draft pick
- (FA) Free agent
- (S) Suspended
- (GL) On assignment to G League affiliate
- (TW) Two-way affiliate player
- Injured

Roster
Updated: October 16, 2025

=== Miami Heat ===
Miami Heat roster
Players

Pos.	No.	Player	Height	Weight	DOB	From
F/C	13	Bam Adebayo	6 ft 9 in (2.06 m)	260 lb (118 kg)	1997-07-18	Kentucky
F	0	Simone Fontecchio	6 ft 7 in (2.01 m)	220 lb (100 kg)	1995-12-09	Italy
F	15	Myron Gardner (TW)	6 ft 5 in (1.96 m)	225 lb (102 kg)	2001-05-21	Little Rock
C	50	Vladislav Goldin (TW)	7 ft 0 in (2.13 m)	255 lb (116 kg)	2001-05-12	Michigan
G	14	Tyler Herro (injured)	6 ft 5 in (1.96 m)	205 lb (93 kg)	2000-01-20	Kentucky
G	25	Kasparas Jakučionis (GL)	6 ft 5 in (1.96 m)	205 lb (93 kg)	2006-05-29	Illinois
F	11	Jaime Jaquez Jr.	6 ft 6 in (1.98 m)	230 lb (104 kg)	2001-02-18	UCLA
F	16	Keshad Johnson	6 ft 6 in (1.98 m)	230 lb (104 kg)	2001-06-23	Arizona
F	5	Nikola Jović	6 ft 10 in (2.08 m)	240 lb (109 kg)	2003-06-09	Serbia
G	9	Pelle Larsson	6 ft 5 in (1.96 m)	215 lb (98 kg)	2001-02-23	Arizona
G	45	Davion Mitchell	6 ft 0 in (1.83 m)	210 lb (95 kg)	1998-09-05	Baylor
G	24	Norman Powell	6 ft 4 in (1.93 m)	215 lb (98 kg)	1993-05-25	UCLA
G	2	Terry Rozier (S)	6 ft 1 in (1.85 m)	195 lb (88 kg)	1994-03-17	Louisville
G	12	Dru Smith (injured)	6 ft 2 in (1.88 m)	200 lb (91 kg)	1997-12-30	Missouri
C	7	Kel'el Ware	7 ft 0 in (2.13 m)	250 lb (113 kg)	2004-04-20	Indiana
F	22	Andrew Wiggins	6 ft 7 in (2.01 m)	210 lb (95 kg)	1995-02-23	Kansas
G	17	Jahmir Young (TW)	6 ft 0 in (1.83 m)	185 lb (84 kg)	2000-10-07	Maryland

Coaches
Head coach
- Erik Spoelstra
Assistant(s)
- Malik Allen
- Caron Butler
- Octavio De La Grana
- Wayne Ellington
- Eric Glass
- Chris Quinn

Legend
- (DP) Unsigned draft pick
- (FA) Free agent
- (S) Suspended
- (GL) On assignment to G League affiliate
- (TW) Two-way affiliate player
- Injured

Roster
Updated: October 18, 2025

=== Orlando Magic ===
Orlando Magic roster
Players

Pos.	No.	Player	Height	Weight	DOB	From
F	5	Paolo Banchero	6 ft 10 in (2.08 m)	250 lb (113 kg)	2002-11-12	Duke
G	3	Desmond Bane	6 ft 6 in (1.98 m)	215 lb (98 kg)	1998-06-25	TCU
F/C	35	Goga Bitadze	6 ft 11 in (2.11 m)	250 lb (113 kg)	1999-07-20	Georgia
G	0	Anthony Black	6 ft 7 in (2.01 m)	200 lb (91 kg)	2004-01-24	Arkansas
F	8	Jamal Cain (TW)	6 ft 7 in (2.01 m)	191 lb (87 kg)	1999-03-20	Oakland
C	34	Wendell Carter Jr.	6 ft 10 in (2.08 m)	270 lb (122 kg)	1999-04-16	Duke
C	14	Colin Castleton (TW)	6 ft 10 in (2.08 m)	250 lb (113 kg)	2000-05-25	Florida
F	23	Tristan da Silva	6 ft 8 in (2.03 m)	217 lb (98 kg)	2001-05-15	Colorado
F	13	Jett Howard	6 ft 8 in (2.03 m)	215 lb (98 kg)	2003-09-14	Michigan
F	1	Jonathan Isaac	6 ft 10 in (2.08 m)	230 lb (104 kg)	1997-10-03	Florida State
G	2	Tyus Jones	6 ft 0 in (1.83 m)	196 lb (89 kg)	1996-05-10	Duke
G/F	93	Noah Penda	6 ft 7 in (2.01 m)	215 lb (98 kg)	2005-01-07	France
G	11	Jase Richardson	6 ft 1 in (1.85 m)	180 lb (82 kg)	2005-10-16	Michigan State
C	7	Orlando Robinson (TW)	6 ft 10 in (2.08 m)	235 lb (107 kg)	2000-07-10	Fresno State
G	4	Jalen Suggs	6 ft 5 in (1.96 m)	205 lb (93 kg)	2001-06-03	Gonzaga
F	22	Franz Wagner	6 ft 10 in (2.08 m)	220 lb (100 kg)	2001-08-27	Michigan
F/C	21	Moritz Wagner (injured)	6 ft 11 in (2.11 m)	245 lb (111 kg)	1997-04-26	Michigan

Coaches
Head coach
- Jamahl Mosley
Assistant(s)
- Bret Brielmaier
- Lionel Chalmers
- Randy Gregory
- Dale Osbourne
- Joe Prunty
- God Shammgod

Legend
- (DP) Unsigned draft pick
- (FA) Free agent
- (S) Suspended
- (GL) On assignment to G League affiliate
- (TW) Two-way affiliate player
- Injured

Roster
Updated: November 15, 2025

=== Washington Wizards ===
Washington Wizards roster
Players

Pos.	No.	Player	Height	Weight	DOB	From
F	35	Marvin Bagley III	6 ft 10 in (2.08 m)	235 lb (107 kg)	1999-03-14	Duke
F	8	Malaki Branham	6 ft 4 in (1.93 m)	180 lb (82 kg)	2003-05-12	Ohio State
G	7	Bub Carrington	6 ft 4 in (1.93 m)	190 lb (86 kg)	2005-07-21	Pittsburgh
G/F	9	Justin Champagnie	6 ft 6 in (1.98 m)	206 lb (93 kg)	2001-06-29	Pittsburgh
G	13	Sharife Cooper (TW)	6 ft 0 in (1.83 m)	180 lb (82 kg)	2001-06-11	Auburn
G	0	Bilal Coulibaly	6 ft 7 in (2.01 m)	195 lb (88 kg)	2004-07-26	France
F	18	Kyshawn George	6 ft 8 in (2.03 m)	200 lb (91 kg)	2003-12-12	Miami (FL)
F	16	Anthony Gill	6 ft 7 in (2.01 m)	230 lb (104 kg)	1992-10-17	Virginia
G	4	AJ Johnson	6 ft 5 in (1.96 m)	160 lb (73 kg)	2004-12-01	SoCal Academy (CA)
G	12	Tre Johnson	6 ft 5 in (1.96 m)	190 lb (86 kg)	2006-03-07	Texas
F	24	Corey Kispert	6 ft 6 in (1.98 m)	224 lb (102 kg)	1999-03-03	Gonzaga
G	3	CJ McCollum	6 ft 3 in (1.91 m)	190 lb (86 kg)	1991-09-19	Lehigh
F	22	Khris Middleton	6 ft 7 in (2.01 m)	222 lb (101 kg)	1991-08-12	Texas A&M
F	27	Will Riley	6 ft 9 in (2.06 m)	180 lb (82 kg)	2006-02-10	Illinois
C	20	Alex Sarr	7 ft 0 in (2.13 m)	205 lb (93 kg)	2005-04-26	France
F	00	Tristan Vukčević (TW)	7 ft 0 in (2.13 m)	220 lb (100 kg)	2003-03-11	Serbia
F	5	Jamir Watkins (TW)	6 ft 6 in (1.98 m)	210 lb (95 kg)	2001-07-06	Florida State
F	1	Cam Whitmore	6 ft 6 in (1.98 m)	230 lb (104 kg)	2004-07-08	Villanova

Coaches
Head coach
- Brian Keefe
Assistant(s)
- Alexis Ajinça
- Adam Caporn
- JJ Outlaw
- T. J. Sorrentine
- David Vanterpool

Legend
- (DP) Unsigned draft pick
- (FA) Free agent
- (S) Suspended
- (GL) G League assignment
- (TW) Two-way affiliate player
- Injured

Roster
Updated: October 19, 2025

== See also ==
- List of current NBA Western Conference team rosters
- List of current NBA head coaches
- List of NBA general managers
- List of NBA team presidents
