= Lamar Skeeter =

American basketball coach

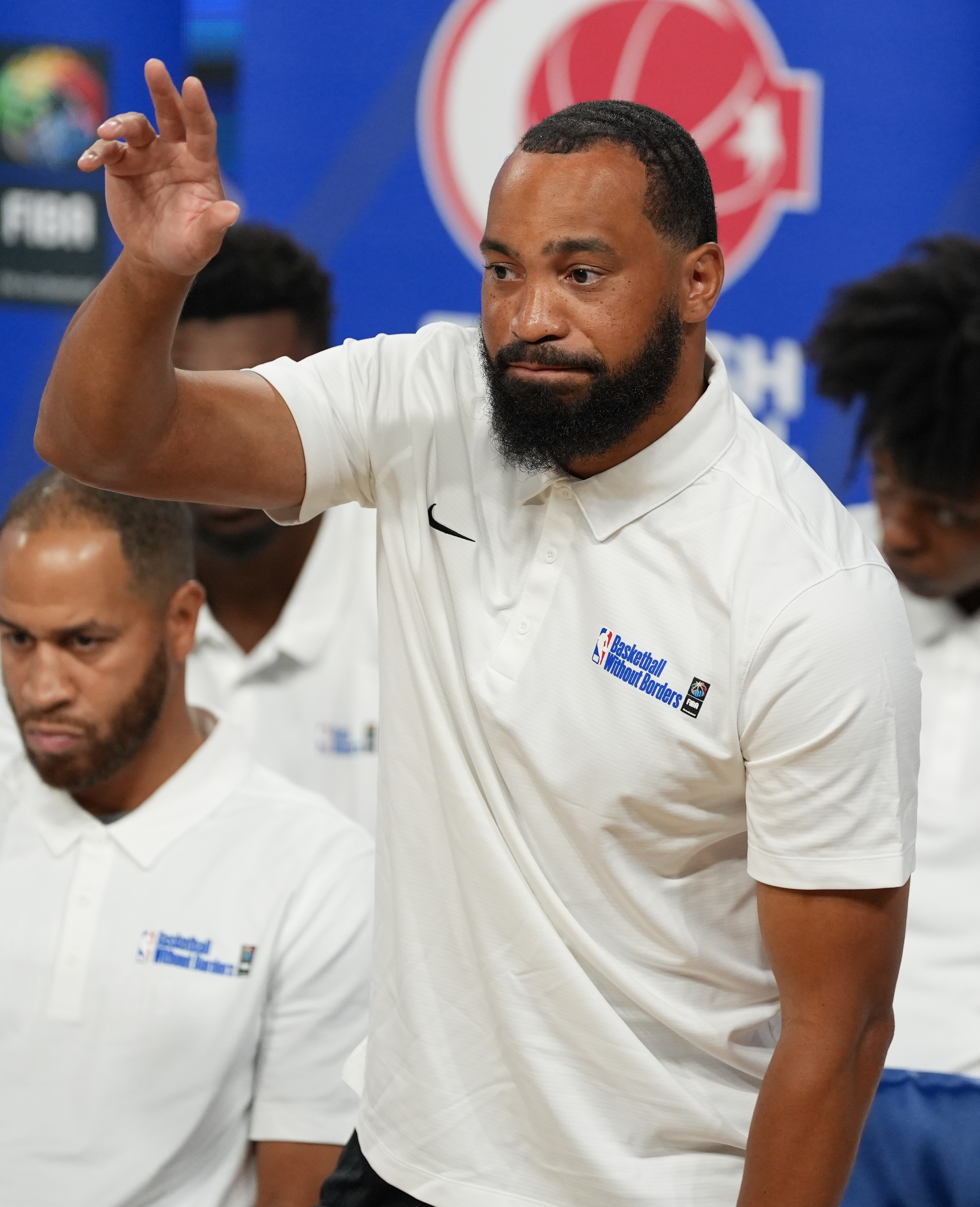
- Skeeter in 2026

Charlotte Hornets
- Position: Assistant coach
- League: NBA

Personal information
- Born: April 20, 1989 (age 37) San Bernardino, California, U.S.

Career information
- High school: Fairmont High School (Kettering, Ohio)
- College: Walsh
- Coaching career: 2012–present

Career history

Coaching
- 2012-2013: Canton Charge (assistant)
- 2013-2014: Atlanta Hawks (player development coach/video intern)
- 2014-2024: Utah Jazz (assistant/player development coach)
- 2024-present: Charlotte Hornets (assistant)

Lamar Nikko Skeeter (born April 20, 1989) is an American professional basketball coach who is an assistant coach for the Charlotte Hornets of the National Basketball Association (NBA).

== Coaching career ==
Skeeter began his coaching career as an assistant coach with the Canton Charge under head coach Alex Jensen.

In 2013, Skeeter was hired as a player development coach and video intern for the Atlanta Hawks under head coach Mike Budenholzer.

In 2014, Skeeter joined the Utah Jazz and worked as a player development coach and assistant coach under head coaches Quin Snyder and Will Hardy.

After 10 years with the Jazz, Skeeter left Utah in 2024 and was hired by the Charlotte Hornets as an assistant coach under head coach Charles Lee.
