= Will Hardy =

American basketball coach (born 1988)

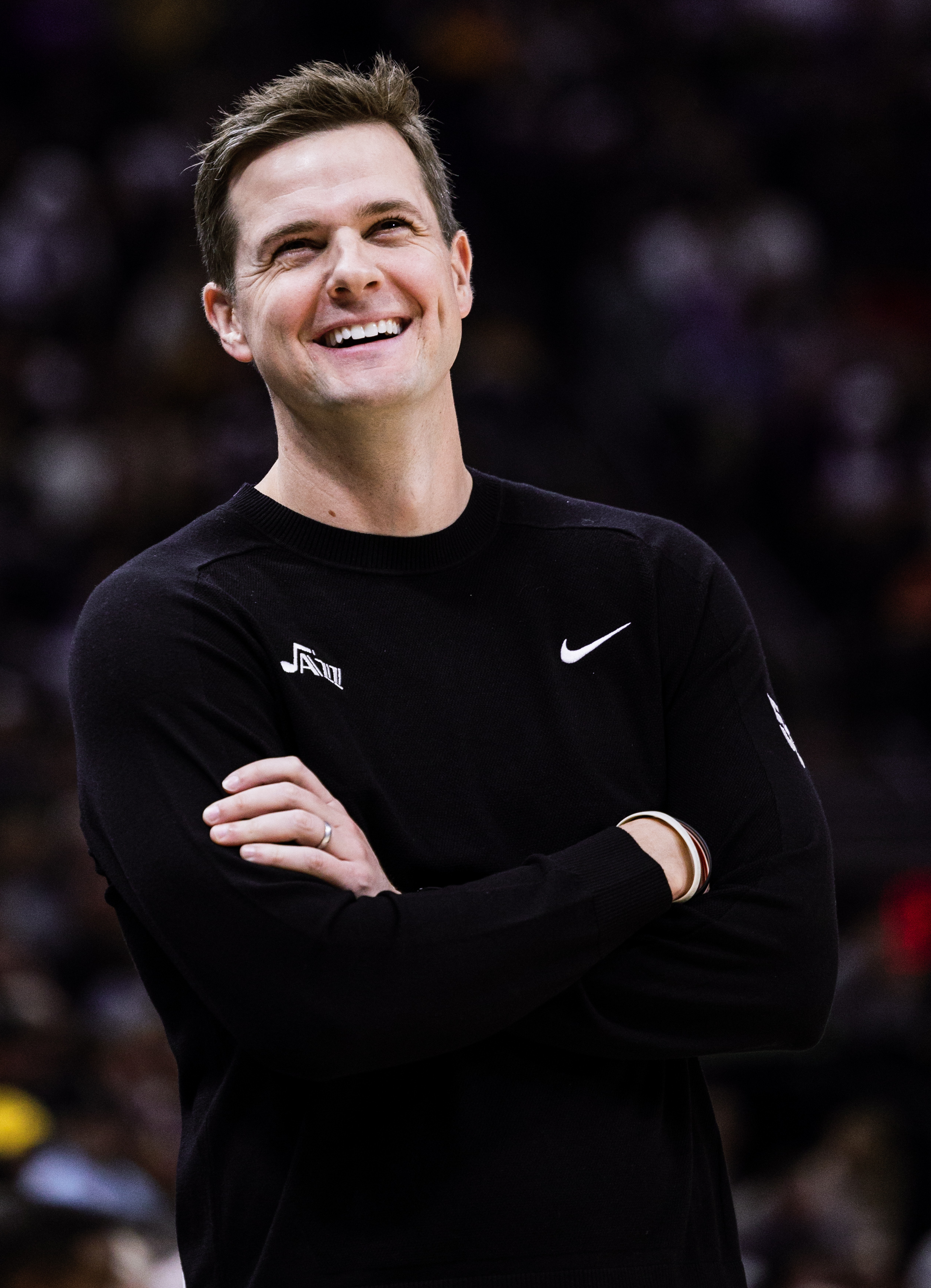
- Hardy in 2023

Utah Jazz
- Title: Head coach
- League: NBA

Personal information
- Born: January 21, 1988 (age 38) Richmond, Virginia, U.S.
- Listed height: 6 ft 6 in (1.98 m)
- Listed weight: 205 lb (93 kg)

Career information
- High school: St. Christopher's (Richmond, Virginia)
- College: Williams (2006–2010)
- Position: Small forward
- Coaching career: 2015–present

Career history

Coaching
- 2015–2021: San Antonio Spurs (assistant)
- 2021–2022: Boston Celtics (assistant)
- 2022–present: Utah Jazz

William Culvahouse Hardy (born January 21, 1988) is an American professional basketball coach and former collegiate player who is the head coach for the Utah Jazz of the National Basketball Association (NBA).

== Professional career ==
=== San Antonio Spurs and Boston Celtics ===
After graduating from Williams College, Hardy was connected with San Antonio Spurs head coach Gregg Popovich through a member of the basketball staff at Williams College who was an associate of Popovich and recommended him for an internship thanks to his high basketball IQ. Hardy coached the Spurs Summer League team for several years while working in other roles for the main team. Before the 2021–22 NBA season, Hardy joined the Boston Celtics as assistant for head coach Ime Udoka.

=== Utah Jazz ===
On June 29, 2022, the Utah Jazz hired Hardy as their head coach, making him the first head coach hired under the new ownership of Ryan Smith.

On May 5, 2025, Hardy and the Jazz agreed to a multiyear contract extension that runs through the 2031 season.

== Head coaching record ==
Legend
Regular season	G	Games coached	W	Games won	L	Games lost	W–L %	Win–loss %
Playoffs	PG	Playoff games	PW	Playoff wins	PL	Playoff losses	PW–L %	Playoff win–loss %

Team	Year	G	W	L	W–L%	Finish	PG	PW	PL	PW–L%	Result
Utah	2022–23	82	37	45	.451	4th in Northwest	—	—	—	—	Missed playoffs
Utah	2023–24	82	31	51	.378	4th in Northwest	—	—	—	—	Missed playoffs
Utah	2024–25	82	17	65	.207	5th in Northwest	—	—	—	—	Missed playoffs
Utah	2025–26	82	22	60	.268	5th in Northwest	—	—	—	—	Missed playoffs
Career		328	107	221	.326		—	—	—	—	

== Personal life ==
Hardy is from Richmond, Virginia. He has two daughters. He runs the Will Hardy Foundation, a nonprofit organization dedicated to raising funds and awareness for amyotrophic lateral sclerosis (ALS) while providing aid to families affected by the disease. The foundation was established in honor of his father, Bill Hardy, who died from ALS in 2015.
