= 2026–27 Detroit Pistons season =

2026–27 NBA season by team

- Head coach: J. B. Bickerstaff
- President: Trajan Langdon
- Owner: Tom Gores
- Arena: Little Caesars Arena

Results
- Record: 10–5 (.667)
- Place: Division: 1st (Central); Conference: 3rd (Eastern)
- Stats at Basketball Reference

Local media
- Television: WMYD (Scripps Sports)
- Radio: WXYT

The 2026–27 Detroit Pistons season is the 86th season of the franchise, the 79th in the National Basketball Association (NBA), and the tenth in Midtown Detroit. This is the Pistons' third season under head coach J. B. Bickerstaff. The Pistons will attempt to defend their division championship from the previous season.

== Draft ==
Round	Pick	Player	Position	Nationality	College / Team
1	21	Karim López	SF	Mexico	New Zealand Breakers

The Pistons entered the draft holding one first-round pick from a swap with the Minnesota Timberwolves as part of a three-team trade in February 2026, as both teams' picks fell outside the top-19 protection. They had traded their original second-round pick to the Los Angeles Clippers in 2020, which ultimately conveyed to the New Orleans Pelicans following five subsequent trades.

On the first night of the draft, the Pistons used their only selection to draft Karim López, but later traded his draft rights to the Memphis Grizzlies for Ebuka Okorie, who was selected by the Oklahoma City Thunder with the 17th overall pick. On the second night of the draft, the Pistons traded for Ugonna Onyenso, who was drafted by the Houston Rockets with the 53rd overall pick, as part of a trade with the New York Knicks.

== Roster ==
Detroit Pistons roster
Players

Pos.	No.	Player	Height	Weight	DOB	From
F/C	20	John Collins	6 ft 9 in (2.06 m)	226 lb (103 kg)	1997-09-23	Wake Forest
G	2	Cade Cunningham	6 ft 6 in (1.98 m)	220 lb (100 kg)	2001-09-25	Oklahoma State
C	0	Jalen Duren (injured)	6 ft 10 in (2.08 m)	250 lb (113 kg)	2003-11-18	Memphis
G	31	Javonte Green	6 ft 5 in (1.96 m)	205 lb (93 kg)	1993-07-23	Radford
G	94	Elijah Harkless (TW)	6 ft 3 in (1.91 m)	195 lb (88 kg)	2000-02-03	UNLV
F	5	Ron Holland II	6 ft 8 in (2.03 m)	206 lb (93 kg)	2005-07-07	Duncanville HS (TX)
G/F	27	Kevin Huerter	6 ft 6 in (1.98 m)	190 lb (86 kg)	1998-08-27	Maryland
G	24	Daniss Jenkins	6 ft 4 in (1.93 m)	165 lb (75 kg)	2001-08-17	St. John's
G	17	Isaiah Joe	6 ft 4 in (1.93 m)	165 lb (75 kg)	1999-07-02	Arkansas
F	13	Isaac Jones (TW)	6 ft 8 in (2.03 m)	245 lb (111 kg)	2000-07-11	Washington State
G	8	Chaz Lanier	6 ft 4 in (1.93 m)	206 lb (93 kg)	2001-12-19	Tennessee
G	23	Ebuka Okorie	6 ft 2 in (1.88 m)	185 lb (84 kg)	2007-04-10	Stanford
C	34	Ugonna Onyenso (TW)	6 ft 11 in (2.11 m)	225 lb (102 kg)	2004-09-25	Virginia
F	12	Taurean Prince	6 ft 6 in (1.98 m)	218 lb (99 kg)	1994-03-22	Baylor
F	7	Paul Reed	6 ft 9 in (2.06 m)	210 lb (95 kg)	1999-06-26	DePaul
F	55	Duncan Robinson	6 ft 7 in (2.01 m)	215 lb (98 kg)	1994-04-22	Michigan
F	35	Tolu Smith	6 ft 11 in (2.11 m)	245 lb (111 kg)	2001-07-26	Mississippi State
G/F	9	Ausar Thompson	6 ft 7 in (2.01 m)	205 lb (93 kg)	2003-01-30	Pine Crest HS (FL)

Coaches
Head coach
- J. B. Bickerstaff
Assistant(s)
- Jerome Allen
- Kevin Burleson
- Josh Estes
- Jarrett Jack
- Sidney Lowe
- Vitaly Potapenko
- Steve Scalzi
- Fred Vinson
- Luke Walton

Legend
- (DP) Unsigned draft pick
- (FA) Free agent
- (S) Suspended
- (GL) On assignment to G League affiliate
- (TW) Two-way affiliate player
- Injured

Roster
Updated: October 17, 2026

== Standings ==
=== Division ===
Central Division	W	L	PCT	GB	Home	Road	Div	GP
Detroit Pistons	10	5	.667	–	3‍–‍3	7‍–‍2	0–0	15
Cleveland Cavaliers	9	8	.529	2.0	7‍–‍3	2‍–‍5	3–0	17
Indiana Pacers	5	11	.313	5.5	2‍–‍6	3‍–‍5	0–2	16
Chicago Bulls	4	11	.267	6.0	1‍–‍5	3‍–‍6	1–1	15
Milwaukee Bucks	1	16	.059	10.0	1‍–‍8	0‍–‍8	1–2	17

=== Conference ===
Eastern Conference
#	Team	W	L	PCT	GB	GP
1	Philadelphia 76ers *	14	3	.824	–	17
2	Boston Celtics	11	5	.688	2.5	16
3	Detroit Pistons *	10	5	.667	3.0	15
4	Atlanta Hawks *	10	6	.625	3.5	16
5	New York Knicks	10	6	.625	3.5	16
6	Miami Heat	9	6	.600	4.0	15
7	Cleveland Cavaliers	9	8	.529	5.0	17
8	Orlando Magic	7	8	.467	6.0	15
9	Toronto Raptors	6	10	.375	7.5	16
10	Washington Wizards	6	11	.353	8.0	17
11	Indiana Pacers	5	11	.313	8.5	16
12	Charlotte Hornets	4	11	.267	9.0	15
13	Chicago Bulls	4	11	.267	9.0	15
14	Brooklyn Nets	3	12	.200	10.0	15
15	Milwaukee Bucks	1	16	.059	13.0	17

== Game log ==
=== Preseason ===
2026 preseason game log
Total: 3–1 (Home: 2–0; Road: 1–1)
Preseason: 3–1 (home: 2–0; road: 1–1)

Game	Date	Team	Score	High points	High rebounds	High assists	Location Attendance	Record
1	October 5	Phoenix	W 109–107	Ron Holland II (14)	Paul Reed (7)	Daniss Jenkins (4)	Little Caesars Arena; 12,007	1–0
2	October 10	@ Washington	L 108–114 (OT)	Ebuka Okorie (14)	Tolu Smith (13)	Ebuka Okorie (6)	Capital One Arena; 10,791	1–1
3	October 14	@ Minnesota	W 128–106	Jalen Duren (24)	Robinson, Smith (6)	Cade Cunningham (9)	Target Center; 10,262	2–1
4	October 16	Toronto	W 129–125	Cade Cunningham (18)	Collins, Holland II (8)	Cade Cunningham (7)	Little Caesars Arena; 12,639	3–1

2026–27 preseason schedule

=== Regular season ===
2026–27 game log
Total: 10–5 (Home: 3–3; Road: 7–2)
October: 5–1 (home: 2–0; road: 3–1)

Game	Date	Team	Score	High points	High rebounds	High assists	Location Attendance	Record
1	October 20	Boston	W 121–113	Cunningham, Duren (22)	Ausar Thompson (11)	Cade Cunningham (8)	Little Caesars Arena; 20,178	1–0
2	October 23	@ Miami	W 128–111	John Collins (23)	Paul Reed (11)	Cade Cunningham (8)	Kaseya Center; 19,616	2–0
3	October 25	@ Philadelphia	W 106–93	Cade Cunningham (26)	John Collins (11)	Cade Cunningham (8)	Xfinity Mobile Arena; 21,117	3–0
4	October 27	@ New York	L 97–111	Paul Reed (22)	Tied (9)	Cade Cunningham (8)	Madison Square Garden; 19,812	3–1
5	October 28	Charlotte	W 97–89	Cade Cunningham (30)	Ausar Thompson (9)	Ausar Thompson (8)	Little Caesars Arena; 19,023	4–1
6	October 30	@ Brooklyn	W 110–94	Cade Cunningham (20)	John Collins (9)	Ausar Thompson (6)	Barclays Center; 17,548	5–1

November: 5–5 (home: 1–3; road: 4–2)

Game	Date	Team	Score	High points	High rebounds	High assists	Location Attendance	Record
7	November 2	@ Charlotte	W 124–91	Cade Cunningham (33)	Ausar Thompson (6)	Cunningham, Jenkins (7)	Spectrum Center; 18,760	6–1
8	November 4	Philadelphia	L 106–112	Duncan Robinson (27)	Ausar Thompson (17)	Cade Cunningham (11)	Little Caesars Arena; 20,198	6–2
9	November 8	L.A. Lakers	L 116–121	Daniss Jenkins (31)	Ausar Thompson (11)	Cade Cunningham (8)	Little Caesars Arena; 20,178	6–3
10	November 9	Washington	W 122–111	John Collins (24)	Collins, Reed (10)	Daniss Jenkins (8)	Little Caesars Arena; 18,982	7–3
11	November 12	@ Washington	W 144–140 (2OT)	Cade Cunningham (52)	Thompson, Reed (11)	Thompson, Cunningham (11)	Capital One Arena; 17,443	8–3
12	November 14	@ Miami	L 117–137	Cade Cunningham (33)	Paul Reed (9)	Cade Cunningham (8)	Kaseya Center; 19,658	8–4
13	November 17	@ San Antonio	W 105–93	Cade Cunningham (27)	Ausar Thompson (9)	Ausar Thompson (12)	Frost Bank Center; 18,412	9–4
14	November 18	@ New Orleans	W 122–109	John Collins (20)	Tied (7)	Daniss Jenkins (9)	Smoothie King Center; 16,779	10–4
15	November 20	Toronto	L 102–105	Cade Cunningham (23)	Thompson, Collins (6)	Cade Cunningham (9)	Little Caesars Arena; 20,178	10–5
16	November 22	@ Atlanta	L 97–107	Isaiah Joe (19)	Ausar Thompson (11)	Cade Cunningham (15)	State Farm Arena; 16,631	10–6
17	November 24	@ Orlando					Kia Center	–
18	November 27	Milwaukee					Little Caesars Arena	–
19	November 29	Orlando					Little Caesars Arena	–
20	November 30	Denver					Little Caesars Arena	–

December: 0–0 (home: 0–0; road: 0–0)

Game	Date	Team	Score	High points	High rebounds	High assists	Location Attendance	Record
21	December 2	Memphis					Little Caesars Arena	–
22	December	TBD					TBD	–
23	December	TBD					TBD	–
24	December 13	@ Indiana					Gainbridge Fieldhouse	–
25	December 14	Brooklyn					Little Caesars Arena	–
26	December 16	Phoenix					Little Caesars Arena	–
27	December 18	Cleveland					Little Caesars Arena	–
28	December 20	@ Boston					TD Garden	–
29	December 22	@ Oklahoma City					Paycom Center	–
30	December 23	@ Atlanta					State Farm Arena	–
31	December 26	@ Chicago					United Center	–
32	December 27	Portland					Little Caesars Arena	–
33	December 30	New Orleans					Little Caesars Arena	–

January: 0–0 (home: 0–0; road: 0–0)

Game	Date	Team	Score	High points	High rebounds	High assists	Location Attendance	Record
34	January 1	Orlando					Little Caesars Arena	–
35	January 3	@ Denver					Ball Arena	–
36	January 5	@ Sacramento					Golden 1 Center	–
37	January 7	@ Golden State					Chase Center	–
38	January 8	@ L.A. Lakers					Crypto.com Arena	–
39	January 10	Utah					Little Caesars Arena	–
40	January 12	@ Toronto					Scotiabank Arena	–
41	January 14	Dallas					Little Caesars Arena	–
42	January 16	@ Houston					Toyota Center	–
43	January 18	@ Cleveland					Rocket Arena	–
44	January 22	Indiana					Little Caesars Arena	–
45	January 24	Minnesota					Little Caesars Arena	–
46	January 26	Atlanta					Little Caesars Arena	–
47	January 27	@ Cleveland					Rocket Arena	–
48	January 29	@ Dallas					American Airlines Center	–
49	January 31	Sacramento					Little Caesars Arena	–

February: 0–0 (home: 0–0; road: 0–0)

Game	Date	Team	Score	High points	High rebounds	High assists	Location Attendance	Record
50	February 2	Chicago					Little Caesars Arena	–
51	February 3	New York					Little Caesars Arena	–
52	February 5	@ Philadelphia					Xfinity Mobile Arena	–
53	February 7	Golden State					Little Caesars Arena	–
54	February 9	@ L.A. Clippers					Intuit Dome	–
55	February 10	@ Phoenix					Mortgage Matchup Center	–
56	February 13	@ Portland					Moda Center	–
57	February 15	@ Utah					Delta Center	–
58	February 17	New York					Little Caesars Arena	–
All-Star Game
59	February 25	Miami					Little Caesars Arena	–
60	February 27	Oklahoma City					Little Caesars Arena	–

March: 0–0 (home: 0–0; road: 0–0)

Game	Date	Team	Score	High points	High rebounds	High assists	Location Attendance	Record
61	March 1	Chicago					Little Caesars Arena	–
62	March 2	@ Milwaukee					Fiserv Forum	–
63	March 5	Boston					Little Caesars Arena	–
64	March 9	Cleveland					Little Caesars Arena	–
65	March 11	Milwaukee					Little Caesars Arena	–
66	March 13	Brooklyn					Little Caesars Arena	–
67	March 14	@ Toronto					Scotiabank Arena	–
68	March 16	@ Indiana					Gainbridge Fieldhouse	–
69	March 18	@ Milwaukee					Fiserv Forum	–
70	March 20	Charlotte					Little Caesars Arena	–
71	March 22	@ Minnesota					Target Center	–
72	March 24	@ Charlotte					Spectrum Center	–
73	March 25	Houston					Little Caesars Arena	–
74	March 27	San Antonio					Little Caesars Arena	–
75	March 29	L.A. Clippers					Little Caesars Arena	–
76	March 31	Toronto					Little Caesars Arena	–

April: 0–0 (home: 0–0; road: 0–0)

Game	Date	Team	Score	High points	High rebounds	High assists	Location Attendance	Record
77	April 2	@ Chicago					United Center	–
78	April 4	Miami					Little Caesars Arena	–
79	April 6	@ Memphis					FedEx Forum	–
80	April 7	Indiana					Little Caesars Arena	–
81	April 9	@ New York					Madison Square Garden	–
82	April 11	@ Washington					Capital One Arena	–

2026–27 season schedule

== NBA Cup ==
=== East Group A ===
Pos	Team	Pld	W	L	PF	PA	PD	Qualification
1	Orlando Magic	3	3	0	341	324	+17	Advance to knockout stage
2	Toronto Raptors	3	2	1	340	330	+10	Possible knockout stage based on ranking
3	Detroit Pistons	2	1	1	212	199	+13	
4	Brooklyn Nets	2	0	2	205	223	−18	
5	Milwaukee Bucks	2	0	2	206	228	−22	

Updated to game(s) played on November 20, 2026. Source:

== Transactions ==
=== Overview ===
Players Added

Via draft

- Karim López

Via trade

- John Collins
- Gary Harris
- Isaiah Joe
- Ebuka Okorie
- Ugonna Onyenso
- Taurean Prince

Via free agency

- Elijah Harkless
Players Lost

Via trade

- Caris LeVert
- Karim López
- Marcus Sasser
- Isaiah Stewart

Via free agency

- Tobias Harris
- Wendell Moore Jr.

Waived

- Gary Harris

=== Trades ===
Date	Trade		Ref.
June 24, 2026	To Detroit Pistons: Draft rights to Ebuka Okorie (No. 17)	To Memphis Grizzlies: Draft rights to Karim López (No. 21); 2029 second-round pick (Note: The most favorable of the picks originally belonging to Detroit, Milwaukee, and New York.) (Note: Detroit agreed to trade this pick to Memphis during the first round of the 2026 NBA draft for the draft rights to Ebuka Okorie. During the second round, Memphis agreed to send the pick back to Detroit for Isaiah Stewart.); 2031 DAL second-round pick; 2032 DET second-round pick	
June 24, 2026	To Detroit Pistons: Draft rights to Ugonna Onyenso (No. 53)	To New York Knicks: Cash considerations	
July 6, 2026	To Detroit Pistons: Isaiah Joe	To Oklahoma City Thunder: 2030 MIN second-round pick; 2031 DET second-round pick	
July 8, 2026	Six-team trade		
July 8, 2026	To Dallas Mavericks: Santi Aldama (from Memphis); Marcus Sasser (from Detroit); Draft rights to Tarik Biberović (2023 No. 56) (from Memphis)	To Detroit Pistons: John Collins (sign-and-trade) (from Los Angeles); Gary Harris (from Milwaukee); Taurean Prince (from Milwaukee); 2029 second-round pick (from Memphis); 2031 DAL second-round pick (from Memphis); 2032 DET second-round pick (from Memphis)	
July 8, 2026	To Los Angeles Clippers: 2028 protected second-round pick (Note: Los Angeles will receive the pick if falls to No. 56–60.) (from Detroit)	To Memphis Grizzlies: AJ Johnson (from Dallas); D'Angelo Russell (from Washington); Isaiah Stewart (from Detroit); 2029 HOU second-round pick (from Dallas); 2029 LAL second-round pick (from Washington); 2030 GSW protected first-round pick (Note: Memphis will receive the pick if falls to No. 21–30; if it falls to No. 1–20, Memphis will receive Golden State's own 2030 second-round pick.) (from Dallas); 2032 second-round pick swap right (Note: Memphis may swap the more favorable of their own pick and the pick originally belonging to Philadelphia for the pick originally belonging to Utah.) (from Washington); 2033 WAS second-round pick (from Washington)	
July 8, 2026	To Milwaukee Bucks: Caris LeVert (from Detroit); 2027 MIL second-round pick (Note: Milwaukee traded this pick away in a previous transaction.) (from Detroit); 2027 second-round pick (Note: The less favorable of the picks originally belonging to Brooklyn and Dallas.) (from Detroit); Cash considerations (from Los Angeles)	To Washington Wizards: Khris Middleton (sign-and-trade) (from Dallas); 2033 DAL second-round pick (from Dallas)	

=== Free agency ===
==== Re-signed ====
Date	Player	Ref.
July 8	Javonte Green	
July 9	Kevin Huerter	
October 2	Jalen Duren	

==== Additions ====
Date	Player	Former Team	Ref.
July 8	Elijah Harkless	Utah Jazz	

==== Subtractions ====
Date	Player	Reason	New Team	Ref.
July 6	Tobias Harris	Unrestricted free agent	San Antonio Spurs	
July 28	Wendell Moore Jr.	Unrestricted free agent	(Italy) Virtus Bologna	
September 28	Gary Harris	Waived		
