= 2026–27 Los Angeles Lakers season =

- Head coach: JJ Redick
- President: Jeanie Buss; Rob Pelinka (vice)
- General manager: Rob Pelinka
- Owner(s): Josh Kushner and Bob Iger (majority); Jeanie Buss, Todd Boehly, Edward P. Roski, and Patrick Soon-Shiong (minority)
- Arena: Crypto.com Arena

Results
- Record: 14–3 (.824)
- Place: Division: 1st (Pacific); Conference: 2nd (Western)
- Stats at Basketball Reference

Local media
- Television: Spectrum SportsNet
- Radio: ESPN LA 710 (English); 1020 Radio AM (Spanish)

The 2026–27 Los Angeles Lakers season is the ongoing 80th season of the franchise, its 79th season in the National Basketball Association (NBA), its ongoing 67th season in Los Angeles, and its ongoing 28th season playing home games at Crypto.com Arena. This is the first season since 2017–18 to not feature LeBron James, who announced that he would no longer be playing for the Lakers for his 24th season; he would later sign with the Philadelphia 76ers. This season would also see the surprise sale of the Lakers to Bob Iger and Joshua Kushner, as Mark Walter and TWG Global would end up selling Walter's majority ownership after one season as the team's owner.

== Draft picks ==
Round	Pick	Player	Position(s)	Nationality	College / Club
1	25	Sergio de Larrea	PG/SG	Spain	Valencia Basket (Spain)

The Lakers entered the draft holding one first-round selection. They have previously traded their second-round selection to the Cleveland Cavaliers in 2020 and the pick was eventually used by the Golden State Warriors in the draft.

== Roster ==
Los Angeles Lakers roster
Players

Pos.	No.	Player	Height	Weight	DOB	From
G	43	Cameron Carr (GL)	6 ft 5 in (1.96 m)	184 lb (83 kg)	2004-11-21	Baylor
C	20	Carson Cooper (TW)	6 ft 10 in (2.08 m)	245 lb (111 kg)	2004-04-09	Michigan State
G/F	77	Luka Dončić	6 ft 8 in (2.03 m)	230 lb (104 kg)	1999-02-28	Slovenia
G	5	Quentin Grimes	6 ft 4 in (1.93 m)	210 lb (95 kg)	2000-05-08	Houston
G	7	Jaden Hardy	6 ft 4 in (1.93 m)	198 lb (90 kg)	2002-07-05	Coronado HS (NV)
G	9	Bronny James	6 ft 2 in (1.88 m)	210 lb (95 kg)	2004-10-06	USC
F	47	Arthur Kaluma (TW)	6 ft 7 in (2.01 m)	225 lb (102 kg)	2002-03-01	Texas
C	14	Walker Kessler	7 ft 1 in (2.16 m)	245 lb (111 kg)	2001-07-26	Auburn
F	12	Jake LaRavia	6 ft 8 in (2.03 m)	235 lb (107 kg)	2001-11-03	Wake Forest
F	55	Kevon Looney	6 ft 9 in (2.06 m)	222 lb (101 kg)	1996-02-06	UCLA
F/C	54	Sandro Mamukelashvili	6 ft 10 in (2.08 m)	240 lb (109 kg)	1999-05-23	Seton Hall
G	30	Chris Mañon (TW)	6 ft 4 in (1.93 m)	209 lb (95 kg)	2001-12-09	Vanderbilt
G	15	Austin Reaves	6 ft 5 in (1.96 m)	197 lb (89 kg)	1998-05-29	Oklahoma
G	10	Collin Sexton	6 ft 1 in (1.85 m)	190 lb (86 kg)	1999-01-04	Alabama
F	1	Adou Thiero	6 ft 7 in (2.01 m)	220 lb (100 kg)	2004-05-08	Arkansas
G/F	4	Matisse Thybulle	6 ft 5 in (1.96 m)	202 lb (92 kg)	1997-03-04	Washington
F	2	Jarred Vanderbilt	6 ft 8 in (2.03 m)	214 lb (97 kg)	1999-04-03	Kentucky
F	11	Ziaire Williams	6 ft 9 in (2.06 m)	185 lb (84 kg)	2001-09-12	Stanford

Coaches
Head coach
- JJ Redick
Assistant(s)
- Bob Beyer
- Scott Brooks
- Lindsey Harding
- Beau Levesque
- Nate McMillan
- Greg St. Jean

Legend
- (DP) Unsigned draft pick
- (FA) Free agent
- (S) Suspended
- (GL) On assignment to G League affiliate
- (TW) Two-way affiliate player
- (L) On leave from the team
- Injured

Roster
Updated: November 10, 2026

== Standings ==
=== Division ===
Pacific Division	W	L	PCT	GB	Home	Road	Div	GP
Los Angeles Lakers	14	3	.824	–	7‍–‍2	7‍–‍1	6–1	17
Phoenix Suns	8	7	.533	5.0	5‍–‍4	3‍–‍3	3–2	15
Golden State Warriors	8	8	.500	5.5	6‍–‍1	2‍–‍7	3–2	16
Los Angeles Clippers	4	10	.286	8.5	4‍–‍4	0‍–‍6	1–4	14
Sacramento Kings	1	14	.067	12.0	0‍–‍9	1‍–‍5	0–4	15

=== Conference ===
Western Conference
#	Team	W	L	PCT	GB	GP
1	Los Angeles Lakers *	14	3	.824	–	17
2	San Antonio Spurs *	13	3	.813	0.5	16
3	Memphis Grizzlies	12	4	.750	1.5	16
4	Houston Rockets	12	5	.706	2.0	17
5	Minnesota Timberwolves *	11	5	.688	2.5	16
6	Portland Trail Blazers	10	5	.667	3.0	15
7	Denver Nuggets	9	5	.643	3.5	14
8	Oklahoma City Thunder	10	6	.625	3.5	16
9	Phoenix Suns	8	7	.533	5.0	15
10	Dallas Mavericks	8	7	.533	5.0	15
11	Golden State Warriors	8	8	.500	5.5	16
12	New Orleans Pelicans	5	12	.294	9.0	17
13	Los Angeles Clippers	4	10	.286	8.5	14
14	Utah Jazz	3	14	.176	11.0	17
15	Sacramento Kings	1	14	.067	12.0	15

== Game log ==
=== Preseason ===
2026 preseason game log
Total: 2–3 (Home: 1–2; Road: 1–1)
Preseason: 2–3 (home: 1–2; road: 1–1)

Game	Date	Team	Score	High points	High rebounds	High assists	Location Attendance	Record
1	October 5	@ Sacramento	W 127–103	Luka Dončić (21)	Kevon Looney (9)	Sandro Mamukelashvili (5)	Golden 1 Center; 15,130	1–0
2	October 6	@ Golden State	L 98–124	Sandro Mamukelashvili (15)	Jarred Vanderbilt (5)	Bronny James Jr. (5)	Chase Center	1–1
3	October 8	Sacramento	W 114–110	Luka Dončić (23)	Jarred Vanderbilt (6)	Austin Reaves (8)	Crypto.com Arena; 18,350	2–1
4	October 13	Golden State	L 89–101	Austin Reaves (28)	Walker Kessler (9)	Austin Reaves (7)	T-Mobile Arena; 7,471	2–2
5	October 16	Denver	L 106–121	Austin Reaves (19)	Sandro Mamukelashvili (8)	Kessler, Mamukelashvili (4)	Crypto.com Arena; 19,057	2–3

2026–27 preseason schedule

=== Regular season ===
2026–27 game log
Total: 14–3 (Home: 7–2; Road: 7–1)
October: 4–2 (home: 2–1; road: 2–1)

Game	Date	Team	Score	High points	High rebounds	High assists	Location Attendance	Record
1	October 21	Golden State	W 127–105	Luka Dončić (28)	Walker Kessler (9)	Luka Dončić (7)	Crypto.com Arena; 19,057	1–0
2	October 23	L.A. Clippers	W 125–117	Austin Reaves (28)	Grimes, Kessler (8)	Austin Reaves (9)	Crypto.com Arena; 19,057	2–0
3	October 25	@ Utah	W 132–123	Luka Dončić (52)	Luka Dončić (8)	Luka Dončić (10)	Delta Center; 17,867	3–0
4	October 27	Portland	L 129–136	Luka Dončić (41)	Walker Kessler (8)	Luka Dončić (9)	Crypto.com Arena; 19,067	3–1
5	October 28	@ L.A. Clippers	W 103–87	Quentin Grimes (23)	Jake LaRavia (10)	Quentin Grimes (5)	Intuit Dome; 17,927	4–1
6	October 30	@ Golden State	L 95–112	Luka Dončić (37)	Walker Kessler (13)	Dončić, Reaves (5)	Chase Center; 18,064	4–2

November: 10–1 (home: 5–1; road: 5–0)

Game	Date	Team	Score	High points	High rebounds	High assists	Location Attendance	Record
7	November 1	Toronto	W 131–125	Luka Dončić (45)	Dončić, Kessler (15)	Luka Dončić (6)	Crypto.com Arena; 19,057	5–2
8	November 2	Miami	W 138–117	Luka Dončić (42)	Walker Kessler (15)	Luka Dončić (13)	Crypto.com Arena; 18,752	6–2
9	November 4	@ Sacramento	W 116–103	Luka Dončić (40)	Luka Dončić (9)	Luka Dončić (7)	Golden 1 Center; 14,484	7–2
10	November 6	Portland	W 124–118	Luka Dončić (53)	Walker Kessler (12)	Luka Dončić (5)	Crypto.com Arena; 19,057	8–2
11	November 8	@ Detroit	W 121–116	Austin Reaves (43)	Walker Kessler (16)	Tied (4)	Little Caesars Arena; 20,178	9–2
12	November 9	@ Atlanta	W 124–114	Luka Dončić (32)	Walker Kessler (10)	Luka Dončić (10)	State Farm Arena; 15,561	10–2
13	November 11	@ Milwaukee	W 123–112	Luka Dončić (32)	Walker Kessler (11)	Jake LaRavia (6)	Fiserv Forum; 15,356	11–2
14	November 15	@ Phoenix	W 131–123	Luka Dončić (43)	Walker Kessler (12)	Luka Dončić (9)	Mortgage Matchup Center; 17,071	12–2
15	November 17	Charlotte	W 118–114 (OT)	Quentin Grimes (47)	Kevon Looney (8)	Luka Dončić (7)	Crypto.com Arena; 19,057	13–2
16	November 18	Utah	L 97–109	Luka Dončić (29)	Walker Kessler (11)	Luka Dončić (7)	Crypto.com Arena; 19,057	13–3
17	November 20	Sacramento	W 106–104	Luka Dončić (25)	Sandro Mamukelashvili (9)	Luka Dončić (8)	Crypto.com Arena; 19,057	14–3
18	November 23	Utah					Crypto.com Arena	–
19	November 27	@ San Antonio					Frost Bank Center	–
20	November 29	@ Memphis					FedExForum	–
21	November 30	@ Houston					Toyota Center	–

December: 0–0 (home: 0–0; road: 0–0)

Game	Date	Team	Score	High points	High rebounds	High assists	Location Attendance	Record
22	December 2	@ New Orleans					Smoothie King Center	–
23	TBD	TBD					TBD	–
24	TBD	TBD					TBD	–
25	December 14	New Orleans					Crypto.com Arena	–
26	December 16	@ Minnesota					Target Center	–
27	December 18	@ Minnesota					Target Center	–
28	December 19	@ Denver					Ball Arena	–
29	December 21	Indiana					Crypto.com Arena	–
30	December 23	Denver					Crypto.com Arena	–
31	December 25	Philadelphia					Crypto.com Arena	–
32	December 27	Memphis					Crypto.com Arena	–
33	December 29	Houston					Crypto.com Arena	–
34	December 31	@ New Orleans					Smoothie King Center	–

January: 0–0 (home: 0–0; road: 0–0)

Game	Date	Team	Score	High points	High rebounds	High assists	Location Attendance	Record
35	January 2	@ Chicago					United Center	–
36	January 3	@ Toronto					Scotiabank Arena	–
37	January 5	@ Washington					Capital One Arena	–
38	January 7	Boston					Crypto.com Arena	–
39	January 8	Detroit					Crypto.com Arena	–
40	January 11	@ L.A. Clippers					Intuit Dome	–
41	January 13	@ Portland					Moda Center	–
42	January 14	Orlando					Crypto.com Arena	–
43	January 17	Milwaukee					Crypto.com Arena	–
44	January 19	@ Sacramento					Golden 1 Center	–
45	January 21	@ Golden State					Chase Center	–
46	January 22	Sacramento					Crypto.com Arena	–
47	January 24	Washington					Crypto.com Arena	–
48	January 26	Oklahoma City					Crypto.com Arena	–
49	January 28	@ Indiana					Gainbridge Fieldhouse	–
50	January 30	@ New York					Madison Square Garden	–
51	January 31	@ Charlotte					Spectrum Center	–

February: 0–0 (home: 0–0; road: 0–0)

Game	Date	Team	Score	High points	High rebounds	High assists	Location Attendance	Record
52	February 2	@ Boston					TD Garden	–
53	February 4	@ Brooklyn					Barclays Center	–
54	February 6	@ San Antonio					Frost Bank Center	–
55	February 8	@ Phoenix					Mortgage Matchup Center	–
56	February 10	L.A. Clippers					Crypto.com Arena	–
57	February 12	Denver					Crypto.com Arena	–
58	February 16	Chicago					Crypto.com Arena	–
59	February 18	Houston					Crypto.com Arena	–
All-Star Game
60	February 26	@ Denver					Ball Arena	–
61	February 28	@ Dallas					American Airlines Center	–

March: 0–0 (home: 0–0; road: 0–0)

Game	Date	Team	Score	High points	High rebounds	High assists	Location Attendance	Record
62	March 2	@ Orlando					Kia Center	–
63	March 4	@ Philadelphia					Xfinity Mobile Arena	–
64	March 6	Oklahoma City					Crypto.com Arena	–
65	March 7	Brooklyn					Crypto.com Arena	–
66	March 11	New York					Crypto.com Arena	–
67	March 12	Cleveland					Crypto.com Arena	–
68	March 14	Golden State					Crypto.com Arena	–
69	March 16	@ Portland					Moda Center	–
70	March 17	Phoenix					Crypto.com Arena	–
71	March 19	Atlanta					Crypto.com Arena	–
72	March 21	Dallas					Crypto.com Arena	–
73	March 23	@ Miami					Kaseya Center	–
74	March 25	@ Cleveland					Rocket Arena	–
75	March 28	@ Houston					Toyota Center	–
76	March 30	@ Memphis					FedExForum	–

April: 0–0 (home: 0–0; road: 0–0)

Game	Date	Team	Score	High points	High rebounds	High assists	Location Attendance	Record
77	April 1	@ Oklahoma City					Paycom Center	–
78	April 4	San Antonio					Crypto.com Arena	–
79	April 6	Dallas					Crypto.com Arena	–
80	April 7	Minnesota					Crypto.com Arena	–
81	April 9	Minnesota					Crypto.com Arena	–
82	April 11	Phoenix					Crypto.com Arena	–

2026–27 season schedule

== NBA Cup ==
=== West Group C ===
Pos	Team	Pld	W	L	PF	PA	PD	Qualification
1	San Antonio Spurs	2	2	0	247	194	+53	Advance to knockout stage
2	Los Angeles Lakers	3	2	1	325	334	−9	Possible knockout stage based on ranking
3	Portland Trail Blazers	2	1	1	238	231	+7	
4	Golden State Warriors	2	1	1	197	218	−21	
5	Sacramento Kings	3	0	3	320	350	−30	

Updated to game(s) played on November 20, 2026. Source:

== Transactions ==
=== Trades ===
Date	Trade		Ref.
June 24, 2026	Four-team trade		
June 24, 2026	To Los Angeles Lakers: Draft rights to Cameron Carr (No. 24) (from New York)	To Dallas Mavericks: Draft rights to Sergio de Larrea (from Los Angeles)	
June 24, 2026	To New York Knicks: Draft rights to Melvin Ajinça (2024 No. 51) (from Dallas); Draft rights to Chinemelu Elonu (2009 No. 59) (from Los Angeles); Draft rights to Louis Labeyrie (2014 No. 57) (from Los Angeles); Draft rights to Tyler Nickel (No. 47) (from Phoenix); 2029 PHX second-round pick (from Phoenix); 2030 PHI second-round pick (from Dallas); 2032 DAL second-round pick (from Dallas); 2033 PHX second-round pick (from Phoenix); Cash considerations (from Los Angeles); Cash considerations (from Phoenix)	To Phoenix Suns: Draft rights to Koa Peat (from Dallas)	
June 24, 2026	To Los Angeles Lakers: Draft rights to Vsevolod Ishchenko (No. 56)	To Chicago Bulls: Cash considerations	
June 24, 2026	To Los Angeles Lakers: Cash considerations	To Dallas Mavericks: Draft rights to Vsevolod Ishchenko (No. 56)	
July 7	To Los Angeles Lakers: Jaden Hardy; 2031 WAS second-round pick; 2032 WAS second-round pick	To Washington Wizards: Deandre Ayton	
July 8	To Los Angeles Lakers: Walker Kessler (sign-and-trade)	To Utah Jazz: 2028 first-round pick swap right; 2030 first-round pick swap right; 2031 LAL first-round pick; 2033 LAL first-round pick	

=== Free agency ===
==== Re-signed ====
Date	Player	Ref.
July 12, 2026	Austin Reaves	

==== Additions ====
Date	Player	Former Team	Ref.
July 7, 2026	Quentin Grimes	Philadelphia 76ers	
July 7, 2026	Jaden Hardy	Washington Wizards	
July 7, 2026	Sandro Mamukelashvili	San Antonio Spurs	
July 8, 2026	Walker Kessler	Utah Jazz	
July 12, 2026	Collin Sexton	Chicago Bulls	
July 13, 2026	Kevon Looney	New Orleans Pelicans	
July 19, 2026	Ziaire Williams	Brooklyn Nets	

==== Subtractions ====
Player	Reason	New Team	Ref.
Jaxson Hayes	Free agency	Utah Jazz	
Luke Kennard	Free agency	Phoenix Suns	
Marcus Smart	Free agency	Houston Rockets	
Rui Hachimura	Free agency	Los Angeles Clippers	
Deandre Ayton	Trade	Washington Wizards	
LeBron James	Free agency	Philadelphia 76ers	
