= 2026–27 Washington Wizards season =

Season of NBA team the Washington Wizards

- Head coach: Brian Keefe
- President: Michael Winger
- General manager: Will Dawkins
- Owner: Ted Leonsis
- Arena: Capital One Arena

Results
- Record: 6–11 (.353)
- Place: Division: 4th (Southeast); Conference: 10th (Eastern)
- Stats at Basketball Reference

Local media
- Television: Monumental Sports Network
- Radio: Federal News Radio; 106.7 The Fan

The 2026–27 Washington Wizards season is the 66th season of the franchise in the National Basketball Association (NBA) and 53rd in the Washington, D.C. area. After finishing with the worst record the previous season, the Wizards held the first overall pick in the 2026 NBA draft and selected AJ Dybantsa.

== Background ==
The Washington Wizards finished the previous season with a 17–65 record, the worst record in the NBA for the season, and the second worst in franchise history (after their 2023–24 season). Despite the Wizards' dreadful finish, the team largely kept their front office and management staff the same, though they did add Patrick Ewing and Cody Toppert as assistant coaches. Also, as a result of their bottom finish, the team was in the top 4 of the draft lottery, with a 14% chance of acquiring the #1 overall pick in the draft. On May 10, 2026, the Wizards lucked out and got the top pick in the draft, which would turn into AJ Dybantsa. In an interview with local CBS affiliate WUSA-9 in October, Bub Carrington said that “We’ve all, in a way, been held back just because, like you said, we were trying to get (No. 1 overall pick) AJ Dybantsa. That’s no secret. That’s no secret." Despite his allusion that the Wizards intentionally aimed for the worst record last season to get the top pick, the NBA declined to penalize Carrington or the Wizards organization.

After the NBA draft, the Wizards dug into their stash of draft capital accumulated from the previous few seasons, and made additional moves to build around their young core of Alex Sarr, Tre Johnson, Kyshawn George, Carrington, and Bilal Coulibaly, in addition to trades made at last season's deadline for veterans Trae Young and Anthony Davis. The latter two players largely stayed on the bench after being traded to heal from their respective injuries, but were expected to contribute at the start of this season. In July, the Wizards sent Jaden Hardy and a couple future second-round draft picks to the Los Angeles Lakers in exchange for Deandre Ayton. The following day, the Wizards inserted themselves into a six-team trade to re-acquire Khris Middleton the Dallas Mavericks (who was sent to Dallas last season as part of the package to acquire Davis) and a 2033 second-round pick, in exchange for sending D'Angelo Russell (another piece of the aforementioned trade, sent to Washington from Dallas, though he never played a minute) and three future second-round picks to the Memphis Grizzlies. In August, the Wizards inserted themselves in another multi-team trade deal, acquiring Tre Mann from the Orlando Magic, a second-round pick from the Los Angeles Clippers, and cash considerations from the Cleveland Cavaliers, in exchange for sending Cam Whitmore to Cleveland and Julian Reese to Denver.

With the roster largely set after these moves, the Wizards prepared to enter the season with a mission to actually win instead of intentionally underperforming for a draft pick, just in time before Adam Silver announced new rules taking effect in the next draft lottery. However, tragedy struck when Dybantsa rolled his ankle during the final preseason game, and was forced to miss the Wizards first four games while he recovered.

=== October ===
The Wizards began their season at their home court, Capital One Arena, against the Milwaukee Bucks. The team unveiled their starting lineup of Sarr at Center, Davis at Power Forward, Coulibaly at Small Forward, George at Shooting Guard, and Young at Point Guard. Despite falling behind early, the Wizards rallied in the fourth quarter and won the game, rallying behind Davis scoring 34 points and 12 rebounds on the night, with chants of "MVP!" reportedly coming from fans in the arena for him late in the game.

In Dybantsa's absence, Justin Champagnie stepped up and provided support on defense and the glass, getting a double-double with 11 points and the most rebounds of any player in the game (14) during the Wizards victory over the Bulls on October 24. Sadly, the following game, Champagnie suffered an injury and was taken out of the game, as the team was unable to catch up to the Hornets' attack led by Brandon Miller. When the team flew to Cleveland for the next game, Dybantsa was finally deemed healthy enough to play, and made his long awaited debut at Rocket Arena. Though the Wizards lost that game, Dybantsa led the team in scoring that night with 19 points. By the end of October, the Wizards finished with a 3-3 record, the fastest the team had gotten their first three wins in a season since the 2022-23 season.

== Draft picks ==
Round	Pick	Player	Position	Nationality	College
1	1	AJ Dybantsa	SF	United States	BYU
2	51	Izaiyah Nelson	PF/C	United States	South Florida
2	60	Malique Lewis	SF	Trinidad and Tobago	S.E. Melbourne Phoenix (Australia)

The Wizards entered the draft with one first-round selection, which landed first overall, and two second-round selections acquired through previous trades.

The Wizards won the first overall selection in the draft lottery after tying for the best odds with the worst record in the previous season. They used the pick to draft AJ Dybantsa. The Wizards' original second-round selection was traded to the Houston Rockets as an exchange for John Wall in 2020 and was eventually held by the New York Knicks, who used it to draft Bruce Thornton.

During the second night of the draft, the Wizards joined a three-team trade that sent the rights to the 51st pick Izaiyah Nelson to the Orlando Magic and the 60th pick Malique Lewis to the Milwaukee Bucks. In return, the Wizards received the rights to Felix Okpara, who was drafted 46th overall by Orlando.

== Roster ==
Washington Wizards roster
Players

Pos.	No.	Player	Height	Weight	DOB	From
C	8	Deandre Ayton	7 ft 0 in (2.13 m)	252 lb (114 kg)	1998-07-23	Arizona
G	26	Reece Beekman (injured) (TW)	6 ft 1 in (1.85 m)	190 lb (86 kg)	2001-10-08	Virginia
G	7	Bub Carrington	6 ft 4 in (1.93 m)	190 lb (86 kg)	2005-07-21	Pittsburgh
G/F	9	Justin Champagnie (injured)	6 ft 6 in (1.98 m)	206 lb (93 kg)	2001-06-29	Pittsburgh
G	0	Bilal Coulibaly	6 ft 7 in (2.01 m)	195 lb (88 kg)	2004-07-26	France
F/C	23	Anthony Davis	6 ft 10 in (2.08 m)	253 lb (115 kg)	1993-03-11	Kentucky
F	4	AJ Dybantsa	6 ft 9 in (2.06 m)	210 lb (95 kg)	2007-01-29	BYU
F	18	Kyshawn George	6 ft 8 in (2.03 m)	200 lb (91 kg)	2003-12-12	Miami (FL)
F	16	Anthony Gill	6 ft 7 in (2.01 m)	230 lb (104 kg)	1992-10-17	Virginia
G	12	Tre Johnson (injured)	6 ft 5 in (1.96 m)	190 lb (86 kg)	2006-03-07	Texas
G	1	Tre Mann	6 ft 4 in (1.93 m)	178 lb (81 kg)	2001-02-03	Florida
F	22	Khris Middleton	6 ft 7 in (2.01 m)	222 lb (101 kg)	1991-08-12	Texas A&M
C	34	Felix Okpara (TW)	6 ft 11 in (2.11 m)	235 lb (107 kg)	2004-04-20	Tennessee
F	27	Will Riley	6 ft 9 in (2.06 m)	180 lb (82 kg)	2006-02-10	Illinois
C	20	Alex Sarr	7 ft 0 in (2.13 m)	205 lb (93 kg)	2005-04-26	France
F	00	Tristan Vukčević (injured)	7 ft 0 in (2.13 m)	220 lb (100 kg)	2003-03-11	Serbia
F	5	Jamir Watkins (injured) (TW)	6 ft 5 in (1.96 m)	210 lb (95 kg)	2001-07-06	Florida State
G	3	Trae Young	6 ft 1 in (1.85 m)	164 lb (74 kg)	1998-09-19	Oklahoma

Coaches
Head coach
- Brian Keefe
Assistant(s)
- Alexis Ajinça
- Adam Caporn
- Patrick Ewing
- James Fraschilla
- J. J. Outlaw
- T. J. Sorrentine
- Cody Toppert
- David Vanterpool

Legend
- (DP) Unsigned draft pick
- (FA) Free agent
- (S) Suspended
- (GL) G League assignment
- (TW) Two-way affiliate player
- Injured

Roster
Updated: October 17, 2026

== Standings ==
=== Division ===
Southeast Division	W	L	PCT	GB	Home	Road	Div	GP
Miami Heat	9	6	.600	–	5‍–‍3	4‍–‍3	1–1	15
Atlanta Hawks	9	6	.600	–	3‍–‍3	6‍–‍3	4–1	15
Orlando Magic	6	8	.429	2.5	1‍–‍5	5‍–‍3	0–2	14
Washington Wizards	5	11	.313	4.5	2‍–‍5	3‍–‍6	2–3	16
Charlotte Hornets	4	10	.286	4.5	3‍–‍4	1‍–‍6	2–2	14

=== Conference ===
Eastern Conference
#	Team	W	L	PCT	GB	GP
1	Philadelphia 76ers *	13	3	.813	–	16
2	Boston Celtics	11	4	.733	1.5	15
3	Detroit Pistons *	10	4	.714	2.0	14
4	Miami Heat *	9	6	.600	3.5	15
5	Atlanta Hawks	9	6	.600	3.5	15
6	New York Knicks	9	6	.600	3.5	15
7	Cleveland Cavaliers	8	8	.500	5.0	16
8	Orlando Magic	6	8	.429	6.0	14
9	Toronto Raptors	5	10	.333	7.5	15
10	Indiana Pacers	5	10	.333	7.5	15
11	Washington Wizards	5	11	.313	8.0	16
12	Charlotte Hornets	4	10	.286	8.0	14
13	Chicago Bulls	4	10	.286	8.0	14
14	Brooklyn Nets	3	11	.214	9.0	14
15	Milwaukee Bucks	1	15	.063	12.0	16

== Game log ==
=== Preseason ===
2026 preseason game log
Total: 2–2 (Home: 1–1; Road: 1–1)
Preseason: 2–2 (home: 1–1; road: 1–1)

Game	Date	Team	Score	High points	High rebounds	High assists	Location Attendance	Record
1	October 8	@ New York	W 111–109	Anthony Davis (16)	Deandre Ayton (10)	Kyshawn George (5)	Madison Square Garden; 17,960	1–0
2	October 10	Detroit	W 114–108 (OT)	Johnson, Riley (15)	Anthony Davis (11)	Trae Young (8)	Capital One Arena; 10,791	2–0
3	October 12	Brooklyn	L 122–131	Kyshawn George (21)	Alex Sarr (9)	Trae Young (11)	Capital One Arena; 8,033	2–1
4	October 16	@ New Orleans	L 106–107	Davis, George (14)	Anthony Davis (11)	Trae Young (7)	Smoothie King Center	2–2

2026–27 preseason schedule

=== Regular season ===
2026–27 game log
Total: 6–11 (Home: 2–5; Road: 4–6)
October: 3–3 (home: 2–1; road: 1–2)

Game	Date	Team	Score	High points	High rebounds	High assists	Location Attendance	Record
1	October 21	Milwaukee	W 128–116	Anthony Davis (34)	Anthony Davis (12)	Trae Young (12)	Capital One Arena; 18,805	1–0
2	October 23	Toronto	L 102–112	Trae Young (22)	Anthony Davis (9)	Trae Young (12)	Capital One Arena; 18,952	1–1
3	October 24	@ Chicago	W 124–120	Trae Young (25)	Justin Champagnie (14)	Trae Young (9)	United Center; 21,496	2–1
4	October 26	@ Charlotte	L 103–110	Anthony Davis (29)	Anthony Davis (10)	Trae Young (10)	Spectrum Center; 17,949	2–2
5	October 28	@ Cleveland	L 111–121	AJ Dybantsa (19)	Davis, Young (5)	Kyshawn George (11)	Rocket Arena; 19,432	2–3
6	October 30	Charlotte	W 95–79	Anthony Davis (25)	Anthony Davis (12)	Trae Young (9)	Capital One Arena; 17,566	3–3

November: 3–8 (home: 0–4; road: 3–4)

Game	Date	Team	Score	High points	High rebounds	High assists	Location Attendance	Record
7	November 2	@ Orlando	W 103–94	Anthony Davis (27)	Anthony Davis (9)	Trae Young (7)	Kia Center; 19,240	4–3
8	November 4	Atlanta	L 105–120	Anthony Davis (26)	Anthony Davis (10)	Kyshawn George (7)	Capital One Arena; 16,974	4–4
9	November 6	@ Atlanta	L 132–139	Kyshawn George (33)	Deandre Ayton (11)	Trae Young (10)	State Farm Arena; 15,538	4–5
10	November 7	@ Oklahoma City	L 75–114	AJ Dybantsa (19)	Alex Sarr (14)	Kyshawn George (6)	Paycom Center; 18,203	4–6
11	November 9	@ Detroit	L 111–122	Anthony Davis (44)	Anthony Davis (13)	Trae Young (7)	Little Caesars Arena; 18,982	4–7
12	November 11	@ Indiana	L 101–114	Kyshawn George (25)	Anthony Davis (13)	Trae Young (4)	Gainbridge Fieldhouse; 16,679	4–8
13	November 12	Detroit	L 140–144 (2OT)	Trae Young (37)	Anthony Davis (15)	Trae Young (14)	Capital One Arena; 17,443	4–9
14	November 15	Houston	L 119–147	Alex Sarr (25)	Alex Sarr (9)	Trae Young (8)	Capital One Arena; 18,041	4–10
15	November 16	Memphis	L 120–136	Anthony Davis (23)	Kyshawn George (6)	Trae Young (12)	Capital One Arena; 16,307	4–11
16	November 18	@ Toronto	W 103–99	Anthony Davis (25)	Anthony Davis (14)	Trae Young (8)	Scotiabank Arena; 19,007	5–11
17	November 20	@ Chicago	W 98–94	Anthony Davis (36)	Anthony Davis (11)	AJ Dybantsa (6)	United Center	6–11
18	November 22	Orlando					Capital One Arena	–
19	November 24	Boston					Capital One Arena	–
20	November 28	Orlando					Capital One Arena	–
21	November 30	@ Charlotte					Spectrum Center	–

December: 0–0 (home: 0–0; road: 0–0)

Game	Date	Team	Score	High points	High rebounds	High assists	Location Attendance	Record
22	December 3	@ Miami					Kaseya Center	–
23	TBD	TBD					TBD	–
24	TBD	TBD					TBD	–
25	December 12	Charlotte					Capital One Arena	–
26	December 14	@ Boston					TD Garden	–
27	December 16	@ Boston					TD Garden	–
28	December 18	New York					Capital One Arena	–
29	December 20	@ Brooklyn					Barclays Center	–
30	December 22	Toronto					Capital One Arena	–
31	December 23	Cleveland					Capital One Arena	–
32	December 26	Portland					Capital One Arena	–
33	December 27	@ Cleveland					Rocket Arena	–
34	December 30	@ Toronto					Scotiabank Arena	–

January: 0–0 (home: 0–0; road: 0–0)

Game	Date	Team	Score	High points	High rebounds	High assists	Location Attendance	Record
35	January 1	San Antonio					Capital One Arena	–
36	January 3	L.A. Clippers					Capital One Arena	–
37	January 5	L.A. Lakers					Capital One Arena	–
38	January 7	Oklahoma City					Capital One Arena	–
39	January 8	Minnesota					Capital One Arena	–
40	January 11	Atlanta					Capital One Arena	–
41	January 12	@ Philadelphia					Xfinity Mobile Arena	–
42	January 15	@ Houston					Toyota Center	–
43	January 17	Indiana					Capital One Arena	–
44	January 18	Boston					Capital One Arena	–
45	January 21	@ Denver					Ball Arena	–
46	January 22	@ L.A. Clippers					Intuit Dome	–
47	January 24	@ L.A. Lakers					Crypto.com Arena	–
48	January 26	@ Portland					Moda Center	–
49	January 28	Sacramento					Capital One Arena	–
50	January 30	@ Indiana					Gainbridge Fieldhouse	–

February: 0–0 (home: 0–0; road: 0–0)

Game	Date	Team	Score	High points	High rebounds	High assists	Location Attendance	Record
51	February 1	@ Atlanta					State Farm Arena	–
52	February 4	New Orleans					Capital One Arena	–
53	February 6	@ Brooklyn					Barclays Center	–
54	February 8	Chicago					Capital One Arena	–
55	February 10	Miami					Capital One Arena	–
56	February 12	Brooklyn					Capital One Arena	–
57	February 13	Milwaukee					Capital One Arena	–
58	February 15	Phoenix					Capital One Arena	–
59	February 17	Miami					Capital One Arena	–
All-Star Game
60	February 25	@ Milwaukee					Fiserv Forum	–
61	February 27	@ Utah					Delta Center	–

March: 0–0 (home: 0–0; road: 0–0)

Game	Date	Team	Score	High points	High rebounds	High assists	Location Attendance	Record
62	March 1	@ Phoenix					Mortgage Matchup Center	–
63	March 2	@ Sacramento					Golden 1 Center	–
64	March 4	@ Golden State					Chase Center	–
65	March 6	Utah					Capital One Arena	–
66	March 9	@ San Antonio					Frost Bank Center	–
67	March 11	@ Dallas					American Airlines Center	–
68	March 14	@ Minnesota					Target Center	–
69	March 16	New York					Capital One Arena	–
70	March 18	Philadelphia					Capital One Arena	–
71	March 20	@ New York					Madison Square Garden	–
72	March 22	@ Milwaukee					Fiserv Forum	–
73	March 24	Denver					Capital One Arena	–
74	March 27	Golden State					Capital One Arena	–
75	March 28	Dallas					Capital One Arena	–
76	March 31	Chicago					Capital One Arena	–

April: 0–0 (home: 0–0; road: 0–0)

Game	Date	Team	Score	High points	High rebounds	High assists	Location Attendance	Record
77	April 2	Philadelphia					Capital One Arena	–
78	April 3	@ Orlando					Kia Center	–
79	April 5	@ New Orleans					Smoothie King Center	–
80	April 7	@ Memphis					FedExForum	–
81	April 9	@ Miami					Kaseya Center	–
82	April 11	Detroit					Capital One Arena	–

2026–27 season schedule

== NBA Cup ==
=== East Group C ===
Pos	Team	Pld	W	L	PF	PA	PD	Qualification
1	Boston Celtics	2	2	0	244	191	+53	Advance to knockout stage
2	Atlanta Hawks	3	2	1	360	339	+21	Possible knockout stage based on ranking
3	Washington Wizards	3	2	1	325	312	+13	
4	Chicago Bulls	3	1	2	315	333	−18	
5	Charlotte Hornets	3	0	3	256	325	−69	

Updated to game(s) played on November 20, 2026. Source:

== Transactions ==
=== Trades ===
Date	Trade		Ref.
June 24, 2026	Three-team trade		
June 24, 2026	To Washington Wizards: Draft rights to Felix Okpara (No. 46) (from Orlando)	To Milwaukee Bucks: Draft rights to Malique Lewis (No. 60) (from Washington)	
June 24, 2026	To Orlando Magic: Draft rights to Izaiyah Nelson (No. 51) (from Washington); Cash considerations (from Milwaukee)		
July 7, 2026	To Washington Wizards: Deandre Ayton	To Los Angeles Lakers: Jaden Hardy; 2031 second-round pick; 2032 second-round pick	
July 8, 2026	Six-team trade		
July 8, 2026	To Dallas Mavericks: Santi Aldama (from Memphis); Marcus Sasser (from Detroit); Draft rights to Tarik Biberović (2023 No. 56) (from Memphis)	To Detroit Pistons: John Collins (sign-and-trade) (from Los Angeles); Gary Harris (from Milwaukee); Taurean Prince (from Milwaukee); 2029 second-round pick (from Memphis); 2031 DAL second-round pick (from Memphis); 2032 DET second-round pick (from Memphis)	
July 8, 2026	To Los Angeles Clippers: 2028 protected second-round pick (from Detroit)	To Memphis Grizzlies: AJ Johnson (from Dallas); D'Angelo Russell (from Washington); Isaiah Stewart (from Detroit); 2030 GSW protected first-round pick (from Dallas); 2029 HOU second-round pick (from Dallas); 2029 LAL second-round pick (from Washington); 2032 second-round pick swap right (from Washington); 2033 WAS second-round pick (from Washington)	
July 8, 2026	To Milwaukee Bucks: Caris LeVert (from Detroit); 2027 MIL second-round pick (from Detroit); 2027 second-round pick (from Detroit); Cash considerations (from Los Angeles)	To Washington Wizards: Khris Middleton (sign-and-trade) (from Dallas); 2033 DAL second-round pick (from Dallas)	
August 20, 2026	Five-team trade		
August 20, 2026	To Charlotte Hornets: Dennis Schröder (from Cleveland); Cash considerations (from Cleveland)	To Cleveland Cavaliers: Peyton Watson (sign-and-trade) (from Denver); Cam Whitmore (from Washington); Draft rights to Ismaël Kamagate (2022 No. 46) (from Los Angeles)	
August 20, 2026	To Denver Nuggets: Julian Reese (two-way contract) (from Washington); 2031 CLE first-round pick (from Cleveland); 2032 SAC second-round pick (from Cleveland)	To Los Angeles Clippers: Max Strus (from Cleveland)	
August 20, 2026	To Washington Wizards: Tre Mann (from Charlotte); 2027 second-round pick (from Los Angeles); Cash considerations (from Cleveland)		

=== Free agency ===
==== Re-signed ====
Date re-signed	Player	Contract	Ref.
July 1, 2026	Jamir Watkins	Two-way contract	
September 15, 2026	Anthony Gill	One year	

==== Additions ====
Date signed	Player	Contract	Former team	Ref.
September 27, 2026	Reece Beekman	Two-way contract	Osceola Magic	

==== Subtractions ====
Date left	Player	Notes	New team	Ref.
July 1, 2026	Leaky Black	Waived		
