= 2026–27 New York Knicks season =

- Head coach: Mike Brown
- President: Leon Rose
- General manager: Gersson Rosas
- Owners: Madison Square Garden Sports
- Arena: Madison Square Garden

Results
- Record: 10–6 (.625)
- Place: Division: 3rd (Atlantic); Conference: 5th (Eastern)
- Stats at Basketball Reference

Local media
- Television: MSG TV
- Radio: WEPN-FM

The 2026–27 New York Knicks season is the 81st season of the franchise in the National Basketball Association (NBA). For the third time in franchise history and first time since 1974, the Knicks enter the season as the defending NBA champions, having defeated the San Antonio Spurs in five games in the previous year's NBA Finals, as well as the defending NBA Cup champions.

== Draft picks ==
Round	Pick	Player	Position	Nationality	College
1	24	Cameron Carr	SG	United States	Baylor
2	31	Bruce Thornton	PG	United States	Ohio State
2	55	Nick Martinelli	SF	United States	Northwestern

The Knicks entered the draft holding one first-round selection and two second-round selections. They retained their two original selections, while the additional second-round pick originally owned by the Washington Wizards, which the Knicks acquired from the Oklahoma City Thunder in 2022 in exchange for the draft rights to Ousmane Dieng. (Note: The pick was originally traded by the Wizards to the Houston Rockets in the John Wall-Russell Westbrook trade in 2020, and was top-14 protected in 2023, top-12 protected in 2024, top-10 protected in 2025, and top-8 protected in 2026. The pick was traded by the Rockets to the Oklahoma City Thunder in 2021 in exchange for the draft rights to Alperen Şengün. The pick conveyed into Washington's 2026 and 2027 second-round picks as the Wizards selected in the protected lottery range in the NBA draft between 2023 and 2026.)

== Roster ==
New York Knicks roster
Players

Pos.	No.	Player	Height	Weight	DOB	From
PG	14	Jaden Akins (TW)	6 ft 2 in (1.88 m)	195 lb (88 kg)	2003-02-25	Michigan State
G	5	Jose Alvarado	6 ft 0 in (1.83 m)	179 lb (81 kg)	1998-04-12	Georgia Tech
G/F	8	OG Anunoby	6 ft 7 in (2.01 m)	240 lb (109 kg)	1997-07-17	Indiana
G/F	25	Mikal Bridges	6 ft 6 in (1.98 m)	209 lb (95 kg)	1996-08-30	Villanova
G	11	Jalen Brunson	6 ft 2 in (1.88 m)	190 lb (86 kg)	1996-08-31	Villanova
G	00	Jordan Clarkson	6 ft 5 in (1.96 m)	194 lb (88 kg)	1992-06-07	Missouri
F	4	Pacôme Dadiet	6 ft 9 in (2.06 m)	210 lb (95 kg)	2005-07-27	France
F	51	Mohamed Diawara	6 ft 9 in (2.06 m)	225 lb (102 kg)	2005-04-29	France
C	0	Andre Drummond	6 ft 10 in (2.08 m)	279 lb (127 kg)	1993-08-10	Connecticut
G	3	Josh Hart	6 ft 5 in (1.96 m)	215 lb (98 kg)	1995-03-06	Villanova
F	1	Dalton Knecht (TW)	6 ft 6 in (1.98 m)	215 lb (98 kg)	2001-04-19	Tennessee
G	13	Tyler Kolek	6 ft 2 in (1.88 m)	195 lb (88 kg)	2001-03-27	Marquette
G	2	Miles McBride	6 ft 2 in (1.88 m)	195 lb (88 kg)	2000-09-08	West Virginia
F	55	Tyler Nickel (TW)	6 ft 7 in (2.01 m)	220 lb (100 kg)	2003-09-05	Vanderbilt
G	44	Landry Shamet	6 ft 5 in (1.96 m)	190 lb (86 kg)	1997-03-13	Wichita State
F/C	32	Karl-Anthony Towns	7 ft 0 in (2.13 m)	248 lb (112 kg)	1995-11-15	Kentucky
C	35	James Wiseman	7 ft 0 in (2.13 m)	240 lb (109 kg)	2001-03-31	Memphis

Coaches
Head coach
- Mike Brown
Assistant(s)
- Charles Allen
- Rick Brunson
- Mark Bryant
- Maurice Cheeks
- Darren Erman
- Riccardo Fois
- Chris Jent (associate HC)
- Billy Lange
- Brendan O'Connor

Legend
- (DP) Unsigned draft pick
- (FA) Free agent
- (S) Suspended
- (GL) On assignment to G League affiliate
- (TW) Two-way affiliate player
- Injured

Roster
Updated: October 23, 2026

== Standings ==
=== Division ===
Atlantic Division	W	L	PCT	GB	Home	Road	Div	GP
Philadelphia 76ers	14	3	.824	–	7‍–‍2	7‍–‍1	4–1	17
Boston Celtics	11	5	.688	2.5	6‍–‍1	5‍–‍4	4–0	16
New York Knicks	10	6	.625	3.5	5‍–‍3	5‍–‍3	3–3	16
Toronto Raptors	6	10	.375	7.5	2‍–‍6	4‍–‍4	0–4	16
Brooklyn Nets	3	12	.200	10.0	1‍–‍6	2‍–‍6	0–3	15

=== Conference ===
Eastern Conference
#	Team	W	L	PCT	GB	GP
1	Philadelphia 76ers *	14	3	.824	–	17
2	Boston Celtics	11	5	.688	2.5	16
3	Detroit Pistons *	10	5	.667	3.0	15
4	Atlanta Hawks *	10	6	.625	3.5	16
5	New York Knicks	10	6	.625	3.5	16
6	Miami Heat	9	6	.600	4.0	15
7	Cleveland Cavaliers	9	8	.529	5.0	17
8	Orlando Magic	7	8	.467	6.0	15
9	Toronto Raptors	6	10	.375	7.5	16
10	Washington Wizards	6	11	.353	8.0	17
11	Indiana Pacers	5	11	.313	8.5	16
12	Charlotte Hornets	4	11	.267	9.0	15
13	Chicago Bulls	4	11	.267	9.0	15
14	Brooklyn Nets	3	12	.200	10.0	15
15	Milwaukee Bucks	1	16	.059	13.0	17

== Game log ==
=== Preseason ===
2026 preseason game log
Total: 1–4 (Home: 1–2; Road: 0–2)
Preseason: 1–4 (home: 1–2; road: 0–2)

Game	Date	Team	Score	High points	High rebounds	High assists	Location Attendance	Record
1	October 5	@ Philadelphia	L 97–120	Anunoby, Brunson (12)	OG Anunoby (6)	Tyler Kolek (5)	Xfinity Mobile Arena; 19,746	0–1
2	October 8	Washington	L 109–111	Tied (13)	Andre Drummond (9)	Andre Drummond (4)	Madison Square Garden; 17,960	0–2
3	October 12	Minnesota	L 104–122	Jalen Brunson (20)	Jalen Brunson (5)	Kolek, Towns (4)	Madison Square Garden; 19,812	0–3
4	October 13	@ Toronto	L 94–148	James Wiseman (18)	James Wiseman (10)	Tyler Kolek (5)	Scotiabank Arena; 17,884	0–4
5	October 15	Toronto	W 122–120	Jalen Brunson (20)	Karl-Anthony Towns (15)	Karl-Anthony Towns (9)	Madison Square Garden; 19,812	1–4

2026–27 preseason schedule

=== Regular season ===
2026–27 game log
Total: 10–6 (Home: 5–3; Road: 5–3)
October: 2–4 (home: 1–2; road: 1–2)

Game	Date	Team	Score	High points	High rebounds	High assists	Location Attendance	Record
1	October 20	Philadelphia	L 100–106	Jalen Brunson (21)	Andre Drummond (14)	Drummond, Shamet (4)	Madison Square Garden; 19,812	0–1
2	October 23	@ Boston	L 103–107	Karl-Anthony Towns (22)	Josh Hart (12)	OG Anunoby (8)	TD Garden; 19,156	0–2
3	October 25	Orlando	L 102–111	Jalen Brunson (28)	Karl-Anthony Towns (14)	Tyler Kolek (9)	Madison Square Garden; 19,812	0–3
4	October 27	Detroit	W 111–97	Karl-Anthony Towns (27)	Karl-Anthony Towns (20)	Jalen Brunson (7)	Madison Square Garden; 19,812	1–3
5	October 28	@ Chicago	W 133–127	Jalen Brunson (38)	Karl-Anthony Towns (13)	Tyler Kolek (9)	United Center; 20,596	2–3
6	October 30	@ Philadelphia	L 93–98	Jalen Brunson (24)	Karl-Anthony Towns (12)	Jalen Brunson (6)	Xfinity Mobile Arena; 21,196	2–4

November: 8–2 (home: 4–1; road: 4–1)

Game	Date	Team	Score	High points	High rebounds	High assists	Location Attendance	Record
7	November 2	Brooklyn	W 103–90	Landry Shamet (20)	Karl-Anthony Towns (16)	Josh Hart (7)	Madison Square Garden; 19,812	3–4
8	November 4	Chicago	W 135–105	Jalen Brunson (33)	Karl-Anthony Towns (12)	Tyler Kolek (5)	Madison Square Garden; 19,812	4–4
9	November 7	@ Cleveland	W 109–97	Jalen Brunson (31)	Karl-Anthony Towns (13)	Jalen Brunson (9)	Rocket Arena; 19,432	5–4
10	November 10	Milwaukee	W 117–85	Jalen Brunson (23)	Karl-Anthony Towns (16)	Tyler Kolek (4)	Madison Square Garden; 19,812	6–4
11	November 11	Cleveland	L 107–115	Jalen Brunson (27)	Karl-Anthony Towns (11)	Karl-Anthony Towns (8)	Madison Square Garden; 19,812	6–5
12	November 13	@ Indiana	L 104–106	Jalen Brunson (33)	Karl-Anthony Towns (15)	Jalen Brunson (11)	Gainbridge Fieldhouse; 17,274	6–6
13	November 15	@ Toronto	W 112–108 (OT)	Brunson, Towns (28)	Karl-Anthony Towns (17)	Jalen Brunson (9)	Scotiabank Arena; 19,800	7–6
14	November 17	@ Toronto	W 111–102	Jalen Brunson (31)	Karl-Anthony Towns (16)	Karl-Anthony Towns (8)	Scotiabank Arena; 19,800	8–6
15	November 19	@ Minnesota	W 102–99	Karl-Anthony Towns (22)	Karl-Anthony Towns (12)	Jalen Brunson (7)	Target Center	9–6
16	November 21	Portland	W 97–96	Jalen Brunson (30)	Andre Drummond (13)	Josh Hart (6)	Madison Square Garden; 19,812	10–6
17	November 22	Indiana					Madison Square Garden	–
18	November 25	Cleveland					Madison Square Garden	–
19	November 27	Miami					Madison Square Garden	–
20	November 29	Atlanta					Madison Square Garden	–

December: 0–0 (home: 0–0; road: 0–0)

Game	Date	Team	Score	High points	High rebounds	High assists	Location Attendance	Record
21	December 1	@ Chicago					United Center	–
22	December 2	@ Milwaukee					Fiserv Forum	–
23	TBD	TBD					TBD	–
24	TBD	TBD					TBD	–
25	December 12	@ Miami					Kaseya Center	–
26	December 14	@ Houston					Toyota Center	–
27	December 16	@ New Orleans					Smoothie King Center	–
28	December 18	@ Washington					Capital One Arena	–
29	December 21	@ Cleveland					Rocket Arena	–
30	December 23	Utah					Madison Square Garden	–
31	December 25	San Antonio					Madison Square Garden	–
32	December 27	Brooklyn					Madison Square Garden	–
33	December 30	@ Utah					Delta Center	–
34	December 31	@ Phoenix					Mortgage Matchup Center	–

January: 0–0 (home: 0–0; road: 0–0)

Game	Date	Team	Score	High points	High rebounds	High assists	Location Attendance	Record
35	January 2	@ Denver					Ball Arena	–
36	January 4	@ Portland					Moda Center	–
37	January 6	@ Golden State					Chase Center	–
38	January 8	@ Sacramento					Golden 1 Center	–
39	January 11	Denver					Madison Square Garden	–
40	January 13	@ Boston					TD Garden	–
41	January 14	Miami					Madison Square Garden	–
42	January 16	Dallas					Madison Square Garden	–
43	January 18	Minnesota					Madison Square Garden	–
44	January 20	Toronto					Madison Square Garden	–
45	January 22	@ Atlanta					State Farm Arena	–
46	January 24	L.A. Clippers					Madison Square Garden	–
47	January 26	Phoenix					Madison Square Garden	–
48	January 28	Atlanta					Madison Square Garden	–
49	January 30	L.A. Lakers					Madison Square Garden	–

February: 0–0 (home: 0–0; road: 0–0)

Game	Date	Team	Score	High points	High rebounds	High assists	Location Attendance	Record
50	February 1	@ Brooklyn					Barclays Center	–
51	February 3	@ Detroit					Little Caesars Arena	–
52	February 4	Toronto					Madison Square Garden	–
53	February 7	@ Oklahoma City					Paycom Center	–
54	February 9	Charlotte					Madison Square Garden	–
55	February 11	@ Philadelphia					Xfinity Mobile Arena	–
56	February 13	Golden State					Madison Square Garden	–
57	February 15	@ Memphis					FedExForum	–
58	February 17	@ Detroit					Little Caesars Arena	–
All-Star Game
59	February 25	Oklahoma City					Madison Square Garden	–
60	February 27	Philadelphia					Madison Square Garden	–
61	February 28	Milwaukee					Madison Square Garden	–

March: 0–0 (home: 0–0; road: 0–0)

Game	Date	Team	Score	High points	High rebounds	High assists	Location Attendance	Record
62	March 2	Memphis					Madison Square Garden	–
63	March 4	@ Dallas					American Airlines Center	–
64	March 7	@ San Antonio					Frost Bank Center	–
65	March 10	@ L.A. Clippers					Intuit Dome	–
66	March 11	@ L.A. Lakers					Crypto.com Arena	–
67	March 14	Boston					Madison Square Garden	–
68	March 16	@ Washington					Capital One Arena	–
69	March 17	Sacramento					Madison Square Garden	–
70	March 20	Washington					Madison Square Garden	–
71	March 23	New Orleans					Madison Square Garden	–
72	March 24	Houston					Madison Square Garden	–
73	March 26	@ Charlotte					Spectrum Center	–
74	March 28	@ Orlando					Kia Center	–
75	March 30	@ Orlando					Kia Center	–

April: 0–0 (home: 0–0; road: 0–0)

Game	Date	Team	Score	High points	High rebounds	High assists	Location Attendance	Record
76	April 1	Charlotte					Madison Square Garden	–
77	April 2	@ Brooklyn					Barclays Center	–
78	April 4	Boston					Madison Square Garden	–
79	April 6	@ Atlanta					State Farm Arena	–
80	April 8	@ Milwaukee					Fiserv Forum	–
81	April 9	Detroit					Madison Square Garden	–
82	April 11	Indiana					Madison Square Garden	–

2026–27 season schedule

== NBA Cup ==
=== East Group B ===
Pos	Team	Pld	W	L	PF	PA	PD	Qualification
1	Miami Heat	2	2	0	278	246	+32	Advance to knockout stage
2	Cleveland Cavaliers	3	2	1	368	347	+21	Possible knockout stage based on ranking
3	Philadelphia 76ers	2	1	1	193	212	−19	
4	Indiana Pacers	3	1	2	350	377	−27	
5	New York Knicks	2	0	2	197	204	−7	

Updated to game(s) played on November 20, 2026. Source:

== Transactions ==
=== Trades ===
Date	Trade		Ref.
June 24, 2026	Four-team trade		
June 24, 2026	To New York Knicks: Draft rights to Melvin Ajinça (2024 No. 51) (from Dallas); Draft rights to Chinemelu Elonu (2009 No. 59) (from Los Angeles); Draft rights to Louis Labeyrie (2014 No. 57) (from Los Angeles); 2026 PHI second-round pick (No. 47) (from Phoenix); 2029 PHX second-round pick (from Phoenix); 2030 PHI second-round pick (from Dallas); 2032 DAL second-round pick (from Dallas); 2033 PHX second-round pick (from Phoenix); Cash considerations (from Los Angeles); Cash considerations (from Phoenix)	To Dallas Mavericks: Draft rights to Sergio de Larrea (from Los Angeles)	
June 24, 2026	To Los Angeles Lakers: Draft rights to Cameron Carr (from New York)	To Phoenix Suns: Draft rights to Koa Peat (from Dallas)	
June 24, 2026	To New York Knicks: Cash considerations	To Detroit Pistons: Draft rights to Ugonna Onyenso (No. 53)	
June 24, 2026	To New York Knicks: Draft rights to Jack Kayil (No. 39); Draft rights to Ugonna Onyenso (No. 53); Draft rights to Mojave King (2023 No. 47); 2029 SAC second-round pick	To Houston Rockets: Draft rights to Bruce Thornton (No. 31); Draft rights to Nick Martinelli (No. 55) (Note: Houston flipped his rights to the Los Angeles Clippers for cash considerations.)	

=== Free agency ===
==== Re-signed ====
Player	Date	Ref.
Jose Alvarado	July 6, 2026	
Mohamed Diawara	July 6, 2026	
Landry Shamet	July 6, 2026	
Jordan Clarkson	July 10, 2026	

==== Additions ====
Player	Former Team	Date	Ref.
Andre Drummond	Philadelphia 76ers	July 6, 2026	
James Wiseman	Free agency	September 16, 2026	

==== Subtractions ====
Player	Reason	New Team	Date	Ref.
Mitchell Robinson	Free agency	Boston Celtics	July 6, 2026	
Ariel Hukporti	Free agency	Philadelphia 76ers	July 6, 2026	
Jeremy Sochan	Free agency	Portland Trail Blazers	August 2, 2026	
