= 2026–27 Memphis Grizzlies season =

- Head coach: Tuomas Iisalo
- President: Jason Wexler
- General manager: Zach Kleiman
- Owner: Robert Pera
- Arena: FedExForum

Results
- Record: 12–5 (.706)
- Place: Division: 3rd (Southwest); Conference: 5th (Western)
- Stats at Basketball Reference

Local media
- Television: DAZN
- Radio: WMFS-FM

The 2026–27 Memphis Grizzlies season is the 32nd season of the franchise in the National Basketball Association (NBA) and 26th in Memphis. During this offseason period of theirs on May 11, 2026, longtime Grizzlies power forward Brandon Clarke would unexpectedly die due to a (likely) drug overdose. Despite the circumstances, Memphis would still enter the season with two first round picks, including a top 3 selection that would be used to draft Cameron Boozer, and are looking to return to the NBA playoffs after previously missing the 2026 NBA playoffs due to severe injury problems, amongst other issues at hand. This will be the first time since the 2018-19 season that Ja Morant is not on the opening day roster, as he was traded to the Portland Trail Blazers on June 29.

The Grizzlies opened the season with six consecutive wins, tying their best start in franchise history set in 2014–15.

== Draft picks ==
Round	Pick	Player	Position	Nationality	College
1	3	Cameron Boozer	PF	United States	Duke
1	16	Bennett Stirtz	PG	United States	Iowa
2	32	Richie Saunders	SG	United States	BYU

The Grizzlies entered the draft holding two first-round selections and one second-round selection. Their own first-round selection jumped into the top three as a result of the NBA draft lottery, while their remaining selections were acquired via previous trades with conditions tied to the 2025–26 regular season standings. They had traded their own second-round selection to the Utah Jazz in 2021 and was eventually used by the Los Angeles Clippers in the draft, as the pick fell outside its 43rd-to-60th protection range due to the Grizzlies' poor finish in the 2025–26 season.

== Roster ==
Memphis Grizzlies roster
Players

Pos.	No.	Player	Height	Weight	DOB	From
F	27	Cameron Boozer	6 ft 8 in (2.03 m)	250 lb (113 kg)	2007-07-18	Duke
G	23	Cedric Coward	6 ft 6 in (1.98 m)	206 lb (93 kg)	2003-09-11	Washington State
C	14	Zach Edey	7 ft 4 in (2.24 m)	305 lb (138 kg)	2002-05-14	Purdue
F	3	Jerami Grant	6 ft 7 in (2.01 m)	213 lb (97 kg)	1994-03-12	Syracuse
F	22	Taylor Hendricks	6 ft 9 in (2.06 m)	215 lb (98 kg)	2003-11-22	Central Florida
F	45	GG Jackson (injured)	6 ft 9 in (2.06 m)	210 lb (95 kg)	2004-12-17	South Carolina
G/F	2	Ty Jerome	6 ft 5 in (1.96 m)	195 lb (88 kg)	1997-07-08	Virginia
F	35	Karim López	6 ft 8 in (2.03 m)	210 lb (95 kg)	2007-04-12	Mexico
G	21	Jahmai Mashack (TW)	6 ft 4 in (1.93 m)	203 lb (92 kg)	2002-11-10	Tennessee
F	17	Kris Murray	6 ft 8 in (2.03 m)	218 lb (99 kg)	2000-08-19	Iowa
G	1	Scotty Pippen Jr. (injured)	6 ft 1 in (1.85 m)	170 lb (77 kg)	2000-11-10	Vanderbilt
C	41	Quinten Post	7 ft 0 in (2.13 m)	238 lb (108 kg)	2000-03-21	Boston College
F	18	Olivier-Maxence Prosper	6 ft 7 in (2.01 m)	230 lb (104 kg)	2002-07-03	Marquette
G	5	Richie Saunders (injured) (TW)	6 ft 5 in (1.96 m)	200 lb (91 kg)	2001-09-19	BYU
G	10	Javon Small (TW)	6 ft 1 in (1.85 m)	190 lb (86 kg)	2002-12-19	West Virginia
G	24	Cam Spencer	6 ft 3 in (1.91 m)	205 lb (93 kg)	2000-04-06	Connecticut
F/C	28	Isaiah Stewart	6 ft 8 in (2.03 m)	250 lb (113 kg)	2001-05-22	Washington
F	0	Jaylen Wells	6 ft 7 in (2.01 m)	205 lb (93 kg)	2003-08-26	Washington State

Coaches
Head coach
- Tuomas Iisalo
Assistant(s)
- Darnell Lazare
- Jason March
- Ryan Saunders (lead assistant)
- Erick Schmidt

Legend
- (DP) Unsigned draft pick
- (FA) Free agent
- (S) Suspended
- (GL) On assignment to G League affiliate
- (TW) Two-way affiliate player
- Injured

Roster
Updated: November 7, 2026

== Standings ==
=== Division ===
Southwest Division	W	L	PCT	GB	Home	Road	Div	GP
San Antonio Spurs	13	3	.813	–	6‍–‍3	7‍–‍0	2–1	16
Memphis Grizzlies	12	4	.750	1.0	4‍–‍4	8‍–‍0	1–1	16
Houston Rockets	12	5	.706	1.5	7‍–‍1	5‍–‍4	2–1	17
Dallas Mavericks	8	7	.533	4.5	6‍–‍2	2‍–‍5	1–3	15
New Orleans Pelicans	5	12	.294	8.5	4‍–‍7	1‍–‍5	1–1	17

=== Conference ===
Western Conference
#	Team	W	L	PCT	GB	GP
1	Los Angeles Lakers *	14	3	.824	–	17
2	San Antonio Spurs *	13	3	.813	0.5	16
3	Memphis Grizzlies	12	4	.750	1.5	16
4	Houston Rockets	12	5	.706	2.0	17
5	Minnesota Timberwolves *	11	5	.688	2.5	16
6	Portland Trail Blazers	10	5	.667	3.0	15
7	Denver Nuggets	9	5	.643	3.5	14
8	Oklahoma City Thunder	10	6	.625	3.5	16
9	Phoenix Suns	8	7	.533	5.0	15
10	Dallas Mavericks	8	7	.533	5.0	15
11	Golden State Warriors	8	8	.500	5.5	16
12	New Orleans Pelicans	5	12	.294	9.0	17
13	Los Angeles Clippers	4	10	.286	8.5	14
14	Utah Jazz	3	14	.176	11.0	17
15	Sacramento Kings	1	14	.067	12.0	15

== Game log ==
=== Preseason ===
2026 preseason game log
Total: 3–1 (Home: 1–1; Road: 2–0)
Preseason: 3–1 (home: 1–1; road: 2–0)

Game	Date	Team	Score	High points	High rebounds	High assists	Location Attendance	Record
1	October 5	@ Atlanta	W 132–123	GG Jackson (14)	Taylor Hendricks (6)	Ty Jerome (5)	State Farm Arena; 10,923	1–0
2	October 7	Orlando	L 118–122	Ty Jerome (17)	Boozer, Jackson (6)	Cam Spencer (5)	FedExForum; 10,007	1–1
3	October 9	@ Chicago	W 104–100	Ty Jerome (16)	Karim López (6)	Jerome, Spencer (4)	United Center; 18,966	2–1
4	October 16	Charlotte	W 117–98	Cameron Boozer (19)	Cameron Boozer (7)	Tied (4)	FedExForum; 10,087	3–1

2026–27 preseason schedule

=== Regular season ===
2026–27 game log
Total: 12–5 (Home: 4–4; Road: 8–1)
October: 6–0 (home: 2–0; road: 4–0)

Game	Date	Team	Score	High points	High rebounds	High assists	Location Attendance	Record
1	October 21	Utah	W 123–103	Ty Jerome (45)	Cameron Boozer (11)	Ty Jerome (6)	FedExForum; 17,276	1–0
2	October 23	@ Golden State	W 111–108	Ty Jerome (28)	Cameron Boozer (13)	Cameron Boozer (6)	Chase Center; 18,064	2–0
3	October 25	@ Sacramento	W 123–112	Ty Jerome (31)	Boozer, Coward (11)	Ty Jerome (6)	Golden 1 Center; 13,076	3–0
4	October 26	@ Utah	W 110–105	Cedric Coward (16)	Cedric Coward (11)	Ty Jerome (8)	Delta Center; 17,867	4–0
5	October 29	@ Portland	W 124–103	Boozer, Stewart (18)	Cameron Boozer (11)	Cameron Boozer (12)	Moda Center; 19,367	5–0
6	October 31	Sacramento	W 136–105	Cameron Boozer (27)	Cameron Boozer (9)	Cam Spencer (13)	FedExForum; 15,060	6–0

November: 6–5 (home: 2–4; road: 4–1)

Game	Date	Team	Score	High points	High rebounds	High assists	Location Attendance	Record
7	November 2	New Orleans	L 134–135 (OT)	Ty Jerome (40)	Tied (9)	Cam Spencer (7)	FedExForum; 13,322	6–1
8	November 4	Indiana	L 103–107	Coward, Jerome (23)	Zach Edey (13)	Cam Spencer (9)	FedExForum; 13,464	6–2
9	November 6	Oklahoma City	L 97–128	Ty Jerome (21)	Cameron Boozer (12)	Ty Jerome (5)	FedExForum; 16,197	6–3
10	November 9	@ Toronto	W 118–102	Ty Jerome (27)	Zach Edey (9)	Cameron Boozer (8)	Scotiabank Arena; 19,106	7–3
11	November 11	Denver	L 118–123	Jerome, Wells (22)	Boozer, Coward (11)	Boozer, Jerome (5)	FedExForum; 13,917	7–4
12	November 13	@ New Orleans	W 142–111	Jerami Grant (22)	Taylor Hendricks (12)	Ty Jerome (9)	Smoothie King Center; 16,487	8–4
13	November 14	Brooklyn	W 129–110	Cedric Coward (23)	Cedric Coward (23)	Cam Spencer (8)	FedExForum; 15,103	9–4
14	November 16	@ Washington	W 136–120	Cameron Boozer (29)	Zach Edey (10)	Javon Small (12)	Capital One Arena; 16,307	10–4
15	November 18	@ Cleveland	W 124–121	Cam Spencer (26)	Cameron Boozer (8)	Cam Spencer (7)	Rocket Arena; 19,432	11–4
16	November 19	Golden State	W 126–98	Jaylen Wells (22)	Jaylen Wells (7)	Cam Spencer (11)	FedExForum; 15,014	12–4
17	November 21	@ Minnesota	L 95–104	Cedric Coward (23)	Cedric Coward (7)	Ty Jerome (6)	Target Center	12–5
18	November 23	@ Charlotte					Spectrum Center	–
19	November 25	L.A. Clippers					FedExForum	–
20	November 27	@ Minnesota					Target Center	–
21	November 29	L.A. Lakers					FedExForum	–

December: 0–0 (home: 0–0; road: 0–0)

Game	Date	Team	Score	High points	High rebounds	High assists	Location Attendance	Record
22	December 1	@ Philadelphia					Xfinity Mobile Arena	–
23	December 2	@ Detroit					Little Caesars Arena	–
24	TBD	TBD					TBD	–
25	TBD	TBD					TBD	–
26	December 12	Milwaukee					FedExForum	–
27	December 14	Golden State					FedExForum	–
28	December 16	Miami					FedExForum	–
29	December 18	Houston					FedExForum	–
30	December 20	Phoenix					FedExForum	–
31	December 21	@ New Orleans					Smoothie King Center	–
32	December 23	Toronto					FedExForum	–
33	December 26	@ L.A. Clippers					Intuit Dome	–
34	December 27	@ L.A. Lakers					Crypto.com Arena	–
35	December 29	San Antonio					FedExForum	–

January: 0–0 (home: 0–0; road: 0–0)

Game	Date	Team	Score	High points	High rebounds	High assists	Location Attendance	Record
36	January 3	@ Orlando					Kia Center	–
37	January 5	@ Miami					Kaseya Center	–
38	January 7	@ Houston					Toyota Center	–
39	January 8	@ San Antonio					Frost Bank Center	–
40	January 10	Dallas					FedExForum	–
41	January 12	Dallas					FedExForum	–
42	January 14	@ Denver					Ball Arena	–
43	January 16	Cleveland					FedExForum	–
44	January 18	Houston					FedExForum	–
45	January 20	@ Phoenix					Mortgage Matchup Center	–
46	January 22	@ Oklahoma City					Paycom Center	–
47	January 25	Minnesota					FedExForum	–
48	January 28	@ Oklahoma City					Paycom Center	–
49	January 30	@ Utah					Delta Center	–

February: 0–0 (home: 0–0; road: 0–0)

Game	Date	Team	Score	High points	High rebounds	High assists	Location Attendance	Record
50	February 1	@ Milwaukee					Fiserv Forum	–
51	February 3	Philadelphia					FedExForum	–
52	February 6	Portland					FedExForum	–
53	February 8	Portland					FedExForum	–
54	February 10	Orlando					FedExForum	–
55	February 12	L.A. Clippers					FedExForum	–
56	February 15	New York					FedExForum	–
57	February 17	San Antonio					FedExForum	–
58	February 18	Boston					FedExForum	–
All-Star Game
59	February 26	@ San Antonio					Frost Bank Center	–
60	February 27	Sacramento					FedExForum	–

March: 0–0 (home: 0–0; road: 0–0)

Game	Date	Team	Score	High points	High rebounds	High assists	Location Attendance	Record
61	March 2	@ New York					Madison Square Garden	–
62	March 4	@ Atlanta					State Farm Arena	–
63	March 6	New Orleans					FedExForum	–
64	March 8	Atlanta					FedExForum	–
65	March 9	@ Dallas					American Airlines Center	–
66	March 11	@ Boston					TD Garden	–
67	March 13	@ Chicago					United Center	–
68	March 15	Phoenix					FedExForum	–
69	March 17	@ Golden State					Chase Center	–
70	March 18	@ L.A. Clippers					Intuit Dome	–
71	March 20	Oklahoma City					FedExForum	–
72	March 22	Charlotte					FedExForum	–
73	March 24	@ Indiana					Gainbridge Fieldhouse	–
74	March 25	Chicago					FedExForum	–
75	March 28	@ Brooklyn					Barclays Center	–
76	March 30	L.A. Lakers					FedExForum	–

April: 0–0 (home: 0–0; road: 0–0)

Game	Date	Team	Score	High points	High rebounds	High assists	Location Attendance	Record
77	April 2	@ Houston					Toyota Center	–
78	April 4	@ Denver					Ball Arena	–
79	April 6	Detroit					FedExForum	–
80	April 7	Washington					FedExForum	–
81	April 9	@ Phoenix					Mortgage Matchup Center	–
82	April 11	@ Dallas					American Airlines Center	–

2026–27 season schedule

== NBA Cup ==
=== West Group B ===
Pos	Team	Pld	W	L	PF	PA	PD	Qualification
1	Minnesota Timberwolves	2	2	0	242	210	+32	Advance to knockout stage
2	Oklahoma City Thunder	3	2	1	366	330	+36	Possible knockout stage based on ranking
3	Memphis Grizzlies	2	1	1	239	239	0	
4	Los Angeles Clippers	2	1	1	214	239	−25	
5	New Orleans Pelicans	3	0	3	340	383	−43	

Updated to game(s) played on November 20, 2026. Source:

== Transactions ==
=== Overview ===
Players Added

Via draft

- Cameron Boozer (2026 No. 3)
- Karim López (2026 No. 21) (from Detroit)
- Richie Saunders (2026 No. 32)

Via free agency

- Quinten Post

Via trade

- AJ Johnson
- D'Angelo Russell
- Isaiah Stewart
- Jerami Grant
- Kris Murray
Players Lost

Via trade

- Ja Morant
- Santi Aldama
- Draft rights to Tarik Biberović (2023 No. 56)

Via draft

- Bennett Stirtz (2026 No. 16) (to OKC)
- Ebuka Okorie (2026 No. 17) (to Detroit)

Via free agency

- TBD

Via retirement

- TBD

Waived

- Kentavious Caldwell-Pope (to Philadelphia)

=== Trades ===
Date	Trade		Ref.
June 23, 2026	To Memphis Grizzlies: Draft rights to Ebuka Okorie (No. 17) (Note: Memphis flipped Okorie's rights to Detroit.); 2030 second-round pick (Note: The most favorable of the picks originally belonging to Denver, Houston, and Miami.); 2033 OKC second-round pick	To Oklahoma City Thunder: Draft rights to Bennett Stirtz (No. 16)	
June 24, 2026	To Memphis Grizzlies: Draft rights to Karim López (No. 21); 2029 second-round pick (Note: The most favorable of the picks originally belonging to Detroit, Milwaukee, and New York.) (Note: Detroit agreed to trade this pick to Memphis during the first round for the draft rights to Ebuka Okorie and during the second round the next night agreed to send it back to Detroit for Isaiah Stewart in a trade not yet made official.); 2031 DAL second-round pick; 2032 DET second-round pick	To Detroit Pistons: Draft rights to Ebuka Okorie	
June 29, 2026	To Memphis Grizzlies: Jerami Grant; Kris Murray	To Portland Trail Blazers: Ja Morant; Cash considerations	
July 8, 2026	Six-team trade		
July 8, 2026	To Dallas Mavericks: Santi Aldama (from Memphis); Marcus Sasser (from Detroit); Draft rights to Tarik Biberović (2023 No. 56) (from Memphis)	To Detroit Pistons: John Collins (sign-and-trade) (from Los Angeles); Gary Harris (from Milwaukee); Taurean Prince (from Milwaukee); 2029 second-round pick (from Memphis); 2031 DAL second-round pick (from Memphis); 2032 DET second-round pick (from Memphis)	
July 8, 2026	To Los Angeles Clippers: 2028 protected second-round pick (Note: Los Angeles will receive the pick if falls No. 56–60.) (from Detroit)	To Memphis Grizzlies: AJ Johnson (from Dallas); D'Angelo Russell (from Washington); Isaiah Stewart (from Detroit); 2030 GSW protected first-round pick (Note: Memphis will receive the pick if falls No. 21–30; if it falls No. 1–20, Memphis will receive Golden State's own 2030 second-round pick.) (from Dallas); 2029 HOU second-round pick (from Dallas); 2029 LAL second-round pick (from Washington); 2032 second-round pick swap right (Note: Memphis may swap the more favorable of their own pick and the pick originally belonging to Philadelphia for the pick originally belonging to Utah.) (from Washington); 2033 WAS second-round pick (from Washington)	
July 8, 2026	To Milwaukee Bucks: Caris LeVert (from Detroit); 2027 MIL second-round pick (Note: Milwaukee traded this pick away in a previous transaction.) (from Detroit); 2027 second-round pick (Note: The less favorable of the picks originally belonging to Brooklyn and Dallas.) (from Detroit); Cash considerations (from Los Angeles)	To Washington Wizards: Khris Middleton (sign-and-trade) (from Dallas); 2033 DAL second-round pick (from Dallas)	

=== Free agency ===
==== Re-signed ====
Date	Player	Ref.

==== Additions ====
Date	Player	Reason	Former Team	Ref.
July 8, 2026	Quinten Post	Free agency	Golden State Warriors	

==== Subtractions ====
Player	Reason	New Team	Date	Ref.
Brandon Clarke	Deceased		May 11, 2026	
