= 2026–27 Phoenix Suns season =

- Head coach: Jordan Ott
- General manager: Brian Gregory
- Owner(s): Mat Ishbia & Justin Ishbia
- Arena: Mortgage Matchup Center

Results
- Record: 8–7 (.533)
- Place: Division: 2nd (Pacific); Conference: 10th (Western)
- Stats at Basketball Reference

Local media
- Television: Arizona's Family Sports (Note: KTVK, KPHO-TV, KOLD-TV, KPHE-LD, KAZF, KAZS); FuboTV (Note: Albuquerque, New Mexico); Kiswe (Suns Live)
- Radio: KTAR

The 2026–27 Phoenix Suns season is the 59th season of the franchise in the National Basketball Association (NBA), as well as their 34th season at the Mortgage Matchup Center. It is also their fourth full season under the ownership group led by Mat Ishbia and Justin Ishbia after the brothers purchased the team on February 8, 2023. Entering the season, the Suns will look to not only enter the NBA playoffs for the sixth time in seven straight seasons, but also win their first playoff game since 2023 as well. The Suns will also host the 2027 NBA All-Star Game at the Mortgage Matchup Center, with this being the fourth NBA All-Star Game hosted in Phoenix, Arizona.

== Draft picks ==
Round	Pick	Player	Position(s)	Nationality	College / Club
2	47	Tyler Nickel	Small Forward	United States	Vanderbilt

The Suns initially entered the draft holding only one second-round selection. They originally held the rights to multiple other draft picks this time around, but those selections were traded away thanks to multiple trades throughout previous seasons, most notably through an infamous trade involving Bradley Beal (though that first round pick for the year ultimately went to the Memphis Grizzlies instead through a complex series of trades), with the placement of the second round pick they did acquire in this year's draft coming through a multi-team trade process that involved the Philadelphia 76ers being the team that Phoenix would get their second round selection from instead of their own second round pick that actually had the same record that Philadelphia did this previous season, but ironically being one spot lower than the pick that had originally belonged to the Suns ultimately gotten them in the end.

By the end of the first night of the draft, the Suns would get involved with a surprise four-team trade with the Dallas Mavericks, the Los Angeles Lakers, and the defending champion New York Knicks, with the Suns trading away three second-round picks (including the 47th pick of the draft, which became Tyler Nickel from Vanderbilt University and the since-available 2033 second-round pick) and cash considerations to the Knicks while acquiring the 30th pick of the draft (the last pick of the first round) from Dallas, with the Mavericks acquiring the 25th pick from the Knicks in the process and the Lakers moving up a spot for the 24th pick in the draft. As such, the first-round pick the Suns acquired to end the first night of the 2026 NBA draft would be the selection of Gilbert, Arizona native forward Koa Peat from the University of Arizona. As someone that had previously been considered a lottery selection early on during his freshman season at the University of Arizona, Peat became a key figure in helping Arizona reach the Final Four of the 2026 NCAA Tournament, with his averages of 14.1 points, 5.6 rebounds, and 2.6 assists resulting in him being a member of both the All-Big 12 Third Team and the Big 12's All-Freshmen Team this season.

== Free agency and trades ==
This season would mark the second of five straight seasons where the effects of waiving Bradley Beal's original contract from the previous season (which was set to expire this season) would come into play, as well as the third straight season where the effects of waiving Nassir Little's mid-sized contract from 2024 (which will mark seven total seasons later on) and E. J. Liddell's smaller contract from 2024 would come into play. Entering free agency, the Suns will see Mark Williams enter restricted free agency alongside two-way contract signings Isaiah Livers and former rookie Koby Brea, while the likes of guards Collin Gillespie, Jordan Goodwin, and Amir Coffey would enter unrestricted free agency (once again for Phoenix in the case of Goodwin), with Jamaree Bouyea deciding to stay with the Suns (albeit with his contract still not being fully guaranteed just yet) on June 29, 2026 as well. Before free agency officially began, the Suns would have set agreements with Collin Gillespie, Jordan Goodwin, and Mark Williams on long-term deals. Not only that, but they would also have a trade with the Charlotte Hornets get agreed upon where they would trade guards Grayson Allen and Royce O'Neale alongside their (unprotected) 2033 first round pick to the Hornets in exchange for controversial forward Miles Bridges, a 2027 second-round pick from either the Boston Celtics or Orlando Magic, and a 2029 first-round pick from either the Cleveland Cavaliers, Minnesota Timberwolves or Utah Jazz (with the trade later being made official on July 13, 2026).

By the start of free agency on June 30, the Suns would have Luke Kennard, a shooting guard from the Los Angeles Lakers, agree to a two-year contract with Phoenix, which was made official on July 14. Following that, the Suns would have Pat Spencer, a former lacrosse college star turned shooting guard from the Golden State Warriors, sign a two-way contract with Phoenix on July 3 to have him go between the Phoenix Suns and Valley Suns affiliate team from the NBA G League whenever necessary. Not only that, but fellow two-way contract Koby Brea would sign his own two-way contract to return with the Suns on July 6, while all three of Collin Gillespie, Jordan Goodwin, and Mark Williams would officially sign their new deal to return with the team a day later on July 7. Meanwhile, Amir Coffey would sign a new deal with the Hapoel Tel Aviv B.C. in Israel on July 9. Currently, the only remaining free agent from the team, former two-way contract Isaiah Livers, has yet to find a new team of his own to join as of July 15, with the rest of the team's official roster size essentially being filled out already outside of their training camp/preseason period, although the Suns would waive Haywood Highsmith's partially guaranteed contract on August 12 before giving him a new contract to return to the team only three days later. Not only that, but following a shoulder injury to Mark Williams on September 11 that would leave him out for several months, the Suns would sign former Portland Trail Blazers center Duop Reath to a one-year veteran's minimum deal on September 16 to help out the center position a bit while Williams heals up for this season.

== Roster ==
Phoenix Suns roster
Players

Pos.	No.	Player	Height	Weight	DOB	From
G	15	Devin Booker	6 ft 5 in (1.96 m)	206 lb (93 kg)	1996-10-30	Kentucky
G	17	Jamaree Bouyea	6 ft 2 in (1.88 m)	180 lb (82 kg)	1999-06-27	San Francisco
F	22	Miles Bridges	6 ft 7 in (2.01 m)	225 lb (102 kg)	1998-03-21	Michigan State
G/F	3	Dillon Brooks	6 ft 7 in (2.01 m)	225 lb (102 kg)	1996-01-22	Oregon
F	0	Ryan Dunn	6 ft 7 in (2.01 m)	216 lb (98 kg)	2003-01-07	Virginia
F	20	Rasheer Fleming	6 ft 9 in (2.06 m)	240 lb (109 kg)	2004-07-10	Saint Joseph's
G	12	Collin Gillespie	6 ft 1 in (1.85 m)	195 lb (88 kg)	1999-06-25	Villanova
G	23	Jordan Goodwin	6 ft 3 in (1.91 m)	215 lb (98 kg)	1998-10-23	Saint Louis
G	4	Jalen Green	6 ft 4 in (1.93 m)	186 lb (84 kg)	2002-02-09	Prolific Prep (CA)
F	11	Oso Ighodaro	6 ft 11 in (2.11 m)	235 lb (107 kg)	2002-07-14	Marquette
G	8	Luke Kennard	6 ft 5 in (1.96 m)	206 lb (93 kg)	1996-06-24	Duke
C	10	Khaman Maluach	7 ft 1 in (2.16 m)	250 lb (113 kg)	2006-09-14	Duke
F	18	Koa Peat	6 ft 8 in (2.03 m)	235 lb (107 kg)	2007-01-20	Arizona
C	26	Duop Reath (TW)	6 ft 10 in (2.08 m)	245 lb (111 kg)	1996-06-26	LSU
G	61	Pat Spencer (TW)	6 ft 2 in (1.88 m)	205 lb (93 kg)	1996-07-04	Northwestern
F	2	Drew Timme (TW)	6 ft 9 in (2.06 m)	235 lb (107 kg)	2000-09-09	Gonzaga
C	25	Mark Williams (injured)	7 ft 1 in (2.16 m)	240 lb (109 kg)	2001-12-16	Duke

Coaches
Head coach
- Jordan Ott
Assistant(s)
- Chaisson Allen
- DeMarre Carroll
- Sean Dwyer
- John Little
- Jesse Mermuys
- Mike Muscala
- Brian Randle

Legend
- (DP) Unsigned draft pick
- (FA) Free agent
- (S) Suspended
- (GL) On assignment to G League affiliate
- (TW) Two-way affiliate player
- Injured

Roster
Updated: October 19, 2026

== Standings ==
=== Division ===
Pacific Division	W	L	PCT	GB	Home	Road	Div	GP
Los Angeles Lakers	14	3	.824	–	7‍–‍2	7‍–‍1	6–1	17
Phoenix Suns	8	7	.533	5.0	5‍–‍4	3‍–‍3	3–2	15
Golden State Warriors	8	8	.500	5.5	6‍–‍1	2‍–‍7	3–2	16
Los Angeles Clippers	4	10	.286	8.5	4‍–‍4	0‍–‍6	1–4	14
Sacramento Kings	1	14	.067	12.0	0‍–‍9	1‍–‍5	0–4	15

=== Conference ===
Western Conference
#	Team	W	L	PCT	GB	GP
1	Los Angeles Lakers *	14	3	.824	–	17
2	San Antonio Spurs *	13	3	.813	0.5	16
3	Memphis Grizzlies	12	4	.750	1.5	16
4	Houston Rockets	12	5	.706	2.0	17
5	Minnesota Timberwolves *	11	5	.688	2.5	16
6	Portland Trail Blazers	10	5	.667	3.0	15
7	Denver Nuggets	9	5	.643	3.5	14
8	Oklahoma City Thunder	10	6	.625	3.5	16
9	Phoenix Suns	8	7	.533	5.0	15
10	Dallas Mavericks	8	7	.533	5.0	15
11	Golden State Warriors	8	8	.500	5.5	16
12	New Orleans Pelicans	5	12	.294	9.0	17
13	Los Angeles Clippers	4	10	.286	8.5	14
14	Utah Jazz	3	14	.176	11.0	17
15	Sacramento Kings	1	14	.067	12.0	15

== Game log ==
=== Preseason ===
2026 preseason game log
Total: 1–4 (Home: 1–1; Road: 0–3)
Preseason: 1–4 (home: 1–1; road: 0–3)

Game	Date	Team	Score	High points	High rebounds	High assists	Location Attendance	Record
1	October 5	@ Detroit	L 107–109	Devin Booker (13)	Jordan Goodwin (6)	Miles Bridges (4)	Little Caesars Arena; 12,007	0–1
2	October 7	@ Chicago	L 117–124	Dillon Brooks (24)	Khaman Maluach (7)	Kennard, Maluach (4)	United Center; 16,362	0–2
3	October 10	San Antonio	W 102–98	Luke Kennard (20)	Khaman Maluach (15)	Green, Ighodaro (5)	Mortgage Matchup Center; 17,071	1–2
4	October 14	@ San Antonio	L 103–123	Bouyea, Dunn (15)	Tied (4)	Jamaree Bouyea (8)	Frost Bank Center; 18,354	1–3
5	October 16	Utah	L 116–119	Brooks, Green (18)	Khaman Maluach (12)	Devin Booker (6)	Mortgage Matchup Center; 17,071	1–4

2026–27 preseason schedule

=== Regular season ===
2026–27 game log
Total: 8–7 (Home: 5–4; Road: 3–3)
October: 1–3 (home: 1–1; road: 0–2)

Game	Date	Team	Score	High points	High rebounds	High assists	Location Attendance	Record
1	October 21	@ Portland	L 83–124	Devin Booker (23)	Khaman Maluach (6)	Green, Ighodaro (3)	Moda Center; 19,367	0–1
2	October 24	Golden State	W 131–122	Devin Booker (43)	Khaman Maluach (9)	Collin Gillespie (9)	Mortgage Matchup Center; 17,071	1–1
3	October 26	@ Oklahoma City	L 114–125	Jalen Green (20)	Miles Bridges (8)	Devin Booker (7)	Paycom Center; 18,203	1–2
4	October 30	Denver	L 120–127	Miles Bridges (24)	Miles Bridges (10)	Collin Gillespie (10)	Mortgage Matchup Center; 17,071	1–3

November: 7–4 (home: 4–3; road: 3–1)

Game	Date	Team	Score	High points	High rebounds	High assists	Location Attendance	Record
5	November 2	@ Golden State	L 113–116	Devin Booker (26)	Brooks, Green (8)	Jalen Green (8)	Chase Center; 18,064	1–4
6	November 4	Portland	L 119–132	Devin Booker (33)	Bridges, Ighodaro (7)	Oso Ighodaro (7)	Mortgage Matchup Center; 17,071	1–5
7	November 5	Orlando	W 117–104	Devin Booker (30)	Miles Bridges (13)	Devin Booker (8)	Mortgage Matchup Center; 17,071	2–5
8	November 7	Houston	W 102–99	Devin Booker (24)	Bridges, Maluach (10)	Miles Bridges (7)	Mortgage Matchup Center; 17,071	3–5
9	November 9	San Antonio	L 96–122	Devin Booker (32)	Tied (5)	Booker, Green (4)	Mortgage Matchup Center; 17,071	3–6
10	November 10	L.A. Clippers	W 133–110	Jordan Goodwin (18)	Ryan Dunn (8)	Collin Gillespie (8)	Mortgage Matchup Center; 17,071	4–6
11	November 12	Charlotte	W 101–96	Devin Booker (30)	Miles Bridges (6)	Booker, Ighodaro (7)	Mortgage Matchup Center; 17,071	5–6
12	November 15	L.A. Lakers	L 123–131	Collin Gillespie (26)	Jordan Goodwin (7)	Devin Booker (7)	Mortgage Matchup Center; 17,071	5–7
13	November 16	@ Denver	W 117–105	Devin Booker (20)	Oso Ighodaro (11)	Devin Booker (8)	Ball Arena; 19,520	6–7
14	November 18	@ Sacramento	W 128–107	Booker, Brooks (29)	Jalen Green (7)	Jalen Green (7)	Golden 1 Center; 13,016	7–7
15	November 20	@ Utah	W 111–101	Devin Booker (23)	Bridges, Goodwin (9)	Collin Gillespie (5)	Delta Center; 17,867	8–7
16	November 23	@ New Orleans					Smoothie King Center	–
17	November 25	@ Houston					Toyota Center	–
18	November 27	Dallas					Mortgage Matchup Center	–
19	November 29	@ Utah					Delta Center	–

December: 0–0 (home: 0–0; road: 0–0)

Game	Date	Team	Score	High points	High rebounds	High assists	Location Attendance	Record
20	December 1	L.A. Clippers					Mortgage Matchup Center	–
21	December 2	Sacramento					Mortgage Matchup Center	–
22	TBD	TBD					TBD	–
23	TBD	TBD					TBD	–
24	December 12	Minnesota					Mortgage Matchup Center	–
25	December 14	Atlanta					Mortgage Matchup Center	–
26	December 16	@ Detroit					Little Caesars Arena	–
27	December 18	@ Milwaukee					Fiserv Forum	–
28	December 20	@ Memphis					FedExForum	–
29	December 21	@ Minnesota					Target Center	–
30	December 23	Indiana					Mortgage Matchup Center	–
31	December 26	@ Dallas					American Airlines Center	–
32	December 28	Golden State					Mortgage Matchup Center	–
33	December 30	Philadelphia					Mortgage Matchup Center	–
34	December 31	New York					Mortgage Matchup Center	–

January: 0–0 (home: 0–0; road: 0–0)

Game	Date	Team	Score	High points	High rebounds	High assists	Location Attendance	Record
35	January 2	Sacramento					Mortgage Matchup Center	–
36	January 4	Boston					Mortgage Matchup Center	–
37	January 5	@ Denver					Ball Arena	–
38	January 8	@ Dallas					American Airlines Center	–
39	January 10	Chicago					Mortgage Matchup Center	–
40	January 13	@ Toronto					Scotiabank Arena	–
41	January 15	@ Indiana					Gainbridge Fieldhouse	–
42	January 18	@ L.A. Clippers					Intuit Dome	–
43	January 20	Memphis					Mortgage Matchup Center	–
44	January 22	Utah					Mortgage Matchup Center	–
45	January 24	Utah					Mortgage Matchup Center	–
46	January 26	@ New York					Madison Square Garden	–
47	January 27	@ Brooklyn					Barclays Center	–
48	January 29	@ Boston					TD Garden	–
49	January 31	@ Minnesota					Target Center	–

February: 0–0 (home: 0–0; road: 0–0)

Game	Date	Team	Score	High points	High rebounds	High assists	Location Attendance	Record
50	February 3	Cleveland					Mortgage Matchup Center	–
51	February 5	Houston					Mortgage Matchup Center	–
52	February 6	@ Sacramento					Golden 1 Center	–
53	February 8	L.A. Lakers					Mortgage Matchup Center	–
54	February 10	Detroit					Mortgage Matchup Center	–
55	February 12	@ Atlanta					State Farm Arena	–
56	February 14	@ Cleveland					Rocket Arena	–
57	February 15	@ Washington					Capital One Arena	–
58	February 17	@ Philadelphia					Xfinity Mobile Arena	–
All-Star Game
59	February 25	@ New Orleans					Smoothie King Center	–
60	February 27	New Orleans					Mortgage Matchup Center	–

March: 0–0 (home: 0–0; road: 0–0)

Game	Date	Team	Score	High points	High rebounds	High assists	Location Attendance	Record
61	March 1	Washington					Mortgage Matchup Center	–
62	March 3	Brooklyn					Mortgage Matchup Center	–
63	March 5	Minnesota					Mortgage Matchup Center	–
64	March 8	@ Miami					Kaseya Center	–
65	March 9	@ Orlando					Kia Center	–
66	March 11	@ Chicago					United Center	–
67	March 13	@ Charlotte					Spectrum Center	–
68	March 15	@ Memphis					FedExForum	–
69	March 17	@ L.A. Lakers					Crypto.com Arena	–
70	March 19	Miami					Mortgage Matchup Center	–
71	March 21	Portland					Mortgage Matchup Center	–
72	March 23	Oklahoma City					Mortgage Matchup Center	–
73	March 24	Oklahoma City					Mortgage Matchup Center	–
74	March 26	Milwaukee					Mortgage Matchup Center	–
75	March 28	Toronto					Mortgage Matchup Center	–
76	March 29	@ San Antonio					Frost Bank Center	–
77	March 31	@ San Antonio					Frost Bank Center	–

April: 0–0 (home: 0–0; road: 0–0)

Game	Date	Team	Score	High points	High rebounds	High assists	Location Attendance	Record
78	April 2	Denver					Mortgage Matchup Center	–
79	April 4	@ L.A. Clippers					Intuit Dome	–
80	April 6	@ Golden State					Chase Center	–
81	April 9	Memphis					Mortgage Matchup Center	–
82	April 11	@ L.A. Lakers					Crypto.com Arena	–

2026–27 season schedule

== NBA Cup ==
=== West Group A ===
Pos	Team	Pld	W	L	PF	PA	PD	Qualification
1	Dallas Mavericks	2	2	0	228	211	+17	Advance to knockout stage
2	Denver Nuggets	2	2	0	260	244	+16	Possible knockout stage based on ranking
3	Phoenix Suns	2	1	1	231	228	+3	
4	Houston Rockets	3	1	2	360	367	−7	
5	Utah Jazz	3	0	3	319	348	−29	

Updated to game(s) played on November 20, 2026. Source:

On July 1, 2026, the NBA announced the group listings for all 30 NBA teams in the league for the 2026 NBA Cup this season. For the Suns, they would not only return to Group A once again, but they would once again compete against the Utah Jazz, as well as compete against all three of the Dallas Mavericks, Denver Nuggets, and the Houston Rockets in this event this time around.

== Awards, honors, and records ==
- Entering this season, Devin Booker would become the third player in franchise history to stay with the Phoenix Suns for at least twelve years, joining the likes of Kevin Johnson and Alvan Adams as the only other Suns players to stay with the team for that same amount of time. Booker would look to make his regular season debut on October 21, 2026 against the Portland Trail Blazers this season.

== Transactions ==
=== Trades ===
Date	Trades		Ref.
June 24, 2026	Four-team trade		(Note: Because this trade was official before the second round began, picks were traded rather than any players' draft rights.)
June 24, 2026	To Phoenix Suns: Draft rights to Koa Peat (No. 30) (from Dallas)	To Dallas Mavericks: Draft rights to Sergio de Larrea (No. 25) (from Los Angeles)	(Note: Because this trade was official before the second round began, picks were traded rather than any players' draft rights.)
June 24, 2026	To Los Angeles Lakers: Draft rights to Cameron Carr (No. 24) (from New York)	To New York Knicks: Draft rights to Melvin Ajinça (2024 No. 51) (from Dallas); Draft rights to Chinemelu Elonu (2009 No. 59) (from Los Angeles); Draft rights to Louis Labeyrie (2014 No. 57) (from Los Angeles); 2026 PHI second-round pick (No. 47 Draft rights to Tyler Nickel) (from Phoenix); 2029 PHX second-round pick (from Phoenix); 2030 PHI second-round pick (from Dallas); 2032 DAL second-round pick (from Dallas); 2033 PHX second-round pick (from Phoenix); Cash considerations (from Los Angeles); Cash considerations (from Phoenix)	(Note: Because this trade was official before the second round began, picks were traded rather than any players' draft rights.)
July 13, 2026	To Phoenix Suns: Miles Bridges; 2027 second-round pick (Note: The less favorable of the picks originally belonging to Boston and Orlando.); 2029 protected first-round pick (Note: The least favorable of the picks originally belonging to Cleveland, Minnesota, and Utah. The Minnesota pick is only conveyable if No. 6–30; whether this protection also applies to the Cleveland and Utah picks is ambiguous.)	To Charlotte Hornets: Grayson Allen; Royce O'Neale; 2033 PHX first-round pick	

=== Free agency ===
==== Re-signed ====
Date	Player	Ref.
July 6, 2026	Koby Brea	
July 7, 2026	Collin Gillespie	
July 7, 2026	Jordan Goodwin	
July 7, 2026	Mark Williams	
August 15, 2026	Haywood Highsmith	

==== Additions ====
Date	Player	Former Team	Reason	Ref.
July 3, 2026	Pat Spencer	Golden State Warriors	Two-way contract	
July 13, 2026	Miles Bridges	Charlotte Hornets	Trade	
July 14, 2026	Luke Kennard	Los Angeles Lakers	Unrestricted free agent	
September 16, 2026	Duop Reath	Portland Trail Blazers	Unrestricted free agent	

==== Subtractions ====
Player	Reason	New Team(s)	Ref.
Grayson Allen	Traded	Charlotte Hornets	
Royce O'Neale	Traded	Charlotte Hornets	
Amir Coffey	Unrestricted free agent	(Israel) Hapoel Tel Aviv B.C.	
Isaiah Livers	Restricted free agent (Two-way contract expired)	(Japan) Yokohama B-Corsairs	
Haywood Highsmith	Waived	Phoenix Suns	
