= 2026–27 Chicago Bulls season =

- Head coach: Tiago Splitter
- President: Bryson Graham
- General manager: Stephen Mervis
- Owner: Jerry Reinsdorf
- Arena: United Center

Results
- Record: 4–11 (.267)
- Place: Division: 4th (Central); Conference: 13th (Eastern)
- Stats at Basketball Reference

Local media
- Television: Chicago Sports Network
- Radio: WLS; WSCR

The 2026–27 Chicago Bulls season is the 61st season for the franchise in the National Basketball Association (NBA). On April 21, 2026, Billy Donovan stepped down as the Chicago Bulls' head coach. In May 2026, the team hired Stephen Mervis as its new senior vice-president of basketball operations, Acie Law IV as its new vice-president of player personnel, and Bryson Graham as its new executive vice-president of basketball operations. On June 16, 2026, the Bulls hired Tiago Splitter as their new head coach. The Bulls entered the season with the fourth overall pick that would be used to draft Caleb Wilson.

This will mark the first season since 2005–06 without Stacey King in the broadcast booth for locally televised games, as he passed away on June 7, 2026, at the age of 59. The Bulls are expected to honor King throughout the season.

On October 21, the Bulls suffered their worst season-opening loss in franchise history, losing to the Toronto Raptors by 43 points. After winning the following game, the Bulls suffered an eight-game losing streak, during which rookie Caleb Wilson fractured his right hand.

== Draft picks ==
Round	Pick	Player	Position	Nationality	College
1	4	Caleb Wilson	SF	United States	North Carolina
1	15	Dailyn Swain	SG/SF	United States	Texas
2	38	Braden Smith	PG	United States	Purdue
2	56	Vsevolod Ishchenko	G	Russia	PBC Lokomotiv Kuban (Russia)

The Bulls entered the draft holding two first-round selections and two second-round selections.

In the NBA draft lottery, the Bulls' original first-round pick moved up to the top 4. The Bulls' remaining selections were acquired via previous trades: a first-round pick from the Portland Trail Blazers that conveyed to Chicago when Portland made the 2026 NBA playoffs, having previously deferred as a lottery-protected pick since the 2021 Lauri Markkanen three-team trade, and two second-round picks acquired during the 2026 trade deadline, conveyed after being passed on multiple times from their original owners, the New Orleans Pelicans and Denver Nuggets, respectively. Both second-round picks were finalized after the 2025–26 season when New Orleans finished with a worse record than Portland and two other teams to yield the most favorable pick, while Denver finished with a better record than the Golden State Warriors to yield the less favorable pick. The Bulls had also traded their original second-round pick to the Washington Wizards in 2024 and the pick was held by the Houston Rockets in the draft.

On the second day of the draft, the Bulls traded away both second-round picks that they were holding to the Indiana Pacers and Dallas Mavericks, respectively.

== Roster ==
Chicago Bulls roster
Players

Pos.	No.	Player	Height	Weight	DOB	From
F	19	Tobe Awaka (TW)	6 ft 8 in (2.03 m)	250 lb (113 kg)	2004-01-30	Arizona
F	14	Matas Buzelis	6 ft 9 in (2.06 m)	196 lb (89 kg)	2004-10-13	Sunrise Christian (KS)
C	9	Nic Claxton	6 ft 11 in (2.11 m)	215 lb (98 kg)	1999-04-17	Georgia
F/C	12	Zach Collins	6 ft 9 in (2.06 m)	240 lb (109 kg)	1997-11-19	Gonzaga
F	2	Noa Essengue	6 ft 9 in (2.06 m)	194 lb (88 kg)	2006-12-18	France
G	3	Josh Giddey	6 ft 8 in (2.03 m)	214 lb (97 kg)	2002-10-10	Australia
G	15	Jordan Hawkins (TW)	6 ft 4 in (1.93 m)	190 lb (86 kg)	2002-04-29	Connecticut
G	7	Buddy Hield	6 ft 5 in (1.96 m)	220 lb (100 kg)	1992-12-17	Oklahoma
G	30	Tre Jones	6 ft 1 in (1.85 m)	190 lb (86 kg)	2000-01-08	Duke
F	11	Leonard Miller	6 ft 10 in (2.08 m)	220 lb (100 kg)	2003-11-26	Fort Erie (CAN)
G/F	35	Isaac Okoro	6 ft 6 in (1.98 m)	225 lb (102 kg)	2001-01-26	Auburn
G	24	Norman Powell	6 ft 4 in (1.93 m)	215 lb (98 kg)	1993-05-25	UCLA
C	00	Orlando Robinson (GL)	6 ft 10 in (2.08 m)	235 lb (107 kg)	2000-07-10	Fresno State
G	22	Jaylin Sellers (TW)	6 ft 4 in (1.93 m)	205 lb (93 kg)	2003-06-03	Providence
F/C	25	Jalen Smith	6 ft 9 in (2.06 m)	244 lb (111 kg)	2000-03-16	Maryland
F	5	Dailyn Swain	6 ft 6 in (1.98 m)	220 lb (100 kg)	2005-07-15	Texas
F	44	Patrick Williams	6 ft 7 in (2.01 m)	235 lb (107 kg)	2001-08-26	Florida State
F	8	Caleb Wilson (injured)	6 ft 10 in (2.08 m)	215 lb (98 kg)	2006-07-18	North Carolina

Coaches
Head coach
- Tiago Splitter
Assistant(s)
- Blake Ahearn
- Taj Gibson
- Jonah Herscu
- Rex Kalamian
- Jamelle McMillan
- Wes Unseld Jr.

Legend
- (DP) Unsigned draft pick
- (FA) Free agent
- (S) Suspended
- (GL) On assignment to G League affiliate
- (TW) Two-way affiliate player
- Injured

Roster
Updated: November 13, 2026

== Standings ==
=== Division ===
Central Division	W	L	PCT	GB	Home	Road	Div	GP
Detroit Pistons	10	4	.714	–	3‍–‍2	7‍–‍2	0–0	14
Cleveland Cavaliers	8	8	.500	3.0	6‍–‍3	2‍–‍5	2–0	16
Indiana Pacers	5	10	.333	5.5	2‍–‍6	3‍–‍4	0–1	15
Chicago Bulls	4	10	.286	6.0	1‍–‍4	3‍–‍6	1–1	14
Milwaukee Bucks	1	15	.063	10.0	1‍–‍8	0‍–‍7	1–2	16

=== Conference ===
Eastern Conference
#	Team	W	L	PCT	GB	GP
1	Philadelphia 76ers *	13	3	.813	–	16
2	Boston Celtics	11	4	.733	1.5	15
3	Detroit Pistons *	10	4	.714	2.0	14
4	Miami Heat *	9	6	.600	3.5	15
5	Atlanta Hawks	9	6	.600	3.5	15
6	New York Knicks	9	6	.600	3.5	15
7	Cleveland Cavaliers	8	8	.500	5.0	16
8	Orlando Magic	6	8	.429	6.0	14
9	Toronto Raptors	5	10	.333	7.5	15
10	Indiana Pacers	5	10	.333	7.5	15
11	Washington Wizards	5	11	.313	8.0	16
12	Charlotte Hornets	4	10	.286	8.0	14
13	Chicago Bulls	4	10	.286	8.0	14
14	Brooklyn Nets	3	11	.214	9.0	14
15	Milwaukee Bucks	1	15	.063	12.0	16

== Game log ==
=== Preseason ===
2026 preseason game log
Total: 3–2 (Home: 2–1; Road: 1–1)
Preseason: 3–2 (home: 2–1; road: 1–1)

Game	Date	Team	Score	High points	High rebounds	High assists	Location Attendance	Record
1	October 7	Phoenix	W 124–117	Caleb Wilson (15)	Tobe Awaka (11)	Josh Giddey (7)	United Center; 16,362	1–0
2	October 9	Memphis	L 100–104	Caleb Wilson (21)	Leonard Miller (11)	Dailyn Swain (4)	United Center; 18,966	1–1
3	October 11	@ Denver	L 128–133	Leonard Miller (26)	Leonard Miller (7)	Josh Giddey (8)	Ball Arena	1–2
4	October 14	@ Milwaukee	W 125–104	Matas Buzelis (19)	Miller, Smith (7)	Josh Giddey (9)	Fiserv Forum; 10,146	2–2
5	October 16	Minnesota	W 133–116	Caleb Wilson (16)	Caleb Wilson (7)	Tre Jones (5)	United Center; 21,017	3–2

2026–27 preseason schedule

=== Regular season ===
2026–27 game log
Total: 4–11 (Home: 1–5; Road: 3–6)
October: 1–5 (home: 0–2; road: 1–3)

Game	Date	Team	Score	High points	High rebounds	High assists	Location Attendance	Record
1	October 21	@ Toronto	L 92–135	Matas Buzelis (17)	Jalen Smith (8)	Josh Giddey (6)	Scotiabank Arena; 19,800	0–1
2	October 23	@ Milwaukee	W 132–125	Norman Powell (25)	Jalen Smith (11)	Josh Giddey (9)	Fiserv Forum; 16,354	1–1
3	October 24	Washington	L 120–124	Caleb Wilson (30)	Caleb Wilson (14)	Josh Giddey (10)	United Center; 21,496	1–2
4	October 26	@ Boston	L 99–134	Norman Powell (20)	Leonard Miller (9)	Giddey, Okoro (4)	TD Garden; 19,156	1–3
5	October 28	New York	L 127–133	Norman Powell (30)	Jalen Smith (11)	Josh Giddey (11)	United Center; 20,596	1–4
6	October 30	@ Boston	L 111–125	Caleb Wilson (23)	Jalen Smith (12)	Josh Giddey (5)	TD Garden; 19,156	1–5

November: 3–6 (home: 1–3; road: 2–3)

Game	Date	Team	Score	High points	High rebounds	High assists	Location Attendance	Record
7	November 2	@ Philadelphia	L 107–126	Caleb Wilson (24)	Smith, Wilson (7)	Josh Giddey (10)	Xfinity Mobile Arena; 21,309	1–6
8	November 4	@ New York	L 105–135	Jones, Sellers (14)	Leonard Miller (6)	Josh Giddey (6)	Madison Square Garden; 19,812	1–7
9	November 8	Philadelphia	L 121–127	Buzelis, Giddey (19)	Jalen Smith (8)	Josh Giddey (15)	United Center; 21,060	1–8
10	November 11	San Antonio	L 119–124	Jalen Smith (23)	Patrick Williams (7)	Josh Giddey (7)	United Center; 19,699	1–9
11	November 13	Atlanta	W 125–117 (OT)	Norman Powell (33)	Jalen Smith (12)	Josh Giddey (14)	United Center; 19,466	2–9
12	November 14	@ Minnesota	W 117–106	Norman Powell (24)	Matas Buzelis (9)	Josh Giddey (5)	Target Center; 18,054	3–9
13	November 16	@ Cleveland	L 115–126	Norman Powell (27)	Jalen Smith (11)	Josh Giddey (8)	Rocket Arena; 19,432	3–10
14	November 18	@ Brooklyn	W 137–107	Matas Buzelis (25)	Josh Giddey (14)	Josh Giddey (9)	Barclays Center; 17,548	4–10
15	November 20	Washington	L 94–98	Norman Powell (16)	Claxton, Okoro (7)	Giddey, Jones (7)	United Center	4–11
16	November 22	Denver					United Center	–
17	November 23	Cleveland					United Center	–
18	November 25	@ Charlotte					Spectrum Center	–
19	November 28	Indiana					United Center	–

December: 0–0 (home: 0–0; road: 0–0)

Game	Date	Team	Score	High points	High rebounds	High assists	Location Attendance	Record
20	December 1	New York					United Center	–
21	December 3	Cleveland					United Center	–
22	December	TBD					TBD	–
23	December	TBD					TBD	–
24	December 13	Houston					United Center	–
25	December 14	Miami					United Center	–
26	December 16	Utah					United Center	–
27	December 18	@ San Antonio					Frost Bank Center	–
28	December 19	@ Dallas					American Airlines Center	–
29	December 21	@ Miami					Kaseya Center	–
30	December 23	@ Miami					Kaseya Center	–
31	December 26	Detroit					United Center	–
32	December 29	@ Atlanta					State Farm Arena	–
33	December 30	Boston					United Center	–

January: 0–0 (home: 0–0; road: 0–0)

Game	Date	Team	Score	High points	High rebounds	High assists	Location Attendance	Record
34	January 2	L.A. Lakers					United Center	–
35	January 4	@ Indiana					Gainbridge Fieldhouse	–
36	January 5	Milwaukee					United Center	–
37	January 7	@ Sacramento					Golden 1 Center	–
38	January 9	@ Golden State					Chase Center	–
39	January 10	@ Phoenix					Mortgage Matchup Center	–
40	January 12	@ Utah					Delta Center	–
41	January 14	Minnesota					United Center	–
42	January 17	Toronto					United Center	–
43	January 19	@ Toronto					Scotiabank Arena	–
44	January 20	@ Brooklyn					Barclays Center	–
45	January 23	Philadelphia					United Center	–
46	January 25	Dallas					United Center	–
47	January 26	@ Indiana					Gainbridge Fieldhouse	–
48	January 28	@ Orlando					Kia Center	–
49	January 31	@ Oklahoma City					Paycom Center	–

February: 0–0 (home: 0–0; road: 0–0)

Game	Date	Team	Score	High points	High rebounds	High assists	Location Attendance	Record
50	February 2	@ Detroit					Little Caesars Arena	–
51	February 4	Oklahoma City					United Center	–
52	February 6	New Orleans					United Center	–
53	February 8	@ Washington					Capital One Arena	–
54	February 9	Golden State					United Center	–
55	February 11	@ Denver					Ball Arena	–
56	February 14	@ Portland					Moda Center	–
57	February 16	@ L.A. Lakers					Crypto.com Arena	–
58	February 17	@ L.A. Clippers					Intuit Dome	–
All-Star Game
59	February 25	Atlanta					United Center	–
60	February 27	Brooklyn					United Center	–

March: 0–0 (home: 0–0; road: 0–0)

Game	Date	Team	Score	High points	High rebounds	High assists	Location Attendance	Record
61	March 1	@ Detroit					Little Caesars Arena	–
62	March 3	@ Atlanta					State Farm Arena	–
63	March 6	Charlotte					United Center	–
64	March 7	Portland					United Center	–
65	March 9	Boston					United Center	–
66	March 11	Phoenix					United Center	–
67	March 13	Memphis					United Center	–
68	March 15	Orlando					United Center	–
69	March 17	@ Philadelphia					Xfinity Mobile Arena	–
70	March 20	@ Cleveland					Rocket Arena	–
71	March 22	Sacramento					United Center	–
72	March 24	Orlando					United Center	–
73	March 25	@ Memphis					FedEx Forum	–
74	March 27	L.A. Clippers					United Center	–
75	March 29	Indiana					United Center	–
76	March 31	@ Washington					Capital One Arena	–

April: 0–0 (home: 0–0; road: 0–0)

Game	Date	Team	Score	High points	High rebounds	High assists	Location Attendance	Record
77	April 2	Detroit					United Center	–
78	April 4	@ Houston					Toyota Center	–
79	April 6	@ Milwaukee					Fiserv Forum	–
80	April 7	Charlotte					United Center	–
81	April 9	Milwaukee					United Center	–
82	April 11	@ New Orleans					Smoothie King Center	–

2026–27 season schedule

== NBA Cup ==
=== East Group C ===
Pos	Team	Pld	W	L	PF	PA	PD	Qualification
1	Boston Celtics	2	2	0	244	191	+53	Advance to knockout stage
2	Atlanta Hawks	3	2	1	360	339	+21	Possible knockout stage based on ranking
3	Washington Wizards	3	2	1	325	312	+13	
4	Chicago Bulls	3	1	2	315	333	−18	
5	Charlotte Hornets	3	0	3	256	325	−69	

Updated to game(s) played on November 20, 2026. Source:

== Transactions ==
=== Trades ===
Date	Trade		Ref.
June 24, 2026	To Chicago Bulls: Kam Jones; 2028 second-round pick swap right (Note: Chicago may trade its own pick for either one of the picks originally belonging to Indiana and Phoenix.); 2030 second-round pick swap right (Note: Chicago may trade its own pick for Indiana's own pick.); Cash considerations	To Indiana Pacers: Draft rights to Braden Smith (No. 38)	
June 24, 2026	To Chicago Bulls: Cash considerations	To Los Angeles Lakers: Draft rights to Vsevolod Ishchenko (No. 56)	
July 10, 2026	Four-team trade		
July 10, 2026	To Brooklyn Nets: Julius Randle (from Minnesota); Draft rights to Joshua Jefferson (No. 28) (from Minnesota)	To Charlotte Hornets: Mouhamadou Gueye (from Chicago); Naz Reid (from Minnesota); Draft rights to Matteo Spagnolo (2022 No. 50) (from Minnesota); 2028 first-round pick swap right (Note: Charlotte may swap its own pick for Minnesota's own pick.) (from Minnesota); 2029 first-round pick swap right (Note: Charlotte may swap its own pick for Minnesota's pick if it falls No. 1–5.) (from Minnesota); 2029 MIN second-round pick (from Minnesota); 2030 first-round pick swap right (Note: Through earlier trades, Minnesota will retain its own pick or receive the pick originally belonging to Dallas and San Antonio, if Minnesota's pick falls No. 2–30; Charlotte may swap its own pick for whichever pick Minnesota has afterward.) (from Minnesota); 2032 MIN second-round pick (from Minnesota); 2033 MIN first-round pick (from Minnesota); 2033 MIN second-round pick (from Minnesota)	
July 10, 2026	To Chicago Bulls: Nic Claxton (from Brooklyn)	To Minnesota Timberwolves: LaMelo Ball (from Charlotte); Josh Green (from Charlotte); Draft rights to Isaiah Evans (No. 33) (from Brooklyn)	
September 27, 2026	To Chicago Bulls: Buddy Hield; Cash considerations	To Charlotte Hornets: Rob Dillingham	

=== Free agency ===
==== Re-signed ====
Date	Player	Ref.

==== Additions ====
Date	Player	Former Team	Ref.
July 2, 2026	Tobe Awaka	Arizona Wildcats (undrafted)	
July 2, 2026	Jaylin Sellers	Providence Friars (undrafted)	
July 10, 2026	Norman Powell	Miami Heat	

==== Subtractions ====
Player	Reason	New Team	Ref.
Collin Sexton	Free agency	Los Angeles Lakers	
Anfernee Simons	Free agency	Philadelphia 76ers	
Guerschon Yabusele	Free agency	Panathinaikos B.C. (Greece)	
