= 2026–27 Milwaukee Bucks season =

- Head coach: Taylor Jenkins
- President: Peter Feigin
- General manager: Jon Horst
- Owners: Wesley Edens; Jimmy Haslam
- Arena: Fiserv Forum

Results
- Record: 1–16 (.059)
- Place: Division: 5th (Central); Conference: 15th (Eastern)
- Stats at Basketball Reference

Local media
- Television: WVTV-DT2
- Radio: WTMJ

The 2026–27 Milwaukee Bucks season is the 59th season for the franchise in the National Basketball Association (NBA). This is the first season since the 2012–13 season that All-Star Giannis Antetokounmpo is not on the opening day roster, as he was traded to the Miami Heat on July 6, 2026.

The Bucks opened the regular season with only one win in the first month for their worst start in franchise history, which includes an ongoing 13-game losing streak, the second-longest in franchise history after March to April 1996.

== Offseason ==
On April 13, 2026, Doc Rivers resigned from his position as head coach of the Bucks. On April 30, 2026, the Bucks hired Taylor Jenkins as their new head coach.

=== Draft picks ===
Round	Pick	Player	Position	Nationality	College
1	10	Brayden Burries	PG/SG	United States	Arizona

The Bucks entered the draft holding one first-round selection. They have traded their second-round selection to the Orlando Magic in 2020 before it was eventually used by the Boston Celtics because this pick was more favorable than those of Orlando and the Detroit Pistons, both of whom finished the 2025–26 season with better records than Milwaukee.

== Roster ==
Milwaukee Bucks roster
Players

Pos.	No.	Player	Height	Weight	DOB	From
F	15	Nate Ament	6 ft 10 in (2.08 m)	207 lb (94 kg)	2006-12-10	Tennessee
G	0	Brayden Burries	6 ft 4 in (1.93 m)	205 lb (93 kg)	2005-09-18	Arizona
F	21	Ousmane Dieng (injured)	6 ft 9 in (2.06 m)	185 lb (84 kg)	2003-05-21	France
G	20	A. J. Green	6 ft 4 in (1.93 m)	190 lb (86 kg)	1999-09-27	Northern Iowa
G	11	Tyler Herro	6 ft 5 in (1.96 m)	195 lb (88 kg)	2000-01-20	Kentucky
G	25	Kasparas Jakučionis	6 ft 5 in (1.96 m)	200 lb (91 kg)	2006-05-29	Illinois
G	24	Jaime Jaquez Jr.	6 ft 7 in (2.01 m)	225 lb (102 kg)	2001-02-18	UCLA
G	19	Kam Jones (TW)	6 ft 4 in (1.93 m)	200 lb (91 kg)	2002-02-25	Marquette
F	18	Kyle Kuzma	6 ft 8 in (2.03 m)	221 lb (100 kg)	1995-07-24	Utah
G	12	Caris LeVert	6 ft 7 in (2.01 m)	205 lb (93 kg)	1994-08-25	Michigan
F	23	Bogoljub Marković	6 ft 10 in (2.08 m)	210 lb (95 kg)	2005-07-12	Serbia
F	35	Pete Nance (TW)	6 ft 9 in (2.06 m)	225 lb (102 kg)	2000-02-19	North Carolina
G	13	Ryan Rollins	6 ft 3 in (1.91 m)	180 lb (82 kg)	2002-07-03	Toledo
G	30	Cormac Ryan (TW)	6 ft 5 in (1.96 m)	205 lb (93 kg)	1998-10-26	North Carolina
C	00	Jericho Sims	6 ft 10 in (2.08 m)	250 lb (113 kg)	1998-10-20	Texas
G	5	Gary Trent Jr.	6 ft 4 in (1.93 m)	204 lb (93 kg)	1999-01-18	Duke
F/C	3	Myles Turner	6 ft 11 in (2.11 m)	250 lb (113 kg)	1996-03-24	Texas
C	9	Kel'el Ware	7 ft 0 in (2.13 m)	230 lb (104 kg)	2004-04-20	Indiana

Coaches
Head coach
- Taylor Jenkins
Assistant(s)
- Johnny Carpenter
- Darvin Ham
- Jack Herum
- T. J. Ford
- Brad Jones
- Vince Legarza
- Patrick St. Andrews
- Isaiah Wilkins

Legend
- (DP) Unsigned draft pick
- (FA) Free agent
- (S) Suspended
- (GL) On assignment to G League affiliate
- (TW) Two-way affiliate player
- Injured

Roster
Updated: October 19, 2026

== Standings ==
=== Division ===
Central Division	W	L	PCT	GB	Home	Road	Div	GP
Detroit Pistons	10	5	.667	–	3‍–‍3	7‍–‍2	0–0	15
Cleveland Cavaliers	9	8	.529	2.0	7‍–‍3	2‍–‍5	3–0	17
Indiana Pacers	5	11	.313	5.5	2‍–‍6	3‍–‍5	0–2	16
Chicago Bulls	4	11	.267	6.0	1‍–‍5	3‍–‍6	1–1	15
Milwaukee Bucks	1	15	.063	9.5	1‍–‍8	0‍–‍7	1–2	16

=== Conference ===
Eastern Conference
#	Team	W	L	PCT	GB	GP
1	Philadelphia 76ers *	13	3	.813	–	16
2	Boston Celtics	11	4	.733	1.5	15
3	Detroit Pistons *	10	5	.667	2.5	15
4	Atlanta Hawks *	10	6	.625	3.0	16
5	Miami Heat	9	6	.600	3.5	15
6	New York Knicks	9	6	.600	3.5	15
7	Cleveland Cavaliers	9	8	.529	4.5	17
8	Orlando Magic	7	8	.467	5.5	15
9	Toronto Raptors	6	10	.375	7.0	16
10	Washington Wizards	6	11	.353	7.5	17
11	Indiana Pacers	5	11	.313	8.0	16
12	Charlotte Hornets	4	11	.267	8.5	15
13	Chicago Bulls	4	11	.267	8.5	15
14	Brooklyn Nets	3	12	.200	9.5	15
15	Milwaukee Bucks	1	15	.063	12.0	16

== Game log ==
=== Preseason ===
2026 preseason game log
Total: 2–3 (Home: 0–2; Road: 2–1)
Preseason: 2–3 (home: 0–2; road: 2–1)

Game	Date	Team	Score	High points	High rebounds	High assists	Location Attendance	Record
1	October 5	Minnesota	L 97–116	Ryan Rollins (15)	Kel'el Ware (12)	Brayden Burries (5)	Fiserv Forum; 9,147	0–1
2	October 7	@ Oklahoma City	W 128–126	Myles Turner (19)	Kel'el Ware (12)	Dieng, Rollins (7)	Paycom Center	1–1
3	October 11	@ Charlotte	L 90–105	Tyler Herro (18)	Herro, Jaquez Jr. (7)	Tied (4)	Spectrum Center; 10,931	1–2
4	October 14	Chicago	L 104–125	Kam Jones (23)	Ousmane Dieng (11)	Kasparas Jakučionis (6)	Fiserv Forum; 10,146	1–3
5	October 16	@ Indiana	W 128–127 (OT)	Tyler Herro (25)	Myles Turner (13)	Kasparas Jakučionis (6)	Gainbridge Fieldhouse; 10,283	2–3

2026–27 preseason schedule

=== Regular season ===
2026–27 game log
Total: 1–16 (Home: 1–8; Road: 0–8)
October: 1–5 (home: 1–3; road: 0–2)

Game	Date	Team	Score	High points	High rebounds	High assists	Location Attendance	Record
1	October 21	@ Washington	L 116–128	Tyler Herro (24)	Jaime Jaquez Jr. (7)	Tyler Herro (9)	Capital One Arena; 18,805	0–1
2	October 23	Chicago	L 125–132	Tyler Herro (34)	Jaime Jaquez Jr. (10)	Ryan Rollins (6)	Fiserv Forum; 16,354	0–2
3	October 24	@ Philadelphia	L 116–127	Jaime Jaquez Jr. (21)	Kel'el Ware (13)	Jaime Jaquez Jr. (4)	Xfinity Mobile Arena; 21,003	0–3
4	October 26	Indiana	W 110–102	Tyler Herro (23)	Kel'el Ware (14)	Tyler Herro (7)	Fiserv Forum; 10,674	1–3
5	October 28	Houston	L 100–132	Tyler Herro (23)	Kel'el Ware (8)	Kasparas Jakučionis (6)	Fiserv Forum; 12,232	1–4
6	October 31	Cleveland	L 111–136	Kel'el Ware (19)	Kel'el Ware (10)	Ryan Rollins (7)	Fiserv Forum; 12,572	1–5

November: 0–11 (home: 0–5; road: 0–6)

Game	Date	Team	Score	High points	High rebounds	High assists	Location Attendance	Record
7	November 2	@ Minnesota	L 100–112	Tyler Herro (19)	Burries, Ware (9)	Kasparas Jakučionis (6)	Target Center; 16,893	1–6
8	November 4	@ Boston	L 102–109	Tyler Herro (25)	Rollins, Turner (9)	Myles Turner (6)	TD Garden; 19,156	1–7
9	November 6	Toronto	L 107–121	Tyler Herro (23)	Brayden Burries (11)	Tyler Herro (10)	Fiserv Forum; 14,057	1–8
10	November 8	Boston	L 97–117	Kyle Kuzma (27)	Brayden Burries (8)	Myles Turner (7)	Fiserv Forum; 13,402	1–9
11	November 10	@ New York	L 85–117	Jaime Jaquez Jr. (16)	Tied (5)	Kasparas Jakučionis (4)	Madison Square Garden; 19,812	1–10
12	November 11	L.A. Lakers	L 112–123	Tyler Herro (27)	Ryan Rollins (7)	Tyler Herro (7)	Fiserv Forum; 15,356	1–11
13	November 13	@ Orlando	L 99–107	Jaime Jaquez Jr. (22)	Myles Turner (11)	Jaime Jaquez Jr. (4)	Kia Center; 19,140	1–12
14	November 15	Atlanta	L 106–113	Kasparas Jakučionis (25)	Kel'el Ware (11)	Kasparas Jakučionis (5)	Fiserv Forum; 11,474	1–13
15	November 18	@ Miami	L 130–137	Kyle Kuzma (26)	Brayden Burries (7)	Jaime Jaquez Jr. (5)	Kaseya Center; 20,272	1–14
16	November 19	Portland	L 114–124	Tyler Herro (19)	Nate Ament (9)	Ryan Rollins (6)	Fiserv Forum; 13,545	1–15
17	November 21	@ Philadelphia	L 129–132	Tyler Herro (50)	Tyler Herro (11)	Tyler Herro (7)	Xfinity Mobile Arena; 21,043	1–16
18	November 23	@ Toronto					Scotiabank Arena	–
19	November 25	Brooklyn					Fiserv Forum	–
20	November 27	@ Detroit					Little Caesars Arena	–
21	November 28	Oklahoma City					Fiserv Forum	–
22	November 30	San Antonio					Fiserv Forum	–

December: 0–0 (home: 0–0; road: 0–0)

Game	Date	Team	Score	High points	High rebounds	High assists	Location Attendance	Record
23	December 2	New York					Fiserv Forum	–
24	December	TBD					TBD	–
25	December	TBD					TBD	–
26	December 12	@ Memphis					FedEx Forum	–
27	December 14	@ Dallas					American Airlines Center	–
28	December 16	@ Houston					Toyota Center	–
29	December 18	Phoenix					Fiserv Forum	–
30	December 20	Golden State					Fiserv Forum	–
31	December 21	@ San Antonio					Frost Bank Center	–
32	December 23	Minnesota					Fiserv Forum	–
33	December 27	@ Orlando					Kia Center	–
34	December 29	@ Oklahoma City					Paycom Center	–
35	December 31	@ Atlanta					State Farm Arena	–

January: 0–0 (home: 0–0; road: 0–0)

Game	Date	Team	Score	High points	High rebounds	High assists	Location Attendance	Record
36	January 1	Philadelphia					Fiserv Forum	–
37	January 3	Charlotte					Fiserv Forum	–
38	January 5	@ Chicago					United Center	–
39	January 7	L.A. Clippers					Fiserv Forum	–
40	January 9	@ Indiana					Gainbridge Fieldhouse	–
41	January 12	Denver					Fiserv Forum	–
42	January 13	@ Indiana					Gainbridge Fieldhouse	–
43	January 15	Cleveland					Fiserv Forum	–
44	January 17	@ L.A. Lakers					Crypto.com Arena	–
45	January 20	@ Sacramento					Golden 1 Center	–
46	January 22	@ Golden State					Chase Center	–
47	January 23	@ Denver					Ball Arena	–
48	January 26	@ Utah					Delta Center	–
49	January 28	Miami					Fiserv Forum	–
50	January 30	Atlanta					Fiserv Forum	–

February: 0–0 (home: 0–0; road: 0–0)

Game	Date	Team	Score	High points	High rebounds	High assists	Location Attendance	Record
51	February 1	Memphis					Fiserv Forum	–
52	February 4	@ Miami					Kaseya Center	–
53	February 6	@ Toronto					Scotiabank Arena	–
54	February 8	Orlando					Fiserv Forum	–
55	February 9	Sacramento					Fiserv Forum	–
56	February 11	@ Charlotte					Spectrum Center	–
57	February 13	@ Washington					Capital One Arena	–
58	February 16	@ Cleveland					Rocket Arena	–
59	February 17	@ Cleveland					Rocket Arena	–
All-Star Game
60	February 25	Washington					Fiserv Forum	–
61	February 28	@ New York					Madison Square Garden	–

March: 0–0 (home: 0–0; road: 0–0)

Game	Date	Team	Score	High points	High rebounds	High assists	Location Attendance	Record
62	March 2	Detroit					Fiserv Forum	–
63	March 3	Utah					Fiserv Forum	–
64	March 5	@ New Orleans					Smoothie King Center	–
65	March 9	@ Brooklyn					Barclays Center	–
66	March 11	@ Detroit					Little Caesars Arena	–
67	March 12	Miami					Fiserv Forum	–
68	March 16	Orlando					Fiserv Forum	–
69	March 18	Detroit					Fiserv Forum	–
70	March 20	Indiana					Fiserv Forum	–
71	March 22	Washington					Fiserv Forum	–
72	March 24	@ L.A. Clippers					Intuit Dome	–
73	March 26	@ Phoenix					Mortgage Matchup Center	–
74	March 27	@ Portland					Moda Center	–
75	March 29	Dallas					Fiserv Forum	–
76	March 31	New Orleans					Fiserv Forum	–

April: 0–0 (home: 0–0; road: 0–0)

Game	Date	Team	Score	High points	High rebounds	High assists	Location Attendance	Record
77	April 2	Charlotte					Fiserv Forum	–
78	April 4	Brooklyn					Fiserv Forum	–
79	April 6	Chicago					Fiserv Forum	–
80	April 8	New York					Fiserv Forum	–
81	April 9	@ Chicago					United Center	–
82	April 11	@ Boston					TD Garden	–

2026–27 season schedule

== NBA Cup ==
=== East Group A ===
Pos	Team	Pld	W	L	PF	PA	PD	Qualification
1	Orlando Magic	3	3	0	341	324	+17	Advance to knockout stage
2	Toronto Raptors	3	2	1	340	330	+10	Possible knockout stage based on ranking
3	Detroit Pistons	2	1	1	212	199	+13	
4	Brooklyn Nets	2	0	2	205	223	−18	
5	Milwaukee Bucks	2	0	2	206	228	−22	

Updated to game(s) played on November 20, 2026. Source:

== Transactions ==
=== Overview ===
Players Added

Via draft

- Nate Ament
- Brayden Burries
- Bogoljub Marković

Via free agency

- Kam Jones

Via trade

- Tyler Herro
- Kasparas Jakučionis
- Jaime Jaquez Jr.
- Caris LeVert
- Kel'el Ware
Players Lost

Via trade

- Giannis Antetokounmpo
- Gary Harris
- Bobby Portis
- Taurean Prince

Via free agency

- Alex Antetokounmpo
- Andre Jackson Jr.

Waived

- Kevin Porter Jr.

=== Trades ===
Date	Trade		Ref.
June 24, 2026	Three-team trade		
June 24, 2026	To Milwaukee Bucks: Draft rights to Malique Lewis (No. 60) (from Washington)	To Orlando Magic: Draft rights to Izaiyah Nelson (No. 51) (from Washington); Cash considerations (from Milwaukee)	
June 24, 2026	To Washington Wizards: Draft rights to Felix Okpara (No. 46) (from Orlando)		
July 6, 2026	To Milwaukee Bucks: Tyler Herro; Kel'el Ware; Jaime Jaquez Jr.; Kasparas Jakučionis; Draft rights to Nate Ament (No. 13); 2030 pick swap; 2031 first-round picks; 2033 first-round pick; 2033 second-round pick	To Miami Heat: Giannis Antetokounmpo; Bobby Portis	

=== Free agency ===
==== Re-signed ====
Date	Player	Ref.
July 2, 2026	Simone Fontecchio	
July 9, 2026	Ousmane Dieng	
July 2, 2026	Gary Trent Jr.	
October 17, 2026	Pete Nance	

==== Additions ====
Date	Player	Former Team	Ref.
July 5, 2026	Kam Jones	Indiana Pacers	
September 4, 2026	John Butler Jr.	Wisconsin Herd (NBA G League)	

==== Subtractions ====
Player	Reason	New Team	Ref.
Andre Jackson Jr.	Free agency	Toronto Raptors	
Alex Antetokounmpo	Free agency	(Greece) Promitheas Patras	
Cole Anthony	Free agent	(Australia) Melbourne United	
Thanasis Antetokounmpo	Free agent	(Greece) Aris	
