= 2026–27 Los Angeles Clippers season =

- Head coach: Tyronn Lue
- President: Trent Redden (interim, basketball operations) (Note: Lawrence Frank was suspended for six months in September 2026 due to his role in the salary cap scandal. General manager Trent Redden was named to his position on an interim basis; Mark Hughes was named to fulfill Redden's role.); John Gibson (de facto, business operations) (Note: Gillian Zucker was suspended for one year in September 2026 due to her role in the salary cap scandal.) (Note: John Gibson is serving as interim team governor/CEO for one year while Steve Ballmer is suspended for his role in the salary cap scandal. He initially took oversight of the team's basketball and business operations before naming Trent Redden as president of the former two days later.)
- General manager: Mark Hughes (interim)
- Owner: Steve Ballmer (suspended)
- Arena: Intuit Dome

Results
- Record: 4–11 (.267)
- Place: Division: 4th (Pacific); Conference: 13th (Western)
- Stats at Basketball Reference

Local media
- Television: ClipperVision; Nexstar Media Group (Note: Affiliates include: KTLA (Los Angeles); KSWB-TV (San Diego); KGET-TV (Bakersfield); KSEE-TV/KGPE-TV (Fresno)) (10 simulcasts)
- Radio: KLAC

The 2026–27 Los Angeles Clippers season is the 57th season of the franchise in the National Basketball Association (NBA), their 49th season in Southern California, and their third season in Inglewood. This season is the first season without star player Kawhi Leonard since the 2018-19 NBA season, as he would be traded away to the Toronto Raptors for the second time in his career.

On September 2, 2026, following a year-long investigation, the NBA penalized the Clippers for salary cap circumvention involving Kawhi Leonard and handful of sponsors including the bankrupt Aspiration, Inc. The sanctions included a $30-million fine for the team, forfeiture of the team's first-round draft picks from 2029 to 2033 and a 2029 first-round pick acquired from the Indiana Pacers, a one-year suspension without pay for owner Steve Ballmer and president of business operations Gillian Zucker, a six-month suspension for president of basketball operations Lawrence Frank, and a $700,000 fine for Leonard. On September 14, Leonard was finally traded to the Toronto Raptors for Brandon Ingram, Gradey Dick, and five future draft picks, having been paused due to such investigation. Trial lawyer John S. Gibson, a longtime season ticket holder, was named the interim governor and chief executive officer (CEO) of the team on September 21; he assumed oversight of the team's basketball and business operations immediately. Gibson then named general manager Trent Redden as the interim president of basketball operations and Mark Hughes as the interim general manager two days later.

== Draft picks ==
Round	Pick	Player	Position	Nationality	College
1	5	Keaton Wagler	Guard	United States	Illinois
2	36	Baba Miller	Small forward	Spain	Cincinnati
2	52	Henri Veesaar	Center	Estonia	North Carolina

The Clippers entered the draft holding one first-round selection and two second-round selections, all acquired through previous trades. The lottery pick from the Indiana Pacers was conveyed to the team after landing outside its top 4 and 10th-to-30th protected ranges, the 36th pick was originally owned by the Memphis Grizzlies and conveyed to the team after falling outside the 43rd-to-60th protected range, and the 52nd pick was acquired from the Cleveland Cavaliers as an exchange for James Harden. The Clippers had traded their original first- and second-round selections to the Oklahoma City Thunder (as part of the 2019 Paul George trade) and the Houston Rockets (later conveyed to the Brooklyn Nets), respectively.

== Roster ==
Los Angeles Clippers roster
Players

Pos.	No.	Player	Height	Weight	DOB	From
G	3	Bradley Beal (injured)	6 ft 4 in (1.93 m)	207 lb (94 kg)	1993-06-28	Florida
G	24	Cam Christie (TW)	6 ft 5 in (1.96 m)	190 lb (86 kg)	2005-07-24	Minnesota
G/F	9	Gradey Dick	6 ft 7 in (2.01 m)	200 lb (91 kg)	2003-11-20	Kansas
G	8	Kris Dunn	6 ft 3 in (1.91 m)	205 lb (93 kg)	1994-03-18	Providence
G	10	Darius Garland	6 ft 1 in (1.85 m)	192 lb (87 kg)	2000-01-26	Vanderbilt
F	28	Rui Hachimura	6 ft 8 in (2.03 m)	230 lb (104 kg)	1998-02-08	Gonzaga
F	7	Brandon Ingram (injured)	6 ft 8 in (2.03 m)	190 lb (86 kg)	1997-09-02	Duke
F	23	Isaiah Jackson	6 ft 8 in (2.03 m)	205 lb (93 kg)	2002-01-10	Kentucky
F	5	Derrick Jones Jr.	6 ft 6 in (1.98 m)	210 lb (95 kg)	1997-02-15	UNLV
C	11	Brook Lopez	7 ft 1 in (2.16 m)	282 lb (128 kg)	1988-04-01	Stanford
F	12	Nick Martinelli (TW)	6 ft 7 in (2.01 m)	220 lb (100 kg)	2004-04-20	Northwestern
F	18	Baba Miller	6 ft 11 in (2.11 m)	204 lb (93 kg)	2004-02-07	Cincinnati
G	22	Jordan Miller (injured)	6 ft 5 in (1.96 m)	194 lb (88 kg)	2000-01-23	Miami (FL)
C	14	Yanic Konan Niederhäuser	6 ft 11 in (2.11 m)	242 lb (110 kg)	2003-03-14	Penn State
G	21	Jalen Pickett (TW)	6 ft 2 in (1.88 m)	202 lb (92 kg)	1999-10-22	Penn State
G	4	Kobe Sanders	6 ft 8 in (2.03 m)	207 lb (94 kg)	2002-05-30	Nevada
G/F	31	Max Strus	6 ft 5 in (1.96 m)	215 lb (98 kg)	1996-03-28	DePaul
G	1	Keaton Wagler	6 ft 6 in (1.98 m)	175 lb (79 kg)	2007-02-03	Illinois

Coaches
Head coach
- Tyronn Lue
Assistant(s)
- Jeremy Castleberry
- Larry Drew
- Shaun Fein
- Dahntay Jones
- Jay Larranaga
- Brian Shaw
- Jeff Van Gundy

Legend
- (DP) Unsigned draft pick
- (FA) Free agent
- (S) Suspended
- (GL) On assignment to G League affiliate
- (TW) Two-way affiliate player
- Injured

Roster
Updated: November 8, 2026

=== Roster Notes ===
- Forwards Rui Hachimura and Brandon Ingram become the 33rd and 34th former Lakers player to play for the crosstown rival Clippers.

== Standings ==
=== Division ===
Pacific Division	W	L	PCT	GB	Home	Road	Div	GP
Los Angeles Lakers	14	3	.824	–	7‍–‍2	7‍–‍1	6–1	17
Phoenix Suns	8	7	.533	5.0	5‍–‍4	3‍–‍3	3–2	15
Golden State Warriors	8	8	.500	5.5	6‍–‍1	2‍–‍7	3–2	16
Los Angeles Clippers	4	10	.286	8.5	4‍–‍4	0‍–‍6	1–4	14
Sacramento Kings	1	14	.067	12.0	0‍–‍9	1‍–‍5	0–4	15

=== Conference ===
Western Conference
#	Team	W	L	PCT	GB	GP
1	Los Angeles Lakers *	14	3	.824	–	17
2	San Antonio Spurs *	13	3	.813	0.5	16
3	Memphis Grizzlies	12	4	.750	1.5	16
4	Houston Rockets	12	5	.706	2.0	17
5	Minnesota Timberwolves *	11	5	.688	2.5	16
6	Portland Trail Blazers	10	5	.667	3.0	15
7	Denver Nuggets	9	5	.643	3.5	14
8	Oklahoma City Thunder	10	6	.625	3.5	16
9	Phoenix Suns	8	7	.533	5.0	15
10	Dallas Mavericks	8	7	.533	5.0	15
11	Golden State Warriors	8	8	.500	5.5	16
12	New Orleans Pelicans	5	12	.294	9.0	17
13	Los Angeles Clippers	4	10	.286	8.5	14
14	Utah Jazz	3	14	.176	11.0	17
15	Sacramento Kings	1	14	.067	12.0	15

== Game log ==
=== Preseason ===
2026 preseason game log
Total: 2–1 (Home: 2–0; Road: 0–1)
Preseason: 2–1 (home: 2–0; road: 0–1)

Game	Date	Team	Score	High points	High rebounds	High assists	Location Attendance	Record
1	October 4	Golden State	W 104–101	Rui Hachimura (21)	Cam Christie (8)	Darius Garland (6)	Stan Sheriff Center; 10,112	1–0
2	October 10	@ Toronto	L 106–114	Rui Hachimura (14)	Brook Lopez (7)	Kris Dunn (6)	(Canada) Rogers Arena; 18,872	1–1
3	October 14	Denver	W 122–110	Rui Hachimura (16)	Tied (5)	Darius Garland (7)	Intuit Dome; 13,018	2–1

2026–27 preseason schedule

=== Regular season ===
2026–27 game log
Total: 4–11 (Home: 4–4; Road: 0–7)
October: 1–4 (home: 1–1; road: 0–3)

Game	Date	Team	Score	High points	High rebounds	High assists	Location Attendance	Record
1	October 21	Sacramento	W 121–96	Darius Garland (30)	Brook Lopez (11)	Kris Dunn (7)	Intuit Dome; 17,927	1–0
2	October 23	@ L.A. Lakers	L 117–125	Darius Garland (26)	Hachimura, Jackson (6)	Darius Garland (6)	Crypto.com Arena; 19,057	1–1
3	October 25	@ Oklahoma City	L 101–108	Darius Garland (16)	Jackson, Jones Jr. (6)	Darius Garland (11)	Paycom Center; 18,203	1–2
4	October 28	L.A. Lakers	L 87–103	Keaton Wagler (21)	Baba Miller (7)	Darius Garland (5)	Intuit Dome; 17,927	1–3
5	October 30	@ Minnesota	L 101–127	Darius Garland (24)	Isaiah Jackson (7)	Kris Dunn (7)	Target Center; 17,593	1–4

November: 3–7 (home: 3–3; road: 0–4)

Game	Date	Team	Score	High points	High rebounds	High assists	Location Attendance	Record
6	November 1	@ Golden State	L 112–124	Rui Hachimura (24)	Isaiah Jackson (8)	Darius Garland (7)	Chase Center; 18,064	1–5
7	November 2	Toronto	L 118–125	Kobe Sanders (26)	Isaiah Jackson (8)	Darius Garland (8)	Intuit Dome; 16,044	1–6
8	November 4	Miami	L 116–117 (OT)	Darius Garland (26)	Rui Hachimura (9)	Garland, Hachimura (7)	Intuit Dome; 17,504	1–7
9	November 8	New Orleans	W 139–123	Darius Garland (24)	Brook Lopez (7)	Darius Garland (10)	Intuit Dome; 17,927	2–7
10	November 10	@ Phoenix	L 110–133	Tied (13)	Garland, Hachimura (5)	Kobe Sanders (7)	Mortgage Matchup Center; 17,071	2–8
11	November 13	Oklahoma City	W 113–112	Brook Lopez (26)	Rui Hachimura (11)	Darius Garland (7)	Intuit Dome; 17,927	3–8
12	November 15	Charlotte	W 113–106	Darius Garland (27)	Garland, Sanders (6)	Brook Lopez (8)	Intuit Dome; 17,487	4–8
13	November 17	Utah	L 107–132	Brook Lopez (23)	Brook Lopez (6)	Darius Garland (7)	Intuit Dome; 14,716	4–9
14	November 19	@ San Antonio	L 112–124	Garland, Lopez (23)	Rui Hachimura (7)	Darius Garland (5)	Frost Bank Center; 18,532	4–10
15	November 21	@ Dallas	L 100–110	Brook Lopez (21)	Rui Hachimura (8)	Kris Dunn (5)	American Airlines Center; 19,888	4–11
16	November 23	@ Houston					Toyota Center	–
17	November 25	@ Memphis					FedExForum	–
18	November 27	New Orleans					Intuit Dome	–
19	November 29	@ Golden State					Chase Center	–

December: 0–0 (home: 0–0; road: 0–0)

Game	Date	Team	Score	High points	High rebounds	High assists	Location Attendance	Record
20	December 1	@ Phoenix					Mortgage Matchup Center	–
21	December 2	Minnesota					Intuit Dome	–
22	TBD	TBD					TBD	–
23	TBD	TBD					TBD	–
24	December 13	@ San Antonio					Frost Bank Center	–
25	December 16	@ Charlotte					Spectrum Center	–
26	December 18	@ Miami					Kaseya Center	–
27	December 20	Indiana					Intuit Dome	–
28	December 21	Denver					Intuit Dome	–
29	December 23	Golden State					Intuit Dome	–
30	December 26	Memphis					Intuit Dome	–
31	December 27	Philadelphia					Intuit Dome	–
32	December 29	@ Indiana					Gainbridge Fieldhouse	–
33	December 31	@ Cleveland					Rocket Arena	–

January: 0–0 (home: 0–0; road: 0–0)

Game	Date	Team	Score	High points	High rebounds	High assists	Location Attendance	Record
34	January 1	@ Toronto					Scotiabank Arena	–
35	January 3	@ Washington					Capital One Arena	–
36	January 5	@ Orlando					Kia Center	–
37	January 7	@ Milwaukee					Fiserv Forum	–
38	January 9	Boston					Intuit Dome	–
39	January 11	L.A. Lakers					Intuit Dome	–
40	January 14	@ Sacramento					Golden 1 Center	–
41	January 15	Orlando					Intuit Dome	–
42	January 18	Phoenix					Intuit Dome	–
43	January 20	@ Utah					Delta Center	–
44	January 22	Washington					Intuit Dome	–
45	January 24	@ New York					Madison Square Garden	–
46	January 25	@ Philadelphia					Xfinity Mobile Arena	–
47	January 27	@ Boston					TD Garden	–
48	January 29	@ Brooklyn					Barclays Center	–

February: 0–0 (home: 0–0; road: 0–0)

Game	Date	Team	Score	High points	High rebounds	High assists	Location Attendance	Record
49	February 2	San Antonio					Intuit Dome	–
50	February 3	Golden State					Intuit Dome	–
51	February 5	@ Denver					Ball Arena	–
52	February 7	@ Dallas					American Airlines Center	–
53	February 9	Detroit					Intuit Dome	–
54	February 10	@ L.A. Lakers					Crypto.com Arena	–
55	February 12	@ Memphis					FedExForum	–
56	February 14	@ New Orleans					Smoothie King Center	–
57	February 16	Houston					Intuit Dome	–
58	February 17	Chicago					Intuit Dome	–
All-Star Game
59	February 25	Utah					Intuit Dome	–
60	February 28	Portland					Intuit Dome	–

March: 0–0 (home: 0–0; road: 0–0)

Game	Date	Team	Score	High points	High rebounds	High assists	Location Attendance	Record
61	March 2	@ Portland					Moda Center	–
62	March 4	Brooklyn					Intuit Dome	–
63	March 6	@ Sacramento					Golden 1 Center	–
64	March 8	Houston					Intuit Dome	–
65	March 10	New York					Intuit Dome	–
66	March 11	Cleveland					Intuit Dome	–
67	March 13	@ Portland					Moda Center	–
68	March 16	Denver					Intuit Dome	–
69	March 18	Memphis					Intuit Dome	–
70	March 20	Atlanta					Intuit Dome	–
71	March 22	Dallas					Intuit Dome	–
72	March 24	Milwaukee					Intuit Dome	–
73	March 26	@ Oklahoma City					Paycom Center	–
74	March 27	@ Chicago					United Center	–
75	March 29	@ Detroit					Little Caesars Arena	–
76	March 31	@ Atlanta					State Farm Arena	–

April: 0–0 (home: 0–0; road: 0–0)

Game	Date	Team	Score	High points	High rebounds	High assists	Location Attendance	Record
77	April 2	San Antonio					Intuit Dome	–
78	April 4	Phoenix					Intuit Dome	–
79	April 6	Minnesota					Intuit Dome	–
80	April 8	@ Denver					Ball Arena	–
81	April 9	@ Utah					Delta Center	–
82	April 11	Sacramento					Intuit Dome	–

2026–27 season schedule

== NBA Cup ==
=== West Group B ===
Pos	Team	Pld	W	L	PF	PA	PD	Qualification
1	Minnesota Timberwolves	2	2	0	242	210	+32	Advance to knockout stage
2	Oklahoma City Thunder	3	2	1	366	330	+36	Possible knockout stage based on ranking
3	Memphis Grizzlies	2	1	1	239	239	0	
4	Los Angeles Clippers	2	1	1	214	239	−25	
5	New Orleans Pelicans	3	0	3	340	383	−43	

Updated to game(s) played on November 20, 2026. Source:

== Transactions ==
=== Trades ===
Date	Trade		Ref.
June 24, 2026	To Los Angeles Clippers: Draft rights to Narcisse Ngoy (No. 57); Cash considerations	To Atlanta Hawks: Draft rights to Henri Veesaar (No. 52)	
June 24, 2026	To Los Angeles Clippers: Draft rights to Nick Martinelli (No. 55)	To Houston Rockets: Cash considerations	
July 9, 2026	Six-team trade		
July 9, 2026	To Los Angeles Clippers: 2028 protected second-round pick (from Detroit)	To Detroit Pistons: John Collins (sign-and-trade) (from Los Angeles); Gary Harris (from Milwaukee); Taurean Prince (from Milwaukee); 2029 second-round pick (from Memphis); 2031 DAL second-round pick (from Memphis); 2032 DET second-round pick (from Memphis)	
July 9, 2026	To Dallas Mavericks: Santi Aldama (from Memphis); Marcus Sasser (from Detroit); Draft rights to Tarik Biberović (2023 No. 56) (from Memphis)	To Memphis Grizzlies: AJ Johnson (from Dallas); D'Angelo Russell (from Washington); Isaiah Stewart (from Detroit); 2029 HOU second-round pick (from Dallas); 2029 LAL second-round pick (from Washington); 2030 GSW protected first-round pick (from Dallas); 2032 second-round pick swap right (from Washington); 2033 WAS second-round pick (from Washington)	
July 9, 2026	To Milwaukee Bucks: Caris LeVert (from Detroit); 2027 MIL second-round pick (from Detroit); 2027 second-round pick (from Detroit)	To Washington Wizards: Khris Middleton (sign-and-trade) (from Dallas); 2033 DAL second-round pick (from Dallas)	
July 28, 2026	To Los Angeles Clippers: Johni Broome; 2027 second-round pick (Note: Los Angeles will receive the second most favorable pick out of three possibilities: 1) the most favorable of the picks originally belonging to Houston, Indiana, Miami, and Oklahoma City; 2) the more favorable of the picks originally belonging to Golden State and Phoenix; 3) Philadelphia's own pick.)	To Philadelphia 76ers: Cash considerations	
August 20, 2026
August 20, 2026	Five-team trade		
August 20, 2026	To Los Angeles Clippers: Max Strus (from Cleveland)	To Cleveland Cavaliers: Peyton Watson (sign-and-trade) (from Denver); Cam Whitmore (from Washington); Draft rights to Ismaël Kamagate (2022 No. 46) (from Los Angeles)	
August 20, 2026	To Denver Nuggets: Julian Reese (two-way contract) (from Washington); 2031 CLE first-round pick (from Cleveland); 2032 SAC second-round pick (from Cleveland)	To Charlotte Hornets: Dennis Schröder (from Cleveland); Cash considerations (from Cleveland)	
August 20, 2026	To Washington Wizards: Tre Mann (from Charlotte); 2027 second-round pick (Note: Los Angeles Clippers will receive the second most favorable pick out of three possibilities: 1) the most favorable of the picks originally belonging to Houston Rockets, Indiana Pacers, Miami Heat, and Oklahoma City Thunder; 2) the more favorable of the picks originally belonging to Golden State Warriors and Phoenix Suns; 3) Philadelphia 76ers' own pick.) (from Los Angeles); Cash considerations (from Cleveland)		
September 14, 2026	To Los Angeles Clippers: Gradey Dick; Brandon Ingram; 2027 first-round pick swap right (Note: Oklahoma City has the right to swap picks with Los Angeles, after which the Clippers can swap with Toronto.); 2030 TOR second-round pick; 2031 TOR first-round pick; 2033 TOR first-round pick; 2033 TOR second-round pick	To Toronto Raptors: Kawhi Leonard	

=== Free agency ===
==== Re-signed ====
Date	Player	Ref.
July 7	Kobe Sanders	
July 9	Jordan Miller	
August 13	Bradley Beal	
October 17	Cam Christie (two-way contract) (previously waived on October 14)	

==== Additions ====
Date	Player	Former Team	Ref.
July 6	Rui Hachimura	Los Angeles Lakers	
July 21	Jamarion Sharp (Two-way contract)	(Puerto Rico) Vaqueros de Bayamón	
August 10	Yuki Kawamura (Exhibit 10 contract)	Indiana Pacers	
August 12	Jalen Pickett (Two-way contract)	Denver Nuggets	
October 7	Jahmyl Telfort (Exhibit 10 contract)	San Diego Clippers	
October 13	Fletcher Loyer (Exhibit 10 contract) (previously signed an Exhibit 10 contract on July 5 and waived on October 6)	Purdue Boilermakers	
October 15	DeAndre Williams (Exhibit 10 contract)	(Puerto Rico) Gigantes de Carolina	
October 15	Nathan Mensah (Exhibit 10 contract)	(Turkey) Petkim Spor	
October 15	Miye Oni (Exhibit 10 contract)	(Puerto Rico) Osos de Manatí	
October 29	Blake Wesley (10-day contract) (previously signed an Exhibit 10 contract on September 27 and waived on October 17)	San Diego Clippers	

==== Subtractions ====
Player	Reason	New Team	Ref.
Bogdan Bogdanović	Free agency	Houston Rockets	
Sean Pedulla	Waived	Houston Rockets	
TyTy Washington Jr.	Free agency	(France) ASVEL Basket	
Bennedict Mathurin	Free agency	New Orleans Pelicans	
Nicolas Batum	Free agency	Retired	
Norchad Omier	Free agency	Minnesota Timberwolves	
Johni Broome	Waived	Milwaukee Bucks	
Jamarion Sharp	Waived	Toronto Raptors	
Yuki Kawamura	Waived	San Diego Clippers	
Fletcher Loyer	Waived	San Diego Clippers	
DeAndre Williams	Waived	San Diego Clippers	
Nathan Mensah	Waived	San Diego Clippers	
Miye Oni	Waived	San Diego Clippers	
Jahmyl Telfort	Waived	San Diego Clippers	
Blake Wesley	Contract ended	San Diego Clippers	
