= 2026–27 Dallas Mavericks season =

- Head coach: Dusty May
- President: Ethan Casson (business operations); Masai Ujiri (basketball operations)
- General manager: Mike Schmitz
- Owner(s): Patrick Dumont (majority); Mark Cuban (minority)
- Arena: American Airlines Center

Results
- Record: 9–7 (.563)
- Place: Division: 4th (Southwest); Conference: 9th (Western)
- Stats at Basketball Reference

Local media
- Television: TEGNA Inc. (Note: Affiliates include: KFAA-TV/WFAA (Dallas-Fort Worth); KCEN-TV/KCEN-DT2 (Waco); KAGS-LD/KAGS-DT2 (Bryan-College Station); KYTX/KYTX-DT2/KYTX-DT3 (Tyler-Longview); KWES-TV/KWES-DT2 (Midland-Odessa); KXVA/KXVA-DT2 (Abilene); KIDY/KIDY-DT2 (San Angelo); KFDA-TV/KFDA-DT2 (Amarillo); KDBC-DT2 (El Paso); KGBT-TV (Harlingen); KXNU-LD/KGNS-TV/KGNS-DT2/KYLX-DT2 (Laredo); KCBD/KMYL/KLCW (Lubbock); KXII/KXII-DT2 (Sherman); KSHV-TV (Texarkana-Shreveport); KJBO/KJBO-DT2 (Wichita Falls-Lawton))
- Radio: KRLD-FM

The 2026–27 Dallas Mavericks season is the 47th season for the franchise in the National Basketball Association (NBA). On May 4, 2026, Masai Ujiri was named as President for Basketball Operations and Alternate Governor. On May 19, 2026, the Mavericks and head coach Jason Kidd mutually agreed to part ways. On June 23, Michigan head coach Dusty May was hired as the team's head coach.

== Draft picks ==
Round	Pick	Player	Position	Nationality	College
1	9	Morez Johnson Jr.	PF	United States	Michigan
1	30	Koa Peat	SF	United States	Arizona
2	48	Tobi Lawal	PF	United Kingdom	Virginia Tech

The Mavericks entered the draft holding two first-round selections and one second-round selection. Their own first-round selection landed ninth overall following the NBA draft lottery, while the two other selections were originally owned by the Oklahoma City Thunder and the Phoenix Suns, before Dallas acquired them from the Washington Wizards through the 2026 Anthony Davis trade. The additional first-round selection was conveyed to the team as it became the least favorable pick when its original owner, Oklahoma City, clinched the league's best record in the 2025–26 season. The Mavericks had also traded their original second-round pick to Oklahoma City in 2020.

== Roster ==
Dallas Mavericks roster
Players

Pos.	No.	Player	Height	Weight	DOB	From
F/C	34	Santi Aldama	7 ft 0 in (2.13 m)	215 lb (98 kg)	2001-01-10	Loyola (MD)
F	13	Tarik Biberović	6 ft 7 in (2.01 m)	218 lb (99 kg)	2001-01-28	Bosnia and Herzegovina
G	0	Max Christie	6 ft 5 in (1.96 m)	190 lb (86 kg)	2003-02-10	Michigan State
C	30	Moussa Cissé	6 ft 11 in (2.11 m)	220 lb (100 kg)	2002-09-10	Memphis
G	1	Walter Clayton Jr. (TW)	6 ft 3 in (1.91 m)	195 lb (88 kg)	2003-03-06	Florida
G	55	Sergio de Larrea	6 ft 6 in (1.98 m)	175 lb (79 kg)	2005-12-04	Spain
F	32	Cooper Flagg	6 ft 10 in (2.08 m)	205 lb (93 kg)	2006-12-21	Duke
F/C	21	Daniel Gafford	6 ft 10 in (2.08 m)	265 lb (120 kg)	1998-10-01	Arkansas
G	9	Jett Howard (TW)	6 ft 8 in (2.03 m)	215 lb (98 kg)	2003-09-14	Michigan
G	11	Kyrie Irving	6 ft 2 in (1.88 m)	195 lb (88 kg)	1992-03-23	Duke
G	14	Morez Johnson Jr.	6 ft 10 in (2.08 m)	250 lb (113 kg)	2006-01-25	Michigan
F	33	Tobi Lawal (TW)	6 ft 7 in (2.01 m)	215 lb (98 kg)	2003-05-01	Virginia Tech
C	2	Dereck Lively II (injured)	7 ft 1 in (2.16 m)	230 lb (104 kg)	2004-02-12	Duke
F	3	Naji Marshall	6 ft 6 in (1.98 m)	220 lb (100 kg)	1998-01-24	Xavier
F	16	Caleb Martin	6 ft 5 in (1.96 m)	205 lb (93 kg)	1995-09-28	Nevada
F	10	Zaccharie Risacher	6 ft 8 in (2.03 m)	200 lb (91 kg)	2005-04-08	France
G	8	Marcus Sasser	6 ft 2 in (1.88 m)	195 lb (88 kg)	2000-09-21	Houston
F	25	P. J. Washington	6 ft 6 in (1.98 m)	230 lb (104 kg)	1998-08-23	Kentucky

Coaches
Head coach
- Dusty May
Assistant(s)
- Joe Boylan
- Rob Fodor
- Willie Green
- Sam Hershberger
- Mody Maor
- Garrett Temple
- Drew Williamson

Legend
- (DP) Unsigned draft pick
- (FA) Free agent
- (S) Suspended
- (GL) On assignment to G League affiliate
- (TW) Two-way affiliate player
- Injured

Roster
Updated: October 21, 2026

== Standings ==
=== Division ===
Southwest Division	W	L	PCT	GB	Home	Road	Div	GP
San Antonio Spurs	14	3	.824	–	7‍–‍3	7‍–‍0	3–1	17
Houston Rockets	12	5	.706	2.0	7‍–‍1	5‍–‍4	2–1	17
Memphis Grizzlies	12	5	.706	2.0	4‍–‍4	8‍–‍1	1–1	17
Dallas Mavericks	9	7	.563	4.5	7‍–‍2	2‍–‍5	1–3	16
New Orleans Pelicans	5	13	.278	9.5	4‍–‍7	1‍–‍6	1–2	18

=== Conference ===
Western Conference
#	Team	W	L	PCT	GB	GP
1	San Antonio Spurs *	14	3	.824	–	17
2	Los Angeles Lakers *	14	3	.824	–	17
3	Minnesota Timberwolves *	12	5	.706	2.0	17
4	Houston Rockets	12	5	.706	2.0	17
5	Memphis Grizzlies	12	5	.706	2.0	17
6	Denver Nuggets	9	5	.643	3.5	14
7	Portland Trail Blazers	10	6	.625	3.5	16
8	Oklahoma City Thunder	10	6	.625	3.5	16
9	Dallas Mavericks	9	7	.563	4.5	16
10	Phoenix Suns	8	7	.533	5.0	15
11	Golden State Warriors	8	8	.500	5.5	16
12	New Orleans Pelicans	5	13	.278	9.5	18
13	Los Angeles Clippers	4	11	.267	9.0	15
14	Utah Jazz	3	14	.176	11.0	17
15	Sacramento Kings	2	14	.125	11.5	16

== Game log ==
=== Preseason ===
The schedule was announced on July 22, 2026.

2026 preseason game log
Total: 1–3 (Home: 0–3; Road: 1–0)
Preseason: 1–3 (home: 0–3; road: 1–0)

Game	Date	Team	Score	High points	High rebounds	High assists	Location Attendance	Record
1	October 9	Houston	L 117–135	Cooper Flagg (19)	Zaccharie Risacher (8)	Dwight Powell (8)	(Macau) Venetian Arena; 11,564	0–1
2	October 11	@ Houston	W 132–115	Kyrie Irving (17)	Sergio de Larrea (7)	Cooper Flagg (7)	(Macau) Venetian Arena; 11,711	1–1
3	October 14	New Orleans	L 97–101	Lawal, Poulakidas (16)	P. J. Washington (7)	Sergio de Larrea (6)	American Airlines Center; 17,140	1–2
4	October 16	Atlanta	L 111–135	Cooper Flagg (26)	Cooper Flagg (12)	Irving, Marshall (5)	American Airlines Center; 19,178	1–3

2026–27 preseason schedule

=== Regular season ===
The schedule was announced on August 13, 2026.

2026–27 game log
Total: 9–7 (Home: 7–2; Road: 2–5)
October: 4–2 (home: 2–1; road: 2–1)

Game	Date	Team	Score	High points	High rebounds	High assists	Location Attendance	Record
1	October 21	@ Houston	L 110–128	Cooper Flagg (32)	Zaccharie Risacher (6)	Naji Marshall (6)	Toyota Center; 18,055	0–1
2	October 23	@ Indiana	W 121–105	Kyrie Irving (24)	P. J. Washington (13)	Flagg, Marshall (6)	Gainbridge Fieldhouse; 17,274	1–1
3	October 24	San Antonio	L 106–122	Sergio de Larrea (21)	Daniel Gafford (9)	three players (5)	American Airlines Center; 19,555	1–2
4	October 26	@ Miami	W 113–109	Cooper Flagg (29)	Risacher, Washington (9)	Cooper Flagg (11)	Kaseya Center; 19,611	2–2
5	October 28	Oklahoma City	W 120–96	Cooper Flagg (26)	Daniel Gafford (11)	Cooper Flagg (8)	American Airlines Center; 18,111	3–2
6	October 30	Houston	W 116–111	Kyrie Irving (35)	P. J. Washington (10)	Kyrie Irving (9)	American Airlines Center; 18,832	4–2

November: 5–5 (home: 5–1; road: 0–4)

Game	Date	Team	Score	High points	High rebounds	High assists	Location Attendance	Record
7	November 2	Sacramento	L 100–115	Clayton Jr., Gafford (20)	Daniel Gafford (7)	Naji Marshall (7)	American Airlines Center; 18,967	4–3
8	November 4	@ San Antonio	L 111–112	Kyrie Irving (29)	Flagg, Washington (10)	three players (5)	Frost Bank Center; 18,354	4–4
9	November 6	Utah	W 112–100	P.J. Washington (26)	Morez Johnson Jr. (17)	Cooper Flagg (7)	American Airlines Center; 19,568	5–4
10	November 8	Brooklyn	W 130–93	Cooper Flagg (25)	Morez Johnson Jr. (9)	Cooper Flagg (12)	American Airlines Center; 19,184	6–4
11	November 9	Indiana	W 125–122	Cooper Flagg (43)	Cooper Flagg (10)	Cooper Flagg (6)	American Airlines Center; 19,065	7–4
12	November 12	@ Minnesota	L 94–133	Zaccharie Risacher (22)	Cooper Flagg (7)	Caleb Martin (5)	Target Center; 17,856	7–5
13	November 14	@ Cleveland	L 117–127	Kyrie Irving (34)	Flagg, Martin (8)	three players (5)	Rocket Arena; 19,432	7–6
14	November 15	@ Boston	L 94–131	Zaccharie Risacher (18)	Morez Johnson Jr. (6)	Caleb Martin (5)	TD Garden; 19,156	7–7
15	November 18	Golden State	W 116–94	Cooper Flagg (33)	Gafford, Irving (6)	Cooper Flagg (9)	American Airlines Center; 19,616	8–7
16	November 21	L.A. Clippers	W 110–100	Kyrie Irving (25)	Daniel Gafford (10)	Cooper Flagg (8)	American Airlines Center; 19,888	9–7
17	November 22	@ Utah					Delta Center	
18	November 24	@ Denver					Ball Arena	
19	November 27	@ Phoenix					Mortgage Matchup Center	
20	November 30	Boston					American Airlines Center	

December: 0–0 (home: 0–0; road: 0–0)

Game	Date	Team	Score	High points	High rebounds	High assists	Location Attendance	Record
21	December 2	Orlando					American Airlines Center	
22	TBD	TBD					TBD	
23	TBD	TBD					TBD	
24	December 14	Milwaukee					American Airlines Center	
25	December 16	@ Brooklyn					Barclays Center	
26	December 17	@ Philadelphia					Xfinity Mobile Arena	
27	December 19	Chicago					American Airlines Center	
28	December 22	@ Golden State					Chase Center	
29	December 23	@ Sacramento					Golden 1 Center	
30	December 26	Phoenix					American Airlines Center	
31	December 29	Miami					American Airlines Center	

January: 0–0 (home: 0–0; road: 0–0)

Game	Date	Team	Score	High points	High rebounds	High assists	Location Attendance	Record
32	January 1	@ Houston					Toyota Center	
33	January 2	@ Atlanta					State Farm Arena	
34	January 4	@ New Orleans					Smoothie King Center	
35	January 7	Portland					American Airlines Center	
36	January 8	Phoenix					American Airlines Center	
37	January 10	@ Memphis					FedExForum	
38	January 12	@ Memphis					FedExForum	
39	January 14	@ Detroit					Little Caesars Arena	
40	January 16	@ New York					Madison Square Garden	
41	January 18	Oklahoma City					American Airlines Center	
42	January 19	Charlotte					American Airlines Center	
43	January 22	@ New Orleans					Smoothie King Center	
44	January 23	Cleveland					American Airlines Center	
45	January 25	@ Chicago					United Center	
46	January 27	@ Toronto					Scotiabank Arena	
47	January 29	Detroit					American Airlines Center	
48	January 31	Houston					American Airlines Center	

February: 0–0 (home: 0–0; road: 0–0)

Game	Date	Team	Score	High points	High rebounds	High assists	Location Attendance	Record
49	February 2	Toronto					American Airlines Center	
50	February 4	@ Denver					Ball Arena	
51	February 6	Utah					American Airlines Center	
52	February 7	L.A. Clippers					American Airlines Center	
53	February 9	San Antonio					American Airlines Center	
54	February 11	Portland					American Airlines Center	
55	February 13	@ Charlotte					Spectrum Center	
56	February 15	Philadelphia					American Airlines Center	
57	February 17	@ Orlando					Kia Center	
All-Star Game
58	February 25	@ Golden State					Chase Center	
59	February 26	@ Portland					Moda Center	
60	February 28	L.A. Lakers					American Airlines Center	

March: 0–0 (home: 0–0; road: 0–0)

Game	Date	Team	Score	High points	High rebounds	High assists	Location Attendance	Record
61	March 2	Golden State					American Airlines Center	
62	March 4	New York					American Airlines Center	
63	March 8	@ Oklahoma City					Paycom Center	
64	March 9	Memphis					American Airlines Center	
65	March 11	Washington					American Airlines Center	
66	March 13	New Orleans					American Airlines Center	
67	March 15	Atlanta					American Airlines Center	
68	March 17	@ Oklahoma City					Paycom Center	
69	March 19	@ San Antonio					Frost Bank Center	
70	March 21	@ L.A. Lakers					Crypto.com Arena	
71	March 22	@ L.A. Clippers					Intuit Dome	
72	March 24	@ Minnesota					Target Center	
73	March 26	New Orleans					American Airlines Center	
74	March 28	@ Washington					Capital One Arena	
75	March 29	@ Milwaukee					Fiserv Forum	
76	March 31	Denver					American Airlines Center	

April: 0–0 (home: 0–0; road: 0–0)

Game	Date	Team	Score	High points	High rebounds	High assists	Location Attendance	Record
77	April 2	Sacramento					American Airlines Center	
78	April 4	Minnesota					American Airlines Center	
79	April 6	@ L.A. Lakers					Crypto.com Arena	
80	April 7	@ Portland					Moda Center	
81	April 9	@ Sacramento					Golden 1 Center	
82	April 11	Memphis					American Airlines Center	

2026–27 season schedule

== NBA Cup ==
=== West Group A ===
Pos	Team	Pld	W	L	PF	PA	PD	Qualification
1	Dallas Mavericks	2	2	0	228	211	+17	Advance to knockout stage
2	Denver Nuggets	2	2	0	260	244	+16	Possible knockout stage based on ranking
3	Phoenix Suns	2	1	1	231	228	+3	
4	Houston Rockets	3	1	2	360	367	−7	
5	Utah Jazz	3	0	3	319	348	−29	

Updated to game(s) played on November 20, 2026. Source:

2026–27 game log
Total: 0–0 (Home: 0–0; Road: 0–0)
NBA Cup: 0–0 (home: 0–0; road: 0–0)

Game	Date	Team	Score	High points	High rebounds	High assists	Location Attendance	Record
1	October 30	Houston					American Airlines Center	
2	November 6	Utah					American Airlines Center	
3	November 24	@ Denver					Ball Arena	
4	November 27	@ Phoenix					Mortgage Matchup Center	

== Transactions ==
=== Trades ===
Date	Trade		Ref.
June 24, 2026	Four-team trade		
June 24, 2026	To Dallas Mavericks: Draft rights to Sergio de Larrea (No. 25) (from Los Angeles)	To Los Angeles Lakers: Draft rights to Cameron Carr (No. 24) (from New York)	
June 24, 2026	To New York Knicks: Draft rights to Melvin Ajinça (2024 No. 51) (from Dallas); Draft rights to Chinemelu Elonu (2009 No. 59) (from Los Angeles); Draft rights to Louis Labeyrie (2014 No. 57) (from Los Angeles); 2026 PHI second-round pick (No. 47) (from Phoenix); 2029 PHX second-round pick (from Phoenix); 2030 PHI second-round pick (from Dallas); 2032 DAL second-round pick (from Dallas); 2033 PHX second-round pick (from Phoenix); Cash considerations (from Los Angeles); Cash considerations (from Phoenix)	To Phoenix Suns: Draft rights to Koa Peat (No. 30) (from Dallas)	
June 24, 2026	To Dallas Mavericks: Draft rights to Vsevolod Ishchenko (No. 56)	To Los Angeles Lakers: Cash considerations	
July 9, 2026	Six-team trade		
July 9, 2026	To Dallas Mavericks: Santi Aldama (from Memphis); Marcus Sasser (from Detroit); Draft rights to Tarik Biberović (2023 No. 56) (from Memphis)	To Detroit Pistons: John Collins (sign-and-trade) (from Los Angeles); Gary Harris (from Milwaukee); Taurean Prince (from Milwaukee); 2029 second-round pick (from Memphis); 2031 DAL second-round pick (from Memphis); 2032 DET second-round pick (from Memphis)	
July 9, 2026	To Los Angeles Clippers: 2028 protected second-round pick (from Detroit)	To Memphis Grizzlies: AJ Johnson (from Dallas); D'Angelo Russell (from Washington); Isaiah Stewart (from Detroit); 2029 HOU second-round pick (from Dallas); 2029 LAL second-round pick (from Washington); 2030 GSW protected first-round pick (from Dallas); 2032 second-round pick swap right (from Washington); 2033 WAS second-round pick (from Washington)	
July 9, 2026	To Milwaukee Bucks: Caris LeVert (from Detroit); 2027 MIL second-round pick (from Detroit); 2027 second-round pick (from Detroit)	To Washington Wizards: Khris Middleton (sign-and-trade) (from Dallas); 2033 DAL second-round pick (from Dallas)	
July 19, 2026	Three-team trade		
July 19, 2026	To Dallas Mavericks: Zaccharie Risacher (from Atlanta); Protected second-round pick (from Atlanta)	To Atlanta Hawks: Luguentz Dort (from Oklahoma City); Ryan Nembhard (from Dallas)	
July 19, 2026	To Oklahoma City Thunder: 2027 CHI second-round pick (from Dallas); 2031 second-round pick (from Atlanta); 2032 second-round pick (from Atlanta)		

=== Free agency ===
==== Re-signed ====
Date	Player	Ref.
Tarik Biberović	July 9	
Moussa Cissé	July 22	
Naji Marshall	August 2	

==== Additions ====
Date	Player	Former Team	Ref.
Jett Howard	July 20	Osceola Magic	

==== Subtractions ====
Player	Date	New Team	Ref.
Marvin Bagley III	July 16	Denver Nuggets	
Tyler Smith	July 20		
Klay Thompson	August 21	Miami Heat	
Brandon Williams	August 26	Golden State Warriors	
