= Mark Hughes (basketball) =

American basketball player-coach

- Hughes in 2009

No. 55 – Los Angeles Clippers
- Title: Senior vice president Assistant general manager
- League: NBA

Personal information
- Born: October 5, 1966 (age 60) Muskegon, Michigan, U.S.
- Listed height: 6 ft 8 in (2.03 m)
- Listed weight: 235 lb (107 kg)

Career information
- High school: Reeths-Puffer High School (Muskegon Township, Michigan)
- College: Michigan (1985–1989)
- Position: Center

Mark Hughes (born October 5, 1966) is an American executive, coach, and former professional basketball player. He is currently the interim general manager of the Los Angeles Clippers of the National Basketball Association (NBA).

== Early life and career ==
Hughes was born in Muskegon, Michigan and attended Reeths-Puffer High School in Muskegon, where he led the Rockets to the Class B State Semifinal in 1985. Hughes earned First team All State honors.

He played at the collegiate level for University of Michigan between 1985 and 1989, and was a co-captain of the 1989 NCAA championship team. Hughes went undrafted in the National Basketball Association, but was signed to contracts by the hometown Detroit Pistons in and Toronto Raptors in 1996, although he would not play a game in the league. He played professionally in France for Tours BC and Italy for Scaini Venezia in 1991 to 1993. From 1995 to 1998, he played for the Grand Rapids Hoops of the Continental Basketball Association, and was the team's head coach from 1997 to 2002.

He worked as an assistant coach in the NBA for the Orlando Magic between 2002 and 2004, and Sacramento Kings in 2006–07.

Between 2007 and 2011, Hughes worked as a scout for the New York Knicks. In 2011, Hughes became the Director of Player Personnel for the Knicks.

On August 2017, Hughes was hired as assistant general manager of the Los Angeles Clippers. In 2023, he was promoted to senior vice president of the team while retaining his managerial role.

Hughes was named in an October 2024 lawsuit between the Los Angeles Clippers and former strength and conditioning coach Randy Shelton, who was fired in July 2023. Shelton alleged that Hughes committed NBA tampering violations in an effort to attract Kawhi Leonard by soliciting him numerous times for information on Leonard's contractual obligations with the Spurs and his medical circumstances, with the alleged communication starting shortly after Leonard sustained an ankle injury in the 2017 NBA Western Conference finals. Leonard became a member of the Clippers in 2019. Hughes was subsequently named the interim general manager of the Clippers in September 2026, taking over the role from Trent Redden as the latter was named the interim president of basketball operations after Lawrence Frank was suspended for six months for his role in the team's salary cap scandal.
