= Brandon Ingram =

American basketball player (born 1997)

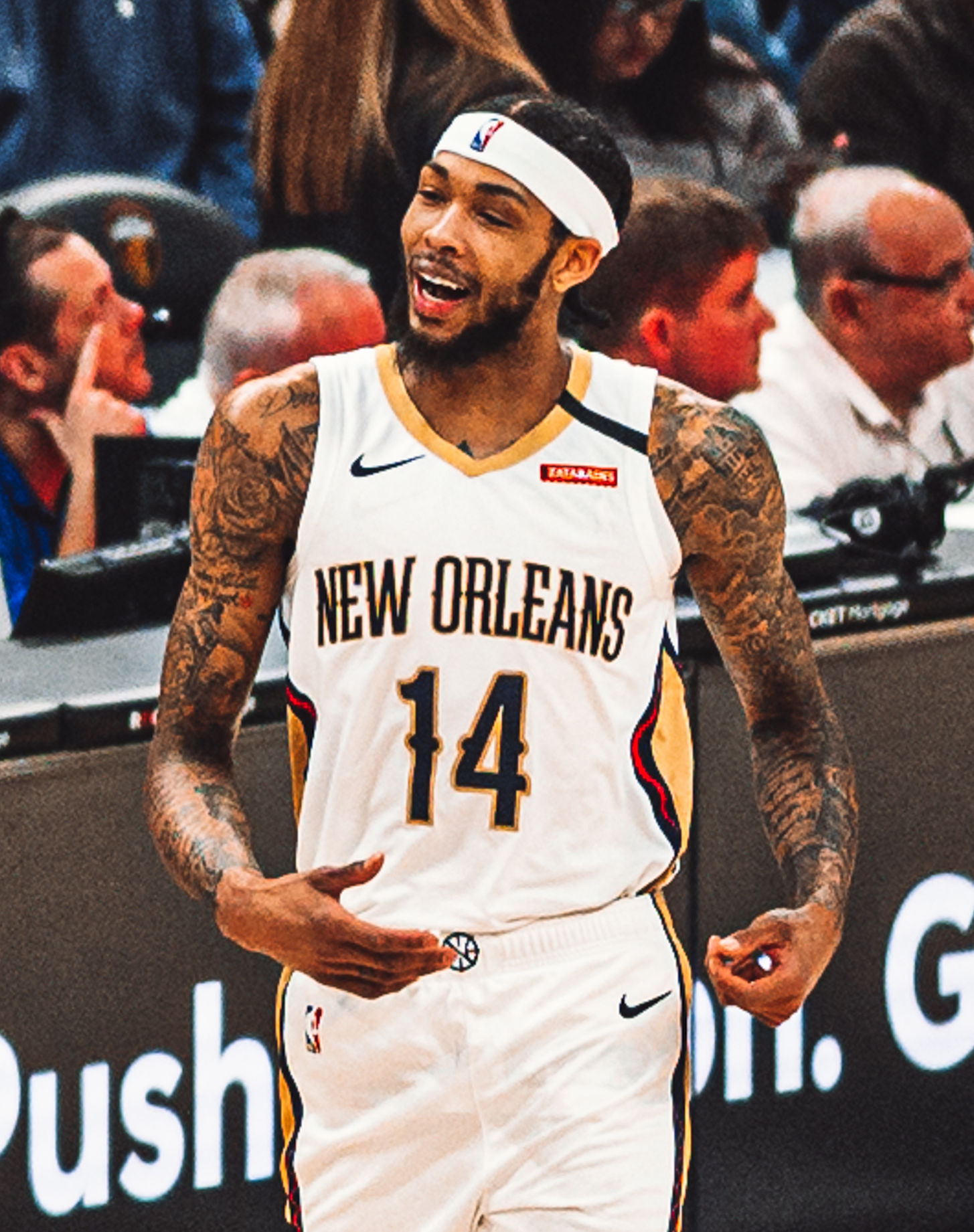
- Ingram with the New Orleans Pelicans in 2020

No. 7 – Los Angeles Clippers
- Position: Small forward
- League: NBA

Personal information
- Born: September 2, 1997 (age 29) Kinston, North Carolina, U.S.
- Listed height: 6 ft 8 in (2.03 m)
- Listed weight: 190 lb (86 kg)

Career information
- High school: Kinston (Kinston, North Carolina)
- College: Duke (2015–2016)
- NBA draft: 2016: 1st round, 2nd overall pick
- Drafted by: Los Angeles Lakers
- Playing career: 2016–present

Career history
- 2016–2019: Los Angeles Lakers
- 2019–2025: New Orleans Pelicans
- 2025–2026: Toronto Raptors
- 2026–present: Los Angeles Clippers

Career highlights
- 2× NBA All-Star (2020, 2026); NBA Most Improved Player (2020); NBA All-Rookie Second Team (2017); AP Honorable Mention All-American (2016); Second-team All-ACC (2016); ACC Rookie of the Year (2016); McDonald's All-American (2015); First-team Parade All-American (2015); North Carolina Mr. Basketball (2015)
- Stats at NBA.com
- Stats at Basketball Reference

Brandon Xavier Ingram (born September 2, 1997) is an American professional basketball player for the Los Angeles Clippers of the National Basketball Association (NBA). He is a two-time NBA All-Star and was named the NBA Most Improved Player in 2020. He was selected by the Los Angeles Lakers with the second overall pick in the 2016 NBA draft, and was named to the NBA All-Rookie Second Team in the same season.

Ingram had a successful high school career in North Carolina, where he won state titles each of his four years, and was named North Carolina's Mr. Basketball. He played one season of college basketball for the Duke Blue Devils, where he was named Atlantic Coast Conference Rookie of the Year. After the season, Ingram decided to forgo his remaining college eligibility and declared for the NBA draft. He played three seasons with the Lakers before being traded to the New Orleans Pelicans in 2019 as part of a package for All-Star Anthony Davis.

== Early life ==
Ingram was born on September 2, 1997, in Kinston, North Carolina. He is the son of Donald and Joann Ingram. He has two half-siblings, an older brother, Donovan, and an older sister, Brittany. He shares a father with Donovan and a mother with Brittany. Ingram's father started his career as a police officer and a manager of a local gym, but he is now full-time at a welding plant, where he makes forklifts. Before that, Donald was a would-be hoops star, pushing his way through the semi-pro leagues. When he moved back home to Kinston, his father started playing pickup games with a young Jerry Stackhouse, who was looking to play locally against older and more experienced players to help him elevate his game. Stackhouse, an ex-NBA star and Kinston native, forged a friendship with Ingram's father on the court.

While Ingram grew up in a one-story house on Highland Avenue in Kinston, his brother Donovan grew up in a different house but would spend weekends with Brandon, teaching him basketball. Ingram was able to keep a steady focus on basketball despite a high crime rate in the local community in Kinston. Before Ingram was a teenager, his brother allowed him to play with him and his older friends. He described this experience as "the best thing that ever happened to my game". His brother, known as Bo, went on to play college basketball for South Plains College (2008–2010) and UT Arlington (2010–2012). By the time Brandon reached eighth grade, Stackhouse became Ingram's Amateur Athletic Union (AAU) coach and mentored the young basketball player. Those influences "took me to the next level", said Ingram, whose foundation as a player came from his father. His father was a high school and collegiate referee who stated Brandon "was trained correctly, both mentally and physically. He grew up knowing the rules of the game". Ingram played all four years of his high school basketball career at Kinston High School and helped lead Kinston to four straight state championships during his time there.

== High school career ==
During his freshman year at Kinston, he came off the bench on the varsity basketball team but along the way his role grew. In his first year with the Kinston Vikings, the team defeated Cuthbertson High School by three points to win the 2012 NCHSAA 2A boys basketball state championship in Reynolds Coliseum. As a sophomore, Kinston defeated Cuthbertson for the second year in a row to win the 2A state title and Ingram averaged 12.4 points per game (ppg), 3.9 rebounds per game (rpg) and 1.5 assists per game (apg). Prior to the start of Ingram's junior year, he began to show improvement during the 2013 summer while playing AAU basketball. After shining for the Stackhouse Elite team, the 6-foot-7-inch (2.01 m) junior entered the year with high expectations and received a large amount of attention from college coaches who were lined up to recruit Ingram to a Division I school.

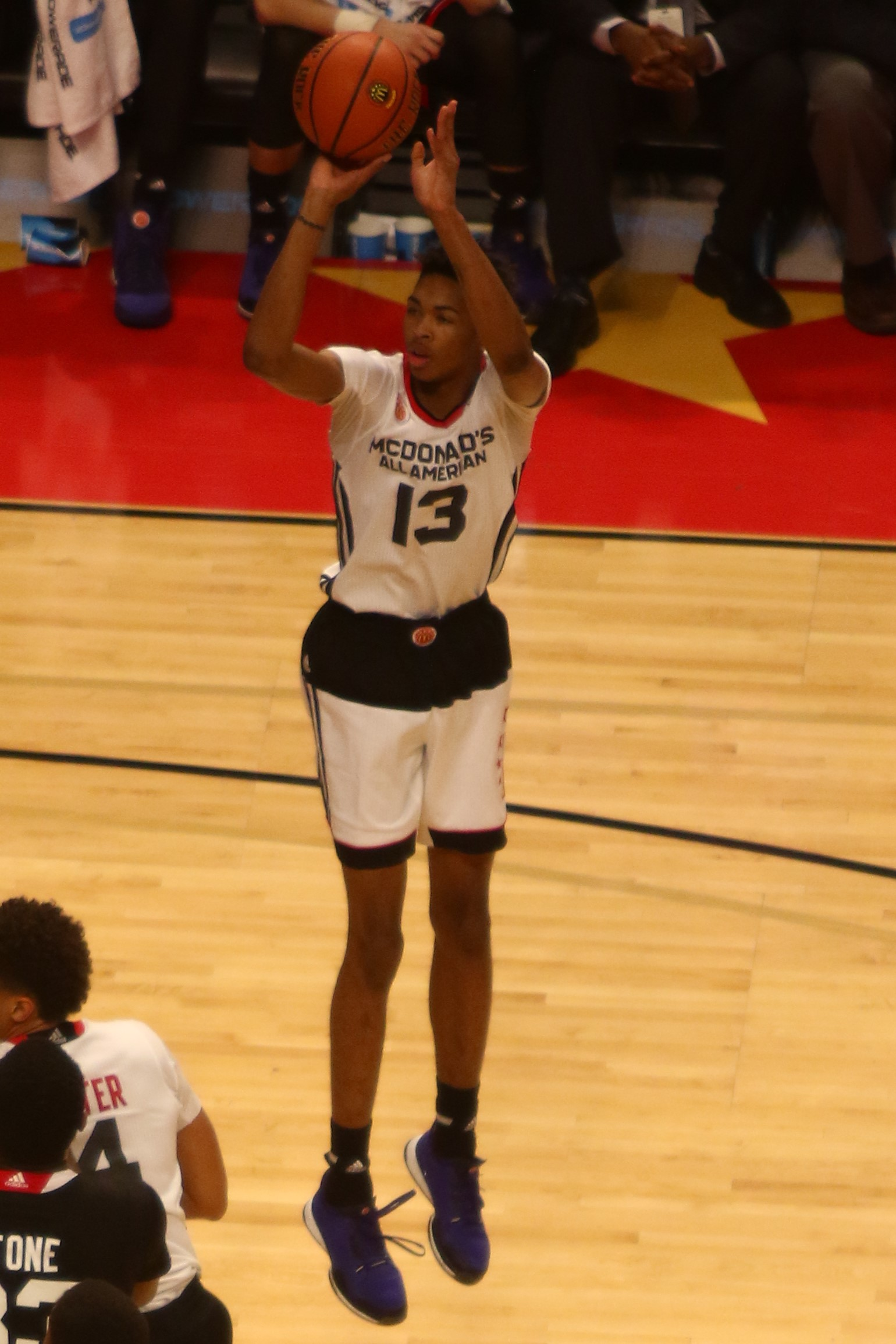
Ingram in the 2015 McDonald's All-American Game

In his junior year, Ingram led the Kinston Vikings to its third consecutive NCHSAA 2A state title, where he scored 28 points to go along with his 16 rebounds against North Rowan. During the season, the Vikings went undefeated in their conference with a 26–4 overall record while Ingram was averaging 19.5 points, 9.1 rebounds, 2.5 blocks and 1.5 assists per game and was named Eastern Regional Most Valuable Player (MVP). During the spring 2014, Ingram represented the Stackhouse Elite for the Norman Parker Showcase at the Suwanee Sports Academy where he earned MVP honors after leading the team to the championship. He averaged 17.9 points per game and 5.3 rebounds each contest and shot better than 81 percent from the free throw line during the Adidas Uprising circuit. After his junior year came to an end, Ingram participated in the NBPA Top 100 Camp on June 19, 2014, at John Paul Jones Arena in Charlottesville, Virginia. Later that summer, instead of playing for an AAU tournament in the Atlanta area, he decided to compete with his high school team at the annual East Coast Invitational (ECI), an off-season event in his home state.

As a senior, he averaged 24.3 points and 10.4 rebounds per game and led the Vikings to a 26–4 record. At the Spalding Hoophall Classic, Kinston pulled off a fourth-quarter comeback defeating Trenton Catholic Academy (56–54) behind Ingram's 22 points. In his final high school basketball game, he was named MVP of the state championship game after scoring 28 points to go with 10 rebounds and 5 blocks in a win over East Lincoln High School at the Dean E. Smith Center. This made Ingram the first men's basketball player to win 4 consecutive NCHSAA state championships. The Vikings also became the first 2A school in North Carolina history to win four consecutive state titles. Following his senior season, Ingram was a participant in the 2015 McDonald's All-American Game, where he scored 15 points and had five rebounds.

Ingram was rated as a five-star recruit and was considered among the best high school prospects of the 2015 class. He was ranked as the No. 3 overall recruit by ESPN and Scout, as well as No. 4 overall by Rivals. He was named North Carolina's Mr. Basketball and Player of the Year by North Carolina Basketball Coaches Association (NCBCA). He also made the Parade All-American team, in his senior season, joining Duke teammate Luke Kennard. In his senior year, he was also named to the North Carolina Basketball Coaches Association All-District First Team. On April 27, 2015, he announced that he would attend Duke University and play for the Blue Devils in the 2015–16 season. Ingram said he "probably" would have committed to North Carolina in November if the Tar Heels were not involved in a "far-reaching academic scandal".

College recruiting
Name	Hometown	School	Height	Weight	Commit date
Brandon Ingram; SF	Kinston, NC	Kinston HS	6 ft 8 in (2.03 m)	190 lb (86 kg)	Apr 27, 2015
Brandon Ingram; SF	Recruit ratings: Scout: Rivals: 247Sports: ESPN:				
Overall recruit ranking: Scout: 3, 1 (SF) Rivals: 4, 2 (SF) ESPN: 3, 1 (SF)
Note: In many cases, Scout, Rivals, 247Sports, On3, and ESPN may conflict in their listings of height and weight.; In these cases, the average was taken. ESPN grades are on a 100-point scale.; Sources: "Duke Basketball Commitment List". Rivals.; "2015 Duke Basketball Commits". Scout.; "ESPN". ESPN.; "Scout.com Team Recruiting Rankings". Scout.; "2015 Team Ranking". Rivals.

== College career ==
Ingram began his freshman year of college basketball playing two exhibition games against Florida Southern and Livingstone. In his debut for Duke, Ingram scored 15 points on 5-of-16 shooting against Siena. In the second game, he scored 21 points to help Duke defeat Bryant in the 2K Sports Classic. The Blue Devils started out the season ranked fifth in the nation entering the Champions Classic, an event that matches four of the nation's best programs against each other, before receiving their first loss of the season against Kentucky on November 17, 2015. The same day, Ingram became one of seven freshmen named to the 50-man Wooden Award preseason watchlist. Duke quickly bounced back by defeating Georgetown the following week at the 2K Sports Classic Championship in Madison Square Garden on November 22. The same week, Ingram came off the bench for the second time after being removed from Duke's starting line-up for their game against Yale, scoring 15 points. The following game, he was inserted back into the starting line-up and helped Duke start the season 9–1, which included a seven-game win streak, before falling to Utah in overtime. During a five-game stretch in December, Ingram averaged 21.2 points and 8.8 rebounds while filling in at power forward for injured Amile Jefferson. After recording 24 points and 6 rebounds in a win over Indiana in the ACC–Big Ten Challenge on December 2, Ingram scored 23 points to lead Duke over Buffalo. For his efforts, he received his first ACC Rookie of the Week honor.

On December 12, 2015, Ingram scored a career-high 26 points and grabbed 14 rebounds in a home win over Georgia Southern, and blocked a career-high 6 shots in a home win over Virginia Tech in January 2016. That same month, he scored 25 points and had 9 rebounds in a win at Boston College in his ACC debut. After being voted National Freshman of the Week and ACC Rookie of the Week twice in the month of January, Ingram helped Duke break a three-game losing streak by scoring 25 points to go with 7 rebounds against NC State. In February 2016, he was voted ACC Rookie of the Week for the fourth time after averaging a team-high 21.5 points and added 8.5 rebounds and 2.5 assists on the week as Duke defeated number thirteen Louisville and number seven Virginia to extend its winning streak to four games. That same month, Ingram was named to the 35-man midseason watchlist for the Naismith College Player of the Year award. In a road game against the number fifth seed and rival North Carolina, Ingram scored 20 points and grabbed 10 rebounds to give Duke a one-point win over the Tar Heels on February 17.

As the fifth seed in the ACC tournament, Duke beat NC State in the second round but lost to Notre Dame in the quarterfinals. In the 2016 NCAA tournament, Duke was awarded a fourth seed and won their first-round match-up against UNC Wilmington. After beating Yale in the second round, Duke was defeated in the Sweet 16 by Oregon despite 24 points from Ingram. In 36 games for Duke in 2015–16, Ingram averaged 17.3 points, 6.8 rebounds and 2.0 assists in 34.6 minutes per game, while shooting 44.2% from the field, 41.0% from three-point range and 68.2% from the free throw line. He finished the tournament averaging 23.0 points to go along with 6.3 rebounds and 2.7 assists in the three games. He subsequently earned ACC Rookie of the Year honors and AP All-American honorable mention. Ingram had one of the best seasons ever for a young player at Duke, ranking in the top 3 among the school's all-time freshman leaders in scoring (third), three-pointers (second) and 20-point games (tied for second). On April 4, 2016, Ingram declared for the 2016 NBA draft, forgoing his final three years of college eligibility.

== Professional career ==
=== Los Angeles Lakers (2016–2019) ===
On June 23, 2016, Ingram was selected with the second overall pick in the 2016 NBA draft by the Los Angeles Lakers. Being only 18 years old at the time, he was the second-youngest player drafted in 2016. On August 23, 2016, he signed his rookie-scale contract with the Lakers. He made his debut for the Lakers in their season opener on October 26, 2016, scoring nine points off the bench in a 120–114 win over the Houston Rockets. On November 23, in his first career start, Ingram scored a then-career-high 16 points in a 149–106 loss to the Golden State Warriors. He topped that mark on December 2, scoring 17 points in a 113–80 loss to the Toronto Raptors. On December 17, he had nine points, 10 rebounds and nine assists, finishing just an assist and a point shy of becoming the youngest player in NBA history to record a triple-double in Los Angeles' 119–108 loss to the Cleveland Cavaliers. On January 6, 2017, he had his second 17-point game of the season in a 127–100 win over the Miami Heat. Two days later, he had another 17-point effort in a 111–95 win over the Orlando Magic. During the NBA All-Star Weekend, he participated in the Rising Stars Challenge along with teammate D'Angelo Russell. He hit the 20-point mark for the first time in his career on February 26, scoring 22 points in a 119–98 loss to the San Antonio Spurs. At the season's end, he was named to the NBA All-Rookie Second Team.

During his only game in Summer League, Ingram scored 26 points in the first game and according to the Los Angeles Times, "had a fabulous debut this summer [...] and outclassed all the other players on the court." On October 20, 2017, he scored a then career-high 25 points in a 132–130 win over the Phoenix Suns. On November 15, 2017, he scored 26 points to go with a career-best 11 rebounds in a 115–109 loss to the Philadelphia 76ers. On November 29, he scored a career-high 32 points in a 127–123 overtime loss to the Golden State Warriors. On December 7, he scored 21 points, including the game-winning 3-pointer with 0.8 seconds remaining, leading the Lakers to a 107–104 victory over the 76ers to end a five-game losing streak. On January 5, 2018, he had 22 points and a career-high 14 rebounds in a 108–94 loss to the Charlotte Hornets. For the second year, he participated in the Rising Stars Challenge during NBA All-Star Weekend for Team USA. On March 1, Ingram suffered a groin strain that would cause him to miss 12 straight games. He returned on March 30 against the Milwaukee Bucks but suffered a neck muscle contusion during the game and was placed in the NBA's concussion protocol, causing him to miss the rest of the season.

Ingram received a four-game suspension early in the 2018–19 season for his involvement in an on-court fight against the Houston Rockets on October 20. He missed seven games in December with a sprained left ankle. On January 17, 2019, he had a career-high 11 assists in a 138–128 overtime win over the Oklahoma City Thunder. On January 29, he scored a career-high 36 points in a 121–105 loss to the Philadelphia 76ers. On March 9, Ingram was ruled out for the remainder of the season due to a deep vein thrombosis in his arm.

=== New Orleans Pelicans (2019–2025) ===
On July 6, 2019, the Lakers traded Ingram, Lonzo Ball, Josh Hart, the draft rights to De'Andre Hunter, two first-round picks, a first-round pick swap and cash to the New Orleans Pelicans for All-Star Anthony Davis. On November 4, 2019, Ingram recorded a then-career high by scoring 40 points in a loss against the Brooklyn Nets. On January 16, 2020, he bested that career high, scoring 49 points in a 138–132 overtime win over the Utah Jazz. Ingram gave New Orleans a one-point lead with a fadeaway jumper with 0.2 seconds remaining in regulation, before Rudy Gobert was fouled and sent the game to overtime with a free throw. He became an NBA All-Star in his first year as a Pelican. He was named the NBA Most Improved Player after averaging 23.8 points. 6.1 rebounds and 4.2 assists per game. After becoming a restricted free agent in the 2020 offseason, Ingram re-signed to the Pelicans on a five-year, $158 million contract. His contract has no player or team option, setting Ingram up to become a free agent again in the 2025 offseason.

On December 3, 2021, Ingram recorded a career-high 12 assists, along with 24 points and eight rebounds, in a 107–91 win over the Dallas Mavericks. Two days later, he scored a season-high 40 points in a 118–108 loss to the Houston Rockets. On January 11, 2022, Ingram recorded 33 points and nine assists, and hit a game-winning three-pointer to lift the Pelicans to a 128–125 victory over the Minnesota Timberwolves. On April 19, during Game 2 of the first round of the playoffs, Ingram recorded 37 points, 11 rebounds and 9 assists in a 125–114 win over the Phoenix Suns. In Game 4, on April 24, Ingram scored 30 points in a 118–103 win to tie the series at 2–2. New Orleans would go on to lose to Phoenix in six games despite Ingram averaging 27.0 points, 6.2 rebounds and 6.2 assists. On June 7, Ingram underwent surgery on his right pinky finger and was ruled out for 6 to 8 weeks.

On March 24, 2023, Ingram achieved the first triple-double of his NBA career with 30 points, 11 rebounds and 10 assists in the Pelicans' 115–96 victory over the Charlotte Hornets. On March 30, Ingram put up a triple-double with 31 points, 11 rebounds and 10 assists in a 107–88 win over the Denver Nuggets. He joined Chris Paul as the only players with multiple games of at least 30 points, 10 rebounds and 10 assists in Pelicans history. On April 9, in the final game of the 2022–23 season, Ingram posted season highs of 42 points and 12 rebounds along with 7 assists in a 113–108 loss against the Minnesota Timberwolves.

On February 6, 2024, Ingram put up 41 points, nine rebounds and six assists in a 138–100 win over the Toronto Raptors. He became the first player in NBA history to put up at least 40 points, eight or more three-pointers made, and shoot at least 75+% from the field, while not committing a turnover.

On December 8, 2024, Ingram sustained a left ankle sprain in a 119–109 loss to the Oklahoma City Thunder, which would go on to be his last game played for the Pelicans.

=== Toronto Raptors (2025–2026) ===
On February 6, 2025, Ingram was traded to the Toronto Raptors in exchange for guard-forward Bruce Brown, center Kelly Olynyk, a 2026 first-round draft pick (via Indiana) and a 2031 second-round draft pick. On February 12, he signed a 3-year, $120 million contract extension with the team. On April 9, before ever being able to suit up for the franchise, he was officially shut down for the season following a PRP injection in his ankle to aid in his recovery.

On November 13, 2025, Ingram was fined $25,000 by the NBA for an incident during a game against the Philadelphia 76ers. After being called for a foul, he was subbed out. He threw a water bottle to the floor, which accidentally hit a game attendant and Ingram was assessed for a technical foul.

On February 10, 2026, Ingram was named as an All-Star for the second time in his career, replacing the injured Stephen Curry.

During the second quarter of Game 5 on April 29, 2026, Ingram re-aggravated a right heel injury and was forced to exit the game after playing only 11 minutes. On May 8, 2026, Ingram underwent right heel surgery.

=== Los Angeles Clippers (2026–present) ===
On July 2, 2026, Toronto agreed to trade Ingram to the Los Angeles Clippers as part of a deal that would bring Kawhi Leonard back to the Raptors. However, due to the NBA's investigation into Leonard and the Clippers for salary cap circumvention, the trade could not be processed immediately. On September 14, 2026, Ingram was officially traded to the Clippers along with Gradey Dick, their 2031 and 2033 1st round picks, 2030 and 2033 2nd round picks, and a 2027 1st round pick swap to the Clippers in exchange for Leonard.

== National team career ==
Ingram was selected to the 2016 U.S. select team, which trained with the 2016 U.S. Olympic basketball team. He was also a member of the United States national team that competed in the 2023 FIBA Basketball World Cup, finishing fourth overall.

== Player profile ==
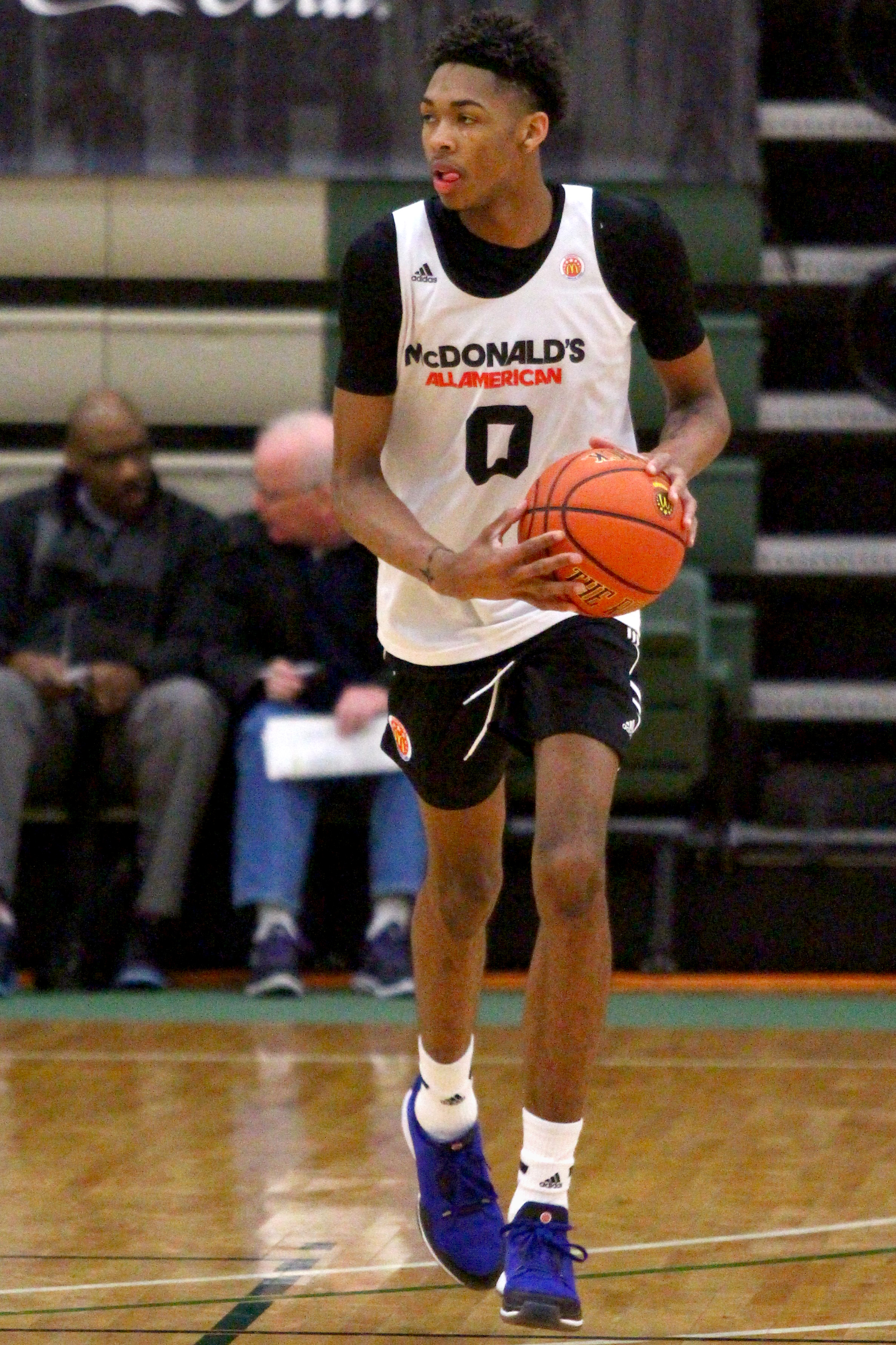
Ingram during a closed practice of the 2015 McDonald's All-American Game

Ingram is a 6 feet 8 inches (2.03 m), prototypical modern wing scorer with size and feel. Since joining the Raptors, he has consistently been one of the primary offensive options, averaging around 21-22 points per game while showing efficient scoring across multiple levels. His size and shooting touch allow him to shoot over defenders, hit jumpers, and create tough buckets in isolation or when the offense stalls. Ingram’s length and craft give him upside defensively, though that end remains an area of fluctuation. He adds secondary playmaking to the Raptors’ offense alongside Scottie Barnes and provides scoring gravity that helps open looks for others.

Over the years, Ingram has drawn frequent comparisons to Kevin Durant, after whom he patterned his playing style revealing, "I try to take bits and pieces out of [Durant's] game and put it in my game [but] at the end of the day, he's Kevin Durant, and I'm Brandon Ingram". After a Team USA practice, Durant told reporters that Ingram is "the first person that I could... look at him and feel like I'm looking in the mirror".

== Personal life ==
Growing up, one of Ingram's favorite things to do as a kid was fishing with his grandmother at Atlantic Beach. Ingram signed with Excel Sports Management and is represented by Excel founder and president Jeff Schwartz. In 2016, he chose to sign an endorsement deal with Adidas Basketball and made an appearance in a commercial for Speed Stick along with then Minnesota Timberwolves point guard Kris Dunn. In early 2017, he teamed up with L.A. street artist Jonas Never for Delta's "Beyond the Court" campaign, which saw Ingram and then-Laker teammate Jordan Clarkson explore their passions outside of basketball. While Clarkson is an aspiring fashion designer, Ingram's passion for art began with him drawing basketball players and cartoon characters, which was bolstered by taking a portrait drawing class at Duke. As of January 2026, Ingram is currently in a relationship with rapper Glorilla.

== Career statistics ==
Legend
GP	Games played	GS	Games started	MPG	Minutes per game
FG%	Field goal percentage	3P%	3-point field goal percentage	FT%	Free throw percentage
RPG	Rebounds per game	APG	Assists per game	SPG	Steals per game
BPG	Blocks per game	PPG	Points per game	**Bold**	Career high

=== NBA ===
==== Regular season ====
Year	Team	GP	GS	MPG	FG%	3P%	FT%	RPG	APG	SPG	BPG	PPG
2016–17	L.A. Lakers	**79**	40	28.9	.402	.294	.621	4.0	2.1	.6	.4	9.4
2017–18	L.A. Lakers	59	59	33.5	.470	.390	.681	5.3	3.9	.8	**.7**	16.1
2018–19	L.A. Lakers	52	52	33.9	**.497**	.330	.675	5.1	3.0	.5	.6	18.3
2019–20	New Orleans	62	62	33.9	.463	**.391**	.851	**6.1**	4.2	**1.0**	.6	23.8
2020–21	New Orleans	61	61	**34.3**	.466	.381	.878	4.9	4.9	.7	.6	23.8
2021–22	New Orleans	55	55	34.0	.461	.327	.826	5.8	5.6	.6	.5	22.7
2022–23	New Orleans	45	45	34.2	.484	.390	**.882**	5.5	**5.8**	.7	.4	**24.7**
2023–24	New Orleans	64	64	32.9	.492	.355	.801	5.1	5.7	.8	.6	20.8
2024–25	New Orleans	18	18	33.1	.465	.374	.855	5.6	5.2	.9	.6	22.2
2025–26	Toronto	77	**77**	33.8	.477	.382	.820	5.6	3.7	.8	**.7**	21.5
Career		572	533	33.1	.469	.366	.792	5.2	4.2	.7	.6	19.8
All-Star		2	0	8.9	.143	.000	—	2.0	1.0	.5	.0	1.0

==== Playoffs ====
Year	Team	GP	GS	MPG	FG%	3P%	FT%	RPG	APG	SPG	BPG	PPG
2022	New Orleans	**6**	**6**	**39.3**	**.475**	**.407**	.830	**6.2**	**6.2**	.7	.3	**27.0**
2024	New Orleans	4	4	36.4	.345	.250	**.895**	4.5	3.3	**1.0**	**1.3**	14.3
2026	Toronto	5	5	29.6	.328	.385	.739	3.2	2.2	.6	.8	12.0
Career		15	15	35.3	.407	.375	.820	4.7	4.1	.7	.7	18.6

=== College ===
Year	Team	GP	GS	MPG	FG%	3P%	FT%	RPG	APG	SPG	BPG	PPG
2015–16	Duke	36	34	34.6	.442	.410	.682	6.8	2.0	1.1	1.4	17.3

== Awards and honors ==
NBA

- NBA All-Star (2020, 2026)
- NBA Most Improved Player (2020)
- 2× Rising Stars Challenge (2017, 2018)
- NBA All-Rookie Second Team (2017)

College

- Associated Press Honorable Mention (2016)
- ACC Rookie of the Year (2016)

High school

- 4× NCHSAA champion (2012, 2013, 2014, 2015)
- North Carolina Mr. Basketball (2015)
- McDonald's All-American (2015)
- First-team Parade All-American (2015)
- Nike Hoop Summit (2015)
