= Tobi Lawal =

English basketball player (born 2003)

No. 33 – Dallas Mavericks
- Position: Power forward
- League: NBA

Personal information
- Born: 1 May 2003 (age 23) London, England
- Listed height: 6 ft 7 in (2.01 m)
- Listed weight: 215 lb (98 kg)

Career information
- High school: Lee Academy (Lee, Maine)
- College: VCU (2022–2024); Virginia Tech (2024–2026)
- NBA draft: 2026: 2nd round, 48th overall pick
- Drafted by: Dallas Mavericks
- Playing career: 2026–present

Career history
- 2026–present: Dallas Mavericks
- 2026–present: →Texas Legends
- Stats at NBA.com
- Stats at Basketball Reference

Toibu Lawal (born 1 May 2003) is a British professional basketball player for the Dallas Mavericks of the National Basketball Association (NBA), on a two-way contract with the Texas Legends of the NBA G League. He played college basketball for the VCU Rams and Virginia Tech Hokies.

== Early life and high school ==
Lawal started playing basketball at the age of 16. He attended the City of London Academy basketball programme before heading to the Lee Academy in Lee, Maine, for a prep year. Lawal averaged 14.5 points, 11.4 rebounds and 3.0 blocks per game. Coming out of high school, he committed to play college basketball for the VCU Rams.

== College career ==
As a freshman during the 2022-23 season, Lawal played sparingly, averaging 1.3 points per game. In the 2023-24 season, he averaged 7.7 points and 6.0 rebounds in 38 games played. After the season, Lawal entered the NCAA transfer portal.

Lawal transferred to play for the Virginia Tech Hokies. In 2024-25, he made 30 starts, averaging 12.4 points and 7.0 rebounds per game. On November 16, 2025, Lawal racked up 18 points and 15 rebounds in a victory versus Charlotte. He played 23 games with 17 starts, averaging 12.3 points, 8.5 rebounds, and 1.1 blocks per game, while shooting 54% from the field. After the season, Lawal declared for the 2026 NBA draft, accepting an invite to the NBA scouting combine.

== Professional career ==
On June 24, 2026, Lawal was selected by the Dallas Mavericks with the 48th overall pick in the 2026 NBA draft. On July 3, 2026, he signed a standard two-way contract with the Mavericks. That same day, Lawal was announced to be participating with the Mavericks in the 2026 NBA Summer League, where he appeared in all five games, during those games, he averaged 5.8 points, 3.8 rebounds, and 0.8 assists.
