= Trent Redden =

American basketball executive (born 1983)

Los Angeles Clippers
- Position: President of basketball operations (interim)
- League: NBA

Personal information
- Born: October 26, 1983 (age 43) Sacramento, California, U.S.
- Listed height: 6 ft 3 in (1.91 m)
- Listed weight: 175 lb (79 kg)

Career information
- High school: Sheldon (Vineyard, California)
- College: SMU (2003–2004)
- NBA draft: 2006: undrafted

Career highlights
- As assistant general manager: NBA champion (2016)

Trent Redden (born October 26, 1983) is an American basketball executive who is currently the interim president of basketball operations for the Los Angeles Clippers of the National Basketball Association (NBA).

== Early life and playing career ==
Redden was born on October 26, 1983, in Portland, Oregon, and attended Sheldon High School. He played college basketball at SMU, appearing in three total career games during the 2003–04 season. Redden graduated in 2006.

== Executive career ==
Redden started his career with the Cleveland Cavaliers in July 2006 as an intern for the basketball operations department and was hired as an assistant for it immediately following the 2006–07 season; after four years, he was promoted as the manager/scout for the department in August 2010. He would only serve a year in that role before he was named the team's director of college player personnel in December 2011. became the team's assistant general manager in September 2013. Despite winning the NBA Finals with the Cavaliers in 2016, his contract with the team was not renewed when it expired in June 2017, coinciding with team owner Dan Gilbert's decision to part ways with general manager David Griffin. Redden would not remain unemployed for long as he was hired as the assistant general manager for the Los Angeles Clippers two months later. He would remain in that role until he was promoted to be the team's general manager in June 2023 upon Michael Winger's departure to the Washington Wizards. Redden was named the interim president of basketball operations for the Clippers in September 2026 after Lawrence Frank was suspended for six months for his role in the team's salary cap scandal.

Sporting positions
Preceded by Lawrence Frank	Los Angeles Clippers General Manager; 2023–2026	Succeeded by Mark Hughes
