= Gillian Zucker =

American sports executive

Los Angeles Clippers
- Position: President of business operations
- League: NBA

Personal information
- Born: April 21, 1969 (age 57)

Career information
- College: Hamilton College

Gillian Zucker (born April 21, 1969) is an American sports executive, currently serving as the president of business operations of the Los Angeles Clippers of the National Basketball Association. Prior to her hiring by the Clippers, Zucker worked for nine years (2005 to 2014) as the president of the Auto Club Speedway, a NASCAR-sanctioned race track in Fontana, California, approximately 55 miles east of Los Angeles.

== Career ==
=== Early career ===
Prior to working in NASCAR, Zucker worked as the assistant general manager of the Durham Bulls baseball team, the Triple-A farm team of the Tampa Bay Rays. She also worked for other minor league baseball teams in various capacities, including for the following teams: High Desert Mavericks, Springfield Sultans, and Lansing Lugnuts.

Zucker joined the International Speedway Corporation in 1998 as the Director of Business Development for Kansas Speedway during the track's construction in the late 1990's before it opened in 2001. She then worked as the Vice President of Business Operations and Development at the Daytona International Speedway before becoming the track president of Auto Club Speedway in 2005.

=== Auto Club Speedway ===
While at the Auto Club Speedway, Zucker and her team initiated aggressive marketing towards children and minority groups to boost tickets and merchandising sales at the race track. Because of that, she was honored by Fox Sports and MSN as one of the most of powerful women in motorsports. Also while with the Auto Club Speedway, she worked on the management team of parent company International Speedway Corporation, also overseeing operations at their race tracks in Joliet, Illinois (Chicagoland Speedway) and Kansas City, Kansas (Kansas Speedway). However, attendance at Auto Club Speedway gradually declined (as it was also reflective at most NASCAR tracks as a whole), and as a result, the Auto Club Speedway lost a Sprint Cup race (Pepsi Max 400), and they had to decrease its seating capacity from 92,000 to 68,000.

=== Los Angeles Clippers ===
When she was hired by the Clippers on November 6, 2014, Zucker effectively replaced long-time team executive Andy Roeser, who not only ran the business side of the team, but also played a role in basketball operations, particularly handling player contract negotiations on behalf of Sterling and the team. Zucker’s role with the Clippers is more defined, as she handles the team’s business dealings, ticketing, marketing, and sponsorships. The hiring of Zucker was the first major hire under the ownership of Clippers' current team owner, Steve Ballmer, and she was among approximately thirty candidates that interviewed for the position of president of business operations. Under her new presidency, Zucker was called-on by Ballmer to oversee the new identity package created for the team, which was officially introduced to the public on June 17, 2015. Zucker, Ballmer, head coach and president of basketball operations Doc Rivers, and the team’s long-time play-by-play announcer Ralph Lawler were among those affiliated with the team that gave out free merchandise with the new insignia to fans throughout greater Los Angeles.

On September 2, 2026, Zucker was suspended without pay for one year following an NBA investigation into salary cap circumvention involving player Kawhi Leonard and bankrupt sponsor Aspiration, Inc. According to the NBA, Zucker was suspended for directly arranging prohibited endorsement deals and for lying to league investigators.

== Personal life ==
Zucker is a 1990 graduate of Hamilton College in Clinton, Oneida County, New York, receiving a bachelor of arts degree while majoring in creative writing and religious studies, and currently resides in the Brentwood section of Los Angeles. She is a board member for the Los Angeles Sports Council, California Chamber, Los Angeles Sports and Entertainment Commission, Young Presidents Organization, and California Travel and Tourism Commission. Zucker is also a commissioner for the board that oversees the Los Angeles Convention Center, as she was appointed by Eric Garcetti, the mayor of Los Angeles.

== See also ==
- List of National Basketball Association team presidents
- List of people banned or suspended by the NBA
