= 2026–27 NBA season =

81st NBA season

- League: National Basketball Association
- Sport: Basketball
- Duration: October 20, 2026 – April 11, 2027; October 30 – December 11, 2026 (NBA Cup); April 13–16, 2027 (Play-in tournament); April 17, 2027–May 2027 (Playoffs); June 2027 (Finals)
- Games: 82
- Teams: 30
- TV partner(s): ESPN/ABC, NBC/NBCSN, NBA TV
- Streaming partner(s): ESPN app/Disney+, Peacock, Amazon Prime Video

Draft
- Top draft pick: AJ Dybantsa
- Picked by: Washington Wizards

Regular season

NBA Cup

Playoffs

Finals

NBA seasons
- ← 2025–26 2027–28 →

The 2026–27 NBA season is the 81st season of the National Basketball Association (NBA). The regular season began on October 20, 2026 and will end on April 11, 2027. The fourth edition of the in-season NBA Cup tournament is planned to run from October 30 to December 11, 2026. The 2027 NBA All-Star Game is scheduled for February 21, 2027, at the Mortgage Matchup Center in Phoenix, Arizona. The play-in tournament is then planned for April 13–16, following with the playoffs that will begin on April 17, and ending with the NBA Finals in June.

== Transactions ==
=== Retirements ===
- On July 4, 2026, Garrett Temple was hired as an assistant coach for the Dallas Mavericks. He played for 12 teams over a 17-year career.
- On July 7, 2026, Kyle Lowry announced his retirement from professional basketball. He played 20 seasons with the NBA, and was an NBA champion with the Toronto Raptors in 2019. Lowry was the last active player from the 2006 NBA draft.
- On August 12, 2026, Russell Westbrook announced his retirement from professional basketball. He played 18 seasons with the NBA, appeared in the NBA Finals with the Oklahoma City Thunder in 2012, and won the NBA Most Valuable Player award in 2017.

=== Draft ===
The 2026 NBA draft took place on June 23–24 at Barclays Center in Brooklyn, New York.

=== Free agency ===
Free agency negotiations began on June 30 at 6 p.m. ET. Players may be signed after the July moratorium on July 6 at 12:00 p.m. ET.

=== Coaching changes ===
Coaching changes
Team	2025–26 season	2026–27 season
Off-season
Chicago Bulls	Billy Donovan	Tiago Splitter
Dallas Mavericks	Jason Kidd	Dusty May
Milwaukee Bucks	Doc Rivers	Taylor Jenkins
New Orleans Pelicans	James Borrego (interim)	Jamahl Mosley
Orlando Magic	Jamahl Mosley	Sean Sweeney
Portland Trail Blazers	Tiago Splitter (interim)	Micah Nori

==== Off-season ====
- On April 13, 2026, Doc Rivers resigned from his position as head coach of the Milwaukee Bucks.
- On April 21, 2026, Billy Donovan stepped down as the Chicago Bulls' head coach.
- On April 30, 2026, the Milwaukee Bucks hired Taylor Jenkins as their new head coach.
- On May 4, 2026, the Orlando Magic fired head coach Jamahl Mosley after five seasons with the team.
- On May 18, 2026, the New Orleans Pelicans hired Jamahl Mosley as their new head coach.
- On May 19, 2026, the Dallas Mavericks and head coach Jason Kidd mutually agreed to part ways.
- On June 1, 2026, the Orlando Magic hired Sean Sweeney as their new head coach.
- On June 16, 2026, the Chicago Bulls hired Tiago Splitter as their new head coach.
- On June 23, 2026, the Portland Trail Blazers hired Micah Nori as their new head coach.
- On June 23, 2026, the Dallas Mavericks hired Dusty May as their new head coach.

== Preseason ==
In addition to regular preseason games hosted at NBA teams' own arenas, the NBA often hosts neutral site preseason games (either in domestic non-NBA markets or foreign markets) or against non-NBA teams. Listed below are only those neutral site or preseason games.

=== Domestic neutral site games ===
Date	Teams	Arena	Location	Reference
October 3	Miami Heat vs. Toronto Raptors	Centre Vidéotron	Quebec City, Quebec	
October 4	Utah Jazz vs. Denver Nuggets	CU Events Center	Boulder, Colorado	
October 4	Golden State Warriors vs. Los Angeles Clippers	Stan Sheriff Center	Honolulu, Hawaii	
October 6	New Orleans Pelicans vs. Oklahoma City Thunder	BOK Center	Tulsa, Oklahoma	
October 7	Minnesota Timberwolves vs. Indiana Pacers	Hilton Coliseum	Ames, Iowa	
October 10	Los Angeles Clippers vs. Toronto Raptors	Rogers Arena	Vancouver, British Columbia	
October 13	Golden State Warriors vs. Los Angeles Lakers	T-Mobile Arena	Paradise, Nevada	

=== International games ===
Date	Teams	Arena	Location	Reference
October 9	Houston Rockets vs. Dallas Mavericks	Venetian Arena	Macau, China	
October 11	Dallas Mavericks vs. Houston Rockets	Venetian Arena	Macau, China	

=== Non-NBA opponents ===
Date	Teams	Arena	Location	Reference
October 12	London Lions @ Portland Trail Blazers	Moda Center	Portland, Oregon	

== Regular season ==
The NBA released the regular-season schedule on August 13, with select games announced in advance of the full schedule release.

=== International games ===
The NBA plans to hold regular-season games in 2027 at Accor Arena in Paris, France on January 14 and at Co-op Live in Manchester, United Kingdom on January 17 between the San Antonio Spurs and New Orleans Pelicans.

Date	Teams	Arena	Location	Reference	Winner
NBA Mexico City Game 2026
November 7	Denver Nuggets vs. Indiana Pacers	Mexico City Arena	Mexico City, Mexico		Denver Nuggets
NBA Paris Game 2027
January 14	New Orleans Pelicans vs. San Antonio Spurs	Accor Arena	Paris, France		TBD
NBA Manchester Game 2027
January 17	San Antonio Spurs vs. New Orleans Pelicans	Co-op Live	Manchester, United Kingdom		TBD

=== NBA Cup ===
The NBA Cup is expected to have the same basic structure as previous seasons:

- All games except the championship final count towards the regular-season standings.
- Six intraconference pools of five (three pools per conference).
- Group games against each of the other teams in their pool (two at home and two on the road) will be held on Fridays and other select days in November.
- The winners of each pool (three teams per conference) and two wild-card teams (one team per conference) advance to a single-elimination tournament in early December.
- To compensate, only 80 regular-season games for each team is initially announced during the offseason. The first two rounds of the tournament count as regular-season games 81 and 82. The championship game is an extra 83rd game that does not count toward the regular season. Teams that do not qualify for knockout round or is eliminated in the quarterfinals will be scheduled additional games against other teams eliminated in the same conference (if possible) and round to reach 82 games.
- The semifinals will move to the home arenas of the higher-seeded teams in each conference.
- The championship game for this edition will be held at Hinkle Fieldhouse in Indianapolis, Indiana as part of a new vision to host the game at more distinct and iconic basketball arenas. It will replace T-Mobile Arena in Paradise, Nevada, which hosted the championship game during the first three editions of the Cup.

=== Standings ===
Eastern Conference

Atlantic Division	W	L	PCT	GB	Home	Road	Div	GP
Philadelphia 76ers	13	3	.813	–	6‍–‍2	7‍–‍1	4–1	16
Boston Celtics	11	4	.733	1.5	6‍–‍1	5‍–‍3	4–0	15
New York Knicks	9	6	.600	3.5	4‍–‍3	5‍–‍3	3–3	15
Toronto Raptors	6	10	.375	7.0	2‍–‍6	4‍–‍4	0–4	16
Brooklyn Nets	3	12	.200	9.5	1‍–‍6	2‍–‍6	0–3	15

Central Division	W	L	PCT	GB	Home	Road	Div	GP
Detroit Pistons	10	5	.667	–	3‍–‍3	7‍–‍2	0–0	15
Cleveland Cavaliers	9	8	.529	2.0	7‍–‍3	2‍–‍5	3–0	17
Indiana Pacers	5	11	.313	5.5	2‍–‍6	3‍–‍5	0–2	16
Chicago Bulls	4	11	.267	6.0	1‍–‍5	3‍–‍6	1–1	15
Milwaukee Bucks	1	15	.063	9.5	1‍–‍8	0‍–‍7	1–2	16

Southeast Division	W	L	PCT	GB	Home	Road	Div	GP
Atlanta Hawks	10	6	.625	–	4‍–‍3	6‍–‍3	5–1	16
Miami Heat	9	6	.600	0.5	5‍–‍3	4‍–‍3	1–1	15
Orlando Magic	7	8	.467	2.5	1‍–‍5	6‍–‍3	0–2	15
Washington Wizards	6	11	.353	4.5	2‍–‍5	4‍–‍6	2–3	17
Charlotte Hornets	4	11	.267	5.5	3‍–‍4	1‍–‍7	2–3	15

Western Conference

Northwest Division	W	L	PCT	GB	Home	Road	Div	GP
Minnesota Timberwolves	11	5	.688	–	7‍–‍3	4‍–‍2	3–0	16
Portland Trail Blazers	10	5	.667	0.5	3‍–‍2	7‍–‍3	4–2	15
Denver Nuggets	9	5	.643	1.0	4‍–‍3	5‍–‍2	0–2	14
Oklahoma City Thunder	10	6	.625	1.0	6‍–‍1	4‍–‍5	1–2	16
Utah Jazz	3	14	.176	8.5	1‍–‍8	2‍–‍6	0–2	17

Pacific Division	W	L	PCT	GB	Home	Road	Div	GP
Los Angeles Lakers	14	3	.824	–	7‍–‍2	7‍–‍1	6–1	17
Phoenix Suns	8	7	.533	5.0	5‍–‍4	3‍–‍3	3–2	15
Golden State Warriors	8	8	.500	5.5	6‍–‍1	2‍–‍7	3–2	16
Los Angeles Clippers	4	10	.286	8.5	4‍–‍4	0‍–‍6	1–4	14
Sacramento Kings	1	14	.067	12.0	0‍–‍9	1‍–‍5	0–4	15

Southwest Division	W	L	PCT	GB	Home	Road	Div	GP
San Antonio Spurs	13	3	.813	–	6‍–‍3	7‍–‍0	2–1	16
Memphis Grizzlies	12	4	.750	1.0	4‍–‍4	8‍–‍0	1–1	16
Houston Rockets	12	5	.706	1.5	7‍–‍1	5‍–‍4	2–1	17
Dallas Mavericks	8	7	.533	4.5	6‍–‍2	2‍–‍5	1–3	15
New Orleans Pelicans	5	12	.294	8.5	4‍–‍7	1‍–‍5	1–1	17

==== By conference ====
Eastern Conference
#	Team	W	L	PCT	GB	GP
1	Philadelphia 76ers *	13	3	.813	–	16
2	Boston Celtics	11	4	.733	1.5	15
3	Detroit Pistons *	10	5	.667	2.5	15
4	Atlanta Hawks *	10	6	.625	3.0	16
5	Miami Heat	9	6	.600	3.5	15
6	New York Knicks	9	6	.600	3.5	15
7	Cleveland Cavaliers	9	8	.529	4.5	17
8	Orlando Magic	7	8	.467	5.5	15
9	Toronto Raptors	6	10	.375	7.0	16
10	Washington Wizards	6	11	.353	7.5	17
11	Indiana Pacers	5	11	.313	8.0	16
12	Charlotte Hornets	4	11	.267	8.5	15
13	Chicago Bulls	4	11	.267	8.5	15
14	Brooklyn Nets	3	12	.200	9.5	15
15	Milwaukee Bucks	1	15	.063	12.0	16

Western Conference
#	Team	W	L	PCT	GB	GP
1	Los Angeles Lakers *	14	3	.824	–	17
2	San Antonio Spurs *	13	3	.813	0.5	16
3	Memphis Grizzlies	12	4	.750	1.5	16
4	Houston Rockets	12	5	.706	2.0	17
5	Minnesota Timberwolves *	11	5	.688	2.5	16
6	Portland Trail Blazers	10	5	.667	3.0	15
7	Denver Nuggets	9	5	.643	3.5	14
8	Oklahoma City Thunder	10	6	.625	3.5	16
9	Phoenix Suns	8	7	.533	5.0	15
10	Dallas Mavericks	8	7	.533	5.0	15
11	Golden State Warriors	8	8	.500	5.5	16
12	New Orleans Pelicans	5	12	.294	9.0	17
13	Los Angeles Clippers	4	10	.286	8.5	14
14	Utah Jazz	3	14	.176	11.0	17
15	Sacramento Kings	1	14	.067	12.0	15

Notes

- * – Division leader

== Statistics ==
Statistics accurate as of November 21, 2026.

=== Individual statistic leaders ===
Category	Player	Team(s)	Statistic
Points per game	Luka Dončić	Los Angeles Lakers	37.2
Rebounds per game	Karl-Anthony Towns	New York Knicks	13.9
Assists per game	Nikola Jokić	Denver Nuggets	9.1
Steals per game	Dyson Daniels	Atlanta Hawks	2.9
Blocks per game	Victor Wembanyama	San Antonio Spurs	3.9
Turnovers per game	Luka Dončić	Los Angeles Lakers	5.1
Fouls per game	LaMelo Ball	Minnesota Timberwolves	3.7
Minutes per game	Nikola Jokić	Denver Nuggets	36.8
FG%	Walker Kessler	Los Angeles Lakers	66.4%
FT%	Stephen Curry	Golden State Warriors	98.7%
3P%	Moritz Wagner	Brooklyn Nets	62.1%
Efficiency per game	Victor Wembanyama	San Antonio Spurs	37.4
Double-doubles	Karl-Anthony Towns	New York Knicks	15
Triple-doubles	Nikola Jokić	Denver Nuggets	3

=== Individual game highs ===
Category	Player	Team	Statistic
Points	Luka Dončić	Los Angeles Lakers	53
Rebounds	Victor Wembanyama	San Antonio Spurs	24
Assists	Davion Mitchell	Miami Heat	17
Steals	Dyson Daniels	Atlanta Hawks	7
Steals	Kris Dunn	Los Angeles Clippers	7
Blocks	Victor Wembanyama (2x)	San Antonio Spurs	8
Three-pointers	Quentin Grimes	Los Angeles Lakers	10

=== Team statistic leaders ===
Category	Team	Statistic
Points per game	Memphis Grizzlies	120.5
Rebounds per game	San Antonio Spurs	47.8
Assists per game	Atlanta Hawks	30.8
Steals per game	Los Angeles Lakers	10.6
Blocks per game	San Antonio Spurs	6.8
Turnovers per game	Charlotte Hornets	19.2
Fouls per game	Brooklyn Nets	25.5
FG%	Los Angeles Lakers	48.9%
FT%	Memphis Grizzlies	84.5%
3P%	Memphis Grizzlies	39.1%
+/−	San Antonio Spurs	11.9

== Awards ==
=== Players of the Week ===
The following players were named the Eastern and Western Conference Players of the Week.

Week	Eastern Conference	Western Conference	Ref
October 20–25	Tyrese Maxey (Philadelphia 76ers) (1/1)	Ty Jerome (Memphis Grizzlies) (1/1)	
October 26 – November 1	Jayson Tatum (Boston Celtics) (1/1)	Victor Wembanyama (San Antonio Spurs) (1/2)	
November 2–8	Jalen Brunson (New York Knicks) (1/1)	Luka Dončić (Los Angeles Lakers) (1/1)	
November 9–15	Giannis Antetokounmpo (Miami Heat) (1/1)	Victor Wembanyama (San Antonio Spurs) (2/2)	

== Uniform and logo changes ==
- The Houston Rockets unveiled new uniforms resembling the "ketchup and mustard" look that was used during their back-to-back championships in 1994 and 1995. The "R" logo remains as the team's primary mark, but with an added yellow accent to reflect its reintroduction into the Rockets' color scheme.
- The Minnesota Timberwolves unveiled a new logo and uniforms. The new logo resembles their previous mark introduced in 2017, but using a color scheme similar to the one used from the franchise's inception in 1989 until 1996. The Icon and Association uniforms also resemble the original look of the Timberwolves while the Statement uniform resembles their black uniforms from the Kevin Garnett era.

== Media ==
=== Television ===
==== National ====
This is the second season of 11-year deals with the ESPN family of networks, NBC Sports and Amazon Prime Video.

===== Linear television =====
- ESPN continues to primarily carry Wednesday night regular-season games and the NBA All-Star Celebrity Game, along with producing NBA Saturday Primetime and NBA Sunday Showcase on ABC, the slate of five ESPN/ABC simulcasts on Christmas Day, and the primetime doubleheader on the final night of the regular season. Games only on ESPN will continue to be non-exclusive and co-exist with the teams' regional broadcasts.
  - ESPN's schedule also includes a Thursday doubleheader on opening week, an NBA Cup group stage tripleheader on November 25, select Friday night games between January and March, a Saturday West Coast game on March 13, and a Sunday afternoon doubleheader on Easter Sunday March 28.
  - This season's NBA Saturday Primetime on ABC is scheduled for seven select weeks between December and March, including a quadruple header on January 30. This season's NBA Sunday Showcase will only be doubleheaders on three consecutive weekends in late February and March. This is partly due to ABC carrying Super Bowl LXI in mid-February, airing the NFL's championship game for the first time since 2006, among other commitments. ABC will also air a Sunday doubleheader on the day of the Academy Awards for the first time since 2007, with special 12 and 2:30 p.m. ET time slots leading into the 99th Academy Awards.
  - On the final day of the regular season, April 11, two games with playoff implications will be flexed into an ESPN primetime doubleheader.
- NBC continues to have opening night games, Coast 2 Coast Tuesday doubleheaders, late-season Sunday Night Basketball, Martin Luther King Jr. Day games, and the NBA All-Star Game. In comparison to the prior season, the NBC broadcast network will air 11 more games.
  - This season's opening night NBA Tip-Off expanded to a tripleheader for the first time. Like the previous season, the Coast 2 Coast Tuesday doubleheader format will then air during most weeks of the regular season, with NBC affiliates having the option to show the 8 p.m. ET/5 p.m. PT game, the 11 p.m. ET/8 p.m. PT contest, or both Tuesday games at their discretion.
  - NBC formalized the late-December national doubleheaders it aired in 2025 as Holiday Hoops, which will air on December 22, 28 and 29, with 8 and 10:30 p.m. ET windows replacing Coast 2 Coast Tuesdays where applicable.
  - Sunday Night Basketball expands to 16 games, adding two weeks of standalone games in January that will air against the NFL playoffs. The remaining schedule between February and April will all be doubleheaders.
  - Daytime tripleheaders are scheduled on NBC this season on both Martin Luther King Jr. Day and Presidents' Day.
  - NBCSN will serve as an overflow channel for NBC, as well as simulcasting Peacock's Monday and other telecasts. Telemundo has Spanish-language broadcasts of 10 Sunday Night Basketball games and the All-Star Game.
- NBA TV will continue to televise select games throughout the regular season when the other broadcasters are not airing games, simulcast from regional broadcasters. NBA TV's schedule this season includes the Mexico City Global Game.

===== Streaming =====
- Amazon Prime Video continues to have Friday night doubleheaders throughout most of the regular season (including most NBA Cup group stage nights, one of those is a doubleheader to lead out its Black Friday Football game on November 27), late-season Thursday night games, and late-season Saturday afternoon games, as well as the entire knockout round of the NBA Cup and both European Global games. As Christmas Day lands on a Friday in 2026, Prime Video will instead have its doubleheader for that week on Wednesday, December 23. Prime Video's Thursday schedule this season begins with a New Year's Eve afternoon game as a lead in to the Thursday Night Football finale. Thursday night doubleheaders are then primarily scheduled between January and April, with the January 14 Paris Global game instead serving as an afternoon singleheader. Saturday afternoon games (mostly doubleheaders) then run on select weeks in February and March.
- The ESPN app's Unlimited plan will stream all ESPN-produced games. The ESPN app's lower Select plan or Disney+ may also stream select games.
- Peacock will simulcast all games aired by the NBC broadcast network, including both Coast 2 Coast Tuesday games nationwide. Peacock will also have Monday night games throughout most of the regular season (with one to two games per week, except December 28 which airs on the NBC broadcast network), including night games on both Martin Luther King Jr. Day and Presidents' Day.
- The league-owned NBA League Pass will continue to offer out-of-market games, and live access to NBA TV.

===== Postseason =====
Amazon Prime Video will stream all play-in tournament games. The first two playoff rounds will then be split between Amazon Prime Video, ESPN/ABC and NBC/Peacock. Amazon Prime Video will have between nine and 17 first-round games, and between five and nine second-round games. ESPN and ABC will air approximately 18 games in the first two rounds. NBC and/or Peacock will air between 15 and 23 first-round games, and between seven and 11 second-round games, with at least half of all of them airing on NBC.

Per a rotation, ESPN/ABC will air a conference final, with this season being the Western Conference Finals, and Amazon Prime Video will exclusively stream the Eastern Conference Finals this season. ABC will exclusively air the NBA Finals for its 25th consecutive season.

==== Local ====
The NBA has reportedly explored the possibility of building a "streaming hub" to centralize in-market digital rights in partnership with individual teams, either in lieu of or in partnership with their regional television broadcasters. The exact structure of the proposed service and how it would interact with the current out-of-market NBA League Pass service has not yet been determined, and the league had reportedly been in discussions with Amazon, DAZN, ESPN and YouTube TV. Some of the teams that negotiated new broadcasting deals this season have either negotiated short-term deals, or included exit clauses to facilitate participation in the hub once it is launched.

===== Folding of FanDuel Sports Network =====
FanDuel Sports Network wound down operations after the 2025–26 season, impacting 13 teams. Both DAZN and FuboTV expressed interest in acquiring rights to all or some of these teams, although Fubo later pulled its offers as it found that they were not "fiscally prudent". In preparation for the streaming hub, the NBA formed a new in-house production division led by former ESPN and NESN executive Matt Volk, which is reportedly serving most of the former FDSN teams.

- The Detroit Pistons signed a multi-year agreement with Scripps Sports to carry games on WMYD and streaming on a branded subscription service on DAZN, replacing FanDuel Sports Network Detroit.
- The Miami Heat signed with BH Media's WPLG to carry the team's games on broadcast television and streaming on the Local 10+ Platinum app in the Miami market, replacing FanDuel Sports Network Sun. The team also affiliated with WTCN (Palm Beach) and WINK-DT3 (Fort Myers)
- The Milwaukee Bucks signed with Good Karma Sports, owner of their radio partner WTMJ, to distribute the team's games on a broadcast network and DTC service, replacing FanDuel Sports Network Wisconsin. The flagship station will be Rincon's WVTV-DT2 in Milwaukee; WVTV had last carried Bucks games in 1993–94. The Bucks will offer a DTC subscription service known as "Bucks+", which is housed within the NBA app.
- The Atlanta Hawks announced a multi-year agreement with Gray Media and Raycom Sports to broadcast games on WANF in Atlanta and Peachtree Sports Network for the rest of Georgia, replacing FanDuel Sports Network Southeast. The team also announced a DTC agreement with Prime Video, with all regional Hawks games being available to Amazon Prime subscribers within the team's market area.
- The Minnesota Timberwolves, Indiana Pacers, Cleveland Cavaliers, San Antonio Spurs and Memphis Grizzlies all signed agreements with DAZN to serve as their exclusive regional broadcaster, replacing FanDuel Sports Network North, Indiana, Ohio, Southwest and Southeast respectively. In all five cases, games will stream on a branded subscription service on DAZN, with a limited package of games streaming for free on DAZN and simulcast on broadcast television: On October 26, 2026, DirecTV announced an agreement with DAZN to carry all five teams on DirecTV, DirecTV Stream, and U-verse TV for home and business customers in their home markets.
  - The Cavaliers will simulcast 15 games for free on DAZN and a broadcast television partner. Its broadcasts are produced in-house by Rock Entertainment Sports Network, a joint venture between Cavs owner Dan Gilbert and Gray Media.
  - The Grizzlies will simulcast 15 games for free on DAZN and WATN-TV.
  - The Pacers will stream 22 games for free on DAZN; 15 of these games will be simulcast by a broadcast television partner.
  - The Spurs will simulcast 22 games for free on broadcast television. The Spurs' subscription will also include content from the Austin Spurs—the team's G League affiliate, and sister USL Championship soccer team San Antonio FC.
  - The Timberwolves will simulcast 15 games for free on DAZN and KARE.
- The Charlotte Hornets and Orlando Magic both signed with Cox Media Group to carry games on broadcast television, replacing FanDuel Sports Network Southeast and Florida; the Hornets' and Magic's flagship stations will be WAXN-TV and WRDQ respectively, while their parent ABC affiliates WSOC-TV and WFTV will also carry selected games. Both teams will host a direct-to-consumer service on DAZN.
- The Oklahoma City Thunder announced an agreement with Griffin Media to distribute games via the "Thunder Gameday Network", replacing FanDuel Sports Network Oklahoma. Most games will be broadcast via local television providers in the team's market (such as Cox Cable and DirecTV), airing on either cable-exclusive feeds of KSBI in Oklahoma City and KQCW in Tulsa (with the broadcasts being blacked out from the over-the-air feeds), or part-time channels elsewhere in-market. Ten games will air free-to-air, with six on KSBI and KQCW, and four games on their parent CBS stations KWTV and KOTV. The Thunder will also offer a DTC subscription service known as "Thunder+", which is housed within the NBA app.
- The Los Angeles Clippers announced a direct-to-distributor and DTC arrangement known as ClipperVision (reviving a DTC service the team offered from 2022 through 2025), replacing FanDuel Sports Network SoCal. Broadcasts are being distributed via partnerships with television providers in the team's market (including Charter, DirecTV, and FuboTV), as well as via a DTC service housed within the NBA app. 10 games will also be aired on broadcast television by KTLA.

===== Others =====
- In May 2026, Gray Media renewed its contract with the Phoenix Suns through 2030. As part of the agreement, digital rights to the team were taken over by Gray, with its DTC service renamed Suns+ and moved to the Arizona's Family Sports app.
- In July 2026, DAZN announced an agreement to become the direct-to-consumer platform for MSG Network and YES Network, the New York Knicks and Brooklyn Nets's respective local broadcast partners, replacing their joint Gotham Sports App. DAZN will also offer the Monumental Sports Network's Monumental+—the DTC service of the Washington Wizards—as an add-on subscription on its platform, after having acquired its operator ViewLift Media from Monumental and Wizards owner Ted Leonsis.
- The New Orleans Pelicans will, in addition to its existing broadcast carriage on the Gulf Coast Sports & Entertainment Network, simulcast 20 games on parent Fox station WVUE-DT.

==== International ====
- In Canada, the NBA renewed its existing national broadcast deals with Sportsnet (owned by the Toronto Raptors' parent company Rogers Sports & Media) and TSN, under an agreement through the 2035–36 season (aligned with the league's U.S. broadcast rights).
- In Mexico, Brazil, France, Italy, Spain, Germany, the United Kingdom and Ireland, and, beginning this season, in Canada, Prime Video will stream 20 additional regular-season games, along with the games being already aired in the United States, a conference final and the NBA Finals in six of the 11 years of the deal.
- ESPN will additionally air its slate of games in Latin America, sub-Saharan Africa, Oceania and the Netherlands, and will air games through Disney+ in select markets in Asia and Europe.
- NBC will additionally air its slate of games on Sky Sports in the United Kingdom and Italy and will distribute games in the Caribbean and sub-Saharan Africa.
- TNT Sports will air games internationally in Poland, Denmark, Finland, Norway, Sweden and Latin America (excluding Brazil and Mexico).

=== Radio ===
==== National ====
- ESPN Radio has rights to select regular-season games, all playoff games and rights to the NBA Finals.
- This is the seventh season of the league's muti-year deal with SiriusXM and SiriusXM Canada to simulcast all 30 teams' local regular-season and postseason broadcasts.

== Notable occurrences ==
- The NBA resumed its tradition of not scheduling any games on Election Day in the United States, which falls on November 3 in 2026. The league began this practice for three consecutive years in 2022, 2023 and 2024 to encourage fans to vote, but then held Election Day games on November 4, 2025. (Note: Multiple references:)
- On September 2, 2026 the NBA announced punishments related to the Los Angeles Clippers salary cap scandal. The Clippers were stripped of five first-round picks, one each from 2029 to 2033, given a $30 million fine, and owner Steve Ballmer was suspended from league and team activities for one year. Kawhi Leonard was required to pay the league $700,000, and two executives were also suspended without pay.
- On October 13, 2026 the NBA unveiled the courts of all 30 teams for the Emirates NBA Cup.
- On November 4, 2026, LeBron James became the first player in league history to reach 16,000 career regular-season field goals made.
