= Los Angeles Clippers salary cap scandal =

North American basketball league scandal

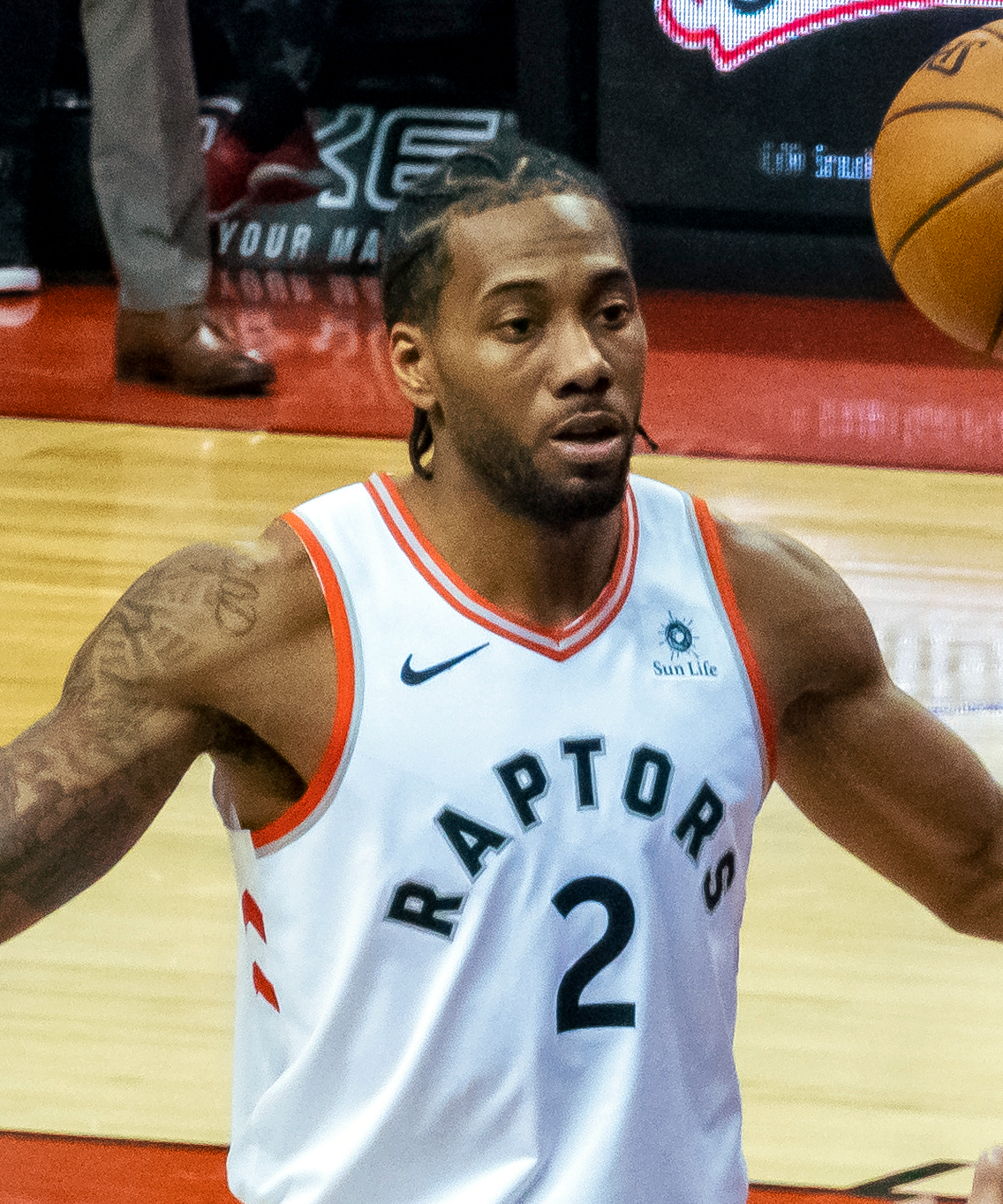
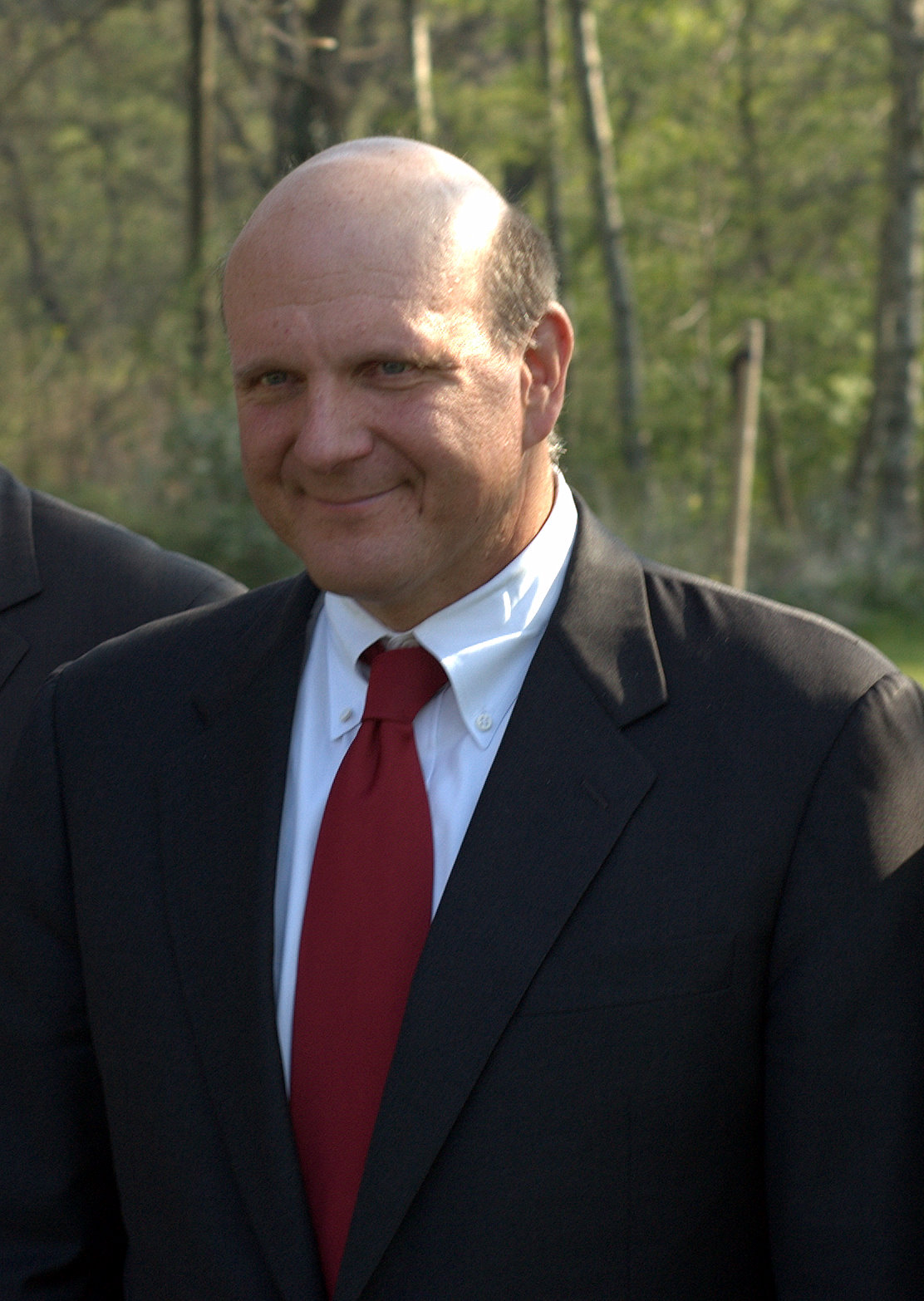
Kawhi Leonard (left) in 2019 and Steve Ballmer in 2007

In September 2025, sportswriter Pablo Torre revealed that the Los Angeles Clippers of the National Basketball Association (NBA) had avoided the league's salary cap when signing Kawhi Leonard by arranging no-show "endorsement" deals with affiliated firms to pay him tens of millions of dollars of off-court income, in violation of the NBA's collective bargaining agreement. Torre's reporting initially focused on the since-bankrupt financial services firm Aspiration; multiple additional no-show contracts were later uncovered.

After a yearlong investigation by the law firm Wachtell, Lipton, Rosen and Katz concluded there had been significant violations of NBA salary cap circumvention rules, in September 2026, the NBA levied one of the largest punishments in league history on the Clippers: stripping the team of five first-round picks, fining the team $30 million, and issuing suspensions for owner Steve Ballmer, other team executives, and Leonard's adviser and uncle, Dennis Robertson. Leonard was fined $700,000.

== Background ==
Kawhi Leonard became an unrestricted free agent after the 2018–19 season when he declined his player option for the 2019–20 season with the Toronto Raptors, who had just defeated the Golden State Warriors to win their first championship in the 2019 NBA Finals. In the run-up to free agency, the Los Angeles Clippers made an extensive effort to woo him after missing out on the trade that saw him leave the San Antonio Spurs to join the Raptors in July 2018. An early indication of the team's apparent willingness to appease Leonard and other players to recruit them was the firing of commentator Bruce Bowen from game broadcaster Fox Sports West in August 2018 after he criticized Leonard's portrayal of his hamstring injury and handling by the Spurs. During the 2018–19 season, Clippers officials attended numerous Raptors games to scout him, with the presence of high-level executives and their attendance frequency noted among media outlets; they allegedly scouted fellow imminent free agent Kevin Durant in a similar manner. (Note: Raptors officials estimated that their Clippers counterparts attended 75 percent of their games, while the latter estimated 50 percent; in an article for The Athletic, a source familiar with the Raptors' schedule gave an estimate of closer to 25 percent.) The Clippers had also reportedly explored the idea of purchasing Nike's portion of the rights to Leonard's "Klaw" logo after he signed a new sponsorship with New Balance, which Marc Stein of The New York Times noted would have likely violated salary cap rules but was a prominent example of the measures considered league-wide to recruit players with significantly beneficial performance influences like Leonard, with Stein pointing to the Raptors' success as support for this premise.

While Leonard desired to go the Los Angeles Lakers in the 2018 trade that sent him to the Raptors instead, that interest had seemingly diminished significantly by the time of his free agency in comparison to the Clippers, who reportedly became his preferred choice once LeBron James and Anthony Davis signed with the Lakers. Despite efforts from the Lakers to recruit Leonard to form a superteam, he ultimately signed with the Clippers for $103 million across three years in July 2019 after convincing Paul George to join the Clippers with him. As George was under contract with the Oklahoma City Thunder, the Clippers acquired him in exchange for Shai Gilgeous-Alexander and Danilo Gallinari along with five first-round picks and two pick swaps in the NBA draft.

After Leonard made his decision, the NBA initiated an investigation into the Clippers when its office began receiving reports that his uncle, Dennis Robertson, had allegedly requested items that were well outside the NBA collective bargaining agreement's guidelines on permissible benefits during negotiations with the Clippers, Lakers, and Raptors. These requests included partial ownership of the team, access to a private plane at all times, a house, and an expectation of guaranteed money from off-court endorsements if Leonard joined the team. Lakers owner Jeanie Buss reportedly pointed out the illegality of these requests and refused to consider them, despite Robertson's insistence. Robertson also allegedly elaborated on these requests during negotiations with Raptors owner Maple Leaf Sports & Entertainment (MLSE), asking for ownership stakes in the Toronto Maple Leafs and other MLSE-related entities, as well as an annual match of at least $10 million in sponsorship income without requiring any work; MLSE rejected these proposals.

The Athletic published a report on the requests and the investigation in December 2019, with Leonard denying the allegations at the time, according to USA Today. The NBA investigation found no evidence of the Clippers granting the requests, though league commissioner Adam Silver indicated that the league would reopen the case if it were to find relevant evidence. Despite that, the NBA decided to address the allegations by enacting new measures to strictly enforce tampering and salary cap circumvention rules during the NBA board of governors meeting in New York City in late September; penalties for violating such rules that were approved unanimously included maximum fines that were doubled to $10 million, loss of draft picks, and voiding of contracts. The league also enacted stricter regulations on communications from teams: interactions with sports agents were now required to be saved for one year, and the league was empowered to perform annual audits on five random teams concerning their interactions with agents and other teams.

=== Civil lawsuits ===
In December 2020, the Clippers were sued in Los Angeles County Superior Court by Johnny Wilkes, the younger brother of former NBA player James Wilkes and an associate of Robertson who was teammates with him on the boys basketball squad at Susan Miller Dorsey High School before they both graduated in 1980. Wilkes claimed that he met team consultant Jerry West in April 2019 at Staples Center about potentially providing information to the team to bolster their chances of signing Leonard; he accused West of verbally agreeing to solicit his services in exchange for $2.5 million in compensation on June 28, then reneging on it after Leonard signed with the team. Wilkes described passing along information to West such as talking points that Leonard was believed to be seeking from executives in recruiting meetings and using boxing agent Sam Watson and sportscaster Jim Gray as intermediaries between him and West; he also described relaying to Robertson that he would receive a house in Southern California, a travel expense, and a $100 million marketing campaign for Leonard funded by Ballmer as directed by the Clippers and West. The NBA launched an investigation into the allegations after initial reporting on the lawsuit by TMZ. The Clippers and West denied the allegations, with an attorney representing them characterizing the lawsuit as an attempted extortion, while Leonard denied that Wilkes' actions influenced his selection of the team. A judge dismissed the lawsuit in August 2022, stating that Wilkes failed to prove any enforceable contract for compensation and that the statements made in the compensation conversation were "too vague and uncertain" to support such a claim; an appeal to the California Courts of Appeal was denied in January 2024.

The Clippers were sued again in Los Angeles County in October 2024, this time by former strength and conditioning coach Randy Shelton, who was fired in July 2023. Having previously worked with Leonard for the San Diego State Aztecs men's basketball team and maintained a relationship with him through his early career, Shelton alleged that he was hired by the Clippers in July 2019 to help attract Leonard and that assistant general manager Mark Hughes committed NBA tampering violations by soliciting him numerous times for information on Leonard's contractual obligations with the Spurs and his medical circumstances, with the alleged communication starting shortly after Leonard sustained an ankle injury in the 2017 NBA Western Conference finals; Shelton also alleged that the Clippers mismanaged Leonard's rehabilitation from an anterior cruciate ligament injury sustained in the 2021 NBA playoffs in an effort to stay competitive. The Clippers denied Shelton's claims as frivolous, characterizing the lawsuit as another attempted shakedown stemming from their denial of his request for millions of dollars in compensation after his employment contract expired in June 2024; they also accused him of offering unqualified medical advice to players during his employment with the team and stated that they would attempt to bring the case to arbitration per the terms of the contract signed by him in November 2021. The case was in arbitration as of September 2026.

== Investigations ==
=== Initial Aspiration reports ===
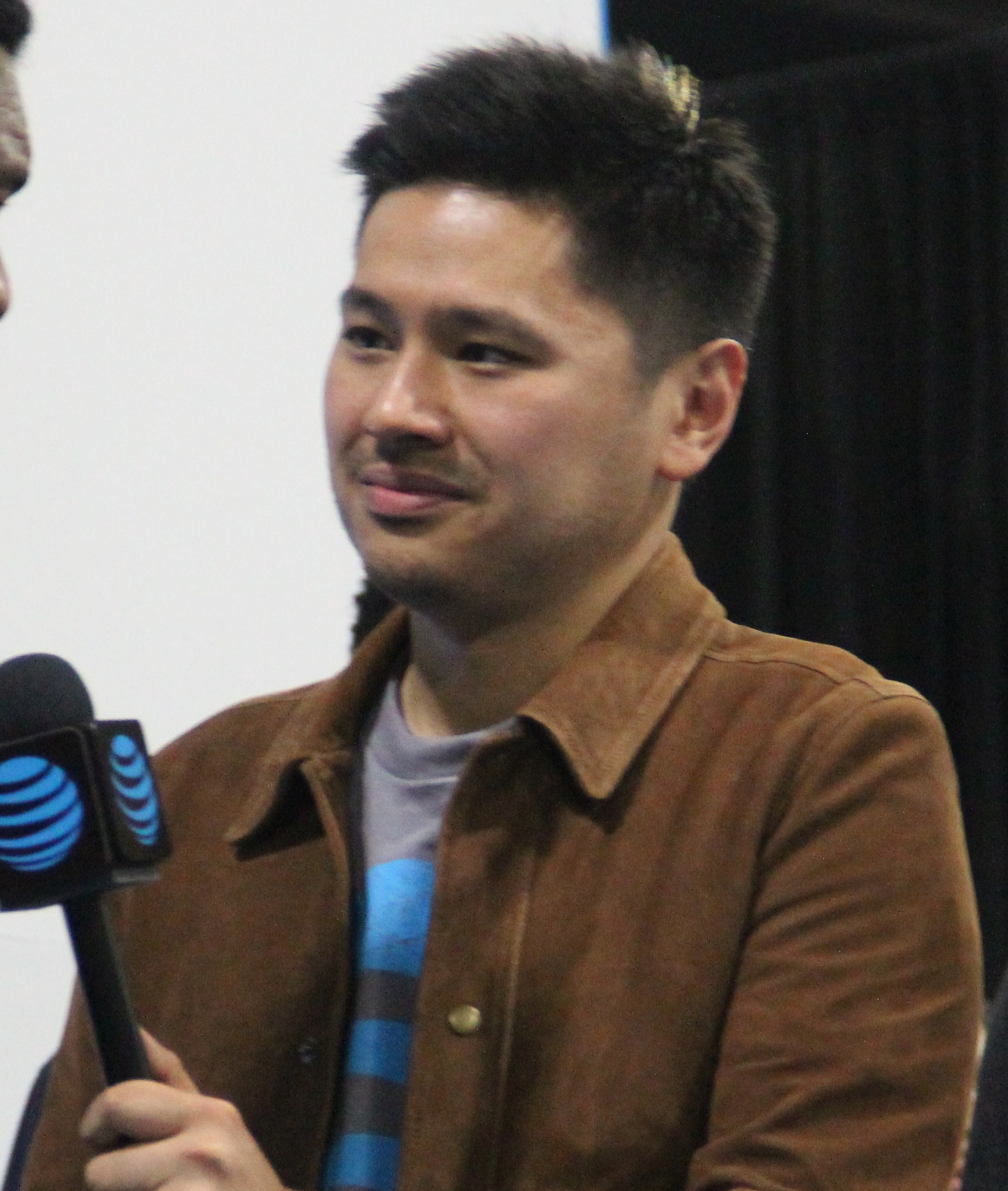
Pablo Torre

On September 3, 2025, sportswriter Pablo Torre first reported on his podcast, Pablo Torre Finds Out, that Kawhi Leonard had signed a $28 million, four-year endorsement deal in 2021 with Aspiration, a since-bankrupt fraudulent environmental company, in which team owner Steve Ballmer had invested $50 million. Torre had found evidence of the previously unreported contract because a limited liability corporation linked to Leonard was listed as a creditor in Aspiration's bankruptcy filings, and he conducted an anonymous interview with an alleged former employee of Aspiration who claimed the contract was intended to violate the salary cap. As part of the "no-show" deal, Leonard was not required to perform any action other than remaining a Clipper player, and had never performed any endorsement activity for Aspiration. John Karalis of the Boston Sports Journal later reported that Leonard had additionally received $20 million in Aspiration stock, making the total promised compensation $48 million.

The Clippers immediately denied the allegations in team statements, calling them "absurd" and "flat out wrong." On September 4, Ballmer gave a televised interview to Ramona Shelburne on ESPN, claiming that the team had introduced Leonard to Aspiration after signing a $300 million sponsorship contract with the company (which is allowed under NBA rules) but had no further involvement in the eventual contract Leonard had formed with Aspiration. He additionally emphasized that he had been "conned" as an investor in the fraudulent company.

Torre released another podcast episode on September 11, revealing that in December 2022, Clippers co-chairman Dennis Wong had invested $1.9 million in Aspiration nine days before Leonard had been paid $1.75 million; this was despite the company facing financial difficulties at that point and having laid off 20% of its staff on that same day.

On September 29, Leonard denied that the endorsement deal was cheating, saying "none of us did...wrongdoing" and "I don't deal with conspiracies." He additionally stated that he "didn't think it was accurate" that he provided no endorsement services to Aspiration, and that he was still owed money from the company.

In March 2026, Pablo Torre won that year's Pulitzer Prize for Audio Reporting for his work uncovering the scandal.

=== Daktronics and other allegations ===
Throughout 2026, Torre published more undisclosed endorsement deals Leonard had with other companies, including a sponsorship with Intuit Dome scoreboard constructor Daktronics. A former Dome contractor described the deal as "1,000% a way to circumvent the salary cap" and a way for "funneling money from the Clippers through Daktronics back to Kawhi."

=== NBA investigation ===
The same day Torre released his initial podcast episode, the NBA announced it was investigating Torre's allegations, having hired law firm Wachtell, Lipton, Rosen and Katz, which had previously investigated former Clippers owner Donald Sterling.

On August 17, 2026, ESPN published an article claiming the NBA had found "no evidence" that Ballmer funneled money to Leonard via sponsors, according to at least three sources with knowledge of the situation. The NBA quickly released a statement disputing this claim, saying the article contained "significant and numerous" inaccuracies. After the full investigation was later published, ESPN faced significant retrospective backlash for this incorrect report, drawing "widespread criticism" from media industry insiders for its coverage of the scandal.

On September 2, 2026, Wachtell, Lipton, Rosen, and Katz released its full investigation report, which concluded that the Clippers had violated the circumvention rules in "numerous independent ways," including initiating no-show endorsement contracts with four different companies who were actively pursuing business with the team, inducing these companies to enter into contracts with Leonard by providing them business with the Clippers (for example, giving Leonard an endorsement deal was a precondition of Daktronics receiving a large contract to build the Intuit Dome scoreboard), and in some cases participating in the development of deal terms. The investigation additionally found that the Clippers had paid for personal expenses on behalf of Leonard in violation of league rules and failed to report solicitations for off-court income.

The investigators held President of Business Operations Gillian Zucker and President of Basketball Operations Lawrence Frank "directly and primarily culpable" for the rules violations, and held Ballmer responsible for both improperly facilitating off-court endorsement opportunities and failing to create a team environment which abided by the rules.

In addition to confirming Torre's reporting regarding Daktronics, the investigation revealed that Leonard also had previously unreported endorsement contracts with Boingo Wireless and Lockton and that Leonard had been paid over $18 million by the three companies by August 2021. Zucker had close personal relationships with executives at two of the companies. The three aforementioned companies had additionally been paid multi-million dollar "consulting" fees by the Clippers around the time they had endorsed Leonard, and the investigation reported that a witness had provided evidence that these consulting contracts were "shams" made principally to fund the endorsement payments to Leonard. This particular claim is still under ongoing investigation by Wachtell Lipton.

=== Federal investigations ===
During its first quarter earnings call on September 2, 2026—the same day the NBA investigation report was released—Daktronics revealed that the United States Securities and Exchange Commission was investigating its contract with Leonard and had requested information from the company regarding the deal. Howard Atkins, the company's chief financial officer, stated that "we take these requests seriously and are cooperating."

On September 10, The New York Times reported that the United States Department of Justice had opened a criminal investigation into the sponsorship contracts prior to the release of the NBA investigation report, with the U.S. attorney's office in Brooklyn handling the investigation; two sources briefed on the matter indicated that prosecutors had already issued at least one subpoena for it.

== Punishment and reactions ==
The NBA punished the Clippers by stripping the franchise of five first-round picks, issuing a $30 million fine, and suspending three people associated with the Clippers: Ballmer, Zucker, and Frank. The former two were suspended from all team activities for one year, while the latter was suspended for six months. Leonard was also fined $700,000. This was among the largest punishments given to a team in NBA history. The league also said that it would subject the Clippers to "a compliance and monitoring program" for five years.

NBA Commissioner Adam Silver said in a statement, "I am deeply disappointed by the flagrant violations of our rules and by the Clippers' institutional and leadership failures that led to this misconduct. The severity of the penalties reflects the seriousness of the violations."

Leonard issued a statement through his agent accepting responsibility for the incident, stating, "Integrity and respect for this game are fundamental to who I am. I accept full responsibility for lapses in judgment by people within my inner circle and regret the distraction this situation has caused the fans and my family."

The Clippers released an initial statement that "we vehemently reject the NBA's findings, which are the result of a heavily biased investigation seeking to justify a predetermined narrative rather than facts and evidence" and "we intend to vigorously challenge these findings and penalties through every avenue available to us and look forward to an ethical and impartial arbitration process." Team attorney David Kelley additionally sent a letter to the League office, writing, "This investigation has been flawed from the outset ... this type of witch hunt flies in the face of fundamental fairness and of the integrity of the league and of this sport that we all love. We are exploring every legal remedy to address this gross injustice.

Torre performed a livestream analyzing the report with his podcast co-hosts on YouTube the same day it was released. In an interview with The Athletic the following day, Torre described his reaction to the report as one of delight rather than triumphalism, remarking that he enjoyed the reactions of people realizing the reason behind his investigative work and assessing that he seemingly fulfilled a huge appetite among his audience for the ability to hold ultra-rich people accountable for their actions; he also emphasized his hope that people can trust the process and results of investigative journalism without a confirmation from the subject of interest.

Less than two weeks after the report announcement, the Clippers reversed course on September 13, with Ballmer announcing via a social media post that the team would accept the punishment despite still dissenting on the report's findings to discourage further distraction from him. The post stated that the scandal "has been a very difficult time for everybody associated with the Clippers, and for that, I have sincere regrets. I want to apologize to our fans, employees and my fellow NBA team owners for the distraction and the distress this matter has caused, for which I accept responsibility as principal owner." A trade of Leonard to the Raptors was completed the following day, with the Clippers receiving Brandon Ingram, Gradey Dick, a 2027 first-round pick swap, a 2030 second-round pick, a 2031 unprotected first-round pick, and one unprotected first-round and second-round pick each in 2033. The trade was agreed to by both parties at the end of June 2026, but its finalization was postponed from the following month as the investigation continued, then delayed further as the Clippers reshuffled their front office due to the suspensions.

Ballmer nominated John Gibson, a trial lawyer based in Los Angeles, as the interim governor and chief executive officer (CEO) of the Clippers in his stead, with the NBA approving him on September 21. Gibson, who is a longtime season ticket holder of the team and a former litigation partner at DLA Piper, named general manager Trent Redden as interim president of basketball operations in the stead of Frank two days later; Gibson also gave Redden's previous duties to Mark Hughes in naming him as interim general manager.
