= Lawrence Frank =

American basketball coach and executive (born 1970)

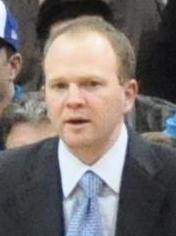
- Frank in 2012 as Detroit Pistons head coach

Los Angeles Clippers
- Position: President of basketball operations
- League: NBA

Personal information
- Born: August 23, 1970 (age 56) New York City, New York, U.S.

Career information
- High school: Teaneck (Teaneck, New Jersey)
- College: Indiana University Bloomington (BS)
- Coaching career: 1992–2016

Career highlights
- As executive: NBA Executive of the Year (2020)

Lawrence Adam Frank (born August 23, 1970) is an American basketball coach and executive (currently suspended for rulebreaking) who serves as president of basketball operations for the Los Angeles Clippers of the National Basketball Association (NBA). Frank formerly served as head coach of the Detroit Pistons and the New Jersey Nets, and has been an assistant coach for the Boston Celtics and the Brooklyn Nets.

Frank was honored with the 2020 NBA Executive of the Year Award after acquiring both Paul George and Kawhi Leonard during the 2019 offseason. He is currently suspended from his job for his role in the Los Angeles Clippers salary cap scandal, which he helped mastermind in order to convince Leonard to stay with the Clippers by giving him extra money to circumvent the salary cap.

== Early life and education ==
Frank was born in New York City, and grew up in Teaneck, New Jersey. He graduated from Teaneck High School in 1988 but never made the school's basketball team. He attended Camp Greylock for Boys, a sports camp in the Berkshires. Frank, who is Jewish, played for a Jewish Community Center team and was also a player-coach for a Catholic Youth Organization team.

He earned his B.S. in education from Indiana University in 1992, where he spent four seasons as a manager for the Hoosier basketball team coached by Bob Knight. While he was at Indiana, the Hoosiers won the Big Ten Conference championship twice, first in the 1988–89 season and again in the 1990–91 season. His senior year, during the 1991–92 season, Indiana reached the 1992 NCAA Final Four, ultimately losing to Duke.

Frank has frequently cited Knight as a role model and mentor. Asked what he learned most of Knight, he said, "It's more of what he stood for. If you work hard and are trustworthy it will carry you a long way. Master your subject matter, have confidence, be reliable and sincere. He is a great mentor and teacher to have at age 18. With him you started at the bottom and were given nothing. Everything you got, you earned—sweat equity."

== Coaching career ==
=== Assistant coach ===
Frank served as an assistant coach at the University of Tennessee for three seasons under Head coach Kevin O'Neill. Frank first worked with O'Neill as a staff assistant at Marquette University in 1992 and during his tenure, helped lead the Marquette Warriors to two NCAA tournament berths and a Sweet Sixteen appearance in 1994.

Frank then spent three seasons as an assistant coach for the Vancouver Grizzlies under Brian Hill. Hill would later serve as Frank's assistant with the New Jersey Nets. His responsibilities with the Grizzlies included scouting upcoming opponents as well as practice and bench coaching duties.

=== Head coach ===
Frank became the interim head coach of the New Jersey Nets on January 26, 2004, succeeding Byron Scott, after serving as an assistant coach with the team since the 2000–01 season. He officially became the head coach of the Nets on June 21, 2004.

Frank began his NBA head coaching career by achieving a 13–0 record from January 27 to February 24, 2004, setting a new NBA record for the most consecutive wins by a rookie NBA head coach. The 13-game winning streak was also the longest winning streak of a rookie head coach in any of North America's four major professional sports leagues. During this streak, the Nets won six consecutive games on the road, giving Frank the mark for the most consecutive road-game wins by a rookie head coach.

The Nets picked up the extension option in Frank’s contract on June 6, 2006, and added a two-year extension on July 23, 2007. However, Frank's tenure as Nets head coach ended on November 29, 2009, after the Nets began the season with an 0–16 record. This streak was ongoing at the time of his dismissal and continued afterwards. Frank was the only coach ever in the NBA to start and end his tenure with a team with a double-digit winning streak and losing streak. Following his firing, Frank worked as an analyst for NBATV. On July 15, 2010, Frank was hired by the Boston Celtics, replacing Tom Thibodeau as the lead assistant coach on Doc Rivers' coaching staff.

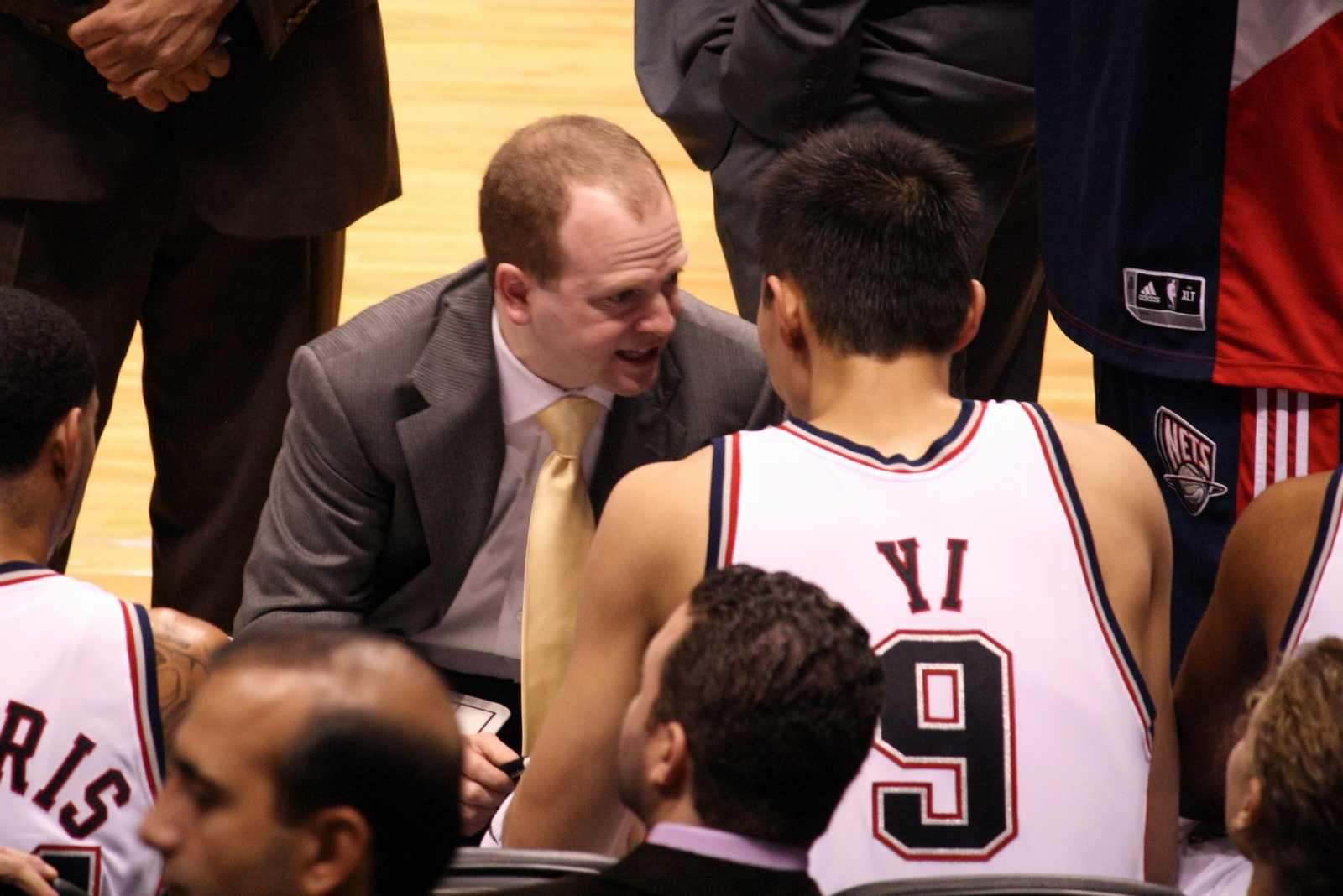
Frank coaching the New Jersey Nets in 2008

On August 3, 2011, Frank was introduced as the head coach of the Detroit Pistons.

After a loss to Oklahoma City Thunder on November 12, 2012, the Pistons fell to 0–8. This made Frank the third coach in the history of the NBA to start at least 0–8 with two separate franchises.

On April 18, 2013, Frank was fired by the Pistons after going 54–94 in two seasons.

On June 28, 2013, he gave in to rookie coach Jason Kidd's rather public recruiting efforts to make Frank (who had coached Kidd when he played for the Nets) his lead assistant coach on the now-Brooklyn Nets. Frank's contract made him the highest-paid assistant coach in the NBA at the time (approximately $6 million over 6 years). Preferring to delegate his authority, Kidd stated that Frank's role would be to run the team's defense, while being Kidd's head-coaching mentor. Kidd placed another assistant coach, John Welch, in charge of the team's offense.

On December 3, 2013, Frank was demoted—relegated by Nets head coach Jason Kidd to merely filing team evaluation reports. This so-called "re-assignment" meant that Frank would be banned from being on the bench during games and from even attending team practices. This resulted from escalating tensions and squabbling between the two over the 'right' coaching philosophies, strategies, and tactics for the team.

On September 25, 2014, Frank joined the Los Angeles Clippers staff after reaching a buyout agreement with the Nets.

== Executive career ==
On June 30, 2016, the Clippers promoted Frank to Executive Vice President of Basketball Operations.

On August 4, 2017, Frank was promoted to President for Basketball Operations. He succeeded Doc Rivers, who was removed by Clippers chairman Steve Ballmer to focus on his role as head coach. Frank won the 2020 NBA Executive of the Year award after orchestrating the acquisitions of All-Stars Kawhi Leonard and Paul George during the 2019 offseason.

In September of 2025, journalist Pablo Torre broke the Los Angeles Clippers salary cap scandal (involving Kawhi Leonard and a handful of sponsors, including Daktronics, Boingo Wireless, and bankrupt Aspiration, Inc.) which heavily implicated Frank. In the midst of these allegations, on January 27, 2026, Frank and the Clippers agreed to a four-year contract extension. On September 2, 2026, Frank was suspended for six months following the conclusion of the NBA investigation and the release of its report, which essentially confirmed Torre's reporting.

== Personal life ==
Frank has a wife and two daughters and lives in New Jersey during the offseason.

In addition to his degree from Indiana University Bloomington, Frank also holds an M.S. in education administration from Marquette University.

== Head coaching record ==
Legend
Regular season	G	Games coached	W	Games won	L	Games lost	W–L %	Win–loss %
Playoffs	PG	Playoff games	PW	Playoff wins	PL	Playoff losses	PW–L %	Playoff win–loss %

Team	Year	G	W	L	W–L%	Finish	PG	PW	PL	PW–L%	Result
New Jersey	2003–04	40	25	15	.625	1st in Atlantic	11	7	4	.636	Lost in Conference semifinals
New Jersey	2004–05	82	42	40	.512	3rd in Atlantic	4	0	4	.000	Lost in First round
New Jersey	2005–06	82	49	33	.598	1st in Atlantic	11	5	6	.455	Lost in Conference semifinals
New Jersey	2006–07	82	41	41	.500	2nd in Atlantic	12	6	6	.500	Lost in Conference semifinals
New Jersey	2007–08	82	34	48	.415	4th in Atlantic	—	—	—	—	Missed playoffs
New Jersey	2008–09	82	34	48	.415	4th in Atlantic	—	—	—	—	Missed playoffs
New Jersey	2009–10	16	0	16	.000	(fired)	—	—	—	—	—
Detroit	2011–12	66	25	41	.379	4th in Central	—	—	—	—	Missed playoffs
Detroit	2012–13	82	29	53	.354	4th in Central	—	—	—	—	Missed playoffs
Career		614	279	335	.454		38	18	20	.474	

== See also ==
- List of people banned or suspended by the NBA
