= List of NBA general managers =

This is a list of National Basketball Association general managers.

== List ==
Team	General Manager	Division	Conference	Date of hire	College	Professional career	Ref.
Atlanta Hawks	Onsi Saleh	Southeast	Eastern	2022	Stanford University	2010-2015	
Boston Celtics	Brad Stevens	Atlantic	Eastern	2021	DePauw University		
Brooklyn Nets	Sean Marks	Atlantic	Eastern	2016	California	1998–2011	
Charlotte Hornets	Jeff Peterson	Southeast	Eastern	2024	Iowa		
Chicago Bulls	Stephen Mervis	Central	Eastern	2026	University of Florida		
Cleveland Cavaliers	Brandon Weems	Central	Eastern	2026	University of Kentucky		
Dallas Mavericks	Mike Schmitz	Southwest	Western	2026	University of Arizona		
Denver Nuggets	Ben Tenzer	Northwest	Western	2025	University of Colorado		
Detroit Pistons	Michael Blackstone	Central	Eastern	2024	University of Baltimore		
Golden State Warriors	Mike Dunleavy Jr.	Pacific	Western	2023	Duke University	2002–2017	
Houston Rockets	Rafael Stone	Southwest	Western	2020	Williams College, Stanford (J.D.)		
Indiana Pacers	Chad Buchanan	Central	Eastern	2017	Simpson College	1990–1996	
Los Angeles Clippers	Trent Redden	Pacific	Western	2023	SMU		
Los Angeles Lakers	Rob Pelinka	Pacific	Western	2017	Michigan	College	
Memphis Grizzlies	Zach Kleiman	Southwest	Western	2019	USC, Duke (J.D.)		
Miami Heat	Andy Elisburg	Southeast	Eastern	2013	St. Thomas University		
Milwaukee Bucks	Jon Horst	Central	Eastern	2017	Rochester (Mich.)	College	
Minnesota Timberwolves	Matt Lloyd	Northwest	Western	2024			
New Orleans Pelicans	Troy Weaver	Southwest	Western	2025	Prince George's Community College		
New York Knicks	William Wesley	Atlantic	Eastern	2026	Brandywine College		
Oklahoma City Thunder	Sam Presti	Northwest	Western	2007	Virginia Wesleyan, Emerson	College (D3)	
Orlando Magic	Anthony Parker	Southeast	Eastern	2023	Bradley		
Philadelphia 76ers	Jameer Nelson	Atlantic	Eastern	2026	Saint Joseph's University	2004-2018	
Phoenix Suns	Brian Gregory	Pacific	Western	2025	Michigan State University		
Portland Trail Blazers	Joe Cronin	Northwest	Western	2021	Le Moyne		
Sacramento Kings	Scott Perry	Pacific	Western	2025	Wayne State University		
San Antonio Spurs	Brian Wright	Southwest	Western	2019	Central Florida		
Toronto Raptors	Bobby Webster	Atlantic	Eastern	2017	California		
Utah Jazz	Justin Zanik	Northwest	Western	2019	Northwestern University		
Washington Wizards	Will Dawkins	Southeast	Eastern	2023	Emerson College		

== See also ==
- NBA Executive of the Year Award
- List of current NBA head coaches
- List of NBA team presidents
- List of NBA team owners
