= Neil Olshey =

American basketball executive

Personal information
- Born: January 10, 1965 (age 61) Queens, New York, U.S.

Career information
- High school: Xavier (New York City)
- College: Le Moyne College

Neil Olshey (born January 10, 1965) is an American basketball executive who most recently served as the general manager of the Portland Trail Blazers of the National Basketball Association (NBA). Prior to that, he was general manager and vice president of basketball operations of the Los Angeles Clippers.

== Early life and education ==
Olshey is a graduate of Le Moyne College in Syracuse, New York where he played on the D3 lacrosse team. Neil grew up in Flushing, Queens, but attended Xavier High School in Manhattan.

== Career ==
Olshey originally sought to become a professional actor following his graduation from college, and moved to New York City to pursue this career. He appeared in television commercials and print advertisements, and had roles on All My Children, One Life to Live, and Loving before moving to Los Angeles.

Olshey later served as director of player development for SFX Sports Group, Inc., where he created, organized and conducted NBA pre-draft training camps that produced 15 lottery picks, 25 first-round selections and 57 current NBA players. He was also an assistant coach at Artesia High School in Lakewood, California, where he coached future UCLA and NBA player Jason Kapono.

Prior to the start of the 2003–04 season, he joined the Los Angeles Clippers as director of player personnel and became an assistant coach at the beginning of the 2004–05 season. Prior to the start of the 2008–09 season, Olshey was elevated to the position of assistant general manager. He was named general manager on March 9, 2010, upon the firing of Mike Dunleavy Sr. In June 2012, he became the general manager of the Portland Trail Blazers.

He appeared as himself on the IFC series Portlandia in episode 7 "Trail Blazers" of season 4.

After a month-long investigation into allegations of the Trail Blazers organization being a toxic environment created by Olshey, the team fired him on December 3, 2021.

Preceded by Chad Buchanan (interim)	Portland Trail Blazers general manager 2012–2021	Succeeded by Joe Cronin (interim)
