= Los Angeles Clippers =

National Basketball Association team in Inglewood, California

- 2026–27 Los Angeles Clippers season
- Conference: Western
- Division: Pacific
- Founded: 1970
- History: Buffalo Braves; 1970–1978; San Diego Clippers; 1978–1984; Los Angeles Clippers; 1984–present
- Arena: Intuit Dome
- Location: Inglewood, California
- Team colors: Navy blue, ember red, Pacific blue, silver
- Main sponsor: Visit Rwanda
- CEO: John Gibson (interim) (Note: Steve Ballmer is suspended until September 2027 for his role in the team's salary cap scandal; John Gibson is serving as the team's interim governor and chief executive officer (CEO) in his stead.)
- President: Trent Redden (interim) (Note: Trent Redden is serving as interim president of basketball operations in the stead of Lawrence Frank, who is suspended until March 2027 for his role in the team's salary cap scandal; the former's duties as general manager are assigned to Mark Hughes in the meantime.)
- General manager: Mark Hughes (interim)
- Head coach: Tyronn Lue
- Ownership: Steve Ballmer (suspended)
- Affiliation: San Diego Clippers
- Championships: 0
- Conference titles: 0
- Division titles: 3 (2013, 2014, 2024)
- Website: www.nba.com/clippers
Association	Icon	Statement

The Los Angeles Clippers are an American professional basketball team based in the Greater Los Angeles area. The Clippers compete in the National Basketball Association (NBA) as a member of the Pacific Division of the Western Conference. The team plays its home games at Intuit Dome in Inglewood, California, beginning with the 2024–25 NBA season. Previously, the Clippers played their home games at Crypto.com Arena in Los Angeles from 1999 to 2024, which they had shared with the NBA's Los Angeles Lakers, the Los Angeles Sparks of the Women's National Basketball Association (WNBA), and the Los Angeles Kings of the National Hockey League (NHL). They are frequently referred to as "the Clips" or "LAC".

The franchise was founded as the Buffalo Braves in 1970 as an expansion team. Led by Hall of Famer Bob McAdoo, the Braves reached the NBA playoffs three times during their eight seasons in Buffalo. Conflicts with the Canisius Golden Griffins over Buffalo Memorial Auditorium and the sale of the franchise led to their relocation from Buffalo to San Diego, California, in 1978 and subsequent rebranding as the San Diego Clippers, in reference to the sailing ships seen in San Diego Bay. The team saw little success on the court and missed the playoffs during all six of their years in San Diego.

In 1984, owner Donald Sterling controversially relocated the franchise to Los Angeles without NBA approval, which was permitted following legal action between the league and Sterling. Over the course of their first 27 seasons in Los Angeles, the Clippers qualified for the postseason only four times and won a single playoff round. They also have suffered from two scandals in recent decades, the first resulting in Sterling being forced to sell the team to Steve Ballmer, and the second costing them five years of first-round draft picks. They have been frequently described as a perennial loser in American professional sports, drawing unfavorable comparisons to the historically successful Lakers.

The Clippers' reputation improved during the 2010s, which saw them transform into consistent postseason contenders. Aided by the Lob City lineup of Blake Griffin, DeAndre Jordan, and Chris Paul, the team qualified for the playoffs in six consecutive seasons from 2012 to 2017 and won two consecutive division titles in 2013 and 2014, both firsts for the franchise. Despite this success, the Clippers struggled in the postseason and were frequently eliminated in the Conference Semifinals; the team only reached the conference finals for the first time in 2021. To date, they are the oldest franchise in North American professional sports to have never played in a championship game.

== History ==
=== 1970–1978: Buffalo Braves ===
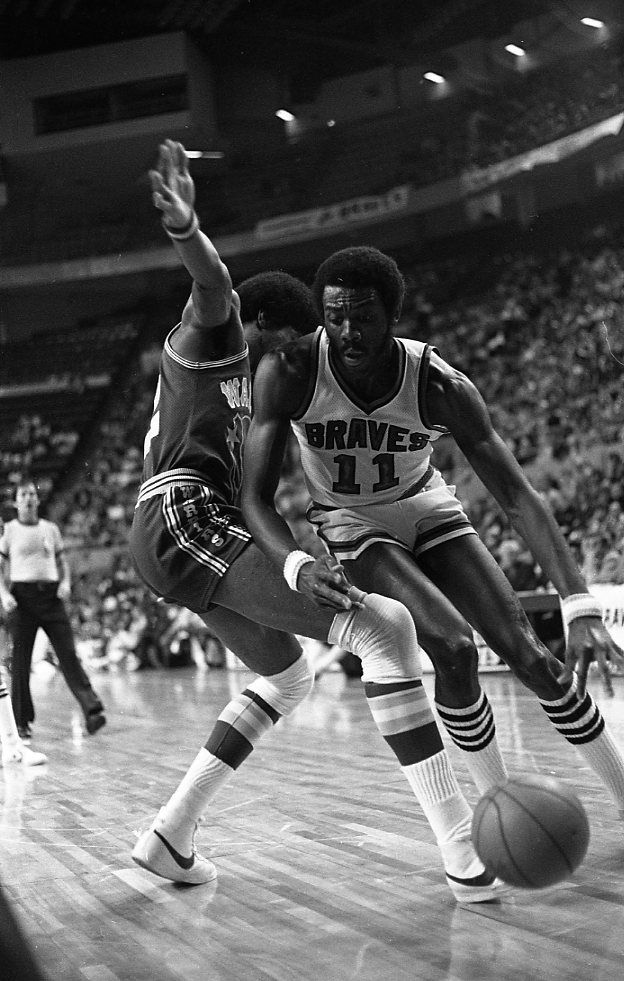
Bob McAdoo (11) was the NBA MVP in the 1974–75 season after averaging 34.5 points and 14.1 rebounds per game.

The franchise began in Western New York as the Buffalo Braves, one of three NBA expansion franchises that began play in the 1970–71 season, along with the Portland Trail Blazers and Cleveland Cavaliers. They played their home games at the Buffalo Memorial Auditorium, along with another Buffalo team that would begin play that year, the National Hockey League's Buffalo Sabres.

After two bad seasons, the Braves' fortunes started to change under coach Jack Ramsay and star center Bob McAdoo. McAdoo led the NBA in scoring for three consecutive seasons and was named the league's MVP in the 1974–75 season. The Braves qualified for the playoffs three times in a row, losing twice to the eventual Eastern Conference champions (the Boston Celtics in 1974 and 1976, and the Washington Bullets in 1975). Despite the team's modest success in Buffalo, Braves owner Paul Snyder and the league found it impossible to schedule home games at the auditorium because of the Canisius Golden Griffins men's basketball team, which had a pre-existing lease on the arena and priority on game dates over the Braves, with the next best dates in turn taken by the more successful Sabres.

At a time when the NBA was nearing a nadir and the league did not have its current prestige, the Griffins saw the Braves as a threat to their own success, and purposely scheduled better dates at the arena to prevent the Braves from succeeding. As a result, after a failed attempt to sell the team to an owner who intended to move it to South Florida, Snyder sold the team to Kentucky Colonels owner John Y. Brown, Jr., who decimated the team's roster, traded away all of its stars, and drove attendance down to the point where they could break their own lease on the arena.

Eventually, Brown met with Celtics owner Irv Levin in 1978 so they could trade franchise ownerships. Southern California resident Levin then decided to move the Braves to San Diego, something the league would have never allowed him to do with the Celtics. Asked about the move, Levin nominated a shorter commute for himself as a key reason.

=== 1978–1984: San Diego Clippers ===
In 1978, San Diego welcomed the Braves franchise to the city. The city's previous NBA franchise, the San Diego Rockets, had relocated to Houston seven years earlier in 1971. In between, the city hosted an ABA franchise, the San Diego Conquistadors, though that team folded partway through its fourth season after they had been renamed the Sails. San Diego team officials did not think "Braves" was a proper representative nickname for the club in San Diego, and a local naming contest ultimately decided on "Clippers", in reference to the city being known for the great sailing ships that passed through San Diego Bay. The first head coach of the Clippers was chosen to be Gene Shue, a respected tactician. He preferred a fast playing style with many scoring opportunities. Only three players from the Braves started in the team: Randy Smith, Swen Nater, and Scott Lloyd. Other starting players included Kermit Washington, and Sidney Wicks. World B. Free was also brought in from, the Philadelphia 76ers in exchange for a future first round pick.

The 1978–79 season started poorly, with the Clippers' first win coming in their fourth game, against the Chicago Bulls. The team lost 12 of its 18 first games and dropped to the bottom of the Pacific Division. Player Kevin Kunnert argued they had the "killer instinct of a field mouse". The worst loss came against the San Antonio Spurs, with a loss of 163 to 125. Nevertheless, within weeks, Free had become the leading scorer, as well as becoming a public icon. He finished second overall in NBA scoring average, with 28.9 per game (George Gervin of the San Antonio Spurs had a 29.6 average). Shue, meanwhile, tried to create a team spirit by creating a common social life. By the All-Star game the Clippers had improved, winning half of their 54 games, good enough for sixth in the Western Conference. Aiming for one of the six play-off spots for the Conference, they managed to win eight games in a row, and then another five games consecutively. Playing at the San Diego Sports Arena, the Clippers posted a record of 43–39 in their first season in California, leaving them two wins shy of the final playoff spot. It was also the first season in Southern California for long-time announcer Ralph Lawler, who began his association with the franchise.

The 1979–80 season saw the Clippers begin to struggle, despite adding center Bill Walton, a San Diego native who was two years removed from winning an NBA Championship and the NBA Most Valuable Player Award with the Portland Trail Blazers. Walton missed 68 games in his first season in San Diego due to foot injuries (which he also suffered in his final years in Portland). San Diego finished 35–47, as Walton and other key players missed significant time due to injuries. Free again finished second in league scoring, with 30.2 points per game. Paul Silas replaced Shue as head coach the following season, and the Clippers finished 36–46, again missing the postseason. Walton missed the entire season due to foot injuries, while Free was traded to the Golden State Warriors in exchange for guard Phil Smith.

The 1981–82 season brought ultimately unwelcome changes to the franchise as Levin sold the team to Los Angeles–area real estate developer and attorney Donald Sterling for $12.5 million. The Clippers experienced poor play, as foot injuries again caused Walton to miss the entire season, and the team limped to a 17–65 record. Rumors of a move to Sterling's hometown of Los Angeles and franchise mismanagement plagued the team immediately from the onset of Sterling's acquisition. On one occasion, Sterling was fined $10,000 by the NBA, the largest sum ever levied by the NBA against an owner at the time, for publicly guaranteeing the Clippers would lose enough games to contend for a high enough draft pick to select Ralph Sampson. On another, he was fined for flying his players to away games in coach seats on commercial airliners, a violation of the league's collective bargaining agreement. Hotels refused to house the Clippers because of alleged non-payment for previous accommodations on multiple occasions. A bus company in Newark once stranded the team at the airport after Sterling failed to pay for previous trips, which nearly caused the team to miss a scheduled regular-season game that day against the New Jersey Nets.

Sterling attempted to relocate the franchise to Los Angeles in June 1982 but the NBA denied his request. Sterling then filed an unsuccessful antitrust lawsuit against the league, which subsequently filed a countersuit against the club and the Los Angeles Memorial Sports Arena, which Sterling had a tentative agreement with to become the franchise's new home. The attempted move, combined with the franchise mismanagement issues, prompted an investigation of the Clippers by an NBA committee of other owners. In September of that year, the committee recommended that Sterling's ownership be terminated, having found that he was late in paying creditors and players. Days before a league scheduled vote in October to remove Sterling, he agreed to sell the team, and the league sought buyers who would keep the franchise in San Diego. At the suggestion of David Stern, then the league's vice president, Sterling was able to make a deal to maintain his position as owner, by instead handing over operations duties of the franchise to Alan Rothenberg, who became the team's president. A few months later in February 1983, Stern called the Clippers a "first-class" franchise, and the ouster of Sterling was no longer pursued. Later in 1983, Larry Fleisher, then the general counsel of the National Basketball Players Association, stated ''in all my years of involvement with the NBA, no team ever provided as much difficulties for the players than the Clippers under Sterling." "He almost caused three strikes last season.'' The team's final two seasons in San Diego were not much better on the court despite Walton finally returning to action, finishing 25–57 in 1982–83 and 30–52 in 1983–84.

In 1984, Sterling, after again being denied permission from the NBA to do so, moved the Clippers to Los Angeles. The NBA subsequently fined Sterling $25 million for violating league rules and filed a lawsuit demanding the franchise be returned to San Diego. The league threatened to dissolve the franchise if ownership did not comply and return the team to San Diego. Sterling then filed another antitrust lawsuit against the league (for $100 million). This time, thanks to the recent court decision that allowed Al Davis to move the Oakland Raiders of the National Football League (NFL) to Los Angeles, it appeared Sterling would win his case.

In September 1987, the league agreed to drop their lawsuit against the Clippers over the team's relocation to Los Angeles in exchange for Sterling dropping his case against the league, allowing him to keep the team in Los Angeles and decreasing his fine to $6 million.

Forty years after the NBA Clippers left San Diego, the Ontario Clippers of the NBA G League would relocate from Ontario, California, starting with the 2024–25 season, adopting the San Diego Clippers name as well as a modernized version of the "three sails" logo.

=== 1984–1989: Move to Los Angeles, and early struggles ===
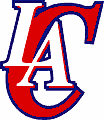
Los Angeles Clippers secondary logo from 1991 to 2010. A variation was used from 2010 to 2015.

In 1984, despite the pending lawsuits between franchise ownership and the NBA following the move, the Clippers began play at the Los Angeles Memorial Sports Arena. The Clippers finished their first season in Los Angeles 31–51 under head coach Jim Lynam.

The Clippers' early days in Los Angeles were marred with many seasons of hapless performances. Despite fielding a squad of talented veterans, the organization suffered systematic injuries to many of its star players. The phenomenon was dubbed the "Clipper Triangle" by some sportswriters, a reference to the Bermuda Triangle urban legend. Derek Smith suffered a knee injury during the 1985–86 season, followed by Norm Nixon (knee) and Marques Johnson (spinal cord) the following season. The team's 12–70 finish in the 1987 season was the second-worst single-season record in NBA history at the time (and is now the third-worst winning percentage in NBA history, behind the 1973 Philadelphia 76ers and the 2012 Charlotte Bobcats). That same season also saw Hall of Famer Elgin Baylor join the team as the general manager and vice president of basketball operations. Nixon suffered an ailing Achilles tendon in 1987–88 season, while number one draft pick rookie Danny Manning injured his anterior cruciate ligament during the 1988–89 campaign.

=== 1989–1994: Playoff appearances ===
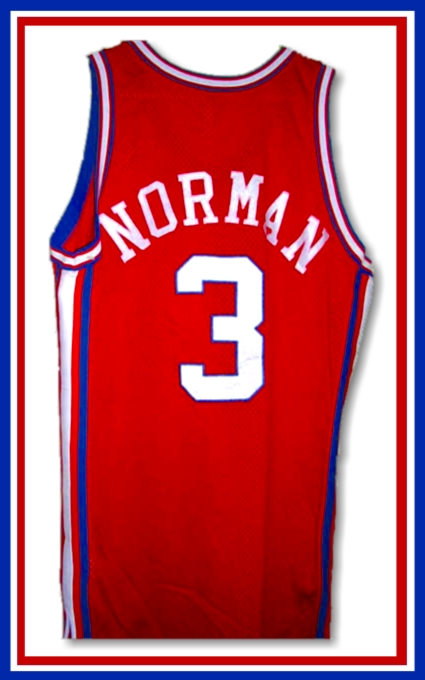
Ken Norman, the Clippers' scoring leader in 1988–89, was a key part of the team's nucleus during the late 1980s and early 1990s

The Clippers traded the rights to the recently drafted Danny Ferry and Reggie Williams for high-scoring shooting guard Ron Harper at the start of the 1989–90 season. Los Angeles had a 19–19 record nearly halfway into the season, prompting some to seriously consider the team as a possible playoff contender. That move, along with the 1987 NBA draft of Ken Norman, the 1988 selections of Danny Manning and Charles Smith (Smith was acquired from Philadelphia in exchange for the draft rights to Hersey Hawkins), and the 1990 draft of Loy Vaught, formed a nucleus that would make the franchise a playoff contender.

Midway through the 1991–92 season, the Clippers made yet another coaching change. Larry Brown, recently fired by the San Antonio Spurs, was hired as the team's head coach in late January 1992. He replaced Mike Schuler, who had led the team to a 22–25 record before his firing. Brown finished the season with a 23–12 mark, for a 45–37 overall—the franchise's first winning season in 13 years. For the first time since moving to Los Angeles, they finished with a better record than the crosstown Los Angeles Lakers. The Clippers advanced to the playoffs for the first time in 16 years (since the franchise's Buffalo heyday), but were eliminated in the first round of the playoffs by the Utah Jazz, 3–2. Due to the late April 1992 Los Angeles riots, the Anaheim Convention Center was the site of Game 4 of the series, which the Clippers won. The team made the playoffs again in the 1992–93 season with a 41–41 record, but lost again in five games in the first round, this time to the Rockets.

Brown left to become the Indiana Pacers' head coach after the season and Bob Weiss was brought in to replace him. That 1993–94 season proved to be one of the worst in Los Angeles history, with the Clippers and Lakers going a combined 60–104. In February 1994, the Clippers traded Manning to the Atlanta Hawks for Dominique Wilkins. Wilkins played 25 games for the club, averaging 29.1 points, 7.0 rebounds, and 2.2 assists in 37.9 minutes per game. After one year on the job, Weiss was fired, Wilkins left in free agency, and veteran head coach Bill Fitch was brought in to guide a new roster of young and inexperienced players.

=== 1994–2000: Fitch, Anaheim and the move to Staples Center ===
==== Anaheim relocation talks ====
Anaheim, a suburb approximately thirty miles (48 km) south of Downtown Los Angeles in Orange County, expressed interest in obtaining an NBA franchise. The city, expecting to lose the NFL's Los Angeles Rams (who relocated to St. Louis in 1995 for 21 seasons, before moving back to Los Angeles in 2016), was looking for a new professional team and began courting the Clippers, who struggled to carve out an identity competing against the popular Lakers for audience share. From 1994 to 1999, the Clippers played several games annually (usually five to eight regular-season games a season, and an annual preseason game) at the Arrowhead Pond of Anaheim, sharing the venue with the NHL's Ducks and the Splash indoor soccer team. Clippers games regularly drew a much-higher average attendance per game at the Pond than when the team played its home games at their regular venue, the Los Angeles Sports Arena. For instance, between 1994 and 1997, the Clippers drew an average of nearly 16,000 fans per game at the Pond, while in Los Angeles, they drew in the neighborhood of 9,200 per home game. Anaheim officials and the Clippers had had on-going talks about moving to Anaheim full-time years before the Pond was eventually built, as Donald Sterling was pursuing options to play elsewhere in the Los Angeles metropolitan region if there was not a replacement for the Sports Arena being built.

The Clippers, however, nearly moved to Anaheim permanently in time for the 1996–97 season, but according to a Los Angeles Times article published in June 1996, owner Donald Sterling turned down a deal that would have paid the team $95 million over 12 years. Odgen Corporation, who at the time managed the Pond, and the city of Anaheim offered the Clippers a multi-tiered deal that would have included upwards of $33 million paid to the team over the first six years of their Pond agreement, plus other monies allocated towards new locker rooms, team offices, and a practice facility. In another related Times article, Odgen and Sterling were in talks to have the management company take care of the Clippers' day-to-day operations for a $4 million a year fee. Also at the time, the Walt Disney Company, owners of the Ducks and Anaheim Angels baseball team during that period, were pursuing at least a partial ownership of the Clippers, with the key element being that its game telecasts would be part of a planned ESPN regional network for Southern California. However, as the planned ESPN West network never came to reality, all three teams had continued to maintain broadcast partnerships with Fox Sports West and Prime Ticket. This remained a sticking point in any deal to relocate to Anaheim, eventually leaving the team to remain in Los Angeles.

==== Bill Fitch era ====
On the court, the Clippers continued to make frequent roster changes throughout this particular period, which only resulted in one playoff appearance under Fitch. Along with Loy Vaught, a collection of young players (including Lamond Murray, Eric Piatkowski, and Lorenzen Wright), and journeyman veterans (among them Pooh Richardson, Tony Massenburg, Rodney Rogers, Darrick Martin, and Brian Williams), the Fitch-coached teams during this particular era struggled mightily, although they did make the playoffs once during this time. The 1996–97 team made the playoffs with a losing record (36–46) and were swept in the first round by the eventual Western Conference champions, the Utah Jazz, three games to none.

Four members of the 1996–97 squad are now deceased. Malik Sealy died in a car accident in 2000, Kevin Duckworth died of heart disease in 2008, Lorenzen Wright went missing and was murdered in 2010, and Dwayne Schintzius died from cancer complications in 2012. Two other players from the Fitch era suffered tragic circumstances of their own; Brian Williams (who played for the Clippers during the 1995–96 season, and later became known as Bison Dele) was believed to have been murdered by his brother while the two were vacationing in 2002 while in the South Pacific, and Rodney Rogers became paralyzed after a dirt bike crash in 2008 in his native North Carolina.

In December, Vaught, the team's leading scorer for the past three seasons, had season-ending back surgery. Without Vaught, the Clippers finished 17–65, the third-worst record in the league. Fitch was fired after the 1997–98 season (and later sued the team to recover the remaining money on his contract), and was replaced by one of his proteges, former Celtics and Bucks coach Chris Ford. Meanwhile, Vaught's career as a Clipper was effectively finished, as he left as a free agent after that season, and signed with the Detroit Pistons; at the time of his departure, he was the franchise's all-time rebounds leader with 4,471 (a number that was later surpassed by Elton Brand, with 4,710).

The Clippers won the first overall pick in the 1998 Draft Lottery and selected center Michael Olowokandi from University of the Pacific. The team had a 0–17 start and finished with a 9–41 record in the lockout-shortened 1998–99 season. They were led by second-year forward Maurice Taylor, who averaged 16.8 points per game, and won the fourth overall pick in the following draft, which coincided with their move to the Staples Center. The Clippers would draft Lamar Odom, and then hired former All-Star (and Los Angeles native) Dennis Johnson as an assistant coach, as well as Hall of Fame former Laker great Kareem Abdul-Jabbar to help tutor Olowokandi during his second-year. Johnson remained an assistant coach until the middle of the 2002–03 season, when he took over as head coach. Abdul-Jabbar remained only one season, detailing a lack of improvement in Olowokandi, who is largely considered one of the biggest draft busts in league history.

During the 1999 off-season, Rodney Rogers signed with the Phoenix Suns. The Clippers also sent Lamond Murray to the Cleveland Cavaliers for Derek Anderson and Johnny Newman. However, Newman was then traded to the New Jersey Nets for Eric Murdock a month later without ever playing a game for the Clippers. The team finished with the worst record in the league (15–67) in the 1999–2000 season, while the Lakers had the best record that year (67–15), and won the NBA championship.

==== Move to Staples Center ====
In what was supposed to be a counter-move, the Coliseum Commission, the management entity that managed the Los Angeles Memorial Sports Arena and Coliseum, had planned to build a new 18,700-seat arena in the parking lot next to the Sports Arena that would have cost up to $94 million, that would have included 1,100 club seats, 84 luxury suites, and an on-site practice facility for the Clippers. However, those plans were scuttled once planning for Staples Center (two miles directly up the street from the Sports Arena) were taking place, and the Clippers decided to become a tenant at Staples.

In 1999, the Clippers joined the Lakers and Los Angeles Kings in the new Staples Center in Downtown Los Angeles. Also, because of the terms of its leasing agreement with Staples Center, the Kings and Lakers had scheduling priority over the Clippers, with the Clippers taking whatever dates that were available, including scheduling same-day Clipper-Laker and Clipper-King doubleheaders. However, in the years after, the Clippers' scheduling at Staples Center became gradually more favorable (especially given the popularity of the team in recent years) in their lease renewals in 2004 and 2013, with the team receiving increased profits, including more of a share of luxury suite and concession revenue. Since February 2011, the Clippers have sold out every regular season and postseason home game.

=== 2000–2009: Further struggles at Staples Center ===
The 2000–01 season brought changes. Derek Strong was sent to the Orlando Magic in exchange for Corey Maggette and the draft rights to Keyon Dooling. The Clippers' two draft picks that year were childhood friends from Illinois: high schooler Darius Miles (3rd overall pick) and Quentin Richardson (18th overall pick). The team became popular among fans with its high-flying style of basketball and the Clippers did improve slightly, registering a 31–51 record. The team also lead the NBA in bench-scoring, with 37 points per game.

To improve upon the previous season, the Clippers acquired high-scoring and rebounding power forward Elton Brand from the Chicago Bulls in exchange for the draft rights to Tyson Chandler. Brand earned a spot on the 2002 NBA Western Conference All-Star team as an injury replacement for Shaquille O'Neal. The Clippers contended for most of the season, but won only 3 of the last 12 games and finished 39–43, five games out of the playoffs. In order to seriously challenge for playoff contention in 2003, the franchise traded Miles to the Cavaliers for Andre Miller, who led the NBA in assists in 2001–02 with 11 per game. With a seasoned point guard in Miller, Lamar Odom at small forward, one of the league's best power forwards in Brand, and center Olowokandi, as well as having the best supporting cast in the league, the Clippers threatened a potential playoff run. However, poor team chemistry and injuries (the Clippers lost 293 man-games to injury), they finished with a disappointing 27–55 record. Coach Alvin Gentry was also replaced, with Dennis Johnson entering midway through the 2002–03 season.

After the dismal season prior, the team lost several of its core players, with Miller, Odom, Olowakandi, and forward Eric Piatkowski (who was one of the longest-tenured players in franchise history) departing via free agency prior to the 2003–04 season. The team opted to retain Brand and Maggette with long-term contracts. They, along with Richardson, made up one of the NBA's best high-scoring trios, with a combined 58 points per game. With new head coach Mike Dunleavy, Sr., they finished 28–54, due to inexperience and injuries. The following season again saw the team missing the playoffs, although, they posted a better record than the Lakers for the first time since 1993. Bobby Simmons, a former second-round pick, won the 2004–05 NBA Most Improved Player award after averaging 16 points, 6 rebounds, and 3 assists per game. As a result, Simmons signed a 5-year, $47 million deal with the Milwaukee Bucks. To counter Simmons' defection, the Clippers announced they would sign Cuttino Mobley. Mobley's contract was identical in length, but for five million less than Simmons', and marked the first significant free-agent signing from outside the organization since Walton in the late 1970s. The Clippers also completed the building of a practice facility (the first NBA practice facility within the four corners of the City of Los Angeles) in the Playa Vista development. Midway through the season, the Clippers traded Marko Jarić (in a sign and trade transaction) and Lionel Chalmers to the Minnesota Timberwolves in exchange for Sam Cassell and a lottery-protected first round pick in the 2006 NBA draft.

The 2005–06 season was a turning point for the team's image; marked by several wins over top teams, Brand's performances were greatly praised, and he was chosen for the All-Star Game. Many sports writers noted the team's improvement, especially after acquiring sharpshooter Vladimir Radmanović from the Seattle SuperSonics in exchange for big-man Chris Wilcox. While the team had a few stretches of poor play, they were able to maintain a solid record, including posting several winning streaks. They achieved their first winning record in 14 seasons, and clinched their first playoff spot since 1997. They also finished with a better record than the Lakers for the second straight year. By finishing sixth in the Western Conference, with a record of 47–35 (their highest finish since the team left Buffalo), they benefited from the current NBA playoff format of regular-season records taking precedence over winning the division, and secured home court advantage over the Denver Nuggets.

On April 22, 2006, the Clippers won their first NBA playoff game in 13 years. Two days later, they won their second playoff game, going 2–0 against an opponent for the first time in franchise history. They lost Game 3, won Game 4, and on May 1, they won Game 5 in Los Angeles. This would mark their first playoff series win since they moved from Buffalo. In the next round, the team faced the Phoenix Suns. After losing a close Game 1, they won Game 2, 122–97. The series shifted to Staples Center for Game 3, but the Suns won, 94–91. In Game 4, Brand posted 30 points, nine rebounds, and eight assists as the Clippers evened the series. In Game 5, Raja Bell made a key 3-pointer for the Suns with 1.1 seconds left in the first overtime to send the game into a second overtime. However, Phoenix won in double-overtime, 125–118. They bounced back with a series-saving 118–106 Game 6 win. Second-year defensive specialist Quinton Ross had a timely offensive game, scoring a then career-high 18 points. Brand had 30 points (his scoring average in this series), 12 rebounds, and five blocks. Corey Maggette came off the bench to score 25 points, with 7–8 shooting from the field, and 9–9 from the free-throw line. Kaman and Cassell each scored 15 points. However, the Clippers lost the seventh game, 127–107. General Manager (and Naismith Memorial Basketball Hall of Fame member) Elgin Baylor won the NBA Executive of the Year award for leading the Clippers' playoff run.

The 2006 off-season started as the team drafted Paul Davis in the second round of the 2006 NBA draft, as the 34th overall pick. The pick was acquired by the Clippers by way of a 2004 trade for Melvin Ely. The team also drafted Guillermo Diaz as the 52nd overall pick. While Davis signed with the team, Diaz decided to play overseas. However, the team still holds his draft rights. Meanwhile, in free agency, they signed Tim Thomas away from divisional Phoenix, in a four-year, $24 million deal. That was to counter the defection of Vladimir Radmanović to the Lakers in a similar deal. Radmanovic's contract lasted another year, but both players would make the same amount of money annually, which would be $6 million. Cassell (widely credited as the biggest reason for the Clippers' recent success) re-signed on a two-year, $13 million deal, while the team also signed veteran Aaron Williams to an undisclosed deal.

In September, the Clippers also announced a radio broadcast deal with KSPN-AM, the local ESPN Radio-operated outlet. Despite several additions, the team did not perform to expectations, with a lack of team chemistry and injuries to several key players, including Cassell, Thomas, and Kaman, forcing the team to sign journeymen Luke Jackson, Alvin Williams, and Doug Christie to help solidify the team's bench. The season disappointment extended as Shaun Livingston suffered a dislocated left knee in which he tore every ligament in his knee. This was one of the most devastating injuries that season, and considered one of the worst in league history. The extent of the injury was so severe, local news outlets such as KCBS-TV/KCAL-TV and KNBC-TV elected not to air the clip of the injury. According to the team's lead physician, Dr. Tony Daly, Livingston's prognosis for him to return to basketball activity was eight months (which was around the first week of the upcoming season) to a full calendar year. The Clippers finished the season 40–42, two games behind the eighth-seed, while the Lakers finished with a better record for the first time since the 2003–04 season. The Clippers received the 14th draft pick from the NBA lottery in the 2007 NBA Draft, selecting Al Thornton.

The 2007–08 season started off negatively, with Brand rupturing his left Achilles tendon. Brand missed most of the season, and the team struggled to stay competitive. Chris Kaman took advantage of a depleted roster by averaging 15.7 points and 12.7 rebounds per game, but was limited to playing 56 games, also due to various injuries. The Clippers ended the season 23–59, and the team aimed to rebuild for the following season. Both Brand and Maggette were allowed to depart, while ten players were acquired. Brand stated his desire to stay, but the contract faltered, allowing him to move to the Philadelphia 76ers. Baron Davis, a Los Angeles native and formerly of the Golden State Warriors, signed a five-year contract with the Clippers, worth an estimated $65 million. In the upcoming draft, the Clippers obtained the seventh pick, and selected Eric Gordon. They also selected DeAndre Jordan, who was picked 35th overall. Mike Taylor, the 55th overall pick, was acquired from the Portland Trail Blazers in exchange for a future second-round pick.

In July 2008, they acquired Marcus Camby from the Denver Nuggets in return for a $10 million trade exception and the choice to exchange second round picks with the Clippers in 2010. The Clippers also acquired guard Jason Hart from the Utah Jazz, in exchange for guard Brevin Knight, and signed Ricky Davis to a one-year deal. They continued an active off-season by re-signing former Clippers player Brian Skinner in July, while trading for Steve Novak. The team would also sign Jason Williams to a one-year deal. However, just prior to the start of training camp in September, Williams announced his retirement. Other mid-season acquisitions came in the form of Zach Randolph and Mardy Collins, who arrived from the New York Knicks in exchange for Tim Thomas and Cuttino Mobley. This trade made Kaman the sole member still on the team from their playoff run two years prior.

In October 2008, Baylor ended his 22-year reign as vice president and general manager of basketball operations. It remains one of the longest tenures in professional sports history. The Clippers indicated that Baylor had retired from his post, and as a result, head coach Mike Dunleavy, Sr. assumed the role of General Manager, while director of player personnel Neil Olshey was promoted to assistant general manager. However, several other reports indicated Baylor had been fired or resigned, and when questioned, Baylor responded he had been advised by his attorneys not to comment on the matter. This prompted speculation that the team and Baylor were in negotiations to work out a settlement agreement for his departure, with Baylor reportedly working without a formal contract since the early 1990s.

The 2008–09 season ended with the team 14th in the Western Conference, with a record of 19–63. They were then awarded the first overall pick in the 2009 NBA draft.

=== 2009–2011: The arrival of Blake Griffin and steady improvement ===
With the first overall pick, the team selected Blake Griffin. To clear a spot in the lineup for him, they traded Zach Randolph to Memphis for Quentin Richardson. Richardson was then traded to the Minnesota Timberwolves for Sebastian Telfair, Craig Smith, and Mark Madsen.

Griffin immediately impressed in training camp and preseason. On October 23, he broke his kneecap during the Clippers' final exhibition game against the New Orleans Hornets, following a dunk. Initially, the Clippers' stated that he only had a sore left knee, which would make him questionable for the season opener the following night, before they revealed the break. The injury sidelined Griffin for the entire season.

On February 4, 2010, head coach Mike Dunleavy resigned, and Kim Hughes was named interim coach. Dunleavy retained his front-office title and duties for just over a month, but on March 10 he was fired as General Manager, being replaced by Neil Olshey. Dunleavy received the news of his dismissal from the internet, as well as friends and reporters calling his cell phone. The Los Angeles Times reported that Dunleavy had filed for arbitration and that the Clippers had cut off his salary, even though his guaranteed contract did not end until after the 2010–11 season. Although the Clippers saw minor improvement, finishing with ten more wins at 29–53, Hughes was fired as head coach at the end of the season.

In July, former Chicago Bulls coach Vinny Del Negro was hired as the next head coach. In August, the team introduced new uniform designs at a photoshoot, at the team's practice facility. Griffin and DeAndre Jordan, who saw significant improvement in his two years with the team, modeled the new uniforms, which were re-designed for the first time since the 2000–01 season. The Clippers' primary and secondary logos, which are modifications of the previous ones, were introduced to the public weeks earlier, on the night of the 2010 NBA draft, where the Clippers selected Al-Farouq Aminu eighth overall.

With an improved Gordon, stalwart Kaman, rookie Aminu, starting center Jordan, a re-energized Baron Davis, and the debut of Griffin, the Clippers had high hopes for the season. However, they started slowly, losing ten of the first 11 games, with Davis and Kaman out with injuries. However, the Clippers showed strength when three of their first four wins came from the top teams in the Western Conference. Griffin got off to a strong start, drawing increased media attention in Clippers games and boosting ratings of local broadcasts of Clippers games. Griffin was chosen as a Western Conference Reserve in the 2011 NBA All-Star Game, a rare honor for a rookie, the first chosen by the coaches for the game since Tim Duncan in 1997. He also won the NBA Sprite Slam Dunk Contest, and was named the Rookie of the Year as the team finished with a record of 32–50. As the trade deadline approached, the Clippers sent Baron Davis along with their 2011 first-round draft pick to the Cleveland Cavaliers for Mo Williams and Jamario Moon. The pick eventually became the number one overall pick, which the Cavaliers used to select Kyrie Irving.

=== 2011–2017: Arrival of Chris Paul and "Lob City" ===
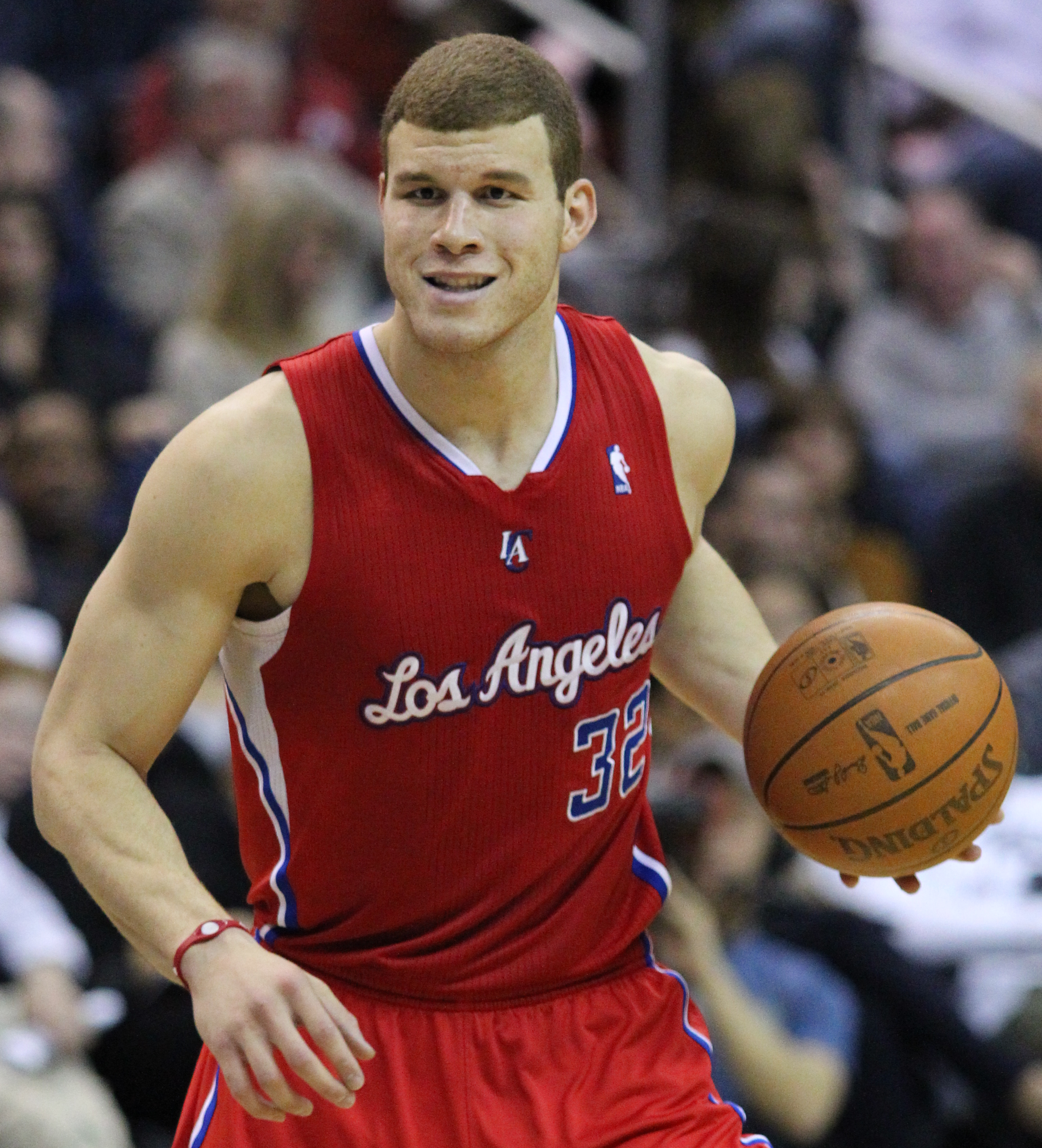
Blake Griffin

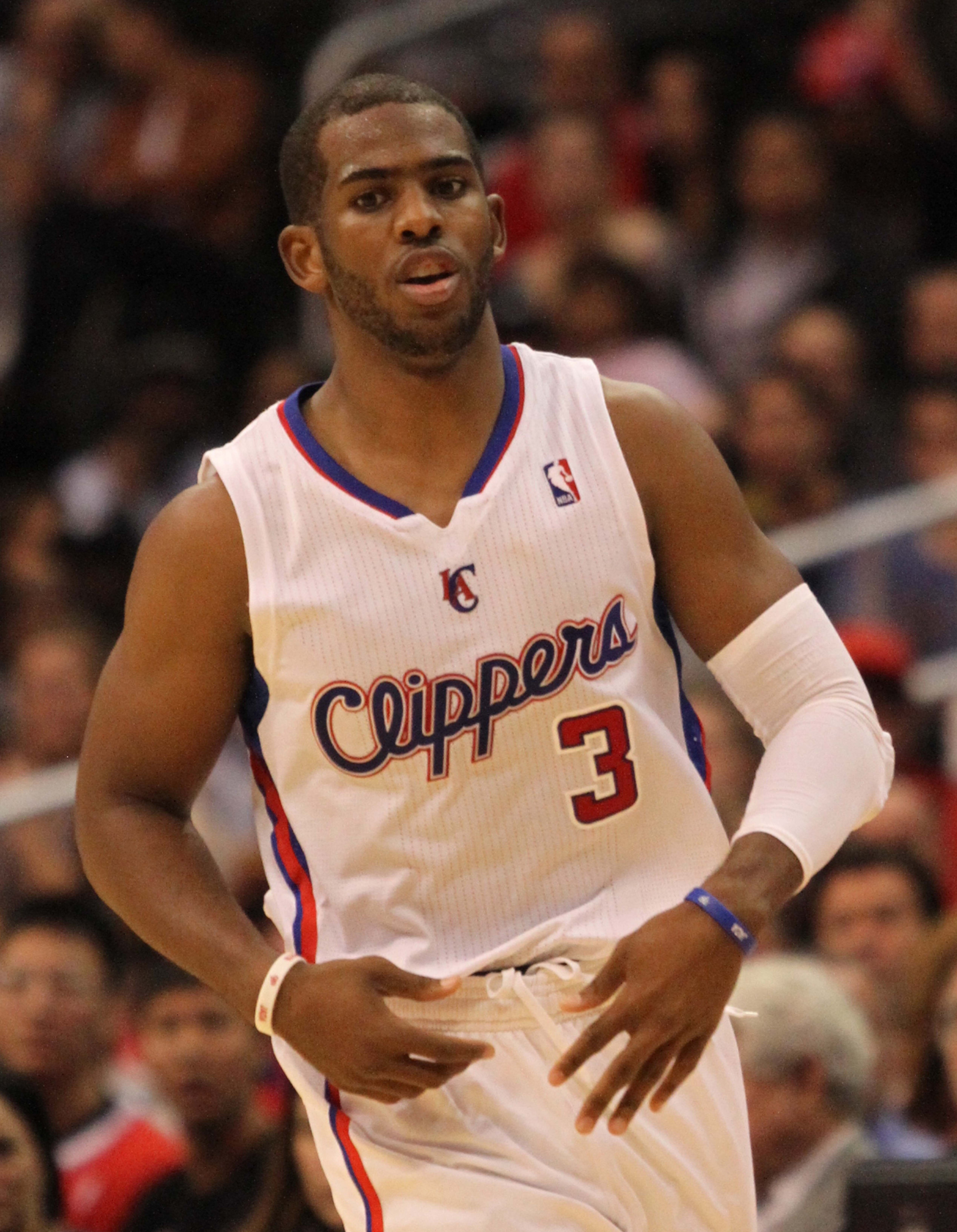
Chris Paul

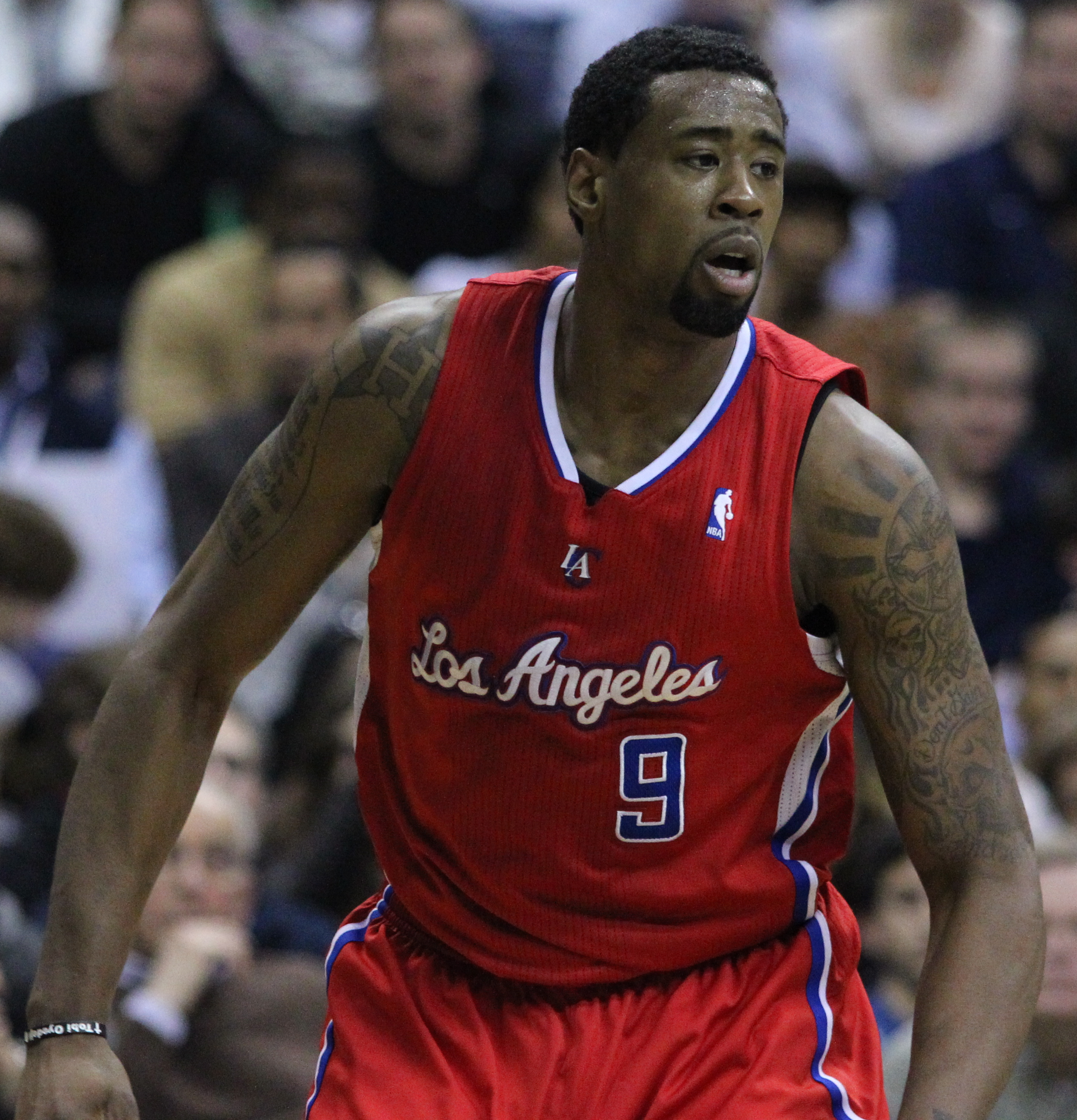
DeAndre Jordan

In December 2011, the Clippers signed Caron Butler to a $24 million deal and claimed veteran point guard Chauncey Billups three days later. On December 14, they traded Eric Gordon, Chris Kaman, Al-Farouq Aminu and Minnesota's 2012 first-round pick acquired in 2005 for New Orleans Hornets' four-time all-star Chris Paul. Paul had previously almost been traded to the Los Angeles Lakers, but NBA commissioner David Stern had vetoed the trade (the NBA was owner of the Hornets at the time). Paul and Griffin were selected as starters for the Western Conference team in the 2012 NBA All-Star Game, the first time in franchise history the team had two All-Star starters in the same year.

The team gained the nickname "Lob City" due to a comment made by Griffin during the Clippers Media Day when the announcement of Chris Paul's trade reached the team. Griffin, after being told the news by Jordan, declared, "Yeah! It's going to be lob city!"

In February 2012, the Clippers signed Kenyon Martin. An 11-year NBA veteran and former NBA All-Star (2004), Martin joined the Clippers after signing with the Xinjiang Guanghui Flying Tigers of the Chinese Basketball Association the previous summer. On February 6, 2012, during a game against the Orlando Magic, Billups tore his Achilles tendon and missed the remainder of the season. In March 2012, Nick Young joined the Clippers as part of a three-team trade with the Washington Wizards and the Denver Nuggets. He became the eighth player to debut in the 2011–12 season.

After a stretch that saw the Clippers lose 12 of 19 games after Billups's season-ending injury, with rumors of Vinny Del Negro's career as head coach of the Clippers possibly coming to an abrupt end, Los Angeles went on a tear. The Clippers won 12 of their next 14 games, including road wins over the defending champions Dallas Mavericks and the Western Conference-leading Oklahoma City Thunder, clinching their fifth playoff berth since their 1976 conference semifinals loss to the Boston Celtics (the last time they made the playoffs as the Buffalo Braves) before a dominating home win over the Oklahoma City Thunder on April 16, 2012. It was their third win in four regular-season games against the Thunder. Chris Paul's push for the NBA Most Valuable Player Award was at its peak, and the 2011–12 season was the first time the Clippers were in the playoffs since 2005–06 season.

In their first playoff game, the Clippers rallied from a 27-point deficit against the Grizzlies to win 99–98 in one of the biggest rallies in playoff history. They led the series 3–1, then lost two straight, before coming back to win Game 7 in Memphis 82–72, becoming the sixth NBA road team to win Game 7 after leading series 3–1, and prevail to the second round. The Clippers relied on their bench during that game, and they came through, scoring all but two of their points in the fourth quarter. In the second round of the playoffs, the team was swept by the San Antonio Spurs. The following off-season, GM Neil Olshey reached an agreement to become General Manager of the Portland Trail Blazers. Olshey was replaced by Gary Sacks. On draft night, the team re-acquired Lamar Odom from the Dallas Mavericks as part of a four-team deal that also sent Mo Williams and Furkan Aldemir, their 2012 draftee, to the Utah Jazz and Houston Rockets, respectively. The team then sent Reggie Evans to the Brooklyn Nets for the right to swap second-round draft picks with the Nets in the 2016 NBA draft. On the same day, the Clippers signed free agent Jamal Crawford, formerly of the Portland Trail Blazers, and re-signed Billups to a one-year deal. The franchise then rounded out its roster for the upcoming season with Grant Hill, Ryan Hollins, and Ronny Turiaf, while signing Matt Barnes to a one-year deal early in the season.

On November 29, 2012, public address announcer David Courtney died in hospital, and was replaced by former Clippers and current Los Angeles Dodgers PA announcer, Eric Smith. On December 15, with a 111–85 victory over the Milwaukee Bucks, the Clippers recorded their record ninth consecutive win, breaking their previous franchise record (in Los Angeles) of eight wins set in the 1991–92 season. On December 21, with a 97–85 win over the Sacramento Kings, they notched their twelfth consecutive victory, breaking their previous 11-game streak as the Buffalo Braves in the 1974–75 season. On December 30, the Clippers recorded a team-record 17th straight win against the Utah Jazz, beating them 107–96. The win also made the Clippers the third team in NBA history to record an undefeated month ending the month of December 16–0. The streak ended when they lost to the Denver Nuggets on January 2, 2013.

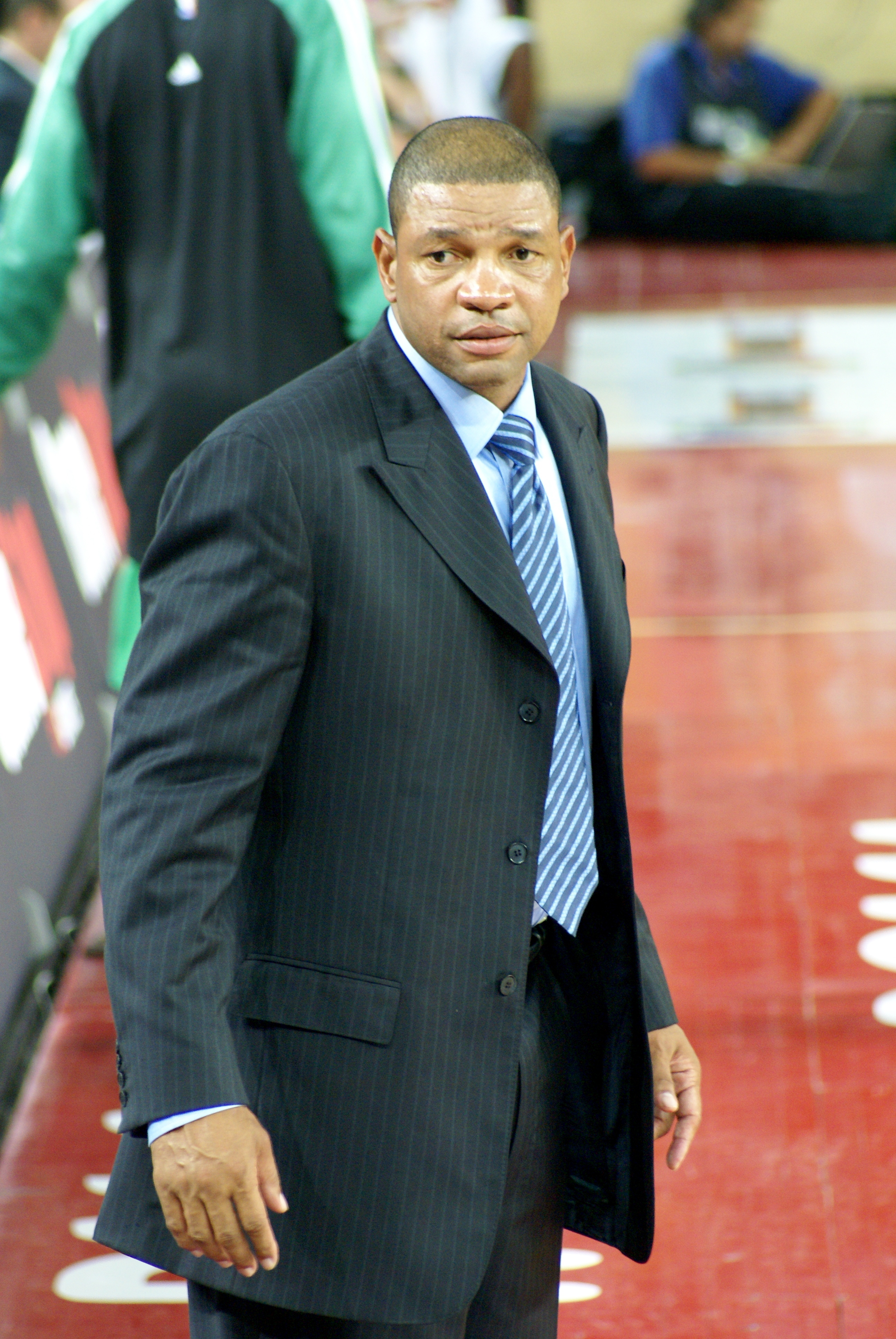
Doc Rivers became head coach during the 2013 off-season.

On January 9, 2013, with a 99–93 victory over the Dallas Mavericks, the Clippers recorded another franchise record with their 13th straight home victory. On January 12, the Clippers 13 game home win streak came to an end with a 104–101 loss to the Orlando Magic. A 126–101 victory over the Phoenix Suns saw the Clippers reach the 50-win mark for the first time in franchise history, breaking their previous mark of 49 from 1974–75, when they were in Buffalo. On April 7, with a 109–95 victory over the Lakers, they swept the LA season series, and clinched their first division title in franchise history. They would finish the season with a 56–26 record, and entered the playoffs as the fourth seed, to once again face the fifth seeded Memphis Grizzlies. The Clippers would go up 2–0 early in the series after a buzzer beater by Chris Paul in game 2. After being up 2–0 in the series, the Clippers would lose 4 games in a row to be eliminated the first round. This caused the team to not renew Vinny Del Negro's contract as head coach, and acquired Doc Rivers from the Boston Celtics. The deal was announced to have included two future first-round draft picks, in addition to an anti-trade clause preventing the Clippers and Celtics from engaging in further transactions amongst each other, including the exchanging of players, for the duration of the 2013–14 season.

On July 3, 2013, the Clippers traded Eric Bledsoe and Caron Butler to the Phoenix Suns for Jared Dudley and JJ Redick (from the Milwaukee Bucks). The Clippers and Suns also sent a second-round pick each to the Bucks. On July 7, the team re-signed Barnes, Paul, and Ryan Hollins. Paul's deal was for 5 years, worth around $105.3 million. The team also signed Darren Collison to fill the back-up point guard role, replacing Bledsoe and free agent Chauncey Billups, who signed with the Detroit Pistons. On August 28, the Clippers signed free agent power forward Antawn Jamison to a one-year deal worth the veteran minimum. Jamison only appeared in 22 games, and was eventually traded to the Atlanta Hawks on February 20, 2014, in exchange for the draft rights to Cenk Akyol. On December 19, 2013, the Clippers signed free agent small forward Stephen Jackson. Jackson also appeared sporadically, and was eventually waived on January 7, 2014. On January 16, the Clippers signed free agent small forward Hedo Türkoğlu, while also acquiring both Glen Davis and Danny Granger for the remainder of 2013–14 season. On March 6, the Clippers defeated their crosstown rivals by 48 points 142–94, the most lopsided victory ever for the Clippers' franchise, and the most one-sided loss in Lakers history. On April 15, the Clippers broke the franchise record of wins with 57. In the playoffs, they defeated the Warriors in seven games before falling again, this time to the Thunder, in six games in the second round.

==== Donald Sterling controversy ====
On April 25, 2014, entertainment news website TMZ released a taped conversation in which team owner Donald Sterling—who had a history of accusations of racist behavior against African Americans and Latinos dating back to the 1990s—reprimanded V. Stiviano (of African American and Mexican heritage, who had reportedly been dating Sterling while he was estranged from his wife) for posting an Instagram photo featuring her, former Los Angeles Lakers point guard Magic Johnson, and another woman. Sterling stated that it bothered him that she had "broadcast that [she is] associating with black people", and that he did not want Stiviano to bring them to the team's games. The remarks in the tape caused public backlash (including condemnations from many players, with Johnson, Kareem Abdul-Jabbar, Charles Barkley, Shaquille O'Neal, LeBron James, and Kobe Bryant all voicing their disapproval); several sponsors also severed ties with the team, among them Kia Motors (for whom Griffin serves as its television spokesperson), State Farm Insurance, and Virgin America. Threats of boycotts against the Clippers were also considered, with the team itself briefly contemplating one at the April 27 playoff game against the Golden State Warriors (the fourth game in the team's first round playoff series). They opted to conduct a silent protest instead, by wearing their shirts inside-out, obscuring team logos.

On April 29, the NBA issued Sterling a lifetime ban from the organization after a league investigation into the recording confirmed that he was the one conversing with Stiviano. The league also issued a $2.5 million fine against Sterling (the highest allowable by the NBA) and barred him from attending games or practices involving any NBA team; being present in any Clippers office or facility; and from participating in any team business, player personnel decisions or league activity. NBA commissioner Adam Silver stated in a press conference regarding the decision that he will try to force Sterling to sell the Clippers, which would require the consent of three-quarters of the league's 29 other team owners. Silver later announced that the NBA would appoint a CEO to run the team. Before the ban was issued, Sterling told Fox News contributor Jim Gray that he had no plans to sell the team. The NBA installed former Citigroup and Time Warner chairman Richard Parsons as the interim CEO of the team on May 9, prior to allowing Steve Ballmer, a former CEO of Microsoft, to purchase the team for $2 billion. To buy the team, Ballmer reportedly beat out other candidates, including Eric Piatkowski and his group, Oprah Winfrey, Floyd Mayweather, Magic Johnson, as well as a group of crowdfunders. The team's sale price, which was four times the expected purchase-evaluated price, prompted speculation that Ballmer aimed to relocate the team to Seattle, his hometown. He had previously been a part of an ownership group that had unsuccessfully attempted to move the Sacramento Kings to that city, but later stated no intention to relocate the team.

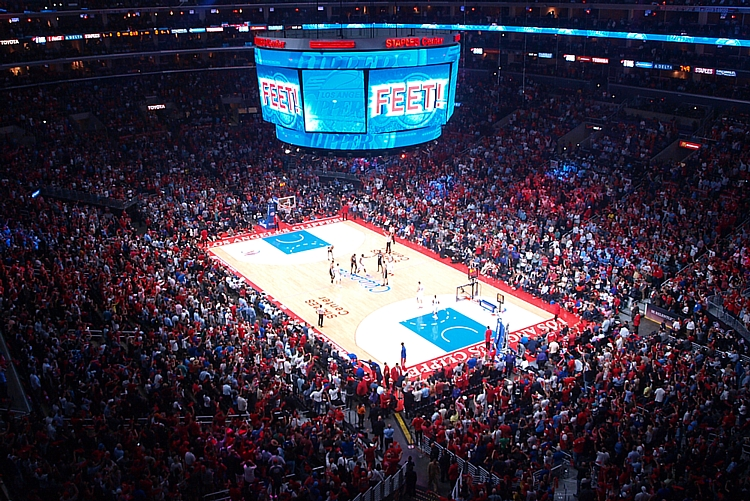
The Clippers hosting the San Antonio Spurs in Game 5 of the 2015 NBA playoffs first-round series

On August 12, 2014, Ballmer officially took control of the team following an order by a California court that confirmed the sale from Shelly Sterling to Ballmer. As part of the deal, Shelly received the titles of "Owner Emeritus" and "Clippers' Number 1 Fan", as well as ten tickets in sections 101 or 111 for all Clippers games, two courtside tickets for all games in Los Angeles, six parking spots in Lot C for each game, 12 VIP passes that include access to the Lexus Club, Arena Club, or Chairman's Lounge and Media room or equivalent, for each Staples games, three championship rings following any Clippers title, and will run a charitable foundation. The deal also included a stipulation that Steve Ballmer would keep the Clippers in Los Angeles. On November 6, the team hired its first major female executive as former Auto Club Speedway president Gillian Zucker was hired as the Clippers' president of business operations. Zucker became one of two women to serve in an executive capacity in any of the four major professional sports leagues; the other being Jeanie Buss, president and part-owner of the crosstown Lakers.

==== 2014–2017: Final seasons of Lob City ====
The Clippers' first regular season under Ballmer's co-ownership ended with a 56–26 record and the third seed in the Western Conference going into the 2015 playoffs. They met the defending NBA champion San Antonio Spurs, winning the series in the seventh game on a game-winning shot by Paul with one second left. In the next series against the second-seeded Houston Rockets, they took a 3–1 series lead that included 25 and 33-point wins in games three and four, respectively. However, Houston won the final three games to eliminate Los Angeles. In the off-season, the Clippers acquired Lance Stephenson, Wesley Johnson, and Paul Pierce while re-signing Austin Rivers. Griffin missed half of the season and the Clippers finished with the fourth playoff seed before being then eliminated in the first round of the 2016 playoffs by the fifth-seeded Portland Trail Blazers.

The Clippers finished the 2016–17 season with a 51–31 record, the team's fifth straight 50-win season, despite injuries to both Griffin and Paul during the regular season. The Clippers won their last seven games and earned the fourth playoff seed by defeating the Sacramento Kings in the final game of the season. The Clippers faced the Utah Jazz in the first round of the playoffs, but lost in seven games. Paul Pierce retired after the season.

=== 2017–2019: Rebuild ===
In preparation for a rebuild, the Clippers brought in two-time Executive Of The Year winner Jerry West to serve as their special consultant; West was the architect behind the dynasties of the 2000 to 2002 Los Angeles Lakers and mid to late 2010s Golden State Warriors, and had helped to establish the Memphis Grizzlies as a relevant playoff contender. On June 28, 2017, Chris Paul was sent to the Houston Rockets in a sign-and-trade in exchange for Lou Williams, Patrick Beverley, Montrezl Harrell, Sam Dekker, Darrun Hilliard, DeAndre Liggins, Kyle Wiltjer, a future first-round pick, and cash considerations. The team retained Griffin and acquired Italian wing Danilo Gallinari in a three-team trade with the Denver Nuggets and Atlanta Hawks. Due to injuries to Griffin and Gallinari and no serious depth on the roster, the team was struggling by the 2018 trade deadline and traded Griffin to the Detroit Pistons in exchange for Tobias Harris, Avery Bradley, Boban Marjanović, a protected first-round pick in 2018, and a second-round pick in 2019. With the added depth, they finished with a winning record of 42–40 but missed the playoffs for the first time since 2011.

In the 2018 NBA draft, the team were awarded the 12th and 13th overall picks, and selected Miles Bridges and Jerome Robinson, respectively. They then traded Bridges and two future second-round picks on draft night to Charlotte for Shai Gilgeous-Alexander. Austin Rivers was traded to the Washington Wizards in exchange for Marcin Gortat, while long-time Clipper DeAndre Jordan, who had been with the team since 2008, opted out of his contract and became a free agent. Despite the departure of Griffin and Jordan for the 2018–19 season, the Clippers clinched a playoff berth and finished the regular season with a 48–34 record. The team faced the defending two-time NBA champion Golden State Warriors in the first round, losing in six games.

=== 2019–2026: The Kawhi Leonard era ===
==== 2019–2024: The Paul George/Kawhi Leonard duo ====
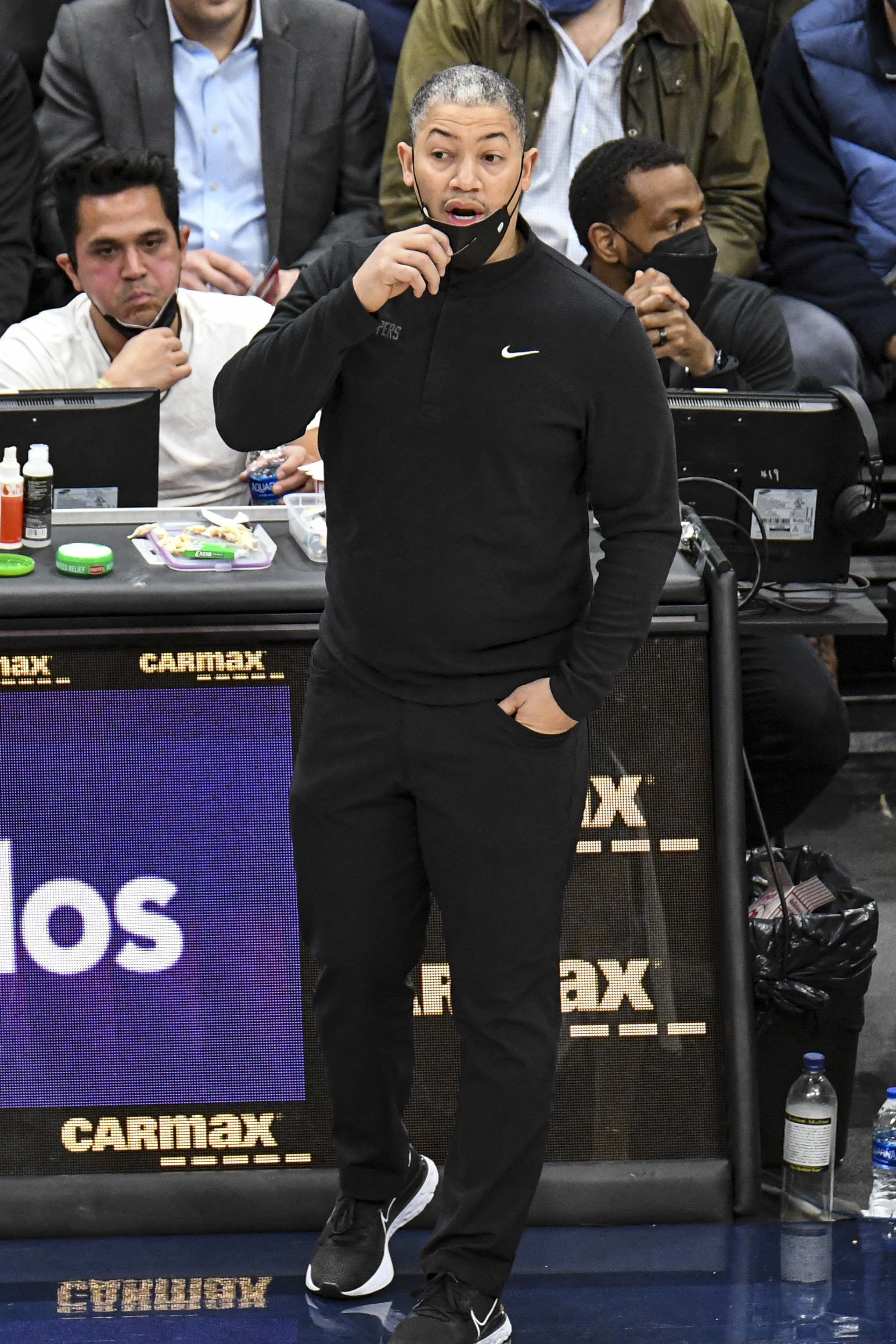
Tyronn Lue has coached the Clippers since 2019

In the 2019 off-season, Kawhi Leonard opted out of his final year on his contract with the Toronto Raptors to become one of the top free agents. Leonard chose to sign with the Clippers when the team agreed to trade for the Oklahoma City Thunder's Paul George. For George, the Clippers traded Shai Gilgeous-Alexander, Danilo Gallinari, four unprotected first-round picks, a protected first-round pick, and two pick swaps.

Following the suspension of the 2019–20 NBA season, the Clippers were one of the 22 teams invited to the NBA Bubble to participate in the final 8 games of the regular season. They finished the year with a 49–23 record as the Western Conferences second seed. Despite high expectations, the Clippers failed to win their first conference semifinals series when they were eliminated by the Denver Nuggets in seven games. The defeat marked the second time that the Clippers lost the conference semifinals after taking a 3–1 series lead. A week later, Ballmer announced that Rivers stepped down as head coach in a mutual decision. Rivers was succeeded by Tyronn Lue.

Despite losing Leonard to injury during the 2021 playoffs, the Clippers defeated the top-seeded Utah Jazz in the semifinals, leading them to their first Western Conference finals appearance in franchise history. The Clippers lost the conference finals in six games to the Phoenix Suns, preventing them from reaching their first NBA Finals.

On September 17, 2021, ground was broken for Intuit Dome, which will be the Clipper's home arena from the 2024–25 season. Due to Kawhi's injury during the playoffs, Leonard missed the entire 2021–22 season. In August 2021, the Clippers traded Patrick Beverley, Rajon Rondo, and a 2025 pick to the Memphis Grizzlies for Eric Bledsoe, who would be dealt in February 2022 with Justise Winslow and Keon Johnson for Norman Powell and Robert Covington. The Clippers ended the season 42–40, qualifying for the play-in game, but would not make it out due to losses to Minnesota and New Orleans.

In the next season, the Clippers acquired former MVP Russell Westbrook and former All-NBA guard John Wall via free agency. Wall would later be dealt for Eric Gordon as part of a three-team deal. The Clippers would finish the season 44–38 and make the playoffs but be eliminated in the first round due to injuries to Kawhi Leonard and Paul George.

Near the start of the 2023–24 season, the Clippers traded Marcus Morris Sr., Kenyon Martin Jr., Nicolas Batum and Robert Covington to the Philadelphia 76ers for P. J. Tucker, Filip Petrušev and former MVP James Harden. In the Clippers' final season in the Crypto.com Arena, they would start off the season slow, but when Terance Mann replaced Westbrook in the starting lineup, the Clippers went on a roll. They clinched a playoff spot on April 11, 2024, and finished as the fourth seed in the Western Conference with a 51–31 record. The Clippers were defeated in six games by the Dallas Mavericks.

==== Move to Intuit Dome ====
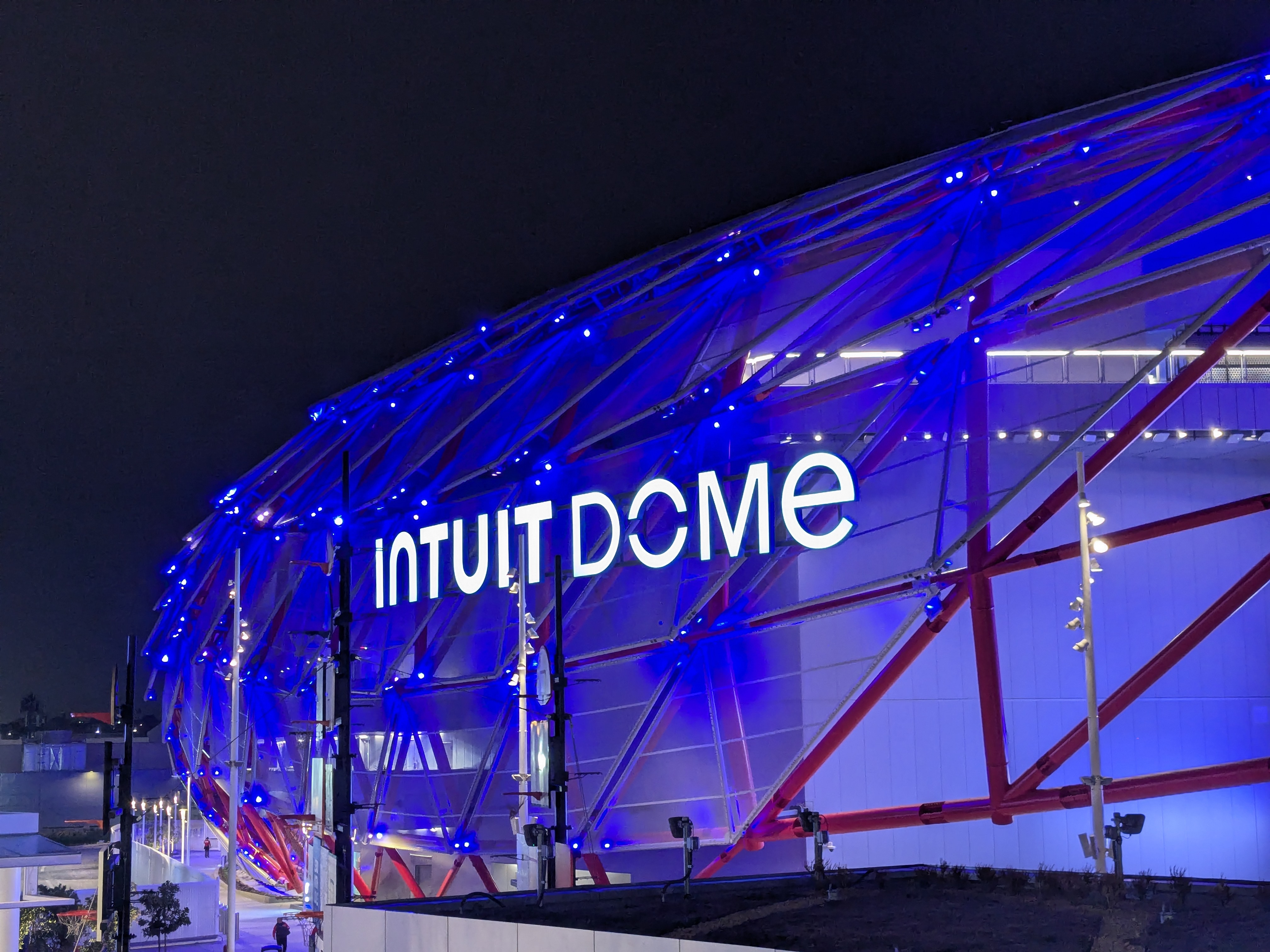
Intuit Dome became the home of the Clippers in 2024

On June 15, 2017, the Clippers and the city of Inglewood entered into an exclusive negotiating agreement in which the team built a new privately funded arena, Inglewood Basketball and Entertainment Center, by 2024, when the Clippers' lease with Crypto.com Arena expired. The arena is located at Century Boulevard between Yukon and Prairie Avenues, directly south of SoFi Stadium, the home of the Los Angeles Rams and Los Angeles Chargers of the National Football League. The arena also houses a practice facility and team headquarters for the Clippers, as the team's former practice facility in Los Angeles' Playa Vista neighborhood is still owned by the Sterling Family Trust, and is leased back to the team. The Inglewood city council unanimously voted for the agreement in which a subsidiary of the Clippers purchased 22 acres covering four large city blocks in what is largely a lower-class/lower-middle-class residential neighborhood (Century to the north, 104th Street to the south, Doty to the east, and Prairie to the west) to build the new facility.

The planned arena was met with immediate opposition from the nearby Forum and its operator, the Madison Square Garden Company (parent company of the New York Knicks), as they accused both the Clippers and the Inglewood city government of "backroom dealing" and the fear that a new Clippers' arena would siphon events from the recently renovated sports arena-turned-concert venue. In March 2020, Steve Ballmer, owner of the Clippers, reached an agreement with the Madison Square Garden Company to buy The Forum, eliminating any opposition related to the construction of the Clippers' new arena.

On July 25, 2019, the Clippers released images of the proposed arena with the construction planned to begin in 2021 and completed in fall 2024 following the expiration of the Clippers' lease with the Staples Center. On September 17, 2021, the Clippers unveiled the first renditions of the new arena with an expected cost of up to $2 billion. The team also revealed the arena's name as Intuit Dome through a 23-year naming rights deal with Intuit worth $500 million.

==== 2024–2025: Departure of Paul George ====
In the 2024–25 off-season, the Clippers, now with a new home arena and branding, lost Paul George and Russell Westbrook to the Philadelphia 76ers and Denver Nuggets, respectively, and re-signed James Harden.

After missing the first 34 games of the season due to injury, Kawhi Leonard returned to play in January 2025. James Harden represented the Clippers at the All-Star Game.

==== 2025–2026: Salary cap circumvention ====
In September 2025, Pablo Torre reported on his podcast that the Clippers and Ballmer used now-bankrupt environmental company Aspiration as a means of circumventing the NBA salary cap. Torre reported that Kawhi Leonard had signed a $28 million "no-show" endorsement deal with Aspiration that required no action on Leonard's part, other than remaining a Clipper. Ballmer had also invested $50 million into Aspiration, and former anonymous employees of the company alleged that Leonard's deal was a means of paying him extra under the table. A follow-up report by Torre cited documents that Clippers minority owner Dennis J. Wong invested $2 million in Aspiration after the already-struggling company was late on a $1.75 million payment to Leonard, which the company marked as "critical." John Karalis of the Boston Sports Journal later reported that Leonard also received an additional $20 million in Aspiration company stock, bringing Leonard's total promised compensation from the company to $48 million.

The NBA responded by announcing it was investigating the matter. The Clippers immediately denied the allegations, calling them "absurd" and "flat-out wrong" in multiple team statements. Ballmer gave an interview to ESPN's Ramona Shelburne on September 4, 2025, claiming that the team had introduced Leonard to Aspiration after signing a $300 million sponsorship agreement with the company, which is allowed under NBA rules, but had no further involvement in any endorsement deals the parties signed. He claimed that he had no knowledge of the terms of the contract Leonard had signed, and stated he was a victim of fraud by Aspiration, expressing "anger" and "sadness" for his employees.

On September 2, 2026, the NBA announced that it had determined that the Clippers' dealings with Leonard had circumvented the cap, and levied a series of substantial penalties against the team and certain individuals:

- The Clippers were fined $30 million and were stripped of their first-round picks in each draft from 2029–2033.
- Owner Steve Ballmer was suspended from all league and team activities for one year.
- President of business operations Gillian Zucker was suspended without pay for one year.
- President of basketball operations Lawrence Frank was suspended without pay for 6 months.
- Leonard was fined $700,000.
- Dennis Robertson, who was Leonard's business manager at the time Leonard signed with the Clippers, was banned from conducting businees with NBA teams or their affiliates for 5 years.
- The Clippers organization and personnel are subject to a 5-year compliance program under league supervision.

On September 14, upon conclusion of investigation involving Leonard, he was traded back to the Raptors in exchange for Brandon Ingram, Gradey Dick and five draft picks. Meanwhile, trial lawyer John Gibson was appointed as the interim governor and CEO of the team in Ballmer's stead on September 21; Gibson named general manager Trent Redden as the interim president of basketball operations in Frank's stead two days later, with senior vice president and assistant general manager Mark Hughes assuming Redden's role as interim general manager.

== Rivalries ==
=== Golden State Warriors ===
The Clippers-Warriors rivalry peaked between 2012 and 2015, fueled by geographical proximity, similar Pacific Division timelines, and intense physical play. Highlighted by a 2014 playoff clash, the feud was marked by chippy regular-season games, on-court scuffles, and animosity between stars like Blake Griffin and Andrew Bogut. The Warriors lead the all-time series.

=== Los Angeles Lakers ===
The rivalry between the Clippers and the Los Angeles Lakers is unique, as they were the only two NBA teams to share an arena, Crypto.com Arena, but since the Clippers' move to Intuit Dome in 2024, no NBA teams share an arena. It is also one of only two intra-city rivalries in the NBA, the other being the crosstown rivalry between the New York Knicks and Brooklyn Nets.

Los Angeles fans have historically favored the Lakers. Some contend that the term rivalry is inaccurate due to the Lakers' historical success and the Clippers' lack thereof.

== Season-by-season record ==
List of the last five seasons completed by the Clippers. For the full season-by-season history, see List of Los Angeles Clippers seasons.

Note: GP = Games played, W = Wins, L = Losses, W–L% = Winning percentage

Season	GP	W	L	W–L%	Finish	Playoffs
2021–22	82	42	40	.512	3rd, Pacific	Did not qualify
2022–23	82	44	38	.537	3rd, Pacific	Lost in first round, 1–4 (Suns)
2023–24	82	51	31	.622	1st, Pacific	Lost in first round, 2–4 (Mavericks)
2024–25	82	50	32	.610	2nd, Pacific	Lost in first round, 3–4 (Nuggets)
2025–26	82	42	40	.512	3rd, Pacific	Did not qualify

== Home arenas ==
- Buffalo Memorial Auditorium (1970–1978)
  - Maple Leaf Gardens (occasional games, 1971–1975)
- San Diego Sports Arena (1978–1984)
- Los Angeles Memorial Sports Arena (1984–1999)
  - Arrowhead Pond of Anaheim (occasional games, 1994–1999)
- Crypto.com Arena (1999–2024)
- Intuit Dome (2024–present)

== Logos and uniforms ==
Previous logos of the Los Angeles Clippers
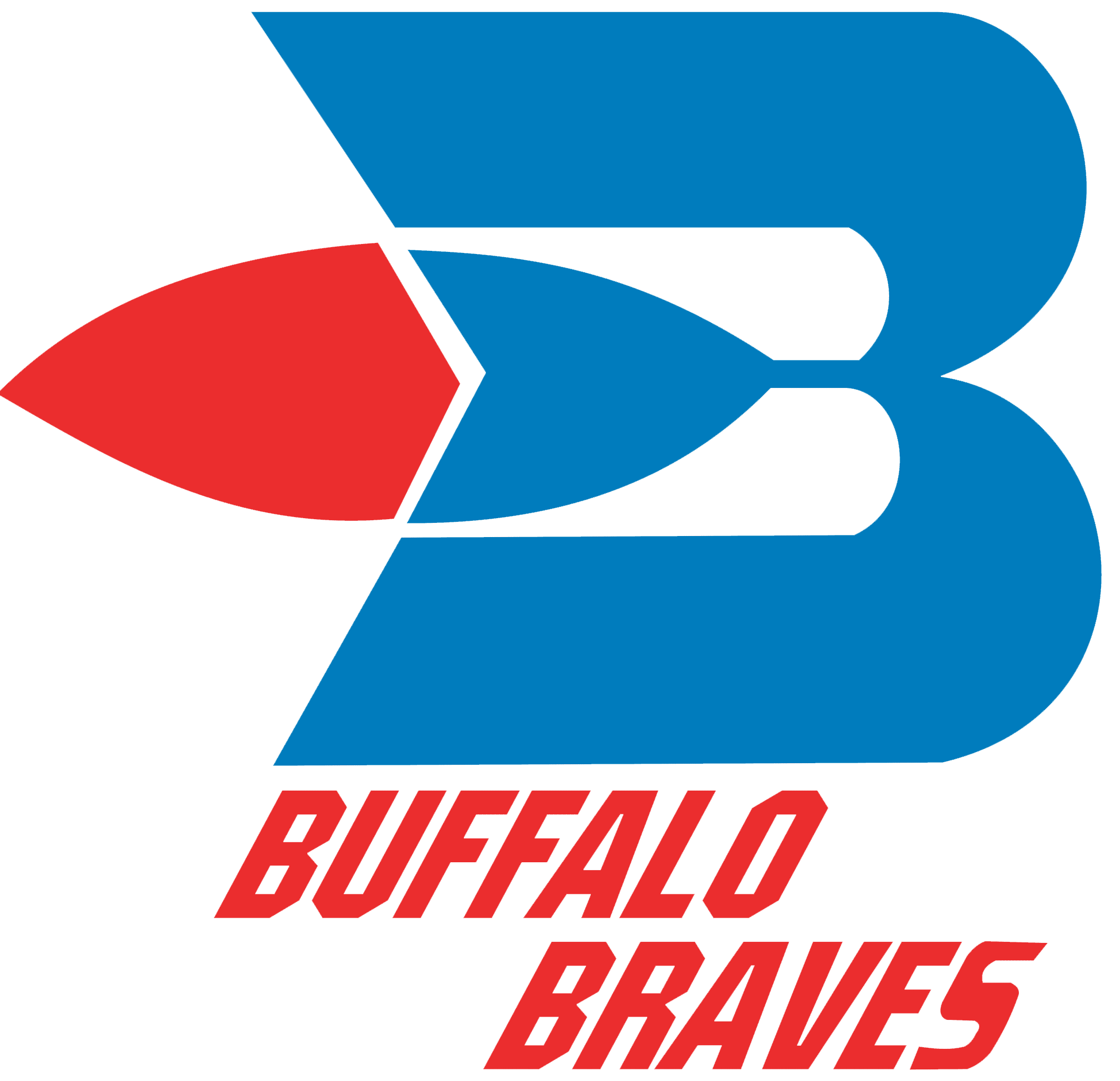
Primary logo, red and blue version, 1972 to 1978

Primary logo, black and orange version, 1972 to 1978

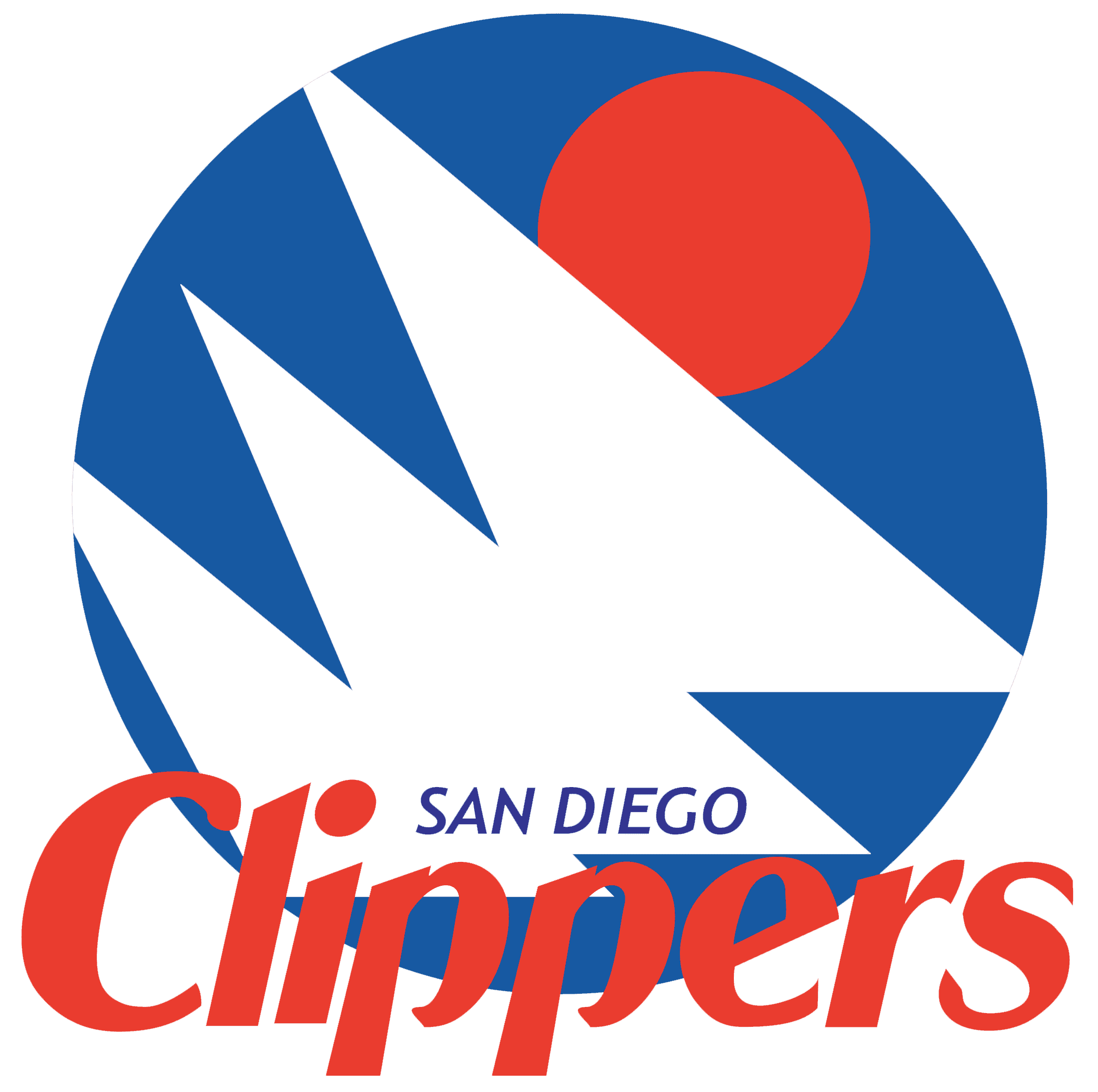
Primary logo, 1979 to 1982

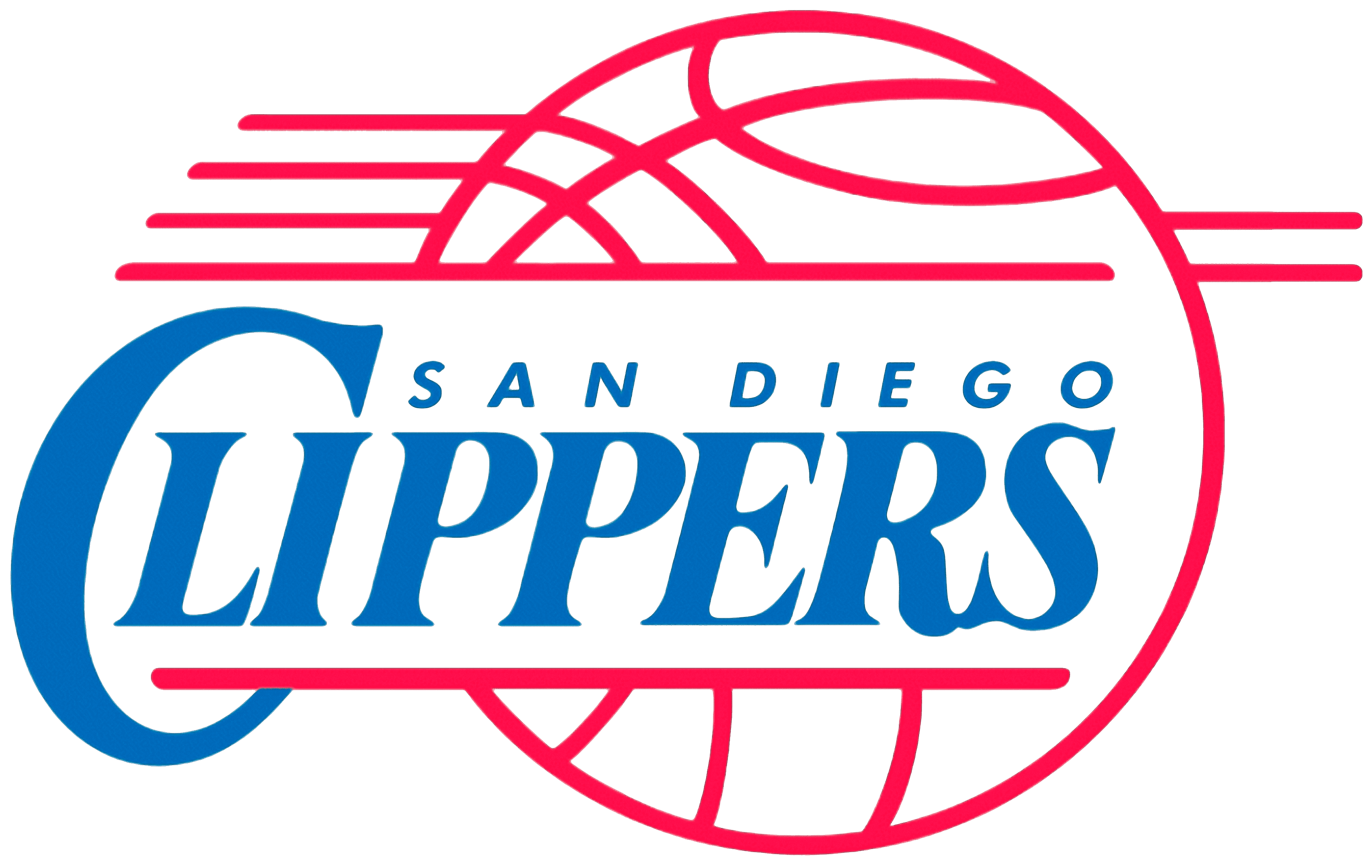
Primary logo, 1983 to 1984

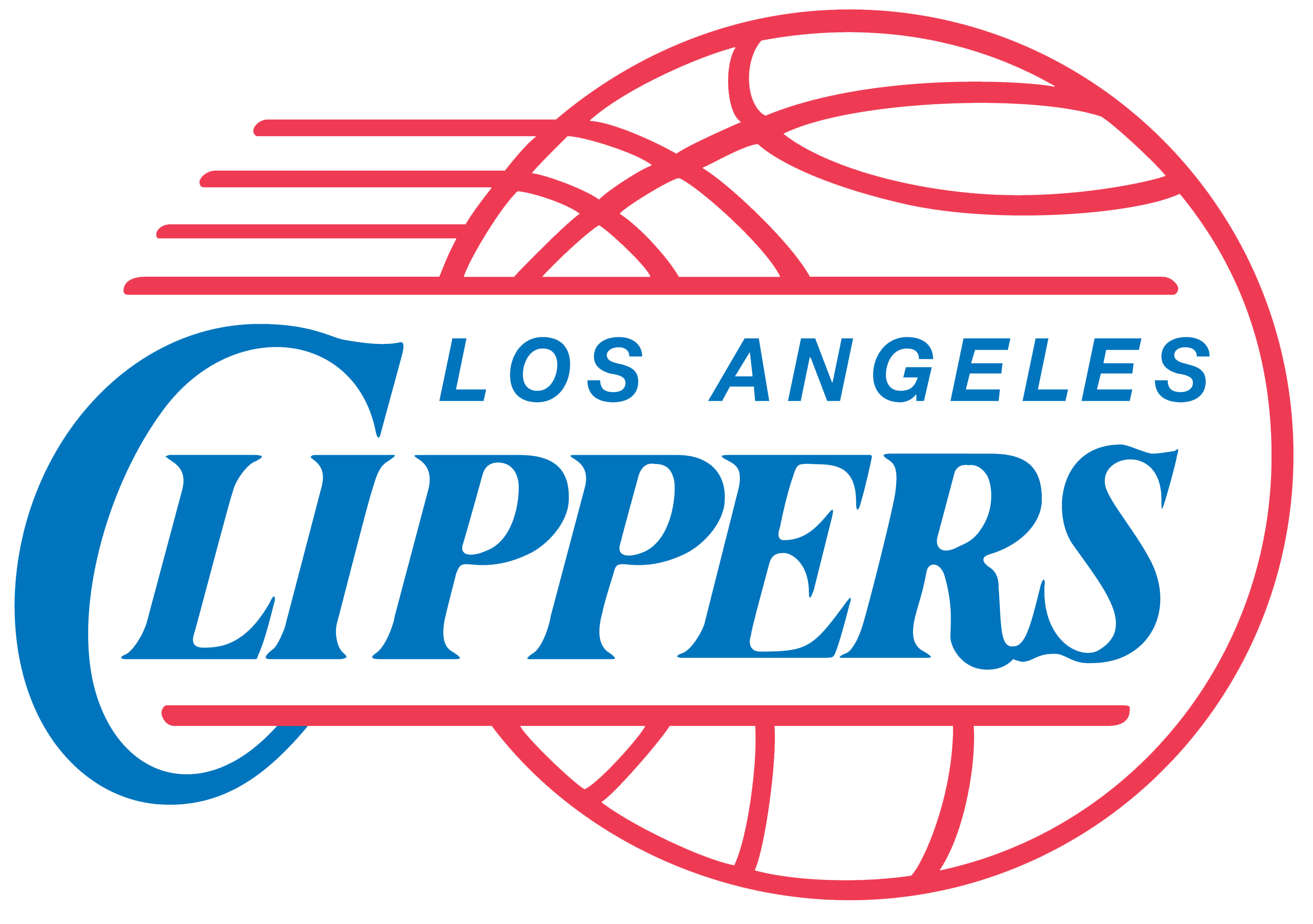
Primary logo, 1985 to 2010

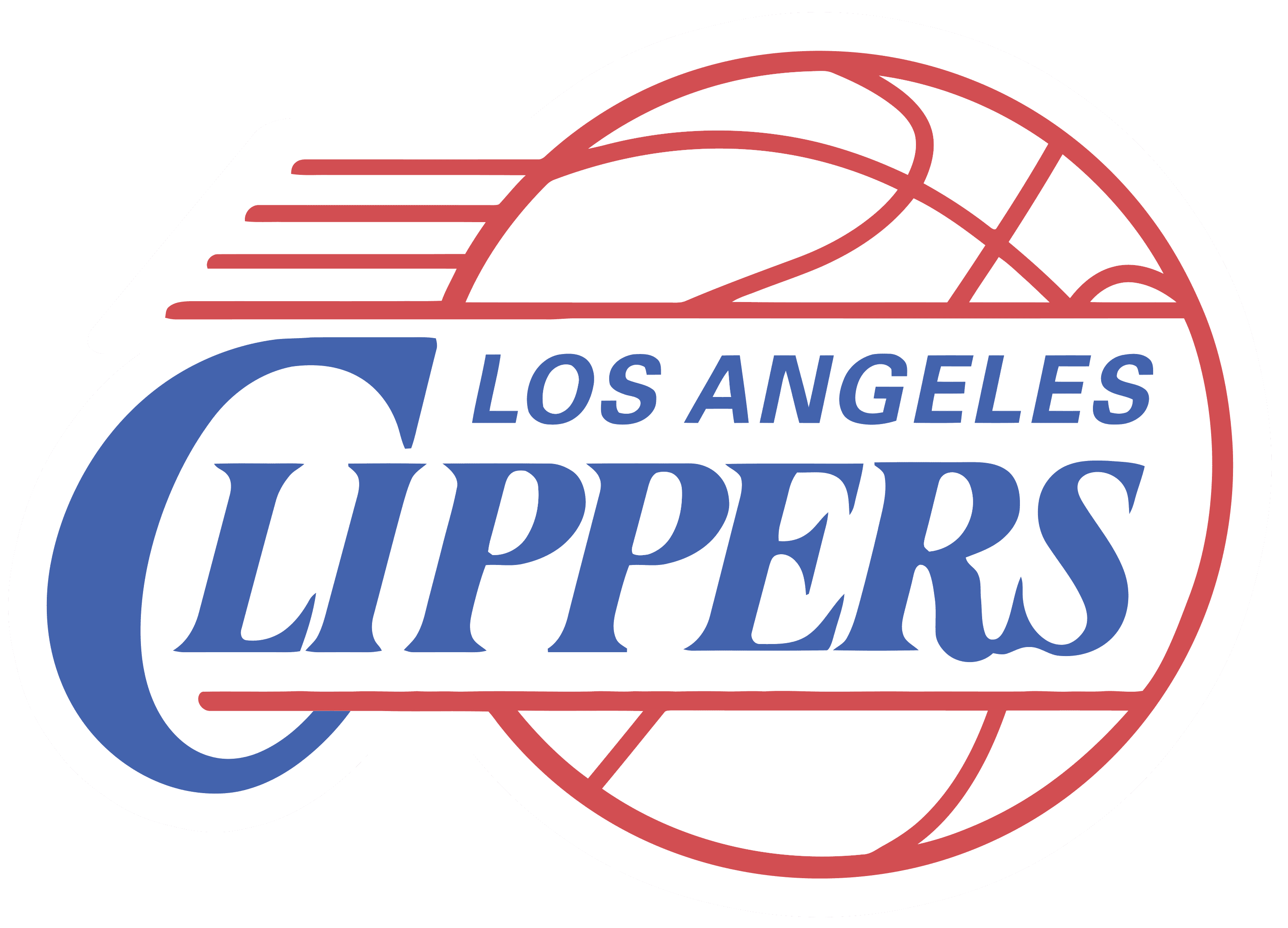
Primary logo, 2011 to 2015

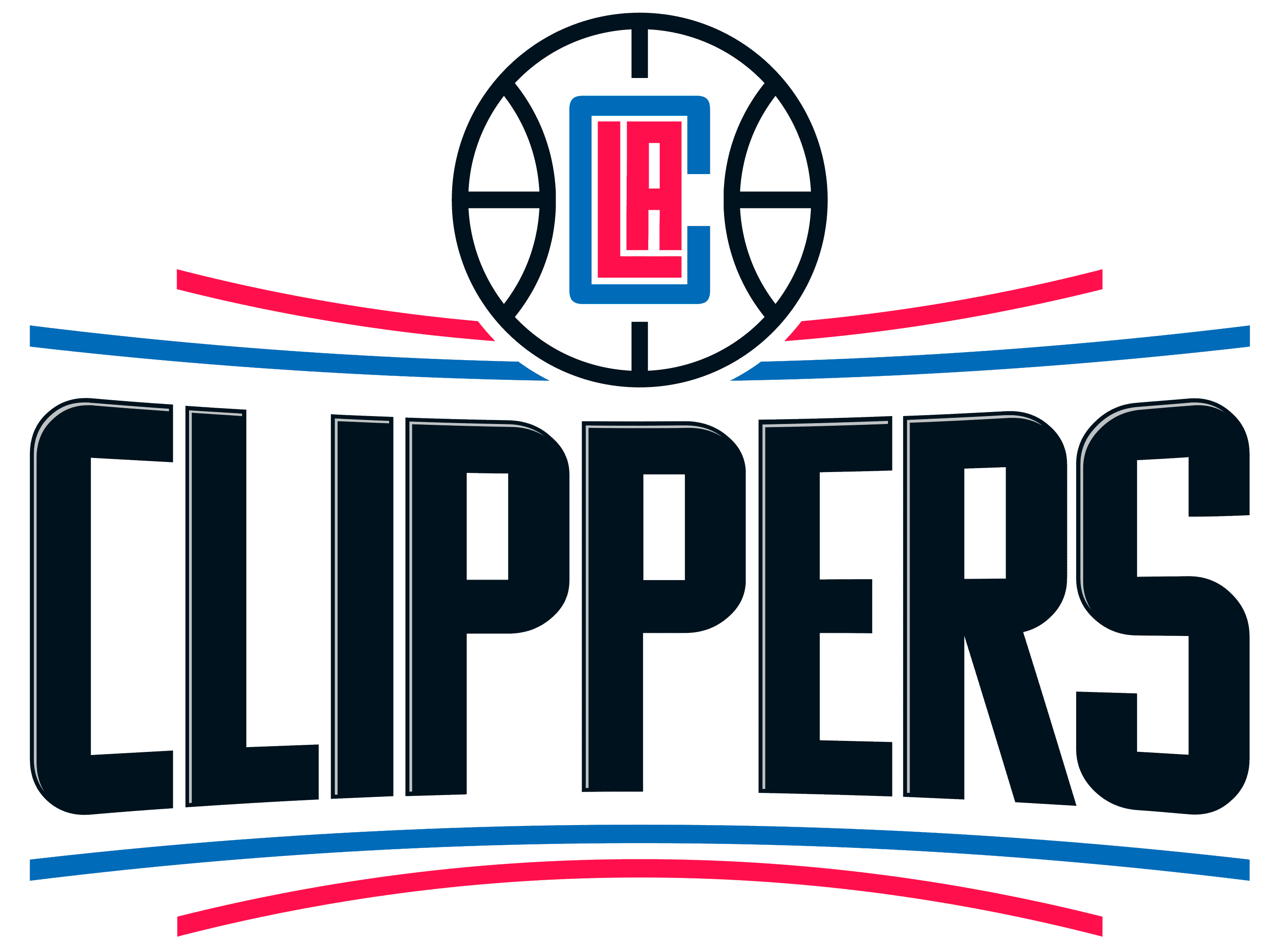
Primary logo, 2015 to 2024

When the Braves franchise moved to San Diego and renamed the Clippers, they retained the baby blue base on their uniforms, but replaced black with orange trim. A series of nautical flags which spelled "Clippers" adorned each side of the shorts. The team's original logo featured a large baby blue circle enclosing a small orange circle to represent Southern California's sunny climate and three white sails to represent a clipper. The "three sails" logo was later reused by the Clippers' G League team upon relocating from Ontario to San Diego in 2024.

In a foreshadowing move, the Clippers redesigned their logo and uniforms during the 1982–83 season. This set, which the team carried over upon moving to Los Angeles in 1984, replaced baby blue and orange with royal blue and red. The uniforms featured a royal blue base and red trim and were emblazoned with the team name in front; the "C" in the word "Clippers" was enlarged in the same manner as the logo. Most notably, "San Diego" was removed from the away jerseys and replaced with the same "Clippers" wordmark from the home jerseys. The Clippers also wore red uniforms on a number of occasions in 1984. The logo was now a generic moving white basketball with red lines superimposed over the full team name, which the team used until 2015, albeit with some tweaks to the design.

In 1987, the Clippers uniforms changed to a set that remained mostly intact until 2010. Red became the base color while blue was relegated to trim color. On the home white uniform, the team name was written in script lettering, while on the road red uniform, the city name in script was used. Later on, the road uniforms replaced the city name with the team name, and blue numerals were replaced with white numerals. Before the 2000–01 season, the Clippers made slight changes to their uniform, adding the interlocking "LAC" logo on the neckline and gaining thicker contrasting stripes and bolder numerals. Later on, the Clippers unveiled a blue alternate uniform which spelled the city name in red with white trim.

In 2010, the Clippers changed their uniforms, adjusting the stripes and letters. The white uniforms featured the team name in blue and the numerals in red, while the red uniforms were emblazoned with the city name in white and numerals in blue. Later on, the Clippers added a blue alternate uniform and a sleeved baby blue alternate uniform; both designs featured the city name in white and numerals in red.

On June 18, 2015, the Los Angeles Clippers unveiled its new brand identity. The club's primary logo features a basketball in the shape of a compass, with the club's "LAC" monogram situated in the middle. Below that is the club's wordmark logo in black, with the two curved lines below the wordmark symbolizing the horizon of the ocean, which the club says it alludes to its nautical roots. The team also unveiled its new home and away uniforms, which kept the design template from the previous uniforms. The home white uniform features the club's wordmark logo in black across the front. The away red uniform features the club's "LAC" monogram across the right breast, with the player's jersey number across the left breast.

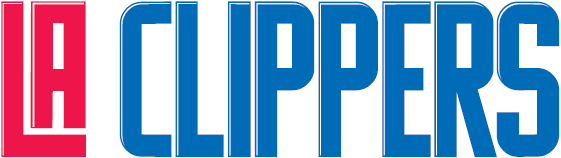
The Clippers' wordmark logo, used from 2015 to 2024.

The Clippers introduced an alternate black uniform intended to celebrate downtown Los Angeles on November 6, 2015. The uniform keeps the design template from the previous uniform, and features the club's primary logo without the wordmark.

The Clippers unveiled their new Nike Association (white) and Icon (team color) uniform designs on August 11, 2017. The home and road designations were dropped, and the team replaced its seldom-used road red uniform with a new blue "Icon" uniform that resembles the white "Association" uniform, which dropped the black accents. The black alternate (a.k.a. Statement uniform) was also retained. All three sets featured updated numeral and letter fonts.

A fourth uniform option, the City uniform, was later unveiled. For the 2017–18 season, the Clippers brought back the classic San Diego baby blue and orange scheme for their first City uniform, including the nautical flags which spell the acronym "LAC".

The next season, the Clippers wore navy blue City uniforms to commemorate the team's 35th season in Los Angeles, as well as to pay tribute to the 1984 Summer Olympics. This design returned in the 2025–26 season, but the base was changed to orange with baby blue and black accents to honor the franchise's roots as the Buffalo Braves.

In the 2019–20 season, the Clippers donned white City uniforms with black letters and "Los Angeles" in Old English font as a tribute to Los Angeles' street culture. The Clippers kept most of the same design for the 2020–21 "City" uniform, this time with a black base.

The 2021–22 "City" uniform saw the Clippers incorporate various uniform styles from the past, including the baby blue and orange of the Buffalo/San Diego era, the "Clippers" script from 1987 to 2015, and the three sails motif from the 2017–18 "City" uniform.

In the 2022–23 season, the Clippers wore black "City" uniforms as homage to the Drew League, a summer tournament in Los Angeles that celebrated its 50th anniversary in 2023. The white "Los Angeles" script was surrounded by a mosaic inspired by the Watts Towers.

The 2023–24 "City" uniform featured the shortened nickname "Clips" in a font based on the team's 1978–1983 logo. The mostly navy uniform was designed by local artist Jonas Wood, who drew inspiration from the city's love for basketball. A light Pacific blue and black colorway was used as part of the 2024–25 "City" uniform.

After reaching the 2020 NBA playoffs, the Clippers were rewarded with an "Earned" uniform for the 2020–21 season. The uniform essentially recreated the team's "Icon" uniform, but had a grey base with thick white stripes, and red and blue were relegated to the arm piping.

In the 2022–23 season, the Clippers updated their black "Statement" uniforms, replacing the "LAC" logo with the "Los Angeles" script first used in their 2019–20 and 2020–21 "City" uniforms. The three sails motif from the 2017–18 and 2021–22 "City" uniforms was also added.

Starting with the 2024–25 season, the Clippers unveiled modern versions of the script uniforms they previously wore from 1987 to 2015. The logo now featured a stylized clipper ship surrounding a navy blue "C" in a white circle and Pacific blue outline, with pointed marks inspired by a compass and a basketball silhouette on the hull. The "Association" white uniform featured the modernized script "Clippers" wordmark in navy blue with red numbers. The "Icon" navy blue uniform featured the aforementioned "Clippers" script in red with white numbers, and the red "Statement" uniform featured a stacked script "Los Angeles" wordmark in navy blue with white numbers, along with nautical flags that spell "LAC" on the navy blue stripe.

== Personnel ==
=== Current roster ===
Los Angeles Clippers roster
Players

Pos.	No.	Player	Height	Weight	DOB	From
G	3	Bradley Beal (injured)	6 ft 4 in (1.93 m)	207 lb (94 kg)	1993-06-28	Florida
G	24	Cam Christie (TW)	6 ft 5 in (1.96 m)	190 lb (86 kg)	2005-07-24	Minnesota
G/F	9	Gradey Dick	6 ft 7 in (2.01 m)	200 lb (91 kg)	2003-11-20	Kansas
G	8	Kris Dunn	6 ft 3 in (1.91 m)	205 lb (93 kg)	1994-03-18	Providence
G	10	Darius Garland	6 ft 1 in (1.85 m)	192 lb (87 kg)	2000-01-26	Vanderbilt
F	28	Rui Hachimura	6 ft 8 in (2.03 m)	230 lb (104 kg)	1998-02-08	Gonzaga
F	7	Brandon Ingram (injured)	6 ft 8 in (2.03 m)	190 lb (86 kg)	1997-09-02	Duke
F	23	Isaiah Jackson	6 ft 8 in (2.03 m)	205 lb (93 kg)	2002-01-10	Kentucky
F	5	Derrick Jones Jr.	6 ft 6 in (1.98 m)	210 lb (95 kg)	1997-02-15	UNLV
C	11	Brook Lopez	7 ft 1 in (2.16 m)	282 lb (128 kg)	1988-04-01	Stanford
F	12	Nick Martinelli (TW)	6 ft 7 in (2.01 m)	220 lb (100 kg)	2004-04-20	Northwestern
F	18	Baba Miller	6 ft 11 in (2.11 m)	204 lb (93 kg)	2004-02-07	Cincinnati
G	22	Jordan Miller (injured)	6 ft 5 in (1.96 m)	194 lb (88 kg)	2000-01-23	Miami (FL)
C	14	Yanic Konan Niederhäuser (injured)	6 ft 11 in (2.11 m)	242 lb (110 kg)	2003-03-14	Penn State
G	21	Jalen Pickett (TW)	6 ft 2 in (1.88 m)	202 lb (92 kg)	1999-10-22	Penn State
G	4	Kobe Sanders	6 ft 8 in (2.03 m)	207 lb (94 kg)	2002-05-30	Nevada
G/F	31	Max Strus	6 ft 5 in (1.96 m)	215 lb (98 kg)	1996-03-28	DePaul
G	1	Keaton Wagler	6 ft 6 in (1.98 m)	175 lb (79 kg)	2007-02-03	Illinois

Coaches
**Head coach**
- Tyronn Lue
**Assistant(s)**
- Jeremy Castleberry
- Larry Drew
- Shaun Fein
- Dahntay Jones
- Jay Larranaga
- Brian Shaw
- Jeff Van Gundy

**Legend**
- **(DP)** Unsigned draft pick
- **(FA)** Free agent
- **(S)** Suspended
- **(GL)** On assignment to G League affiliate
- **(TW)** Two-way affiliate player
- Injured

Roster
Updated: November 8, 2026

=== Retained draft rights ===
The Clippers hold the draft rights to the following unsigned draft picks who have been playing outside the NBA. A drafted player, either an international draftee or a college draftee who is not signed by the team that drafted him, is allowed to sign with any non-NBA teams. In this case, the team retains the player's draft rights in the NBA until one year after the player's contract with the non-NBA team ends. This list includes draft rights that were acquired from trades with other teams.

Draft	Round	Pick	Player	Pos.	Nationality	Current team	Note(s)	Ref
2022	2	46	Ismaël Kamagate	C	France	Varese (Italy)	Acquired from the Detroit Pistons (via Portland and Denver)	
2019	2	60	Vanja Marinković	G	Serbia	Partizan (Serbia)	Acquired from the Brooklyn Nets (via Toronto)	
2015	2	60	Luka Mitrović	F	Serbia	CSKA Moscow (Russia)	Acquired from the Philadelphia 76ers (via Sacramento)	

=== Retired numbers ===
The NBA retired Bill Russell's No. 6 for all its member teams on August 11, 2022.

=== Basketball Hall of Famers ===
Los Angeles Clippers Hall of Famers
Players
No.	Name	Position	Tenure	Inducted
**32**	Bill Walton	C	1979–1985	1993
**11**	Bob McAdoo	F/C	1972–1976	2000
**20**	Moses Malone	C/F	1976	2001
**21**	Dominique Wilkins	F	1994	2006
**44**	Adrian Dantley	F/G	1976–1977	2008
**52**	Jamaal Wilkes	F	1985	2012
**33**	Grant Hill	F	2012–2013	2018
**34**	Paul Pierce	F	2015–2017	2021
**1**	Chauncey Billups	G	2011–2013	2024
Coaches
Name		Position	Tenure	Inducted
Jack Ramsay		Head coach	1972–1976	1992
Larry Brown		Head coach	1992–1993	2002
Bill Fitch		Head coach	1994–1998	2019
**25**	Doc Rivers ^{1}	Head coach	2013–2020	2026
Contributors
Cotton Fitzsimmons		Head coach	1977–1978	2021
Jerry West		Executive	2017–2024	2024

Notes:

- ^{1} Rivers also played for the Clippers in the 1991–92 season.

=== FIBA Hall of Famers ===
Los Angeles Clippers Hall of Famers
Players
No.	Name	Position	Tenure	Inducted
**22**	Kirk Penney	G	2004–2005	2024
**8**; **15**	Hedo Türkoğlu	F	2014; 2014–2015	2026
**16**	Wang Zhizhi	C	2002–2003	2026

=== Franchise leaders ===
Bold denotes still active with team. Italic denotes still active but not with team.

Regular season (as of the end of the 2025–26 season)

Points

1. Randy Smith (12,735)
2. Blake Griffin (10,863)
3. Bob McAdoo (9,434)
4. Elton Brand (9,174)
5. Corey Maggette (8,835)
6. **Kawhi Leonard** (8,296)
7. Chris Paul (7,721)
8. Danny Manning (7,120)
9. DeAndre Jordan (7,078)
10. Loy Vaught (6,614)
11. Ken Norman (6,432)
12. Paul George (6,049)
13. Ron Harper (5,853)
14. Ivica Zubac (5,846)
15. Chris Kaman (5,813)
16. Jamal Crawford (5,675)
17. Benoit Benjamin (5,405)
18. Eric Piatkowski (5,269)
19. Charles Smith (4,994)
20. Lou Williams (4,975)
21. Bob Kauffman (4,847)
22. Swen Nater (4,694)
23. Freeman Williams (4,467)
24. World B. Free (4,299)
25. JJ Redick (4,208)
26. Lamond Murray (4,173)
27. Norm Nixon (4,127)
28. James Harden (4,112)
29. Michael Brooks (4,010)
30. Lamar Odom (3,986)

Most minutes played
Player	Minutes
Randy Smith	24,393
DeAndre Jordan	21,045
Blake Griffin	17,706
Elton Brand	17,595
Corey Maggette	15,780
Loy Vaught	15,671
Chris Kaman	14,661
Chris Paul	14,113
Ken Norman	13,584
Bob McAdoo	13,381

Most rebounds
Player	Rebounds
DeAndre Jordan	7,988
Ivica Zubac	4,771
Elton Brand	4,710
Blake Griffin	4,686
Loy Vaught	4,471
Bob McAdoo	4,229
Swen Nater	4,168
Chris Kaman	4,109
Benoit Benjamin	3,538
Randy Smith	2,985

Most assists
Player	Assists
Chris Paul	4,076
Randy Smith	3,498
Gary Grant	2,810
Norm Nixon	2,540
Blake Griffin	2,133
James Harden	1,659
Ron Harper	1,463
Ernie DiGregorio	1,457
Mark Jackson	1,402
Baron Davis	1,398

Most steals
Player	Steals
Randy Smith	1,072
Chris Paul	913
Gary Grant	747
Ron Harper	606
**Kawhi Leonard**	548
Danny Manning	548
Blake Griffin	484
Loy Vaught	468
DeAndre Jordan	448
Elton Brand	438

Most blocks
Player	Blocks
DeAndre Jordan	1,277
Benoit Benjamin	1,117
Elton Brand	1,039
Chris Kaman	707
Bob McAdoo	614
Ivica Zubac	536
Michael Olowokandi	527
Gar Heard	477
Charles Smith	451
Bo Outlaw	421

Most three-pointers made
Player	3-pointers
Paul George	820
Eric Piatkowski	738
**Kawhi Leonard**	718
JJ Redick	674
Jamal Crawford	662
Chris Paul	628
James Harden	556
**Nicolas Batum**	524
Norman Powell	473
Lou Williams	447

=== Single-season records ===
Single-season records
Category	Player	Statistics
Minutes played	Bob McAdoo	3,539
Field goals	Bob McAdoo	1,095
3-point field goals	Paul George	243
Free throws	World B. Free	654
Offensive rebounds	DeAndre Jordan	397
Defensive rebounds	Swen Nater	864
Total rebounds	DeAndre Jordan	1,226
Assists	Norm Nixon	914
Steals	Randy Smith	203
Blocks	Bob McAdoo	246
Points	Bob McAdoo	2,831
Player efficiency rating	Kawhi Leonard	28.0

=== Individual awards ===
NBA Rookie of the Year

- Terry Cummings – 1983
- Blake Griffin – 2011

NBA Most Improved Player

- Bobby Simmons – 2005

NBA Sixth Man of the Year

- Jamal Crawford – 2014, 2016
- Lou Williams – 2018, 2019
- Montrezl Harrell – 2020

NBA Sportsmanship Award

- Elton Brand – 2006

NBA Hustle Award

- Montrezl Harrell – 2020

NBA Teammate of the Year

- Chauncey Billups – 2013

NBA Executive of the Year

- Elgin Baylor – 2006

All-NBA First Team

- Chris Paul – 2012–2014
- DeAndre Jordan – 2016
- Kawhi Leonard – 2021

All-NBA Second Team

- Elton Brand – 2006
- Blake Griffin – 2012–2014
- Chris Paul – 2015, 2016
- Kawhi Leonard – 2020, 2024, 2026

All-NBA Third Team

- Dominique Wilkins – 1994
- Blake Griffin – 2015
- DeAndre Jordan – 2015, 2017
- Paul George – 2021
- James Harden – 2025

NBA All-Defensive First Team

- Chris Paul – 2012–2017
- DeAndre Jordan – 2015, 2016

NBA All-Defensive Second Team

- Patrick Beverley – 2020
- Kawhi Leonard – 2020, 2021
- Ivica Zubac – 2025

NBA All-Rookie First Team

- Terry Cummings – 1983
- Charles Smith – 1989
- Lamar Odom – 2000
- Darius Miles – 2001
- Al Thornton – 2008
- Blake Griffin – 2011

NBA All-Rookie Second Team

- Brent Barry – 1996
- Maurice Taylor – 1998
- Michael Olowokandi – 1999
- Eric Gordon – 2009
- Eric Bledsoe – 2011
- Shai Gilgeous-Alexander – 2019
- Landry Shamet – 2019

=== NBA All-Star Weekend ===
NBA All-Star selections

- World B. Free - 1980
- Norm Nixon – 1985
- Marques Johnson – 1986
- Danny Manning – 1993, 1994
- Elton Brand – 2002, 2006
- Chris Kaman – 2010
- Blake Griffin – 2011–2015
- Chris Paul – 2012–2016
- DeAndre Jordan – 2017
- Kawhi Leonard – 2020–2021, 2024
- Paul George - 2021, 2023–2024
- James Harden – 2025

NBA All-Star Game Most Valuable Player

- Randy Smith – 1978
- Chris Paul – 2013
- Kawhi Leonard – 2020

Slam Dunk champion

- Brent Barry – 1996
- Blake Griffin – 2011

== Media coverage ==
=== Radio ===
The Clippers have been broadcast by KLAC since March 2016, moving from KFWB after its sale and resulting move away from a sports format. Team-related content is carried by other iHeartMedia platforms in Los Angeles, while KEIB serves as an overflow outlet in the event of conflicts with Los Angeles Dodgers broadcasts. KWKW airs Spanish-language broadcasts.

=== TV ===
The Clippers were previously broadcast by FanDuel Sports Network SoCal, in a deal dating back to the discontinuation of SportsChannel Los Angeles and the 1993 launch of Prime Ticket. The team has often aired selected games on KTLA, including from 1985 to 1991, 2002 to 2009, and since 2022.

In 2022, the Clippers launched their own direct-to-consumer subscription streaming service known as ClipperVision, which carried most Clippers regional games live and on-demand. The service also included several altcasts, including "CourtVision" (which included live statistics overlays), "BallerVision" (which featured a rotating panel of celebrity guests such as former players), as well as Spanish and Korean-language broadcasts." In the 2025 season, the ClipperVision service was discontinued and its content was folded into the FanDuel Sports Network app and its own DTC offerings.

In 2026, following the closure of the FanDuel Sports Network chain after financial issues, the team revived ClipperVision as a direct-to-distributor operation; games will be produced by the league's in-house production unit, and available via agreements with local television providers (including Charter, DirecTV, DirecTV Stream, and FuboTV), and a DTC service offered via the NBA app. 10 games will be televised by KTLA.

=== Commentators ===
- Brian Sieman (television and radio play-by-play)
- Jim Jackson (television and radio color commentator)
- Kristina Pink (television sideline reporter)
- Carlo Jiménez: (radio play-by-play)
- Mike Fratello (pregame and postgame analyst for telecasts on FanDuel Sports Network SoCal, TV commentary fill-in)
- Corey Maggette (pregame and postgame analyst for telecasts on FanDuel Sports Network SoCal, TV commentary fill-in)
- Adam Ausland (pregame and postgame host for the KLAC/Clippers Radio Network)
