= Joe Cronin (basketball) =

American basketball manager (born 1976)

Portland Trail Blazers
- Position: General manager
- League: NBA

Personal information
- Born: Denver, Colorado, U.S.

Career information
- High school: Horizon (Thornton, Colorado)
- College: Regis (1995–1997); Northern Colorado (1997–1998)

Joe Cronin (February 11, 1976) is an American basketball executive who is currently general manager for the Portland Trail Blazers of the National Basketball Association (NBA).

== Early life ==
Cronin attended Horizon High School in Thornton, Colorado, where he was an accomplished basketball player. He attended the United States Air Force Academy Preparatory School after high school and briefly considered joining the Air Force. He then attended Regis University, where he played basketball, before transferring to the University of Northern Colorado.

== Early career ==
Before his job as general manager, Cronin held various roles within the Blazers organization, starting as the team's basketball operations intern in 2006, transitioning to pro scout/salary cap analyst in 2010, and eventually assuming the position of director of player personnel in 2014. Cronin was then elevated to the position of assistant general manager in 2021.

== Executive career ==
In December 2021, Cronin was made interim general manager of the Trail Blazers, following Neil Olshey's dismissal. On May 9, 2022, Cronin was officially hired as the organization's 11th general manager and signed a four-year contract.

Cronin was responsible for trade negotiations involving Damian Lillard. Since his hiring, Cronin has traded CJ McCollum, Norman Powell, Josh Hart, Larry Nance, Jr., and Robert Covington. With Cronin at the helm, the organization has drafted Shaedon Sharpe with the 7th pick in 2022, Scoot Henderson with the 3rd pick in 2023, and Donovan Clingan with the 7th pick in 2024.

On April 7, 2025, Cronin and the Trail Blazers agreed to a multi-year contract extension.

== Personal life ==
Cronin obtained his master's degree from the University of Denver, concurrently serving as a graduate assistant for the men's basketball team. Cronin lives in Portland with his wife, Megan. His sister is former WNBA player Katie Cronin.

Sporting positions
Preceded by Neil Olshey	Portland Trail Blazers General Manager; 2021–present	Incumbent
