= Chad Buchanan (basketball) =

American basketball executive

Indiana Pacers
- Position: General manager
- League: NBA

Personal information
- Born: September 13, 1972 (age 54) Des Moines, Iowa, U.S.

Career information
- College: Simpson College

Career history

Coaching
- 1997–2002: Simpson College (assistant)
- 2002–2003: Kansas City Knights (assistant)
- 2003–2004: Drake University (assistant)
- 2005–2015: Portland Trail Blazers (director of college scouting)
- 2011–2012: Portland Trail Blazers (interim general manager)
- 2015–2017: Charlotte Hornets (assistant general manager)
- 2017–present: Indiana Pacers (general manager)

Chad Buchanan (born September 13, 1972) is the general manager of the Indiana Pacers of the National Basketball Association.

Buchanan was hired on June 29, 2017, after previously serving two seasons as the assistant general manager for the Charlotte Hornets. Prior to the Charlotte job, Buchanan spent 10 years in the Portland Trail Blazers organization, primarily as the director of college scouting. While serving as Portland's interim general manager in 2011–12, Buchanan made the trade that sent Gerald Wallace to the Nets in exchange for the first-round pick that was later used to draft Damian Lillard. When the Pacers were considering hiring Buchanan, CBS Sports' Chris Barnewall wrote, "Buchanan is well respected across the league and his experience in college scouting is something the Pacers would find great value in."

Buchanan went to Simpson College in Indianola, Iowa, and worked as an assistant coach there from 1997 to 2002. He then became an assistant coach and assistant director of player personnel for the Kansas City Knights of the ABA in 2002–03 before working as an assistant coach at Drake in 2003–04.

Sporting positions
Preceded by Rich Cho	Portland Trail Blazers General Manager; 2011–2012	Succeeded by Neil Olshey
Preceded by Kevin Pritchard	Indiana Pacers General Manager; 2017–present	Incumbent
