= The Showbox =

Music venue in Seattle, Washington

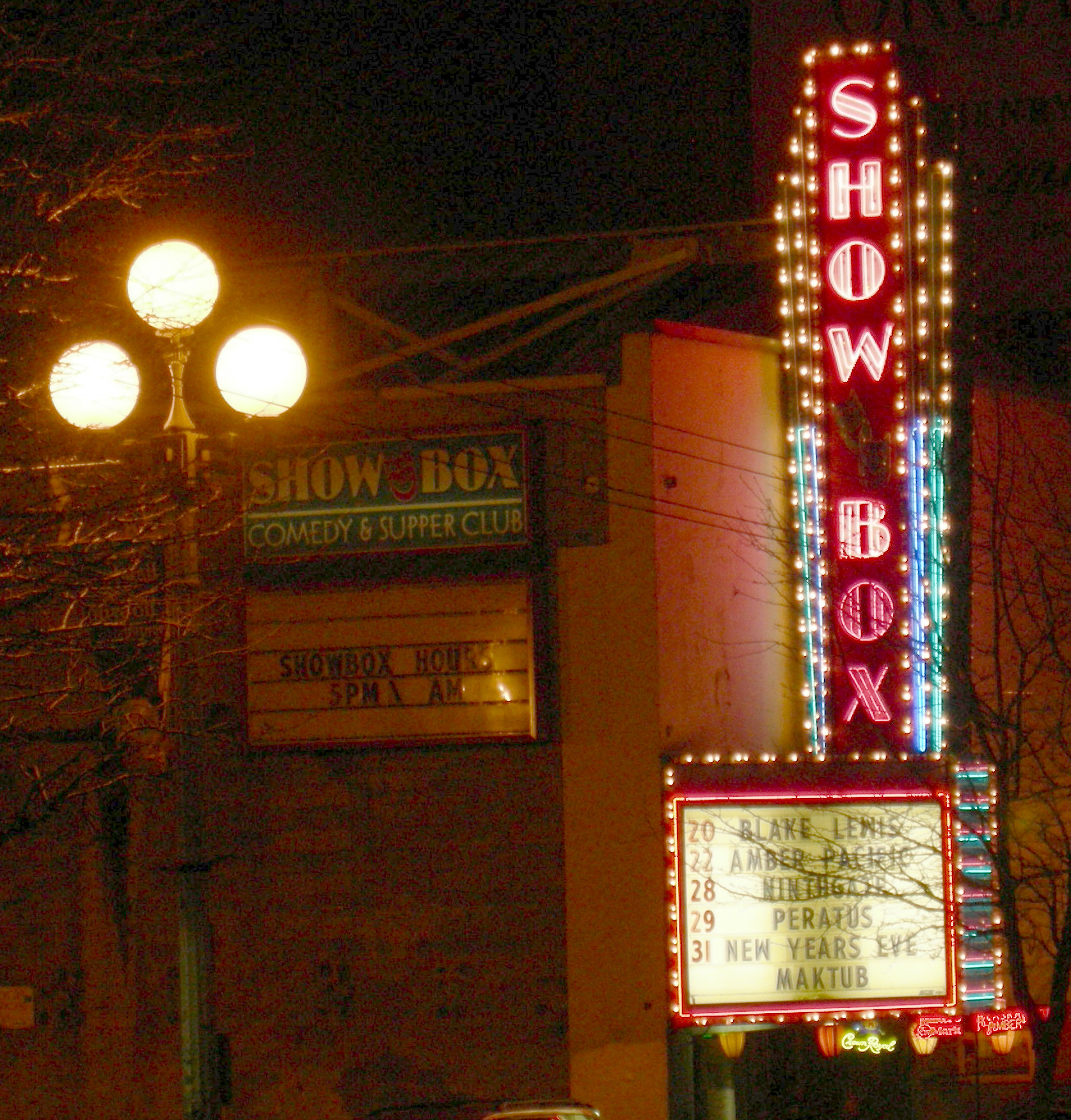
- Marquee of venue circa 2007
- Interactive map of The Showbox
- Former names: Showbox Theater (1939–48); Showbox Ballroom (1953–60); The Gathering (1967–74); Talmud Torah (1975–79); Showbox (1979–91); Showbox Lounge (1992–94); Showbox Comedy and Supper Club (1994–2007); Showbox at the Market (2007–14)
- Address: 1426 1st Avenue; Seattle, Washington; 98101
- Location: Pike Place Market
- Owner: AEG Live
- Capacity: 1,150

Construction
- Opened: July 24, 1939
- Closed: 1948-53; 1962-67

Website
- showboxpresents.com

The Showbox (originally known as the Showbox Theater) is a music venue in Seattle, Washington, United States. It has been owned by AEG Live since 2007.

== History and usage ==
Founded in 1939, the Showbox has hosted a diverse offering of music over the decades. From the Jazz Age to the Grunge Era, the ballroom has featured shows by Duke Ellington, Muddy Waters, and the Ramones — as well as local artists such as burlesque performer Gypsy Rose Lee, and grunge bands Soundgarden, Pearl Jam, Mudhoney, TAD and Screaming Trees.

After many years of operating as the Improv Comedy Club, restaurateur Tony Riviera and Barry Bloch purchased The Improv with the intent of continuing operating the venue as The Improv. Riviera and Bloch discovered old photos, historical information and articles about the Showbox and decided to recreate the venue as its original look and reopened New Year's Eve, 1995 as The Showbox Comedy and Supper Club which they operated for several years before deciding to sell the venue. Riviera went on to open numerous restaurants up and down the West Coast.

In July 2018, Vancouver-based developer Onni Group announced plans to redevelop the property into a 42-floor apartment tower. Seattle musicians such as Pearl Jam, Duff McKagan, Alice in Chains, Death Cab for Cutie, and Macklemore voiced their support for preserving the Showbox. A petition on Change.org to name the Showbox an official City of Seattle landmark garnered over 110,000 signatures.

Local preservation advocates, including Historic Seattle, Friends of Historic Belltown, and Vanishing Seattle, submitted a landmark nomination for review by the City of Seattle's Landmarks Preservation Board in June 2019. The board unanimously decided to grant the Showbox landmark designation on July 17, 2019, preventing the theater from being demolished. The property owner filed a lawsuit against the city of Seattle. Claims of damages were dismissed by the court, but a trial was scheduled for August 2019 regarding other claims.

On November 19, 2019, the Historic Seattle group announced a partnership with the Seattle Theatre Group and submitted a formal offer to purchase the property. The partnership would retain AEG as the operating tenant through at least 2024.

== Showbox SoDo ==
Showbox SoDo
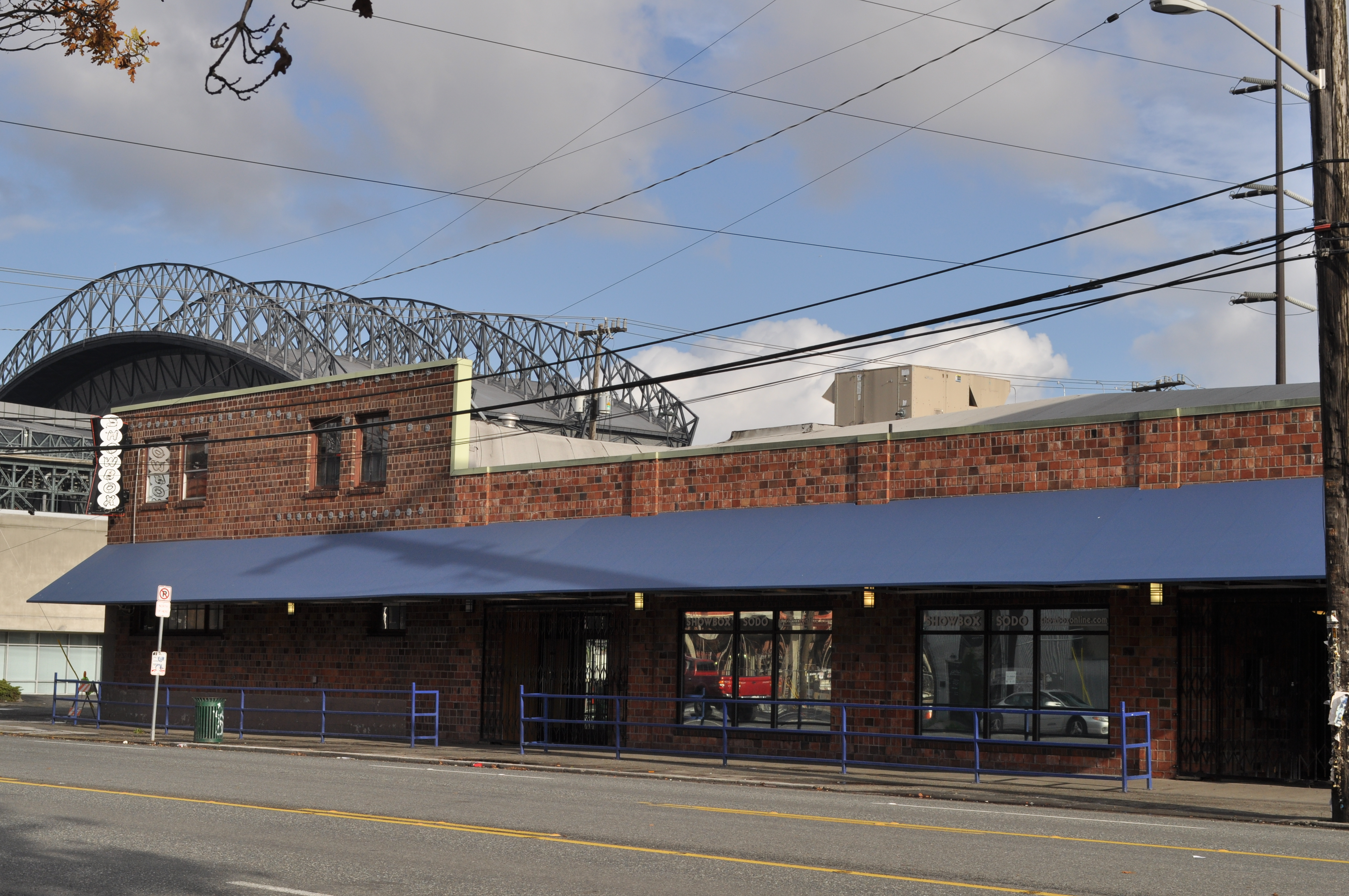
- Interactive map of Showbox SoDo
- Former names: Fenix Underground (2006–07); Premier (2004–05)
- Address: 1700 1st Avenue South; Seattle, WA 98134
- Location: SoDo
- Coordinates: 47.588°N 122.3338°W
- Owner: WSA Properties VI LLC; AEG Live (operator)
- Capacity: 1,800

Construction
- Opened: 1992

Showbox SoDo opened in 2007 and belongs to the "Showbox Presents" family. It is located at 1700 1st Avenue South, Seattle, Washington, a few blocks south of T-Mobile Park and Lumen Field. It takes its name from the SoDo district, an area south of downtown Seattle and Pioneer Square.

A converted-warehouse-turned-concert-venue, the Premier nightclub opened in the building in early 2004 but closed in 2005. In Fall 2006, the Fenix Underground, a club that spent 15 years in two locations in Pioneer Square, took over the space but just as quickly folded when it filed for bankruptcy in May 2007. The Showbox stepped in and added the venue to its family, opening as the Showbox SoDo in September 2007.

The space has wood-beam and brick architecture. With a capacity of 1,800, it is larger than its elder sibling, which was renamed The Showbox at the Market to distinguish the two.

The venue has hosted events featuring My Bloody Valentine, Heart, The Pogues, M.I.A, The Hives, Dropkick Murphys, Josh Ritter, Counting Crows, Panic! at the Disco, Adam Lambert, Odd Future, Jillian Banks, The WhiteTrash Whiplash, Trivium and others.

=== Ownership and potential replacement by an arena ===
The Showbox SoDo was originally built as a truck warehouse in 1935 for John Eddy Franklin, who was also responsible for the Columbarium at Evergreen Washelli Funeral Home. The main part of the warehouse had a dirt floor and a gas pump.

The building and the land parcel are currently owned by WSA Properties VI LLC, a holding company founded by hedge fund manager Chris Hansen and Steve Ballmer, the former Microsoft chief executive officer and current owner of the Los Angeles Clippers basketball team.

Purchased in August 2012, Hansen and Ballmer intended to use the land as part of a proposal for a new sports arena to lure an NBA team back to Seattle following the relocation of the SuperSonics to Oklahoma City in 2008. After a failed effort to purchase and relocate the Sacramento Kings in 2013, a five-year exclusive agreement with the city on the arena development ended in 2017. The city subsequently negotiated a deal with Oak View Group to build a new arena on the site of the former KeyArena across town at Seattle Center, preserving that building's historic roof.

While Hansen holds onto the property as a potential back-up arena plan, should Climate Pledge Arena fail to secure an NBA team, the Showbox SoDo continues to operate at its location.
