= Relocation of major professional sports teams in the United States and Canada =

Relocation of major professional sports teams occurs when a team owner moves a team, generally from one metropolitan area to another, but occasionally between municipalities in the same conurbation. The practice is most common in North America, where a league franchise system is used and the teams are overwhelmingly privately owned. Owners who move a team generally do so seeking better profits, facilities, fan support, or a combination of these.

Unlike most professional sport systems, North America lacks comprehensive governing bodies whose authority extends from the amateur to the highest levels of a given sport. North American sports generally do not operate a system of promotion and relegation in which poorly performing teams are replaced with teams that do well in lower-level leagues, forming a franchise and minor league system instead.

== Background ==
A city wishing to get a team in a major professional sports league can wait for the league to expand and award new franchises. However, such expansions are infrequent, and generally limited to a narrow window in time. Many current owners believe 32 is the optimal size for a major league due to playoff structure and ease of scheduling. As of 2024, each of the major leagues has between 30 and 32 franchises. The National Hockey League (NHL) has expanded to 32 teams in total, with the Vegas Golden Knights having become the league's 31st team in 2017, the Seattle Kraken having become the 32nd team in 2021, and the Utah Mammoth joining the league in 2024 as a result of the deactivation of the Arizona Coyotes franchise.

In past decades, aspiring owners whose overtures had been rejected by the established leagues would respond by forming a rival league in hopes that the existing major league would eventually agree to a merger; the new league would attain major league status in its own right; or the established league was compelled to expand. The 1960s American Football League (AFL) is perhaps the most recent example of a successful rival league, having achieved each of the three goals listed above in reverse order. However, all major sports have had a rival league achieve at least some of these goals in the last half of the 20th century. Baseball's proposed Continental League did not play a game but only because Major League Baseball responded to the proposal by adding teams in some of the new league's proposed cities. The American Basketball Association (ABA) and World Hockey Association (WHA) each succeeded in getting some of their franchises accepted into the established leagues, which had both unsuccessfully attempted to cause their upstart rivals to fold outright by adding more teams.

However, the upstart leagues owed their success in large part to the reluctance of owners in the established leagues to devote the majority of their revenues to player salaries and also to sports leagues' former reliance primarily on gate receipts for revenue. Under those conditions, an ambitious rival could often afford to lure away the sport's top players with promises of better pay, in hopes of giving the new league immediate respect and credibility from fans. Today, however, established leagues derive a large portion of their revenue from lucrative television contracts that would not be offered to an untested rival. Also, the activism of players' unions has resulted in the established leagues paying a majority of their revenues to players, thus the average salary in each of the big four leagues is now well in excess of $1 million per season.

Under present market and financial conditions, any serious attempt to form a rival league in the early 21st century would likely require hundreds of millions (if not billions) of dollars in investment and initial losses, and even if such resources were made available the upstart league's success would be far from guaranteed, as evidenced by the failure of the WWF/NBC-backed XFL in 2001 and the UFL from 2009 to 2012. The current major leagues have established lucrative relationships with all of the major media outlets in the United States, who subsidize the league's operations because their established fame ensures strong ratings; the networks are far less willing to provide such coverage to an unproven upstart league, often requiring the upstart league to pay the network for those leagues to be covered or, in the post-network era, secure a streaming television contract.

Therefore, as long as leagues choose not to expand or reject a city's application, the only realistic recourse is to convince the owners of an existing team to move it (or convince a prospective owner to purchase a team with the intent of moving it). Owners usually move teams because of weak fan support or because the team organization is in debt and needs an adequate population for financial support or because another city offers a bigger local market or a more financially lucrative stadium/arena deal. Governments may offer lucrative deals to team owners to attract or retain a team. For example, to attract the NFL's Cleveland Browns in 1995, the state of Maryland agreed to build a new stadium in Baltimore and allow the team to use it rent-free and keep all parking, advertising and concession revenue. (This move proved so unpopular in Cleveland that the move was treated as the Baltimore Ravens being awarded an expansion franchise, and the Browns name and their official lineage would remain in Cleveland for a "reactivated" team that rejoined the NFL three years later.) A little more than a decade earlier, the Baltimore Colts left for Indianapolis (NFL owners voted to give Colts owner Robert Irsay permission to move his franchise to the city of his choosing after no satisfactory stadium would be built).

Moving sports teams is often controversial. Opponents criticize owners for leaving behind faithful fans and governments for spending millions of dollars of tax money on attracting teams. However, since sports teams in the United States are generally treated like any other business under antitrust law, there is little sports leagues can do to prevent teams from flocking to the highest bidders (for instance, the Los Angeles Rams filed suit when the other NFL owners initially blocked their move to St. Louis, which caused the NFL to back down and allow the move to proceed). Major League Baseball, unique among the major professional sports leagues, has an exemption from antitrust laws won by a Supreme Court decision but nonetheless has allowed several teams to change cities. Also recently, courts denied the attempted move of the team then known as the Phoenix Coyotes by siding with the NHL, which claimed that it had final authority over franchise moves.

Newer sports leagues tend to have more transient franchises than more established, "major" leagues, but in the mid-1990s, several NFL and NHL teams moved to other cities, and the threat of a move pushed cities with major-league teams in any sport to build new stadiums and arenas using taxpayer money. The trend continued in the 2000s, when three National Basketball Association (NBA) teams moved in a seven-year span after there were no moves at all in the 16 years before it. Critics referred to the movement of teams to the highest-bidding city as "franchise free agency."

== List ==
The following charts list movements of franchises in the modern eras of the major North American sports leagues. It does not include:

- Moves within a city, which have occurred many times in all major leagues.
- Short distance moves from one city in a metro area to another city in the same metro area. (For example, San Francisco to Oakland or vice versa.)
- Short-distance city-suburb moves. (For example, Los Angeles to Anaheim, both of which are in the same urban agglomeration.)
- Team moves that happened before the organization joined its current league.
  - However, the NFL has fully incorporated the American Football League of the 1960s in its own history. Moves of AFL teams during the existence of that league are therefore included.
- Moves of teams that, as of 2025, no longer exist. There were many such moves in the early years of the NFL in particular.
- Teams that have threatened to move as leverage for a new stadium or arena in their current market without actually moving, as well as teams that nearly moved for other reasons, not related to team dissatisfaction in a given market. (For example, the Pittsburgh Pirates nearly moving to Denver following the Pittsburgh drug trials in 1985, the Minnesota Timberwolves almost moving to New Orleans in 1994, or the Sacramento Kings almost moving to Anaheim, Seattle, and Virginia Beach from 2011 to 2013.)

=== Major League Baseball ===
- 1902: Original Milwaukee Brewers moved to St. Louis and became the St. Louis Browns.
- 1903: Original Baltimore Orioles moved to New York City and became the New York Highlanders. The team was renamed as the New York Yankees in 1913. As this situation may also be considered a case of the American League dissolving the Baltimore franchise and issuing a new franchise in New York City, Yankees history information usually begins in 1903.
- 1953: Boston Braves moved to Milwaukee. It was the first move for a team in MLB, which for 50 years had consisted of 16 teams playing in their original 10 cities.
- 1954: St. Louis Browns moved to Baltimore and became the Baltimore Orioles.
- 1955: Philadelphia Athletics moved to Kansas City, Missouri.
- 1958: Brooklyn Dodgers moved to Los Angeles; the New York Giants moved to San Francisco. These were the first major league teams to be based in the U.S. West Coast; the teams moved simultaneously to facilitate travel for other National League (NL) teams. The NL granted New York City a new expansion franchise, the New York Mets, in 1962.
- 1961: Washington Senators moved to the Twin Cities area and became the Minnesota Twins. Not wishing to alienate Washington, D.C., the American League (AL) granted the city a new expansion franchise, also called the Washington Senators.
- 1966: Milwaukee Braves moved to Atlanta.
- 1968: Kansas City Athletics moved to Oakland, California, becoming the Oakland Athletics. Because Charles O. Finley broke a recently signed lease and public bonds were already issued for the building of what is now known as Kauffman Stadium, Major League Baseball was in danger of anti-trust legislation from Stuart Symington, U.S. Senator from Missouri. As a result, the AL granted Kansas City a new expansion franchise, the Kansas City Royals, in 1969.
- 1970: Seattle Pilots moved to Milwaukee and became the Milwaukee Brewers. The AL granted Seattle a new expansion franchise, the Seattle Mariners, in 1977.
- 1972: Washington Senators moved to Arlington, Texas and became the Texas Rangers.
- 2005: Montreal Expos moved to Washington, D.C., and became the Washington Nationals. The Expos had split time between Montreal and San Juan, Puerto Rico in 2003 and 2004. This was the first move in 33 years.
- 2020: Toronto Blue Jays temporarily moved to Buffalo, New York, the home of their AAA affiliate, after the Canada–United States border was closed during the COVID-19 pandemic, preventing visiting teams from traveling to the Rogers Centre. It saw the first MLB games played in Buffalo since the Buffalo Blues of the Federal League folded in 1915, and marked the first time no games were played in Canada since 1968.
- 2021: The Toronto Blue Jays played in Dunedin, Florida, from April 8 to May 24, then in Buffalo, New York, from June 1 to July 21. On July 30, the team moved back to Toronto and the Rogers Centre.
- 2025: Oakland Athletics moved temporarily to West Sacramento, California, ahead of their move from Oakland to Las Vegas, Nevada, and were simply being referred to as the Athletics.
- 2028: The Athletics will move to New Las Vegas Stadium in Las Vegas, upon its opening, and will retain the "Athletics" name.

=== National Basketball Association ===
- 1951: Tri-Cities Blackhawks, who played their home games in Moline, Illinois, moved to Milwaukee and became the Milwaukee Hawks.
- 1955: Milwaukee Hawks moved to St. Louis. The NBA granted Milwaukee a new expansion franchise, the Bucks, in 1968.
- 1957: Fort Wayne Pistons moved to Detroit.
- 1957: Rochester Royals moved to Cincinnati.
- 1960: Minneapolis Lakers moved to Los Angeles. The NBA granted Minneapolis a new expansion franchise, the Minnesota Timberwolves, in 1989.
- 1962: Philadelphia Warriors moved to the San Francisco Bay Area and became the San Francisco Warriors, then the Golden State Warriors in 1971.
- 1963: Chicago Zephyrs moved to Baltimore and became the Baltimore Bullets. The NBA granted Chicago a new expansion franchise, the Bulls, in 1966.
- 1963: Syracuse Nationals moved to Philadelphia and became the Philadelphia 76ers.
- 1968: St. Louis Hawks moved to Atlanta.
- 1971: San Diego Rockets moved to Houston.
- 1972: Cincinnati Royals moved to a new primary home in Kansas City and a secondary home in Omaha, becoming the Kansas City-Omaha Kings (to avoid confusion with the baseball Royals.) The team ceased playing home games in Omaha in 1975.
- 1973: Baltimore Bullets moved to Landover, Maryland, outside Washington, D.C., and were renamed as the Capital Bullets. The team was renamed the Washington Bullets in 1974; in conjunction with the opening of their new arena in downtown D.C., the team was renamed the Washington Wizards in 1997.
- 1978: Buffalo Braves moved to San Diego and became the San Diego Clippers.
- 1979: New Orleans Jazz moved to Salt Lake City.
- 1984: San Diego Clippers moved to Los Angeles.
- 1985: Kansas City Kings moved to Sacramento, California.
- 2001: Vancouver Grizzlies moved to Memphis, Tennessee and became the Memphis Grizzlies.
- 2002: Charlotte Hornets moved to New Orleans. The NBA granted Charlotte a new expansion franchise, known as the Bobcats, in 2004. The Bobcats reclaimed the Hornets name before the start of the 2014–15 season.
  - At the same time that the name change to Hornets was announced, it was also revealed that the Hornets, the league, and the franchise now known as the New Orleans Pelicans had reached an agreement that the history of the original Charlotte Hornets would belong exclusively to the current Hornets. As a result, the NBA now considers the Charlotte Hornets to have begun play in the 1988–89 season, suspended operations following the 2001–02 season, returned as the Bobcats beginning with the 2004–05 season, and renamed the Hornets beginning with the 2014–15 season, while the New Orleans Pelicans kept their history as the Hornets from moving in 2002.
- 2005: New Orleans Hornets moved temporarily to Oklahoma City following Hurricane Katrina and became the New Orleans/Oklahoma City Hornets.
- 2007: New Orleans/Oklahoma City Hornets returned to New Orleans full-time. The team was renamed as the Pelicans in 2013.
- 2008: Seattle SuperSonics moved to Oklahoma City and became the Oklahoma City Thunder.
- 2020: Toronto Raptors moved temporarily to Tampa due to the closure of the Canada–United States border stemming from the COVID-19 situation affecting Canada, preventing the Raptors from playing their home games in the Scotiabank Arena.
- 2021: Toronto Raptors moved back to Toronto and returned to the Scotiabank Arena full-time.

=== National Football League ===
The history of the NFL fully incorporates that of the fourth American Football League, which began operation in 1960 with eight teams and became by far the most successful rival to the NFL. In 1966, the two leagues agreed to a merger that took full effect in 1970. All teams from the 1960–1969 AFL were brought intact to the NFL, and the current NFL recognizes all AFL records and statistics as its own.

- 1921: Decatur Staleys moved to Chicago and became the Bears one year later.
- 1934: Portsmouth Spartans moved to Detroit and became the Lions.
- 1937: Boston Redskins moved to Washington, D.C. The team was renamed as the Washington Commanders in 2022.
- 1946: Cleveland Rams moved to Los Angeles. The NFL granted Cleveland a new franchise when the AAFC's Cleveland Browns joined the league in 1950.
- 1960: Chicago Cardinals moved to St. Louis.
- 1961: The AFL's Los Angeles Chargers moved to San Diego after spending their inaugural 1960 season in Los Angeles.
- 1963: The AFL's Dallas Texans (not to be confused with the short-lived NFL franchise of the same name) moved to Kansas City, Missouri, and became the Kansas City Chiefs.
- 1982: Oakland Raiders moved to Los Angeles. Although the NFL refused permission for the move, the team won the right to move (as well as the right to remain as a franchise in its conference and in the league) through a court case.
- 1984: Baltimore Colts moved to Indianapolis. The team's offices were slipped out of Baltimore in the middle of the night to avoid a proposed eminent domain seizure by the state of Maryland.
- 1988: St. Louis Cardinals moved to the Phoenix area, playing games in nearby Tempe and became the Phoenix Cardinals. The team was renamed the Arizona Cardinals in 1994. The team now plays in another Phoenix suburb, Glendale.
- 1995: Los Angeles Raiders moved back to Oakland after 13 seasons.
- 1995: Los Angeles Rams moved to St. Louis.
- 1996: Cleveland Browns players and coaching staff moved to Baltimore and became the Baltimore Ravens. The move was one of the most controversial in major professional sports history. In response to a fan revolt and legal threats, the NFL awarded a new franchise to Cleveland in 1999, which for historical purposes is considered a continuation of the original Browns franchise.
- 1997: Houston Oilers moved to Memphis, Tennessee. The team originally planned to play the 1997 and 1998 seasons in Liberty Bowl Memorial Stadium in Memphis before moving to Nashville. However, due to poor attendance, the team moved to Nashville in 1998, playing in Vanderbilt University's stadium. The team was renamed as the Tennessee Titans in 1999, when its new stadium was opened. The NFL granted Houston a new expansion franchise in 2002.
- 2016: St. Louis Rams moved back to Los Angeles after 21 seasons in St. Louis. The team moved to a newly built SoFi Stadium in nearby Inglewood in 2020. Rams owner and CEO Stan Kroenke later settled for $790 million to the city of St. Louis over his bad faith efforts to keep the team in St. Louis.
- 2017: San Diego Chargers returned to their original home of Los Angeles after 56 seasons in San Diego. The team played in the suburb of Carson before joining the Rams at their new stadium in 2020.
- 2020: Oakland Raiders were approved to move to a recently constructed Allegiant Stadium in the Las Vegas area in 2020. The team played in Oakland for the 2018 season and, due to being thwarted in its plans to play in San Francisco by their regional rivals the 49ers, were forced to play in Oakland in 2019 as well before completing the move to Las Vegas in 2020.

=== National Hockey League ===
Only one NHL team that has moved kept its name: the Calgary Flames.

The Edmonton Oilers nearly moved to Houston in 1998, but the team remained in the city after a limited partnership raised enough money to purchase the franchise before the deadline. The then-Phoenix Coyotes were placed into bankruptcy with the intent to circumvent the league's relocation rules, but this was blocked by a judge. Other threats to leave came from two of the 1967 expansion teams, the Pittsburgh Penguins (on multiple occasions) and St. Louis Blues (in 1983), but ultimately stayed in their existing markets.

During the COVID-19 pandemic, when Canada's MLB and NBA teams temporarily moved to the United States, its NHL teams stayed put. Instead, the league temporarily abolished conferences and re-aligned divisions for the 2020–21 season, consolidating all seven Canadian teams to the North Division due to travel restrictions at the Canada–United States Border.

- 1976: California Golden Seals, who played their home games in Oakland, moved to Cleveland and became the Barons. The Cleveland Barons then merged with the Minnesota North Stars two years later; the San Francisco Bay Area was awarded the San Jose Sharks in 1991 when the owners threatened to move the team from Minnesota, and they were allowed to split half of the team back to San Jose.
- 1976: Kansas City Scouts moved to Denver and became the Colorado Rockies.
- 1978: The Cleveland Barons franchise merged with the Minnesota North Stars; Ohio was awarded an expansion team (the Columbus Blue Jackets) in 2000.
- 1980: Atlanta Flames moved to Calgary; Atlanta was awarded an expansion team in 1999, which moved to Winnipeg in 2011.
- 1982: Colorado Rockies moved to East Rutherford and became the New Jersey Devils; 13 years later, Denver received the Quebec Nordiques.
- 1993: Minnesota North Stars moved to Dallas and became the Stars; Minnesota was awarded an expansion team in 2000.
- 1995: Quebec Nordiques moved to Denver and became the Colorado Avalanche.
- 1996: Winnipeg Jets moved to Phoenix and became the Phoenix Coyotes. The team changed its geographic name to Arizona before the 2014–15 season. In 2011, Winnipeg would receive another team, also called the Jets, through the move of the Atlanta Thrashers.
  - In 2026, the situation regarding the statistical history of both the Jets and Coyotes were changed, when the NHL retroactively reassigned the statistical history of the first Jets team from the Coyotes team to the modern day Jets team. As such, the Winnipeg Jets are now regarded as having joined the NHL in 1979, suspended operations in 1996, transferred all their assets to the Phoenix/Arizona Coyotes, before being reactivated and moved to Atlanta in 1999, to become the Atlanta Thrashers, before finally returning to Winnipeg in 2011 to become the Jets again. Meanwhile, the Coyotes are now seen as a 1996 expansion team.
- 1997: Hartford Whalers moved to Raleigh and became the Carolina Hurricanes. For the 1997–98 and 1998–98 seasons, they played home games in Greensboro while their intended home, the venue now known as Lenovo Center, was under construction in Raleigh.
- 2011: Atlanta Thrashers moved to Winnipeg and became the new Winnipeg Jets.
- 2024: Arizona Coyotes players, coaching staff and personnel moved to Salt Lake City, Utah, and became the Utah Hockey Club for the 2024–25 season, eventually adopting the permanent name of Utah Mammoth after that season. However, the Arizona Coyotes records and trademarks remained behind in Arizona, which gives current Coyotes ownership until 2029 to secure a new arena financing deal, after which the franchise will be reactivated via expansion.

=== Major League Soccer ===
- 2006: San Jose Earthquakes moved to Houston and became the Houston Dynamo; however, the team records, logo, colors, championships and history were left in San Jose. An option for an MLS franchise was awarded to Oakland Athletics owner Lew Wolff in 2006 and the option was exercised in 2007. The Earthquakes resumed play in MLS in 2008 as a continuation of the previous Earthquakes franchise under new ownership.
- 2020: All three Canadian franchises moved temporarily to the United States after the Canada–United States border was closed during the COVID-19 pandemic, preventing visiting teams from playing on Canadian soil.
- 2021: All three Canadian franchises returned to Canada from the United States in July.

=== Canadian Football League ===
While none of the CFL's core Canadian franchises have moved from one market to another, the league's short-lived expansion into the United States did include one team move.

- 1995: the Sacramento Gold Miners, the first CFL member in the United States, moved to San Antonio, Texas, to become the San Antonio Texans.

The league also attempted to move the Las Vegas Posse after their single season of 1994. Before the 1995 season, multiple ownership groups unsuccessfully tried to buy the team for a move to Jackson, Mississippi. The franchise was considered "suspended" for the 1995 season. Following that, plans were made to move the team to Miami, Florida, as the Manatees, but plans fell through when the league chose to end the U.S. expansion before the Manatees' scheduled launch in 1996.

The CFL's expansion into the U.S. began and ended with events that were not technically team moves, but were also not truly new teams. The staff of the Ottawa Rough Riders moved from Ottawa to Shreveport, Louisiana, to become the Shreveport Pirates in 1994, but the CFL convinced the owners to sell the team to new owners and were instead awarded a conditional U.S. expansion plus the right to retain five players of their choice. In 1996, the owners of the Baltimore Stallions folded the team upon the announcement that the Cleveland Browns would move to Baltimore (see Cleveland Browns relocation controversy). Despite high attendance and success on the field, management felt that they would be unable to compete with an NFL team in the same city. The Stallions' ownership group took over the then-dormant Montreal Alouettes franchise. While the players were released from their contracts with the Stallions, many were subsequently signed to the Alouettes. The CFL and the Alouettes do not consider the Stallions' records, including the 1995 Grey Cup victory, as part of the team's legacy. The Alouettes are instead considered a continuation of the previous teams of that name.

=== Women's National Basketball Association ===
- 2003: Utah Starzz, who played their home games in Salt Lake City, moved to San Antonio and became the Silver Stars, later renamed the Stars.
- 2003: Orlando Miracle moved to Uncasville, Connecticut, and became the Connecticut Sun.
- 2010: Detroit Shock moved to Tulsa, Oklahoma.
- 2016: Tulsa Shock moved to Arlington, Texas and became the Dallas Wings.
- 2018: San Antonio Stars moved to Las Vegas and became the Aces.
- 2027: Connecticut Sun will move to Houston and become the new Comets.
