= Peter Higgins =

Peter or Pete Higgins may refer to:

- Pete B. Higgins (born 1957), American dentist and politician
- Pete Higgins (businessman), early Microsoft employee and investment capitalist
- Peter Higgins (athlete) (1928–1993), British sprinter
- Peter Higgins (footballer) (born 1966), Australian rules footballer
