= Baker McKenzie =

Multinational law firm

- Headquarters: Chicago, Illinois
- No. of offices: 74
- No. of attorneys: 4,595
- Major practice areas: Commercial law, M&A, antitrust, tax law
- Key people: Sunny Mann (chair)
- Revenue: ▲$3.64 billion (2025)
- Profit per equity partner: $2.103 million (2024)
- Date founded: 1949
- Founder: Russell Baker; John McKenzie
- Company type: Swiss verein
- Website: bakermckenzie.com

Baker McKenzie is a multinational corporate law firm headquartered in Chicago. Founded in 1949, as Baker & McKenzie, it operates decentralized offices in 45 countries, and is best known for its cross-border trading and tax law expertise.

== History ==
Co-founding partner Russell Baker, who had graduated from the University of Chicago Law School, opened his first practice, Baker & Simpson, with Dana Simpson, in Chicago in 1925. The firm provided legal services to the growing Mexican American community in Chicago, which would set a foundation for its global reach. Simpson retired in 1932. In 1949 Baker was joined by John McKenzie, a graduate from Loyola University Chicago School of Law, who helped further establish the international practice.

Baker McKenzie became the first multinational law firm in the world, beginning in 1955, after a lawyer in Venezuela contacted the firm, seeking to open a joint venture office in Caracas. Russell Baker's son, Donald, moved to Caracas to launch the satellite office. Within the next three years, offices were opened in Washington, D.C., Amsterdam, Brussels, Zürich, New York City and São Paulo. By 1978, Baker McKenzie had 26 offices in 20 countries. By 1990, the firm operated 49 offices on six continents, employing around 1500 attorneys, and generating $400 million in annual revenue.

In 1999, Christine Lagarde, the Paris managing partner and an antitrust and labor lawyer, was elected chair of the global executive committee, the first woman to lead Baker McKenzie, or a major international law firm; she was chair for five years. Legarde later became France's Minister of Finance and managing director of the International Monetary Fund.

In 2001, the firm employed 3,000 attorneys and garnered $1 billion in revenues. In 2005, 70 partners, and other legal staff, from the New York office of disbanding international firm Coudert Brothers joined Baker McKenzie.

In 2004, Baker McKenzie was the first major law firm to become a Swiss Verein. In October 2006, Unilever chose the firm to manage its global trademark portfolio, the largest in the world, with over 160,000 registrations, marking the first time a multinational company outsourced its trademark management to a law firm on such a large scale.

In July 2013, co-founding partner Russell Baker was named one of American Lawyer's top 50 innovators for pioneering ideas and initiatives that changed the world of BigLaw.

In August 2014, Baker McKenzie revealed it was the first law firm to record $2.5 billion in revenues since the 2008 financial crisis, and that it was also the largest firm in the world by headcount.

The firm's global chair, from 2016 until his death in April 2019, was former London managing partner Paul Rawlinson. He was the 15th global chair, and the first British chair of the firm. Rawlinson succeeded Eduardo C. Leite, who was chair of Baker McKenzie from 2010 to 2016.

As of 2016, when Rawlinson became global chair, Baker McKenzie was the second largest law firm by headcount, and third largest by revenue. Its revenue continued to grow, reaching $2.9 Billion in the fiscal year ended June 2018, and it stayed steady the following year. By then, Baker McKenzie had 77 offices across more than 45 countries, and had over 12,000 employees.

In September 2019 the firm announced that Milton Cheng had been elected as the global chair for four years, starting in October 2019. He was the firm’s first Asian chair and was previously the managing partner of the firm's Hong Kong office, in addition to overseeing business in eight markets across the Asia-Pacific region.

In response to the COVID-19 pandemic, Baker McKenzie initially maintained its overall headcount, but cut the salaries of its U.S. attorneys by 15%. Several months later, Baker McKenzie announced firmwide layoffs.

Announced in June 2025, London-based partner Sunny Mann became the firm's global chair that October. Previously, he was global chair of Baker McKenzie's international trade practice group.

In early 2026, Baker McKenzie announced it was laying off up to a tenth of its global business services workforce (hundreds of roles) as part of a reorganization that it attributed in part to its increased use of artificial intelligence (AI) programs.

== Current size and structure ==
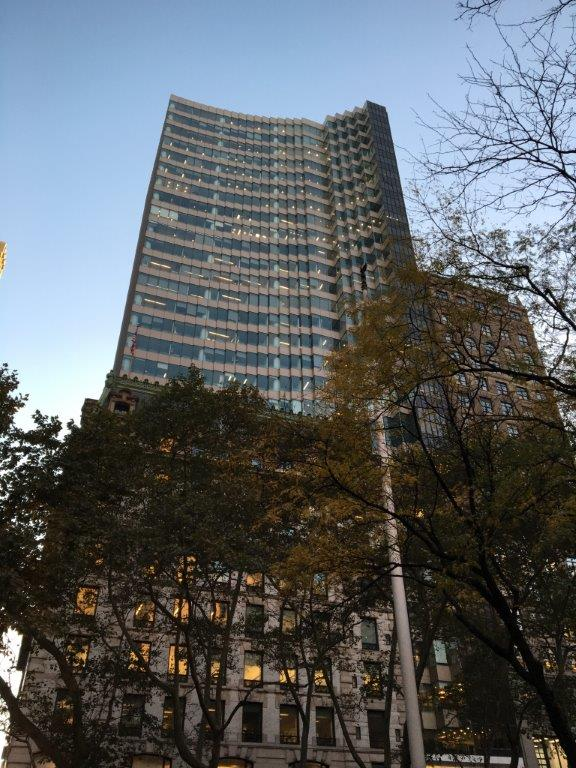
Baker & McKenzie's New York office is located at 452 Fifth Avenue.

As of 2025, Baker McKenzie employs 4,595 attorneys at 71 offices in 45 countries. It is one of the largest law firms by revenue and the largest US-based law firm by head count.

Baker McKenzie is still organized as a Swiss verein with regional profit pools and their related tax, accounting, and partner compensation systems remaining separate, while strategy, branding, information technology and other functions are shared between the constituent partnerships. Baker McKenzie is the only verein that used to be a single partnership, while all of the other vereins were created by firms merging.

== Notable matters and transactions ==
In 2006, Baker McKenzie wrote the amicus brief of the Council of Parent Attorneys & Advocates (COPAA) in support of the petition for a Writ of Certiorari in Winkelman v. Parma City School District, and later, COPAA's amicus brief on the merits. It argued that parents have the right to represent themselves in court to enforce their IDEA rights and protect their children's access to free appropriate public education. This led to a unanimous Supreme Court decision in June 2007 granting parents the right to proceed without counsel on behalf of children with disabilities.

In December 2009, Baker McKenzie won a landmark tax case against the U.S. Internal Revenue Service for Symantec Corporation. The IRS had claimed that the Veritas Software Corporation, which Symantec had subsequently acquired in 2005, owed over $1 billion in back taxes, penalties, and interest as a result of Veritas' non-U.S. operations. Symantec took the case to the U.S. Tax Court where Baker & McKenzie argued that the IRS position was arbitrary, capricious, and unreasonable. In an opinion by Judge Maurice Foley, the court decided in favor of Symantec.

Baker McKenzie represented Microsoft in Microsoft Corporation v. Internal Revenue Service.

In 2012, Baker McKenzie assisted in the overturning of accountant Paul Chambers' conviction in Twitter Joke Trial, prosecuted under the Communications Act of 2003, for a tweet. The Baker McKenzie team, which acted on the case pro bono from 2010, included partners Harry Small, Tom Cassels and Ben Allgrove.

In 2016, Baker McKenzie represented Facebook Inc, in its dispute with the IRS over the value of assets that the company had transferred to its Irish holding company. Lawyers with the U.S. Department of Justice asked for a court order forcing Facebook to provide information to the IRS related to agreements between the company and the holding company, Facebook Ireland Holdings.

For 2015-2022, Reuters ranked the firm first by number of cross-border deals and for the eleventh year in a row the firm was ranked first for deals with emerging market involvement, by both number of announced and completed number of deals.

== Controversies ==
=== Discrimination and sexual harassment ===
In 1986, Geoffrey Bowers, then a New York attorney, filed a complaint with the New York State Division of Human Rights, charging that he had been fired from his job at the Manhattan branch of Baker McKenzie law firm after AIDS-related lesions appeared on his face. The firm maintained that he was fired purely for his performance. Two months after testifying at a hearing on the complaint, he died at age 33. The case was resolved in his favor in late December when Baker McKenzie was ordered to pay $500,000 to Bowers' estate. It was one of the first AIDS discrimination cases to go to a public hearing. Baker & McKenzie appealed but subsequently withdrew the appeal after they negotiated a confidential settlement in 1995 with Bowers' family forbidding parties from ever discussing the case or the terms of the agreement. These events were one inspiration for the film Philadelphia, starring Tom Hanks and Denzel Washington (the script of which was derived from numerous sources).

In 1994, in a seminal case, Rena Weeks, a legal secretary, successfully sued the law firm for sexual harassment after she was harassed by a partner and retaliated against for making a complaint. The trial court ordered the law firm to pay $6.9 million in punitive damages, one of the largest damage awards in history for this type of action. On May 4, 1998, the California Court of Appeal for the First District upheld the trial court's judgment in full, and the Supreme Court of California denied review. Baker & McKenzie did not initiate any investigation into Martin R. Greenstein, the partner who sexually harassed Weeks and at least seven other employees, for over a year after Weeks' suit was filed. Greenstein was eventually terminated by Baker & McKenzie in August 1993 for unrelated professional misconduct. Greenstein was also given a public reproval by the State Bar of California on March 26, 1998.

In September 2022 Baker McKenzie announced that it would separate from its UAE partner, Habib Al Mulla, whose firm merged with Baker McKenzie in 2013, over homophobic Twitter posts in which Mulla described homosexuality as "ugly". The law firm said it wanted to "ensure an inclusive work environment for all".

In 2025 Brooke Radford, a tax attorney formerly employed at Baker McKenzie for three years, and who was previously in a relationship with the son of its Washington, D.C. office managing partner, Maurice Bellan, publicly accused him of sexual assault. On October 2, 2025 the firm responded by filing a defamation suit. On January 22, 2026 Radford filed a complaint against Bellam and the firm with the Superior Court of the District of Columbia.

=== Tax avoidance ===
In 2021, the law firm was listed in the Pandora Papers after the law firm conducted offshoring activities for organizations outside of the United States. One of the actions includes setting up shell companies in Cyprus for RJR Nabisco (which has split up), creating a tax shelter for Nike, as well as moving Facebook's tax headquarters to Ireland, allowing these companies to avoid taxes. Baker McKenzie's clients include Malaysian fugitive Jho Low.

Baker McKenzie has boasted about helping to set up tax-free zones in the UAE, which critics say encourage illicit activity. Baker McKenzie has lobbied against legislation to curb offshore tax avoidance by big companies and lobbied against legislation that would increase due diligence for foreign customers of American banks.

According to the ICIJ, Baker McKenzie is "an architect of the modern tax avoidance system." The company has helped fraudsters, corrupt officials and elites in authoritarian regimes avoid taxes and hide wealth through the use of shell companies, trusts and complex structures in tax havens. The Pandora Papers mentioned Baker McKenzie more than any other major U.S. law firm – the leaks alone revealed that Baker McKenzie was involved in setting up more than 440 offshore companies registered in tax havens.

=== Work with sanctioned Russian companies ===
Baker McKenzie has described itself as the "go-to firm for Russia's largest companies and major foreign investors."

Baker McKenzie has represented Russian state-owned companies Gazprom, Sberbank, VTB Bank, VEB.RF and Sviaz Bank, and the arms manufacturer Rostec.

In 2016, Baker McKenzie worked for Rostec in selling shares in a Mongolian copper mine. The sale triggered a corruption investigation. In 2021, Baker McKenzie advised the Russian Ministry of Finance on a $1.8 billion bond deal.

In October 2021, the Pandora Papers leaks revealed that company represented at least six sanctioned Russian companies. After Russia invaded Ukraine in February 2022, the company initially did not sever ties with Russian state-owned companies, but said it was "reviewing and adjusting our Russia-related operations and client work" to adjust to sanctions. In late March 2022, the company said it was leaving Russia.

== See also ==
- List of largest United States-based law firms by head count
