= Steve Ballmer =

American businessman and investor (born 1956)

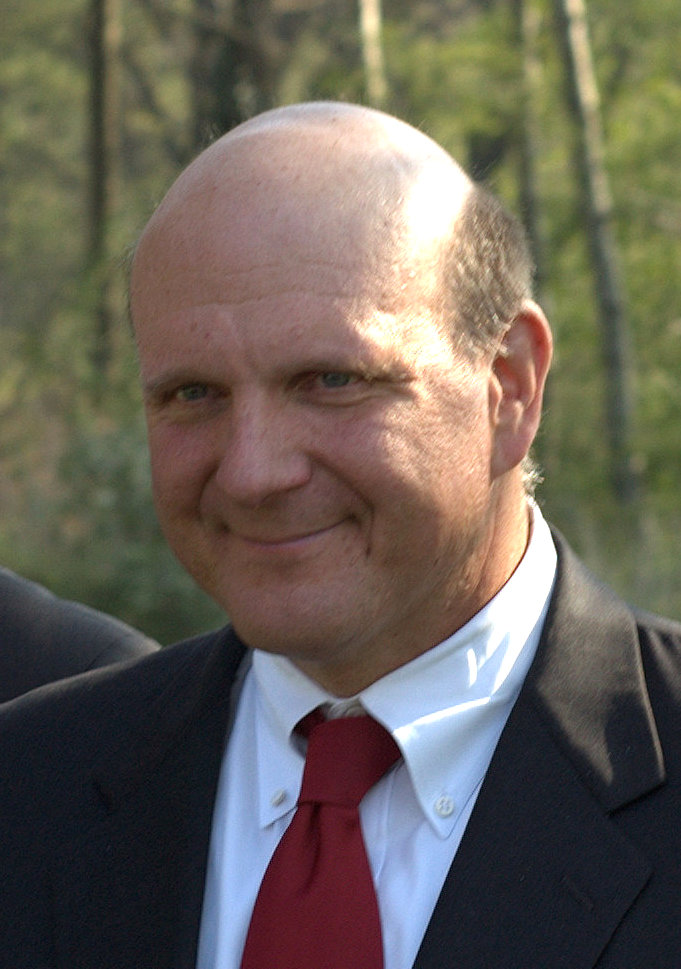
- Ballmer in 2007
- Born: Steven Anthony Ballmer; March 24, 1956 (age 70); Detroit, Michigan, U.S.
- Education: Harvard University (BA)
- Known for: Former CEO of Microsoft; Co-founder of the Ballmer Group; Principal Owner of the Los Angeles Clippers; (suspended)
- Spouse: Connie Snyder (m. 1990)
- Children: 3
- Relatives: Gilda Radner (second cousin)

Steven Anthony Ballmer (/ˈbɔːlmər/ BAWL-mər; born March 24, 1956) is an American businessman and investor who was the chief executive officer (CEO) of Microsoft from 2000 to 2014. He is the owner of the Los Angeles Clippers of the National Basketball Association (NBA), and a co-founder of the Ballmer Group, a philanthropic investment company.

As of February 2026, the Bloomberg Billionaires Index estimated his personal wealth at around $145 billion, making him the thirteenth-richest person in the world, and the Forbes Real-Time Billionaires List ranked him as the fourteenth-richest person with a net worth of $130 billion.

Ballmer was hired by Bill Gates at Microsoft in 1980, and subsequently left the MBA program at Stanford University. He eventually became president in 1998, and replaced Gates as CEO on January 13, 2000. On February 4, 2014, Ballmer retired as CEO and was replaced by Satya Nadella; Ballmer remained on Microsoft's board of directors until August 19, 2014. Under Ballmer's leadership, a 14-year period, the company tripled sales and doubled profits, but lost its market dominance and missed out on 21st-century technology trends such as the ascendance of smartphones in the forms of iPhone and Android.

Until a recent scandal, some claimed Ballmer's ownership of the Los Angeles Clippers as an improvement over previous owner Donald Sterling, citing his willingness to acquire superstar players and finance the construction of Intuit Dome.

== Early life and education ==
Steven Anthony Ballmer was born on March 24, 1956, in Detroit, Michigan, as the son of Beatrice Dworkin (1920–1997) and Frederic Henry (Fritz Hans) Ballmer (1923–2000), a manager at the Ford Motor Company. Frederic was from Zuchwil, Switzerland, and arrived in the United States in 1948. Ballmer's mother was Jewish. Through his mother, Ballmer is a second cousin of actress and comedian Gilda Radner. Ballmer grew up in the community of Farmington Hills, Michigan. Ballmer also lived in Brussels from 1964 to 1967, where he attended the International School of Brussels.

In 1973, he attended college prep and engineering classes at Lawrence Technological University. He graduated as valedictorian from Detroit Country Day School, a private college preparatory school in Beverly Hills, Michigan, with a score of 800 on the mathematical section of the SAT and was a National Merit Scholar.

Ballmer, a first-generation college student, attended Harvard University, where he was a manager for the Harvard Crimson football team and a member of the Fox Club, worked on The Harvard Crimson newspaper as well as the Harvard Advocate, and lived down the hall from fellow sophomore Bill Gates. He scored highly in the William Lowell Putnam Mathematical Competition, an exam sponsored by the Mathematical Association of America, scoring higher than Bill Gates. He graduated magna cum laude with a Bachelor of Arts in applied mathematics and economics in 1977.

Ballmer worked as an assistant product manager at Procter & Gamble for two years, where he shared an office with Jeff Immelt, who later became CEO of General Electric. After briefly trying to write screenplays in Hollywood, he started attending the Stanford Graduate School of Business for his MBA (where Mukesh Ambani was his classmate), but dropped out in 1980 to join Microsoft.

== History with Microsoft ==
Ballmer joined Microsoft on June 11, 1980, and became Microsoft's 30th employee and the first business manager hired by Gates.

Ballmer joined Microsoft with a salary of $50,000 plus 10% of the profit he generated and no equity. However, Ballmer's profit-share started to balloon out of control as Microsoft grew. When Dave Marquardt suggested for Microsoft to reorganize as a corporation instead of a private partnership, he proposed that Ballmer own 8% of the company in exchange for cancelling the profit-sharing model. Paul Allen initially disagreed, but Gates and Allen reached an agreement when Gates agreed to fund an outsized majority of Ballmer's 8% stake. When Microsoft was incorporated in 1981, Ballmer owned 8% of the company. In 2003, Ballmer sold 39.3 million Microsoft shares for about $955 million, reducing his ownership to 4%. The same year, he replaced Microsoft's employee stock options program.

In his first 20 years at the company, Ballmer headed several Microsoft divisions, including operations, operating systems development, and sales and support. In February 1992, he became Executive Vice President for Sales and Support. Ballmer led Microsoft's development of the .NET Framework. Ballmer was promoted to President of Microsoft in July 1998, making him the de facto number two after Gates, then chairman and CEO.

=== Chief executive officer (2000–2014) ===
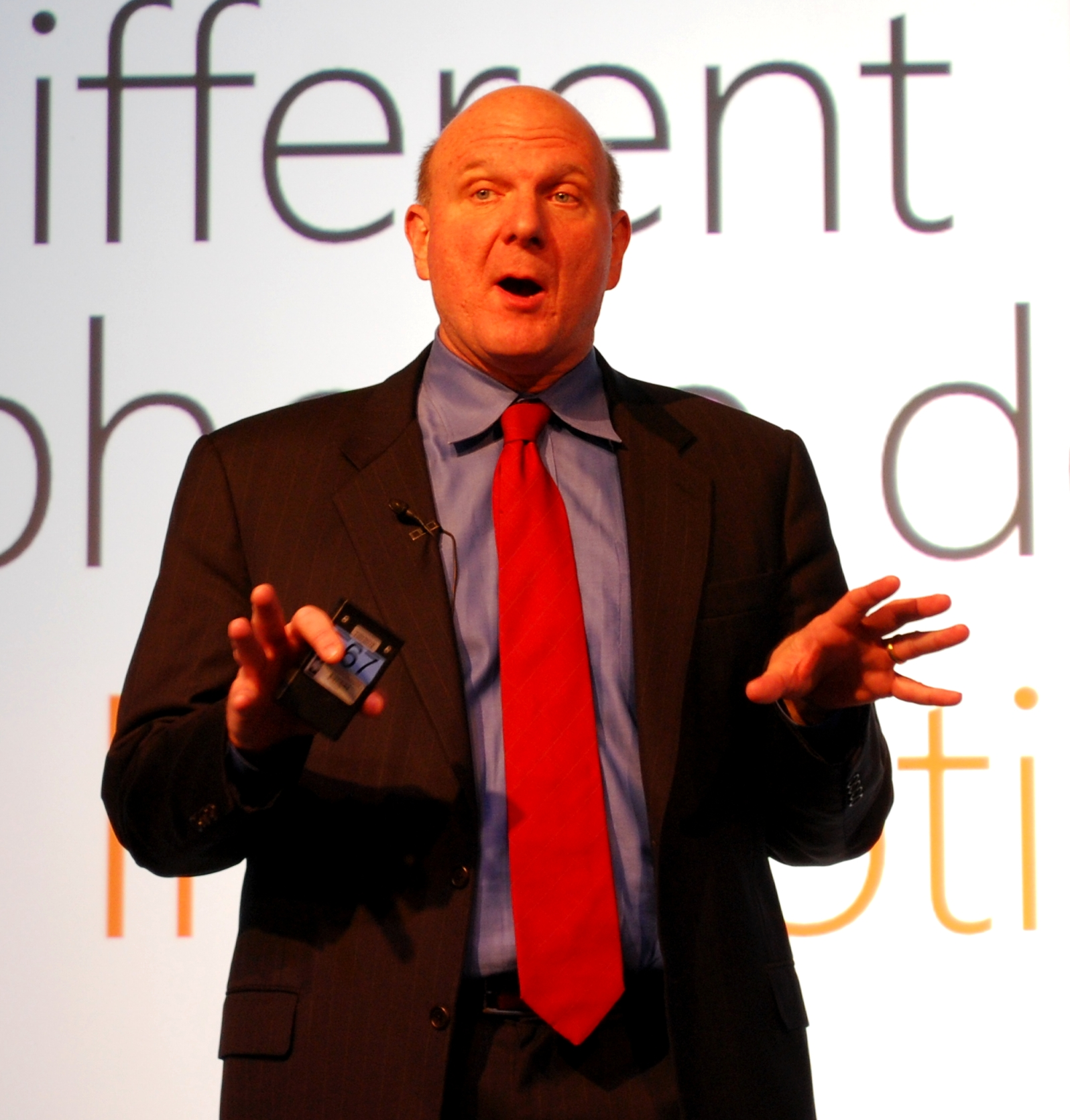
Ballmer at the Mobile World Congress 2010

On January 13, 2000, Ballmer was officially named the chief executive officer; he would shed the title of president in February 2001. As CEO, Ballmer handled company finances and daily operations, but Gates remained chairman of the board and still retained control of the "technological vision" as chief software architect. Gates relinquished day-to-day activities when he stepped down as chief software architect in 2006, while staying on as chairman, and that gave Ballmer the autonomy needed to make major management changes at Microsoft.

When Ballmer took over as CEO, the company was fighting an antitrust lawsuit brought on by the US government and 20 states, plus class-action lawsuits and complaints from rival companies. While it was said that Gates would have continued fighting the federal suit, Ballmer sought to settle these, saying: "Being the object of a lawsuit, effectively, or a complaint from your government is a very awkward, uncomfortable position to be in. It just has all downside. People assume if the government brought a complaint that there's really a problem, and your ability to say we're a good, proper, moral place is tough. It's actually tough, even though you feel that way about yourselves."

Upon becoming CEO, Ballmer required detailed business justification to approve new products, rather than allowing hundreds of products that sounded potentially interesting or trendy. In 2005, he recruited B. Kevin Turner from Walmart, who was the president and CEO of Sam's Club, to become Microsoft's chief operating officer. Turner was hired at Microsoft to lead the company's sales, marketing, and services group and to instill more process and discipline in the company's operations and salesforce.

Since Bill Gates' retirement, Ballmer oversaw a "dramatic shift away from the company's PC-first heritage", replacing most major division heads in order to break down the "talent-hoarding fiefdoms"; in 2012, this led Businessweek to say that the company "arguably [had] the best product lineup in its history". Ballmer drove Microsoft's "connected computing" strategy with acquisitions such as Skype.

Under Ballmer's tenure as CEO, Microsoft's share price stagnated even as the company's annual revenue surged from $25 billion to $70 billion, while its net income increased 215% to $23 billion, and its gross profit of 75 cents on every dollar in sales was double that of Google or IBM. With the company's total annual profit growth of 16.4%, Ballmer's tenure at Microsoft surpassed the performances of other well-known CEOs such as General Electric's Jack Welch (11.2%) and IBM's Louis V. Gerstner Jr. (2%). These gains came from the existing Windows and Office franchises, with Ballmer maintaining their profitability, fending off threats from competitors such as Linux and other open-source operating systems and Google Docs. Ballmer also built half a dozen new businesses, such as the data centers division and the Xbox entertainment and devices division ($8.9 billion), and oversaw the acquisition of Skype. Ballmer also constructed the company's $20 billion Enterprise Business, consisting of new products and services such as Exchange, Windows Server, SQL Server, SharePoint, System Center, and Dynamics CRM, each of which initially faced an uphill battle for acceptance but have emerged as leading or dominant in each category. This diversified product mix helped to offset the company's reliance on PCs and mobile computing devices as the company entered the post-PC era; in reporting quarterly results during April 2013, while Windows Phone 8 and Windows 8 had not managed to increase their market share above single digits, the company increased its profit 19% over the previous quarter in 2012, as the Microsoft Business Division (including Office 365) and Server and Tools division (cloud services) are each larger than the Windows division.

Ballmer attracted criticism for failing to capitalize on several new consumer technologies, forcing Microsoft to play catch-up in the areas of tablet computing, smartphones and music players with mixed results. According to The Wall Street Journal, under Ballmer's watch, "In many cases, Microsoft latched onto technologies like smartphones, touchscreens, 'smart' cars and wristwatches that read sports scores aloud long before Apple or Google did. But it repeatedly killed promising projects if they threatened its cash cows [Windows and Office]." Ballmer was even named one of the worst CEOs of 2013 by the BBC. As a result of these many criticisms, in May 2012, hedge fund manager David Einhorn called on Ballmer to step down as CEO of Microsoft. "His continued presence is the biggest overhang on Microsoft's stock," Einhorn said in reference to Ballmer. In a May 2012 column in Forbes magazine, Adam Hartung described Ballmer as "the worst CEO of a large publicly traded American company", saying he had "steered Microsoft out of some of the fastest growing and most lucrative tech markets (mobile music, headsets and tablets)".

In 2009, and for the first time since Bill Gates resigned from day-to-day management at Microsoft, Ballmer delivered the opening keynote at CES.

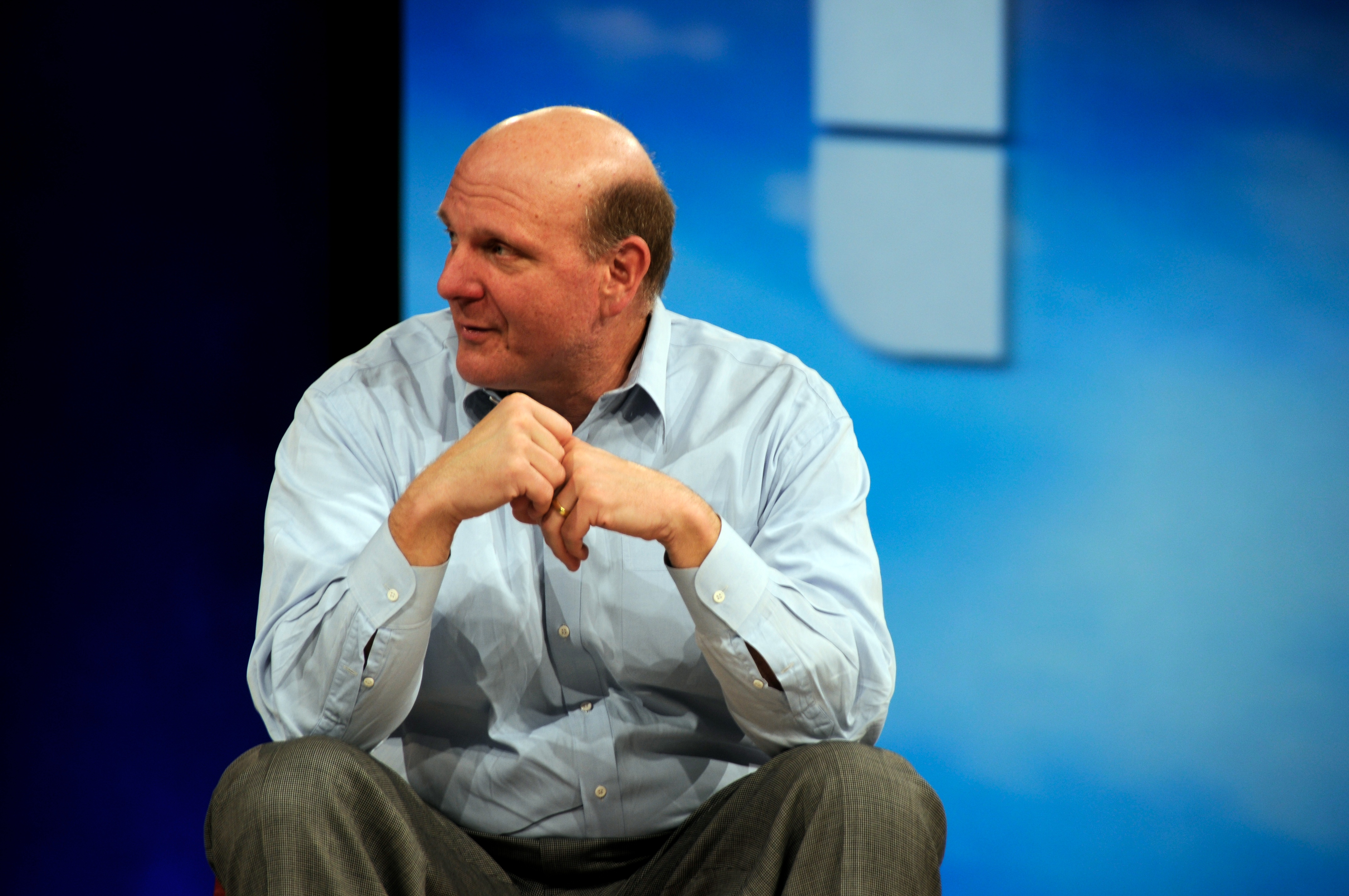
Ballmer at MIX in 2008

As part of his plans to expand on hardware, on June 19, 2012, Ballmer revealed Microsoft's first ever computer device, a tablet called Microsoft Surface at an event held in Hollywood, Los Angeles. He followed this by announcing the company's purchase of Nokia's mobile phone division in September 2013, his last major acquisition for Microsoft as CEO.

On August 23, 2013, Microsoft announced that Ballmer would retire within the next 12 months. A special committee that included Bill Gates would decide on the next CEO.

There was a list of potential successors to Ballmer as Microsoft CEO, but all had departed the company: Jim Allchin, Brad Silverberg, Paul Maritz, Nathan Myhrvold, Greg Maffei, Pete Higgins, Jeff Raikes, J. Allard, Robbie Bach, Bill Veghte, Ray Ozzie, Bob Muglia and Steven Sinofsky. B. Kevin Turner, Microsoft's Chief Operating Officer (COO), was considered by some to be a de facto number two to Ballmer, with Turner described as having a strong grasp of business and operations but lacking technological vision. On February 4, 2014, Satya Nadella succeeded Ballmer as CEO.

=== Public image ===
Although as a child he was so shy that he would hyperventilate before Hebrew school, Ballmer is known for his energetic and exuberant personality, which is meant to motivate employees and partners, shouting so much that he needed surgery on his vocal cords.

Ballmer's excited stage appearances at Microsoft events were widely circulated on the Internet as viral videos. One of his earliest known viral videos was a parody video, produced for Microsoft employees in 1986, promoting Windows 1.0 in the style of a Crazy Eddie commercial. Ballmer and Brian Valentine later repeated this in a spoof promotion of Windows XP.

A widely circulated video was his entrance on stage at Microsoft's 25th anniversary event in September 2000, where Ballmer jumped across the stage and shouted, "I love this company!" Another viral video was captured at a Windows 2000 developers' conference, featuring a visibly perspiring Ballmer repeatedly chanting the word "developers".

=== Relationship with Bill Gates ===
Ballmer was Gates' best man at his wedding to Melinda French, and the two men described their relationship as a marriage. They were so close for years that another Microsoft executive described it as a mind meld. Combative debates—a part of Microsoft's corporate culture—that many observers believed were personal arguments occurred within the relationship; while Gates was glad in 2000 that Ballmer was willing to become CEO so he could focus on technology, The Wall Street Journal reported that there was tension surrounding the transition of authority. Things became so bitter that, on one occasion, Gates stormed out of a meeting after a shouting match in which Ballmer jumped to the defense of several colleagues, according to an individual present at the time. After the exchange, Ballmer seemed "remorseful", the person said. Once Gates leaves, "I'm not going to need him for anything. That's the principle", Ballmer said. "Use him, yes, need him, no".

In October 2014, a few months after Ballmer left his post at Microsoft, a Vanity Fair profile stated that Ballmer and Gates no longer talk to each other due to animosity over Ballmer's resignation. In a November 2016 interview, Ballmer said he and Gates have "drifted apart" ever since, saying that they always had a "brotherly relationship" beforehand. He said that his push into the hardware business, specifically smartphones, which Gates did not support, contributed to their relationship breakdown.

=== Retirement ===
After saying in 2008 that he intended to remain CEO for another decade, Ballmer announced his retirement in 2013, after losing billions of dollars in acquisitions and on the Surface tablet. Microsoft's stock price rebounded on the news.

Ballmer says that he regretted the lack of focus on Windows Mobile in the early 2000s, leaving Microsoft a distant third in the smartphone market [in 2013]. Moreover, he attributed the success of the expensively-priced iPhones to carrier subsidies. He went on to say,

People like to point to this quote where I said iPhones will never sell, because the price at $600 or $700 was too high. And there was a business model innovation by Apple to get it essentially built into the monthly cellphone bill.

Ballmer called the acquisition of the mobile phone division of Nokia his "toughest decision" during his tenure.

Ballmer hosted his last company meeting in September 2013, and stepped down from the company's board of directors in August 2014.

On December 24, 2014, the Seattle Times reported that the IRS sued Ballmer, Craig Mundie, Jeff Raikes, Jim Allchin, Orlando Ayala and David Guenther in an effort to compel them to testify in Microsoft's corporate tax audit. The IRS had been looking into how Microsoft and other companies deal with transfer pricing.

In December 2023, CNN estimated that Ballmer was set to collect $1 billion in dividends from his ongoing ownership of Microsoft stock, after the company announced an increase in its dividend to $3 per share.

== Other positions ==
Ballmer was a director of Accenture and a general partner of Accenture SCA from 2001 to 2006. Details about his remuneration in these positions remain undisclosed.

== On competing companies and software ==
=== Apple ===
In 2007, Ballmer said, "iPhone is the most expensive phone in the world and it doesn't have a keyboard... There's no chance that the iPhone is going to get any significant market share. No chance..."

Speaking at a conference in NYC in 2009, Ballmer criticized Apple's pricing, saying, "Now I think the tide has turned back the other direction (against Apple). The economy is helpful. Paying an extra $500 for a computer in this environment—same piece of hardware—paying $500 more to get a logo on it? I think that's a more challenging proposition for the average person than it used to be."

On September 25, 2014, Ballmer said he would bar the team from using Apple products such as iPads, and replace them with Microsoft products. It has been reported that he had previously also barred his family from using iPhones.

In 2015, when Apple had become the world's most valuable company, Ballmer called Microsoft's decision to invest in Apple to save it from bankruptcy in 1997 as the "craziest thing we ever did".

In 2016, Ballmer revisited his iPhone statements, saying, "People like to point to this quote...but the reason I said that was [that] the price of $600–$700 was too high". He said he did not realize that Apple was going to have phone carriers build the cost into the customer's monthly bill.

=== Free and open-source software ===
In July 2000, Ballmer called Linux "a tough competitor" in some server markets, and said that it had "characteristics of communism that people love so very, very much about it", referring to the fact it was free. In June 2001 he called Linux "good competition" in an interview, but criticized government funding for open-source work because of licensing issues and said that Linux was a "cancer ... in the intellectual property sense". In 2006, he claimed that it infringed Microsoft's intellectual property. Ballmer used the notion of "viral" licensing terms to express his concern over the fact that the GNU General Public License (GPL) employed by such software requires that all derivative software be under the GPL or a compatible license. In April 2003 he interrupted a skiing holiday in Switzerland to personally plead with the mayor of Munich not to switch to Linux. But he did not succeed with this and Munich switched to LiMux, despite his offering a 35% discount at his lobbying visit.

In March 2016, Ballmer changed his stance on Linux, saying that he supports his successor Satya Nadella's open source commitments. He maintained that his comments in 2001 were right at the time but that times have changed.

=== Google ===
In 2005, Microsoft sued Google for hiring one of its previous vice presidents, Kai-Fu Lee, claiming it was in violation of his one-year non-compete clause in his contract. Mark Lucovsky, who left for Google in 2004, alleged in a sworn affidavit to a Washington state court that Ballmer became enraged upon being told by Lucovsky that he was about to leave Microsoft for Google, picked up a chair, and threw it across his office, and that, referring to then Google Executive Chairman Eric Schmidt (who had previously worked for competitors Sun and Novell), Ballmer vowed to "kill Google."

Ballmer has described Lucovsky's account of the incident as a "gross exaggeration of what actually took place".

During the 2011 Web 2.0 Summit in San Francisco, he said: "You don't need to be a computer scientist to use a Windows Phone and you do to use an Android phone ... It is hard for me to be excited about the Android phones."

In 2013, Ballmer said that Google was a "monopoly" that should be pressured from market competition authorities.

== Sports ==
On March 6, 2008, Seattle mayor Greg Nickels announced that a local ownership group involving Ballmer made a "game-changing" commitment to invest $150 million in cash toward a proposed $300 million renovation of KeyArena and were ready to purchase the Seattle SuperSonics from the Professional Basketball Club LLC in order to keep the team in Seattle. However, this initiative failed, and the SuperSonics relocated to Oklahoma City, Oklahoma, where they now play as the Oklahoma City Thunder.

In June 2012, Ballmer was an investor in Chris R. Hansen's proposal to build a new arena in the SoDo neighborhood of Seattle and bring the SuperSonics back to Seattle. On January 9, 2013, Ballmer and Hansen led a group of investors in an attempt to purchase the Sacramento Kings from the Maloof family and relocate them to Seattle for an estimated $650 million. However, this attempt also fell through.

Following the Donald Sterling scandal in May 2014, Ballmer was the highest bidder in an attempt to purchase the Los Angeles Clippers for a reported price of $2 billion, which was then the second-highest bid for a sports franchise in North American sports history (after the $2.15 billion sale of the Los Angeles Dodgers in 2012). After a California court confirmed the authority of Shelly Sterling to sell the team, it was announced on August 12, 2014, that Ballmer would become the Los Angeles Clippers owner.

In March 2020, Ballmer agreed to buy The Forum in Inglewood, California. The purchase would allow him to build Intuit Dome in the nearby area since plans for a new Clippers' arena were opposed by the former owners of The Forum.

In a survey conducted by The Athletic in December 2020, Ballmer was voted the best owner in basketball.

In September 2025, journalist Pablo Torre broke the Los Angeles Clippers salary cap scandal, reporting that Steve Ballmer and the Los Angeles Clippers used Aspiration as a means of paying Kawhi Leonard an extra $28 million, circumventing the NBA salary cap. John Karalis of the Boston Sports Journal later reported that Kawhi also received an additional $20 million in Aspiration company stock. Ballmer and the Clippers claimed innocence, declaring they were the victims of a fraud perpetrated by Aspiration co-founder Joe Sanberg. However, it was revealed that both Ballmer and Clippers co-owner Dennis Wong kept investing money into Aspiration and Golden State Opportunity Foundation (Sanberg's charity) after Aspiration's financial issues and fraud had publicly been exposed. Adam Silver announced the NBA hired Wachtell, Lipton, Rosen & Katz to investigate Torre's claims of salary cap circumvention. and found the Clippers, and Ballmer guilty of cap circumvention, issuing the largest punishment in NBA history and banning Ballmer for one year. The NBA previously investigated Kawhi Leonard's free agency deal with the Clippers in 2019. Additionally, Ballmer's Clippers were fined $250,000 in 2015 for circumventing the NBA salary cap, when they offered an unauthorized business opportunity during their pursuit of free agent DeAndre Jordan. In January 2026, Ballmer's legal team formally filed for his dismissal from the lawsuit.

== Wealth and taxes ==
In 2021, ProPublica documented how Ballmer is using his ownership of various sports teams as a means to lower his federal income tax to as low as 12%, compared to around 35% for the athletes playing on the team. The report exposes how the Clippers were profitable before their acquisition by Ballmer, but then reported $700 million in losses for tax purposes in following years.

In 2023, ProPublica did another report, about Ballmer's usage of wash sales helped by Goldman Sachs, under the label "Tax Advantaged Loss Harvesting", resulting in tax savings of more than half a billion dollars over 5 years.

As of 5 March 2025, Bloomberg Billionaires Index estimated his personal wealth at around $136 billion, making him the tenth-richest person in the world, and the Forbes Real-Time Billionaires List ranked him as the twelfth-richest person with a net worth of $117.8 billion.

== Philanthropy ==
On November 12, 2014, it was announced that Ballmer and his wife Connie donated $50 million to the University of Oregon. Connie Ballmer is a University of Oregon alumna and previously was on the institution's board of trustees. The funds will go toward the university's $2 billion fundraising effort, and will focus on scholarships, public health research and advocacy, and external branding/communications. On November 13, 2014, it was announced that Ballmer would provide a gift, estimated at $60 million, to Harvard University's computer science department. The gift would allow the department to hire new faculty, and hopefully increase the national stature of the program. Ballmer previously donated $10 million to the same department in 1994, in a joint gift with Bill Gates.

In 2022, Ballmer donated $425 million to the University of Oregon to fund a new institute that addresses children's behavioral and mental health needs. It was named the Ballmer Institute for Children’s Behavioral Health.

Ballmer is on the World Chairman's Council of the Jewish National Fund (JNF), signifying that he has donated at least $1 million to the JNF.

=== Ballmer Group ===
In 2015, he and his wife co-founded Ballmer Group, a philanthropic investment company that aims to help children, particularly those in poor families, achieve economic mobility. The company has a presence in Washington state, Los Angeles County, and the Detroit metro area.

=== USAFacts ===
Ballmer launched USAFacts in 2017, a not-for-profit organization whose goal is to enable people to understand US government revenue, spending and societal impact. He is reported to have contributed $10 million to fund teams of researchers who populated the website's database with official data.

== Personal life ==
Ballmer married Connie Snyder in 1990, and the couple has three sons, Sam Ballmer, Aaron Ballmer, and Peter Ballmer.

The Ballmers live primarily in Hunts Point, Washington. They own multiple homes in the Seattle area, and a total of 10 properties near Coupeville, Washington, as of 2024.

== See also ==
- List of people banned or suspended by the NBA

Business positions
Preceded by Bill Gates	Chief Executive Officer of Microsoft; 2000–2014	Succeeded by Satya Nadella
Sporting positions
Preceded by Donald Sterling	Los Angeles Clippers principal owner 2014–present	Incumbent
