= Ballmer Group =

Family office of the Ballmers

Ballmer Giving LLC
- Trade name: Ballmer Group
- Company type: Limited liability company
- Industry: Family office
- Founded: 2015; 11 years ago
- Founders: Steve Ballmer; Connie Ballmer
- Headquarters: Bellevue, Washington, U.S.
- AUM: US$85 billion (2023)
- Website: ballmergroup.org

The Ballmer Group is an American investment company based in Bellevue, Washington, that serves as a family office to manage the wealth of Steve Ballmer, the former CEO of Microsoft. The purpose of the Ballmer Group is to advance economic mobility.

The Ballmer Group has a presence in southeast Michigan, Washington state, and Los Angeles County.

== Background ==
After retiring from his role at Microsoft, Steve Ballmer decided to join his wife, Connie, in philanthropy, and the two co-founded the Ballmer Group in 2015.

Ballmer Group funding typically lasts for at least three years and their use is unrestricted. However, before providing grants, the Ballmer Group will perform significant data-based due diligence on the organizations as well as tracking their commitment and ability to deliver.

The Ballmer Group has also been involved in backing advocacy groups related to policies on criminal justice issues, including bail reform and expunging criminal records. It has also regularly spoken with lawmakers such as Karen Bass.

The Ballmer Group uses a "wraparound approach,” which emphasizes community action rather than being directly involved with educational issues such as K-12 personalized learning, academic standards, and curriculum. One of its largest donations was made to StriveTogether, a network of local communities helping children with economic mobility.

The Ballmer Group is structured as a limited liability company. The company has been noted as having less transparency than other peers. Officials from the Ballmer Group have told Education Week, they would not commit to publicly disclose all the organization's grants, investments, lobbying work, or support for elected officials and campaigns.

In 2016, the Ballmer Group expanded its operations into Los Angeles County. In 2017, it expanded operations into the Detroit area,

== Notable funding and grants ==
In 2018, the Ballmer Group announced a $59 million, five-year investment in Social Solutions, a software company that tracks data related to nonprofit and government social service agencies. The Ballmer Group also donated $16 million to 18 nonprofits in southeast Michigan, including the American Heart Association and Planned Parenthood.

In 2022, the Ballmer Group donated to $425 million to the University of Oregon to create the Ballmer Institute for Children's Behavioral Health. It aimed to tackle mental health issues facing children.

In February 2023, the Ballmer Group stated it would provide commitments of up to $165 million to Communities in Schools to build 1,000 additional majority-low-income schools. In April 2023, the Ballmer Group provided $43 million to the state of Washington to increase the access to early childhood education. It also provided $38 million to the University of Washington to fund early childhood educator scholarships. In May 2023, the Ballmer Group stated it would provide $42.5 million over the next five years to support more than 100 Black-led nonprofits focused on improving economic mobility.
