= Minnesota Timberwolves failed move to New Orleans =

Attempt to move the Minnesota Timberwolves to New Orleans

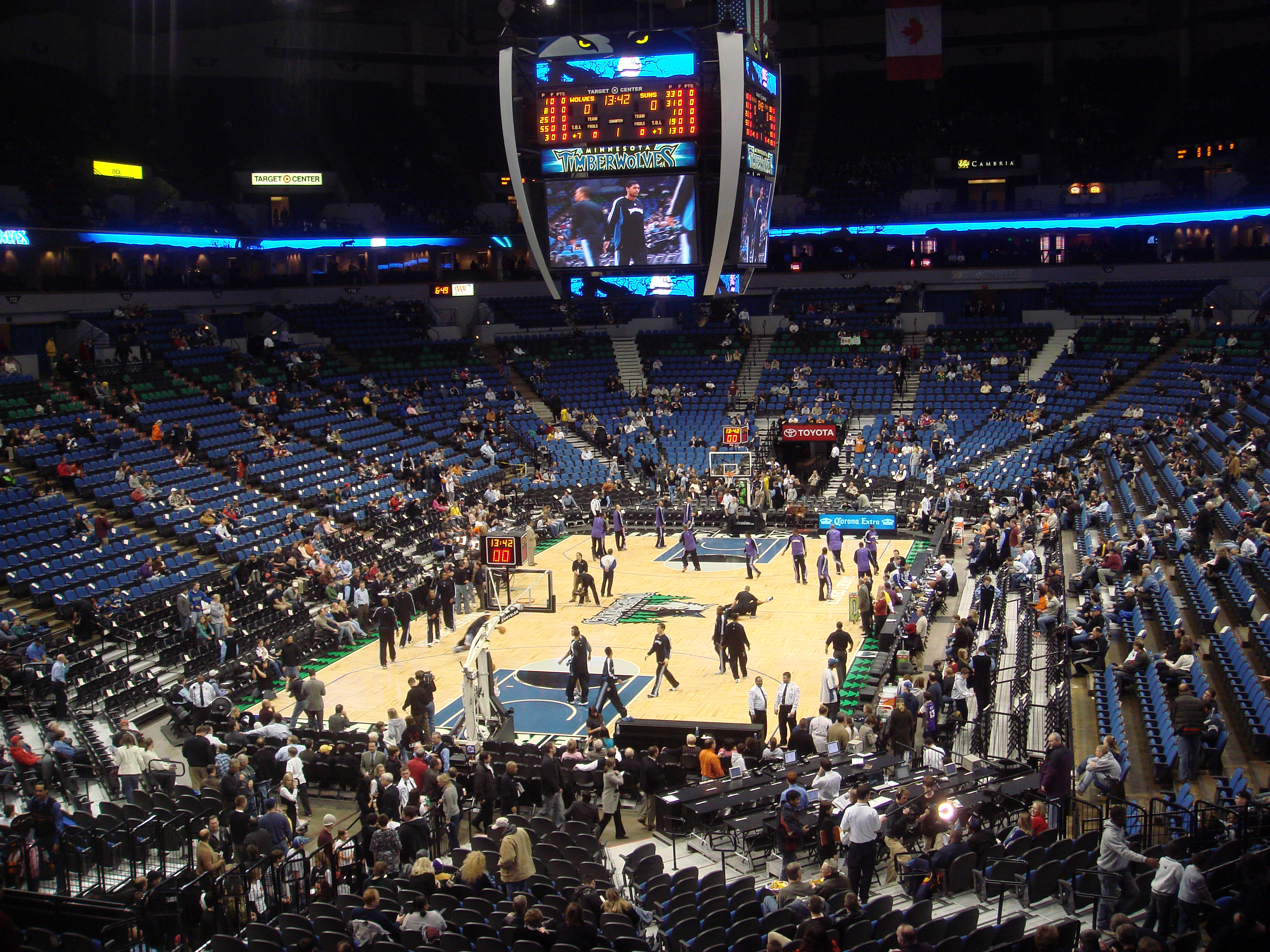
The interior of the Target Center

In 1994, several groups were involved in an attempt to move the Minnesota Timberwolves of the National Basketball Association (NBA) from Minneapolis, Minnesota, to New Orleans, Louisiana. The move would have been the second exodus of a Minneapolis-based franchise in as many years, after its National Hockey League (NHL) franchise moved to Dallas in 1993. Timberwolves owners Marv Wolfenson and Harvey Ratner were considering selling the team due to problems with the mortgage on the four-year-old Target Center, the arena built to enable Minneapolis' 1989 entry into the NBA. The attempted move led Glen Taylor, businessman and former Minnesota State Senator, to buy the team and keep it in Minneapolis.

After their failed courting of the Timberwolves, New Orleans wooed the Vancouver Grizzlies, which eventually moved to Memphis, and the Charlotte Hornets, which arrived in 2002. The New Orleans Hornets renamed themselves the New Orleans Pelicans in 2013, whereupon the city of Charlotte reclaimed the Hornets name. As part of a settlement, the second incarnation of the Charlotte Hornets reclaimed the records and history of the 1988–2002 Charlotte Hornets.

== Move speculation ==
By the 1994 NBA All-Star Game, there was speculation as to whether or not the Timberwolves would remain in Minneapolis following the 1994–95 season. On February 11, 1994, NBA commissioner David Stern announced that he and his representatives would serve as mediators in an effort to resolve issues related to the debt owed on the Target Center, the Timberwolves home arena. The Timberwolves ownership was seeking a public or private entity to purchase the $73 million remaining on the arena's mortgage; otherwise, the team would be sold and in all likelihood moved from Minnesota. Although mediation talks were just beginning to keep the team in place, by the following week it was revealed that ownership had met with representatives from San Diego, Nashville and New Orleans to discuss the franchise's potential move. By late February, New Orleans emerged as the team's likely new home if a deal could not be reached to keep the team in Minneapolis. The potential ownership group Top Rank (headlined by Fred Hofheinz and Bob Arum) signed a letter of intent to purchase the team and move it to New Orleans if debt issues at the Target Center were not resolved.

Local opposition grew to a perceived bailout of multi-millionaire ownership. A citizens opposition group called Don't Target Us (alluding to the Target Center) formed to oppose a public purchase of the facility, and a poll showed that 60 percent of the public opposed intervention. However, support for intervention on the arena issue began to take shape as well, with several at the local and state level stating their intention to make a deal happen. Additionally, businesses near the arena started a campaign to keep the team in Minneapolis.

While political maneuvering was continuing in Minnesota, by early April it was reported that Nashville had become favored over New Orleans the Timberwolves' move. The Nashville offer became the preferred option as it included $80 million for the franchise from Gaylord Entertainment and an additional $20 million to be paid to the city of Minneapolis to pay down debt at the Target Center. New Orleans later reemerged as the lead candidate for moving by the end of April when Top Rank announced a purchase price of $152.5 million. By early May, the Minnesota state legislature approved a bill that would use public funds to purchase the Target Center for $48 million. The purchase by the state was contingent on ownership agreeing to keep the franchise in the arena for 30 years. However, owners could not find a local suitor willing to pay what Top Rank had offered for the franchise, setting the stage for a move.

== Proposed move to New Orleans ==
After months of speculation, on May 23, 1994, Top Rank bought the franchise for $152.5 million with the intention of moving it to New Orleans. The purchase followed an agreement between Top Rank and Timberwolves owners that allowed Top Rank to buy the franchise if no local ownership groups were found by May 20, 1994. On June 6, 1994, Top Rank filed the paperwork to the NBA seeking to move the Timberwolves to New Orleans for the 1994–95 NBA season. The filings also identified Fred Hofheinz as the sole Top Rank stockholder, with Houston lawyer John O'Quinn and stockbroker Robert Higley serving as the team's major partners.

With the timber wolf being a species not native to Louisiana, there was much speculation as to what the moved franchise would be called. A few were proposed; New Orleans Mayor Marc Morial wanted the Rhythm, while Louisiana Governor Edwin Edwards suggested the Angels. After speculation as to where the team would play their home games while a new arena was built, Superdome officials notified the league that enough dates would be available to schedule 41 home games at the dome for the 1994–95 season. Before this announcement, the team was rumored to play games at the Lakefront Arena, the Pete Maravich Assembly Center in Baton Rouge, or the Mississippi Coast Coliseum in Biloxi, Mississippi when the Superdome was unavailable.

== Remaining in Minneapolis ==
On June 15, 1994, the National Basketball Association's franchise relocation committee voted unanimously to block the sale of the franchise to Top Rank resulting in the Timberwolves remaining in Minneapolis through at least the 1994–95 season. Top Rank's offer was rejected by the league due to questions surrounding their financing plan. The $152 million purchase price would have been paid for through $40 million from unknown investors; up to $76.25 million in loans from banks that had yet to make commitments; and $50 million or more from undisclosed sources based on projected revenues from the un-built arena in New Orleans. Also, the league filed a lawsuit in U.S. District Court in Minneapolis seeking an injunction against any transfer of the team from Minnesota. On June 21, 1994, the league officially denied sale of the franchise to Top Rank resulting in the Timberwolves remaining in Minneapolis. On June 28, 1994, Top Rank would file a counter-suit in Louisiana Civil District Court. The suit sought to have ownership fulfill their contractual obligation to sell the team to Top Rank. The following day, federal district court ruled that the franchise was to remain in Minneapolis through June 15, 1995.

After over eight months of working to purchase the franchise, local businessman Bill Sexton withdrew his bid to purchase the Timberwolves in August. However, Glen Taylor later headed a group to purchase the team with the NBA approving the transaction in October 1994. By 1995 Top Rank would enter involuntary bankruptcy and as a result, the NBA rejected their offer securing the franchise in Minneapolis.

In the years following the attempt to move the Timberwolves, the New Orleans Regional Basketball Alliance sought to lure an existing franchise to the city. After completion of the New Orleans Arena, the Alliance led efforts to move the Vancouver Grizzlies to the city. The New Orleans bid ultimately lost to Memphis, and by early 2002 the city was wooing the Charlotte Hornets after a failed referendum for a new arena in Charlotte. On May 10, 2002, the NBA voted in favor of the move of the Hornets to New Orleans, returning NBA basketball to the city for the first time since the New Orleans Jazz moved to Salt Lake City in 1979. In November 2002, the Timberwolves made their first trip to New Orleans since the failed efforts of the Top Rank group in 1994.

== See also ==
- Sacramento Kings failed relocation attempts
- List of relocated NBA teams
- Relocation of major professional sports teams in the United States and Canada
