= Paul Rawlinson =

British lawyer (died 2019)

Paul Rawlinson was a British intellectual property lawyer who was the Global Chair of Baker McKenzie, one of the world's largest law firms.

== Early life ==
Rawlinson was born and brought up with his older brother Adrian in Chorlton-cum-Hardy, Manchester, England. He attended St Bedes School. He received his B.A. Law from the University of Kent at Canterbury in 1984, before graduating from the University of Paris XI and the College of Law at Guildford, respectively. The inquest into his death stated that he died by suicide after suffering from an acute depressive illness, in April 2019 aged 56.

== Career ==
Based in London, Rawlinson was Baker McKenzie's first British Chair.

Rawlinson joined Baker McKenzie in 1986, focusing on intellectual property. He was made partner in 1996, and worked for a time in the firm's Hong Kong office. Rawlinson served as London Managing Partner from 2013 to October 2016, advising global clients on strategies for protecting and enforcing their IP rights. Rawlinson counted Cisco, L’Oréal, Hewlett-Packard, JCB, British American Tobacco, and Eli Lilly as his clients, handling their UK legal matters and, for some, coordinating their global IP needs.

Rawlinson was a member of the International AntiCounterfeiting Coalition, the Business Alliance Against Counterfeiting and Anti-Piracy, the French Trade Mark & Design Association, and the International Trademark Association. Rawlinson served on the Baker McKenzie Policy Committee and also led its Global Intellectual Property practice group from 2004 to 2010.

After his appointment as Global Chair in October 2016, Rawlinson was one of the most visible global law firm leaders. Baker McKenzie is an active supporter of the World Economic Forum and Rawlinson was interviewed by many international media while at their Davos event. He was a board member for the Thomson Reuters Trust Law Foundation and was also an active supporter of World Business Council on Sustainable Development. Paul was ranked as the leading lawyer in the Male Champion of Women in Business in the UK by the Financial Times and HERoes, a gender-equality initiative and was the sole private sector representative at the United Nations launch event for "Champions of the Global Equal Pay Coalition".

== Personal life ==
Rawlinson has two children. He spoke Spanish French and English. His older brother, Adrian, is a medical doctor in San Francisco.
