= Sonics Arena =

Proposed arena in Seattle

Coordinates: 47°35′14″N 122°19′59.57″W

- Interactive map of Sonics Arena
- Address: 1700 First Avenue South
- Location: Seattle, Washington
- Capacity: 19,000–20,000

Construction
- Cost: $550 million
- Architect: HOK

Website
- www.sonicsarena.com

Sonics Arena was a proposed multi-purpose arena to be constructed in the SoDo neighborhood of Seattle, Washington, United States. The arena would have hosted basketball, ice hockey, and concerts. The proposal called for an arena with a capacity of around 19,000 to 20,000 seats. It was part of a larger plan to return the Seattle SuperSonics (NBA) franchise, along with adding a potential National Hockey League (NHL) franchise, to the city of Seattle. The proposal was rejected in favor of redeveloping KeyArena into Climate Pledge Arena.

== Background ==
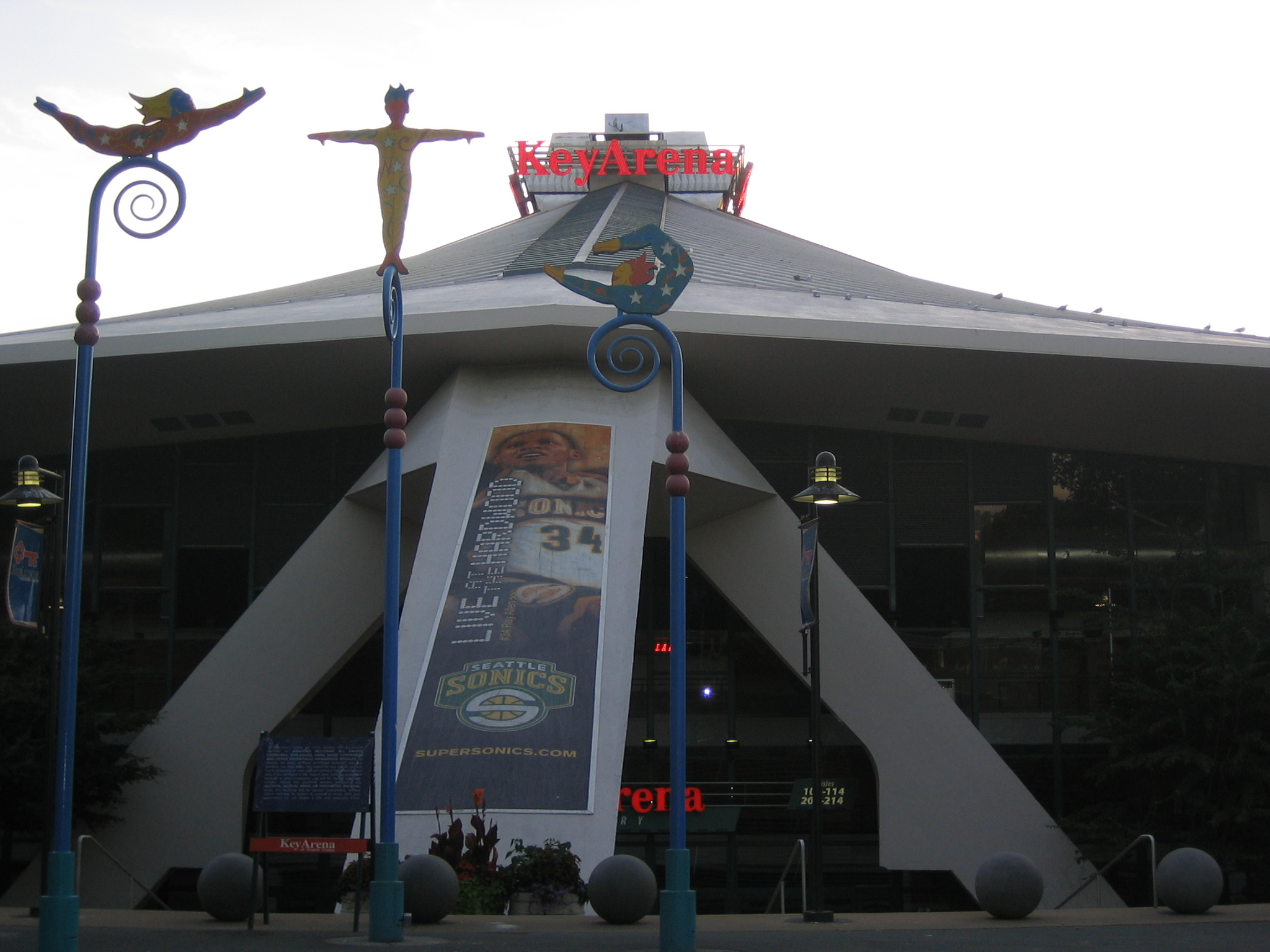
The east entrance to KeyArena.

The largest arena by seating capacity in the greater Seattle metropolitan area is Climate Pledge Arena. Originally built to be the Washington State pavilion for the Seattle World's Fair in 1962, after the end of the Fair it became the Seattle Center Coliseum. It was remodeled and renamed KeyArena in 1995, then remodeled again and given its current name in 2021. KeyArena was the home of the SuperSonics from 1967 to 2008, the duration of the NBA team's existence in Seattle. The SuperSonics relocated to Oklahoma City, Oklahoma, in 2008 and are currently known as the Thunder.

The KeyArena (then named the Seattle Center Coliseum) was the home of the minor professional Western Hockey League Seattle Totems from 1963 to 1975. KeyArena was later home to the Seattle Thunderbirds of the major junior Western Hockey League from 1977 to 2009. In 2009, the Thunderbirds relocated to the ShoWare Center in nearby Kent. Several professional hockey teams have played in Seattle since 1915. The first was the Seattle Metropolitans, who played in the Seattle Ice Arena from 1915 to 1924 and became the first American team to win the Stanley Cup in 1917. Other professional hockey teams included the Seattle Eskimos, Seattle Ironmen, Seattle Bombers, and Seattle Americans.

Climate Pledge Arena's current tenants include the Seattle Kraken NHL franchise, the Seattle University Redhawks athletic program, the Women's National Basketball Association (WNBA) Seattle Storm, and the Rat City Rollergirls. Climate Pledge Arena also hosts concerts, circuses, professional wrestling, and other events.

Other arenas in Seattle include the Alaska Airlines Arena at Hec Edmundson Pavilion, home of the Washington Huskies; and Mercer Arena, a performing arts venue. Angel of the Winds Arena, in Everett, is the home of the IFL's Everett Raptors and the WHL's Everett Silvertips.

A key reason given for the Sonics' relocation to Oklahoma City in 2008 was KeyArena's small size and lack of amenities. Before moving the team, the SuperSonics' ownership group proposed that a new arena be built in Renton using $500 million in public funds, but an agreement was not made. In an attempt to keep the Sonics in Seattle, a group of investors led by former Microsoft CEO Steve Ballmer promised to pay half of the $300 million needed for a proposed remodel of KeyArena (with Seattle and King County financing the other half), but an agreement was not reached.

On January 21, 2013, the Sacramento Kings were sold to a Seattle-based ownership group, on the condition that the NBA Board of Governors approve the sale to San Francisco hedge fund manager Chris Hansen. These reports were by Hansen, the Maloof family, and the NBA. However, on May 15, 2013, the NBA voted 22–8 to reject the Kings' proposed relocation to Seattle. The day after the NBA's decision, the Maloof family reached agreement to sell the Kings to a group led by Silicon Valley tech entrepreneur Vivek Ranadivé for a record NBA franchise valuation of $535 million and the team stayed in Sacramento.

Despite the failed attempt to move the Kings, Hansen's plans to bring an NBA team back to Seattle, possibly by expansion, are continuing.

== Proposal ==
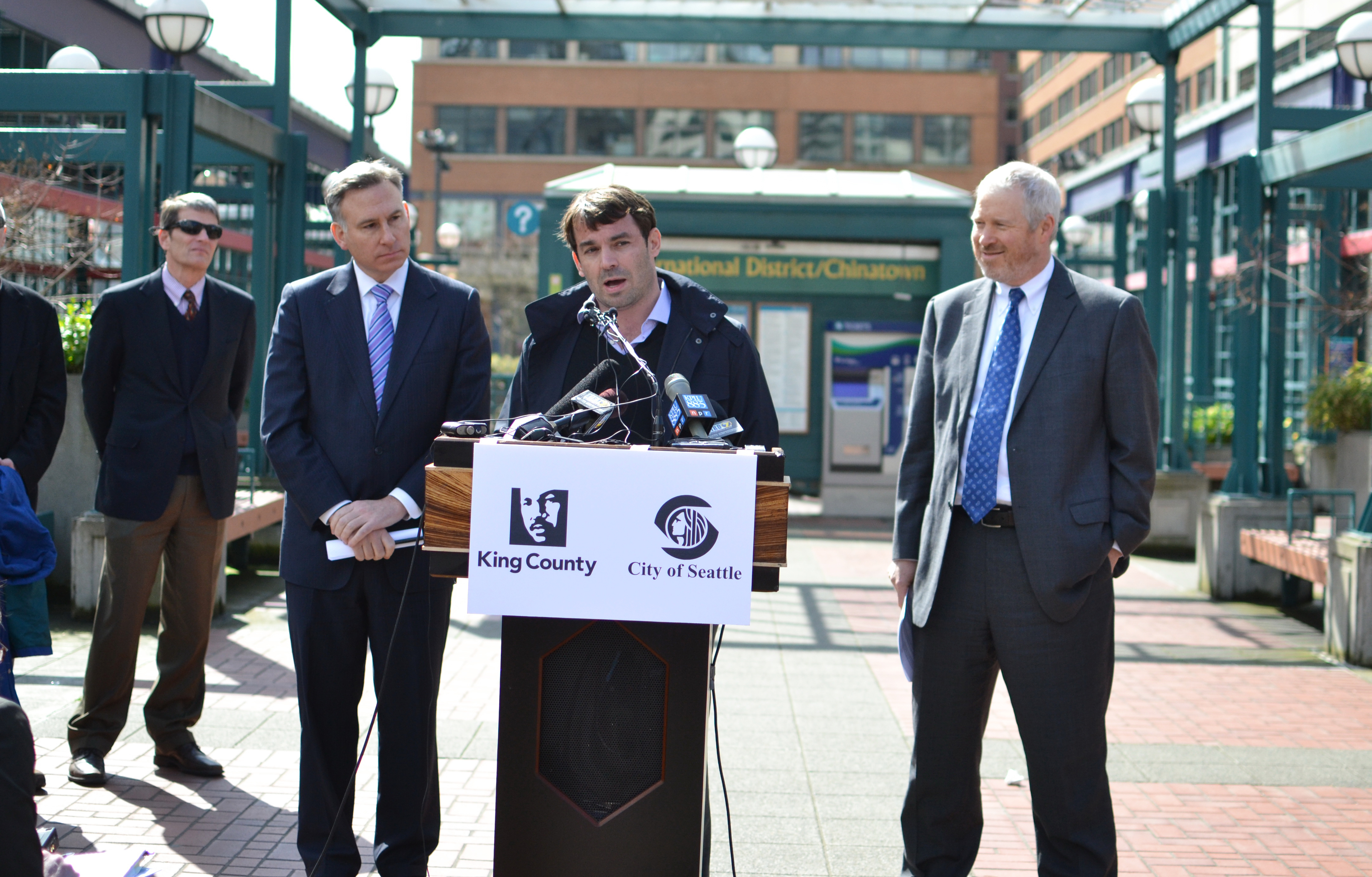
King County Executive Dow Constantine, Chris Hansen, and Seattle Mayor Mike McGinn

In late 2011, the City of Seattle was approached by San Francisco hedge fund manager Chris Hansen with a proposal to build a multipurpose arena in an industrial zone south of CenturyLink Field and Safeco Field. The total cost of a new arena had been estimated to be $490 million, and the investment group had proposed a direct public investment of up to $200 million to be repaid by ticket surcharges, split between the City of Seattle and King County. The investors had agreed to pay any construction shortfalls and for improvements to KeyArena, which would serve as a temporary home for both a new NBA team and a new NHL team while the arena was being built.

On February 16, 2012, Seattle Mayor Mike McGinn and King County Executive Dow Constantine announced an agreement with the Hansen's investment team. The Mayor and Executive forwarded a memorandum of understanding was forwarded to the Seattle City Council and the King County Council for further review and approval.

On April 5, 2012, the Port of Seattle and the Seattle Mariners Baseball club sent a letter to the Seattle City Council objecting to the location of the arena, citing traffic issues affecting freight mobility at the port, scheduling conflicts with Mariners' games, and gentrification of the "industrial waterfront".

On July 30, 2012, the King County Council approved the draft Memorandum of Understanding (MOU) that Chris Hansen, Mike McGinn, and Dow Constantine proposed. Earlier that day the Seattle City Council had declared the MOU unacceptable in its current form with the intent to renegotiate.

On September 11, 2012, the Seattle City Council reached a tentative agreement with Chris Hansen to build a SoDo basketball and ice hockey arena with revisions including the base rent being reduced from $2 million a year to $1 million, some tax revenue paying for surrounding transportation improvements and KeyArena renovations, a study for alternatives for the redevelopment of KeyArena, and an added five-year personal guarantee of bond debts from Hansen.

On September 24, 2012, the Seattle City Council approved the memorandum of understanding for the proposed SoDo basketball/ice hockey arena.

On October 15, 2012, the King County Council voted unanimously in favor, while the Seattle City Council voted 7–2 to approve the amended SoDo multipurpose arena proposal.

On August 12, 2014, major investor Steve Ballmer left the Sonics Arena investment team to purchase the Los Angeles Clippers. Ballmer purchased the Clippers for a then record $2 billion. His departure was a devastating double blow for the Sonics Arena investment team, as not only was he expected to be the majority owner of a prospective NBA franchise (A requirement for construction of the arena to commence), but the purchase price of the Clippers also greatly inflated the expected asking price of an NBA franchise (The Houston Rockets selling 3 years later for $2.2 billion). Hansen vowed to press on with the project despite Ballmer's departure, but acknowledged that he would need to find one if not multiple new investors to replace Ballmer's contribution. The Mayor's budget director Ben Noble later said of the departure of Ballmer that "the mood at City Hall for Hansen's original MOU soured considerably after Steve Ballmer purchased the Los Angeles Clippers for $2 billion in 2014."

In June, 2015, architecture giant AECOM released a study commissioned by the 2012 MOU for alternatives for the redevelopment of KeyArena. The study examined multiple potential options including a concert venue, an adventure park, a museum and even 400-500 units of housing, each option costing more than $100 million, demolition of the arena costing $7 million. The study also estimated the cost of rebuilding the arena into an NBA or NHL ready facility to be $285 million, considerably less than the $490 million price tag of the SoDo arena. Coupled with the NBA/NHL ready design, AECOM also examined the likelihood of securing a franchise in both the NBA and NHL, and concluded that NBA expansion was unlikely in the near future as the league had concerns about "product dilution" and that relocation was unlikely as "there currently is no team that is actively and publicly planning to move", but that Seattle was a top market for potential expansion or relocation of an NHL franchise due to its population, population growth, median household income, and corporate support.

The Seattle Design Commission approved the project on September 3, 2015. On November 30, 2015, the Seattle Department of Transportation and Mayor Ed Murray recommended that Occidental Avenue should be vacated for the arena. The street vacation was subject to opposition by the Port of Seattle and local longshoreman unions, citing their previous arguments from 2012 of increased traffic and gentrification of the "industrial waterfront". On May 2, 2016, the Seattle City Council voted 5–4 against the street vacation and sale of the street. Hansen said the following day in a statement that he and his group would "need to take a little time to step back and evaluate [their] options." Mayor Murray later said that the vote made it "less likely that the NBA will return to Seattle."

On October 25, 2016, in a letter to Seattle Mayor Ed Murray, King County Executive Dow Constantine and the Seattle City Council, Hansen's group offered to terminate the MOU and waive the requirement for the City and County's $200 million contribution (bonds which would have been repaid pay through rent and taxes generated by arena operations). Instead, the group would pay for the entire cost of construction and contribute to other traffic and freight mobility improvement projects, including the Lander Street Overpass, in exchange for the vacation of Occidental Avenue, a waiver on admission taxes similar to that granted to the other sports venues, and a reduction of the B&O tax rate on out-of-town revenue. The letter was issued the day before news began to surface that the city was more seriously considering a redevelopment of KeyArena instead.

On September 7, 2017, the day before a draft MOU for the redevelopment of KeyArena was to be delivered to the City Council, the Sonics Arena group released a 10-page letter detailing a $100 million privately financed redevelopment of KeyArena into a concert venue to be coupled with construction of the new basketball arena in SoDo in an effort to kick start the project again. Under the proposal, KeyArena would have been subdivided into 3 venues of varying sizes including a 6,200 seat indoor venue, a 3,000 seat outdoor venue, and a 500-seat theater. The project also included 500 underground parking stalls. The proposal was dismissed by the Office of Economic Development as the proposal was never officially submitted during the RFP process for KeyArena. "If the SODO Arena Group was interested in redeveloping KeyArena, they should have submitted their proposal during the RFP process, which would have shown a willingness to work with the City on this project. They did not submit a proposal and continue to show no interest in working in partnership with the City."

On December 4, 2017, the day after the original MOU with the Sonics Arena group expired, the Seattle City Council voted 7–1 to approve a memorandum of understanding with the Oak View Group for the redevelopment of KeyArena. The MOU included an exclusivity clause that forbade the city from giving benefits to any other group proposing an arena of 15,000 seats or more.

== Private investors ==
The primary investor for the project was Chris Hansen. Hansen had a modest upbringing in Seattle's Rainier Valley neighborhood. He is managing partner of Valiant Capital in San Francisco, where he manages approximately $2.44 billion in public and private investments as of April 2013.

Other investors included Steve Ballmer, CEO of Microsoft; former minor Sonics owner Erik Nordstrom, Executive Vice President and President (Stores) of Nordstrom; and former minor Sonics owner Peter Nordstrom, Executive Vice President and President (Merchandising) of Nordstrom.

== Public debate ==
In early April 2012, the International Longshore and Warehouse Union, Seattle Mariners and Port of Seattle were the first organizations to publicly oppose the arena proposal. All sent strongly worded letters to the city and county arguing the location would negatively impact their business. The Mariners argued that "scheduling, traffic and parking challenges that would likely require hundreds of millions of dollars to mitigate." The Port raised concerns regarding transportation, infrastructure and land use, and asked for an alternative site analysis.

Approximately 6,000 supporters of the arena proposal rallied at Occidental Park on June 14, 2012. At the two-hour rally, Chris Hansen, Dow Constantine, and other council members spoke along with former Sonics Gary Payton, Shawn Kemp, Slick Watts, and Detlef Schrempf.

On July 7, 2012, the Seattle Times wrote an editorial opposing the arena proposal, writing, "The glittering offer should be turned down with a resolute ‘no thanks." The paper argued that the location would be too detrimental to the business of Port of Seattle and other companies in the industrial area.

== Design ==
On March 13, 2013, Chris Hansen's group released preliminary design renderings of the arena's interior. Configured to support both basketball and ice hockey, the renderings illustrated two unique seating options. Small sideline "pocket" suites would be less than ten rows from the floor. In the upper tier of the arena, three "Sonic Ring" sections would have allowed expanded standing-room seating. It could be opened or closed based on event capacity needs. Each ring would have featured approximately 800–900 fixed seats and standing-room capacity for between 700 and 1,500 people.

== Other Seattle-area proposals ==
In 2015, two proposals from other groups interested in both basketball and hockey proposed new arenas in the suburbs of Tukwila and Bellevue in light of delays in the approval of the SoDo arena.

== See also ==
- Seattle Kraken
