= Geoffrey Bowers =

American lawyer

- Born: Geoffrey Francis Bowers; December 29, 1953; Cambridge, Massachusetts, U.S.
- Died: September 30, 1987 (aged 33); Boston, Massachusetts, U.S.
- Cause of death: AIDS
- Occupations: Attorney, activist

Geoffrey Francis Bowers (December 29, 1953 – September 30, 1987) was an American attorney who was the plaintiff in one of the first HIV/AIDS discrimination cases to go to public hearing.

== Early life ==
Bowers was born on December 29, 1953, in Cambridge, Massachusetts. He received his bachelor's degree from Brown University where he studied political science. He worked in a factory and as a television news reporter before enrolling at the Benjamin N. Cardozo School of Law in New York City in the fall of 1979.

== Career and diagnosis ==
During his time at law school, Bowers earned a position on the Cardozo law review and worked part-time, first as a proofreader at a law firm and later as a researcher and writer for Phillips, Nizer, Benjamin, Krim and Ballon, a New York law firm. After his graduation he joined Phillips, Nizer, et al. as an associate.

In August 1984, Bowers joined Baker McKenzie as a litigation associate. Baker McKenzie is an international law firm, and Bowers hoped to use his knowledge of Italian, German, French, Dutch and Spanish. The following year, Bowers began to experience throbbing headaches and see yellow spots. He was diagnosed with meningitis. In April 1986, he was diagnosed with Kaposi's sarcoma and AIDS.

In May 1986 the law firm's partners gave Bowers a satisfactory evaluation. Two months later, in July, they voted to dismiss him, without following normal termination procedures, including consulting with his supervisor or asking for a list of his clients and billable hours. His supervisors objected to the decision, delaying its implementation. However, in October, 12 of the 15 partners again voted to dismiss him. He left the firm on December 5, 1986.

== Baker & McKenzie lawsuit and hearings ==
Bowers subsequently filed a complaint with the New York State Division of Human Rights alleging discrimination. On July 14, 1987, the New York State Division of Human Rights held the first hearings in the case in a trial format, with Judge Amos Carnegie overseeing the proceedings. A representative for the firm claimed that Bowers was dismissed because of performance issues, while his complaint charged that he had been fired from his job because of the skin lesions that had begun appearing on his body and face. Bowers died on September 30, 1987, in Boston at the age of 33, just two months after the hearings began. His long-term partner Alex Londres (a short story writer) died one year later, also of AIDS-related illness.

The hearings took place on 39 days over the course of two years. It took more than six years for the case to finally be resolved, when in December 1993 the agency awarded its largest sum for any complaint to that date: $500,000 in compensatory damages and the back pay he would have earned had he remained employed. Baker McKenzie appealed but subsequently withdrew the appeal in 1995 after they negotiated a confidential settlement with Bowers's family, forbidding parties from ever discussing the case or the terms of the agreement.

== Philadelphia film and legal action ==
Bowers's family sued the writers and producers of the film Philadelphia, claiming that it was based on Bowers's life. One year after Bowers's death, producer Scott Rudin had interviewed the Bowers family and their lawyers and, according to the Bowers family, promised them compensation. Family members claim that 54 scenes in the film were very similar to events in Bowers's life, and that some of the information in the film could only have come from their interviews. The defense said that after Rudin sold the film idea to Tri-Star Pictures, the studio which then went on to produce the film, he had no further involvement in its development, that he had never shared with the studio any of the information that had been provided to him by the Bowers family, and all screenplay material originating from the Bowers case had been taken only from publicly available sources. The lawsuit was settled in 1996. Although terms of the agreement were not released, the defendants did acknowledge that the film was "inspired in part" by Bowers's story.
