= Microsoft Corp. v. Internal Revenue Service =

Lawsuit over Freedom of Information Act

- Court: United States District Court for the District of Columbia
- Full case name: Microsoft Corporation v. Internal Revenue Service
- Docket nos.: 1:14-cv-01982

Court membership
- Judge sitting: Reggie B. Walton

The lawsuit Microsoft v. Internal Revenue Service, No. 1:14-cv-01982, was filed in U.S. District Court, District of Columbia when Microsoft sued the Internal Revenue Service requesting the IRS comply with a Freedom of Information Act request. According to Microsoft the IRS "unlawfully withheld" information on a contract between law firm Quinn Emanuel Urquhart & Sullivan and the IRS. The IRS uses the services of the law firm to assess transfer pricing financial audits of Microsoft.

== Background ==
The IRS had been investigating Microsoft Corporation since 2007. Auditors have been looking at records for tax years 2004 to 2006, trying to determine if Microsoft transferred some software rights to its international subsidiaries in an effort to evade paying tax to the United States.

Microsoft had filed the Freedom of Information request on September 22, 2014. When the IRS did not reply within the 20-days required by law, Microsoft sent the IRS a letter. The IRS responded by saying it needed an extension, but after the time elapsed did not provide the information.

The contract between the IRS and Quinn Emmanuel was signed May 19, 2014, with a completion date of December 31, 2016, and a payment obligation of $2,185,500, according to a website maintained by the Office of Management and Budget. The law firm was retained by the IRS to help it examine the Corporate federal tax returns filed by Microsoft between 2004 and 2009. The service to be supplied by Quinn Emanuel was categorized as "Support-Professional: Expert Witness". Quinn Emanuel will work closely with the IRS examination team during the audit phase and is tasked with reviewing all "the key documents ...and all relevant legal authorities to build a thorough understanding of the factual and legal issues and the record to date." The transfer pricing issues that the audit may involve include a cost sharing agreement (CSA) with respect to the sufficiency of buy-in payments by an offshore affiliate of Microsoft's in exchange for licensing intangibles.

== History ==
On September 10, 2014 ZDNet reported that Microsoft was held in contempt of court after refusing to hand over foreign data.

On December 24, 2014, the Seattle Times reported that the IRS sued former Microsoft CEO Steve Ballmer, Craig Mundie, Jeff Raikes, Jim Allchin, Orlando Ayala and David Guenther in an effort to compel them to testify in Microsoft's corporate tax audit. The IRS has been looking into how Microsoft and other companies deal with transfer pricing.

== See also ==
- Microsoft Corporation v. United States of America
