= Sacramento Kings failed relocation attempts =

Attempted NBA franchise relocation

From 2006 to 2013, the Sacramento Kings organization was under constant threat of the team moving. It is widely believed that the team's owners throughout this period (the Maloof family) lost much of their fortune and were no longer able to run a National Basketball Association (NBA) franchise. The Maloofs courted Anaheim, Virginia Beach, and Seattle as potential suitors for the team. Sacramento Mayor and former NBA All-Star Kevin Johnson, with the help of local business owners and a rabid fan base, was successful in saving the franchise and persuading the NBA to force the Maloofs to sell the team to the Vivek Ranadivé group.

== Anaheim ==
On February 19, 2011, NBA commissioner David Stern admitted that the Kings and officials in Anaheim, California had discussions about relocation. It was later found that the organization went as far as to file for a trademark of the name Anaheim Royals, among others. The Maloofs prepared to make their case for relocation at the NBA Board of Governors meeting in New York, in what many expected to simply be a formality.

In a surprise announcement, Mayor Johnson announced during a presentation to the NBA that Ron Burkle, a billionaire associate of former U.S. President Bill Clinton and Democratic Party fundraiser, wanted to buy the Kings and keep them in Sacramento. Johnson also pledged some $10 million from local businesses as a show of support from Sacramento. This, in addition to support from Sacramento citizens, may have swayed Stern and the relocation committee to tell the Maloofs to withdraw their relocation plans.

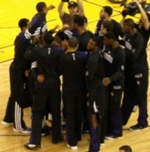
The Kings huddling prior to the tip of the 2011–12 exhibition opener against the Golden State Warriors.

== Sacramento rail yards ==
On February 27, 2012, the Kings' owners, the city, and the NBA came to a tentative deal on the construction of a $387 million facility in the rail yards in downtown Sacramento. The city would pay more than $250 million up front, raised by leasing city-owned parking lots to a private company. The Maloofs would contribute $75 million up front as well as the money from the sale of the current Sleep Train Arena. In addition they would pay a 5% surcharge on ticket sales to generate another $75 million through the span of the deal. Arena operator AEG was to contribute another $60 million up front for the right to operate the arena. With this agreement, it was expected that the Kings would play in the new arena as early as 2015.

Amid great fanfare, the outline of the deal was approved by the city council on March 7, 2012. On April 13, 2012, the Maloof family announced that they had backed out of their deal with Sacramento.

== Virginia Beach ==
Although there had not been as much progress in these negotiations as there has been with Anaheim, another market trying to lure the Kings to move there was the Hampton Roads metropolitan area of Virginia. Virginia Beach said it was willing to build an 18,000-seat arena with Comcast Spectacor managing it in the hopes of luring a team to the area. Both parties could not formalize an agreement and the deal was soon dead.

== Seattle ==
On January 9, 2013, the National Basketball Association's official website reported that the Maloofs, majority owners of the Sacramento Kings, were in discussions with a Seattle-based ownership group led by Chris Hansen, Microsoft CEO Steve Ballmer, and Eric Nordstrom and Peter Nordstrom from Nordstrom, to sell and relocate the team. Chris Hansen had recently purchased $6.8 million of parking spaces for Seattle's new arena. On January 20, USA Today reported that a deal had been reached where the Maloof family would sell their majority ownership in the Kings to the Seattle ownership group, although Stern affirmed he would allow Mayor Johnson to address either the Board of Governors, or the Relocation Committee, prior to the approval of the sale or relocation if he desired to do so. The next day, Yahoo! Sports reported that the sale to the Seattle group had been finalized, and that the league would shortly approve the sale and relocation to Seattle, with an official announcement to come later in that week. According to this report, efforts by potential Sacramento ownership groups were too late.

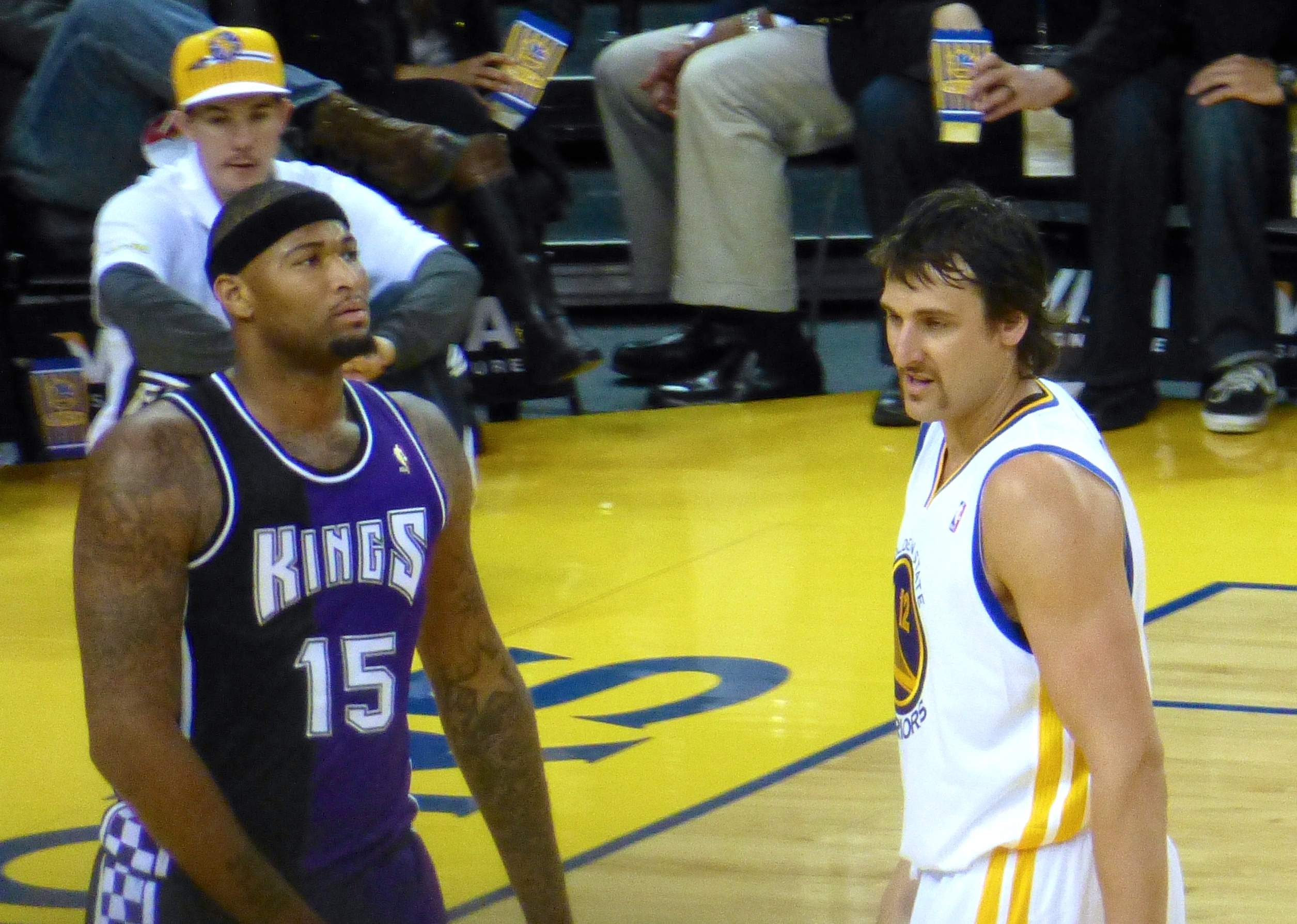
DeMarcus Cousins looks on to Golden State's Andrew Bogut, 2013

On January 21, 2013, it was confirmed that a deal to sell the team to the Seattle-based ownership group was reached, with the contingency that the NBA Board of Governors approve the deal. The Maloof family said in a statement that they had agreed to sell the team to a Seattle group led by investor Chris Hansen, but the deal was pending approval by the NBA Board of Governors. The sale would have been for 65% of the franchise and based upon a $525 million valuation, with the new owners expected to relocate the franchise to Seattle and utilize the SuperSonics name. The Maloofs would have had no ongoing stake in the team.

On February 6, 2013, David Stern stated the Seattle ownership group had filed with the NBA for franchise relocation from Sacramento to Seattle. Kevin Johnson announced a counteroffer and framework towards an arena deal in a city address. The arena would be funded by Ron Burkle, while 24 Hour Fitness founder Mark Mastrov would provide backing for franchise bid. On March 1, 2013, it was announced that Kings minority owner John Kehriotis, who owns 12% of the team, would attempt to exercise his right of first refusal and submit a bid to purchase the Maloof's share of the team.

David Stern revealed that the bid made by Sacramento would not even be considered unless it was as large as the Seattle group. Additionally, Sacramento's investors needed to provide a different bid by April 3, so the NBA Board of Governors could make a final decision.

On March 21, it was announced that Vivek Ranadivé had joined Ron Burkle and Mark Mastrov to be the 3rd major investor in the attempt to purchase the Kings. In order for Ranadivé to purchase the Kings, he would be required to sell his minority share of the Golden State Warriors. Paul E. Jacobs, CEO of Qualcomm, joined the team of Sacramento investors. Later, Burkle would cease all financial involvement as an investor towards the potential Sacramento ownership group or a proposed Sacramento arena due to a conflict of interest that concerned the NBA.

Chris Hansen submitted a bid for an additional 7% minority stake in the Sacramento Kings franchise on March 27. Pending approval by the NBA and a California bankruptcy court, Hansen was set to own 72% of the Sacramento Kings franchise before he would have relocated the Kings to Seattle for the 2013–14 NBA season.

The Maloof family gave Sacramento's potential ownership group an ultimatum to match the Seattle ownership group's $341 million offer, by 5 PM on April 12, 2013, as a backup option in the event that the Seattle ownership group's purchase agreement was denied by the NBA Board of Governors. Otherwise, Sacramento's potential ownership group would not receive any consideration to purchase the team, even if the NBA Board of Governors were to reject the Seattle bid. Chris Hansen announced that his Seattle-based ownership group had increased their purchase price for the Sacramento Kings from $525 million to $550 million. Hansen's 65% share was estimated at $357.5 million and was expected to further increase the values of all NBA franchises.

On April 29, 2013, the NBA Board of Governors Relocation Committee that studied the situation unanimously voted 7–0 against relocating the Kings to Seattle, with the official vote of the 30 NBA owners scheduled for May 13. On May 10, Chris Hansen announced that his ownership group increased the price on their purchase of the Maloofs' share of the Sacramento Kings, from a $550 million to a $625 million franchise valuation. On May 11, reports indicated the Maloofs would decline to sell to any Sacramento owners, instead opting to sell 20% of the franchise to Hansen's group for $125 million as a contingency.

After the meeting in Dallas, Texas, the NBA owners voted 22–8 to reject the Kings' relocation to Seattle. The vote effectively ended the Hansen group's efforts to buy the Kings and relocate them.

== See also ==
- Relocation of professional sports teams
- List of relocated NBA teams
- Minnesota Timberwolves failed relocation to New Orleans
