= Pete Higgins (businessman) =

American businessman

Pete Higgins is an American technologist and venture capitalist. An early employee of Microsoft, Higgins is now a partner and co-founder of the Seattle-based venture capital firm Second Avenue Partners. He serves on the board of directors for the Brookings Institution and was a former trustee of Stanford University, his alma mater.

== Activity ==
Prior to founding Second Avenue Partners, Higgins spent 16 years at Microsoft Corporation. Higgins was a member of the Office of the President, reporting directly to CEO Bill Gates. He was group vice president of the Interactive Media Group at Microsoft from 1996 to 1998. From 1995 to 1996, he was group vice president of Applications and Content, responsible for Microsoft Office consumer and online applications, desktop finance, hardware and Microsoft Research. From 1992 to 1995, he was senior vice president of the Desktop Applications division, where he was responsible for developing, marketing and localizing Microsoft Office.

Higgins also serves on advisory boards for the Stanford Woods Institute for the Environment and the Precourt Institute for Energy at Stanford University.
