= Chris R. Hansen =

American hedge fund manager

- Education: San Diego State University (1991), USC Marshall School of Business (1996)
- Occupation: Hedge Fund Manager
- Employer: Valiant Capital Management

Christopher R. Hansen is an American hedge fund manager. In March 2008, he founded Valiant Capital Management, a San Francisco, California-based global long/short equity hedge fund that had $2.7 billion in assets in 2012.

Valiant Capital Management was included in a 2021 Department of Justice list of 20/30 short sellers being investigated.

== Early life ==
Hansen grew up in Seattle, Washington, after his family moved there when he was six years old.

== Career ==
Hansen served as an analyst and a partner at Montgomery Securities and Blue Ridge Capital in San Francisco. He was Managing Director at Blue Ridge for 7 years, from 2001 to 2008.

After leaving Blue Ridge, Hansen founded Valiant Capital, where he is currently president and portfolio manager. He is supported by seven junior partners.

== Basketball interest ==
In January 2013, a group led by Hansen reached an agreement to buy the Sacramento Kings and relocate the team to Seattle. But on April 29, 2013, the NBA's relocation committee unanimously recommended that NBA owners reject the application to move the team, which had been submitted by the Maloof family, the owners at the time, on Hansen's behalf. The sale to Hansen was rejected by the NBA's Board of Governors in a 22-8 vote.

In August 2013, Hansen was revealed as the principal financial backer of a petition effort for a public vote on a new arena in Sacramento; a new arena was a requirement of the NBA by 2017 for long-term tenancy of the Kings in Sacramento.
