= Orlando Magic all-time roster =

The following is a list of players, both past and current, who appeared at least in one game for the Orlando Magic NBA franchise.

== Players ==
Note: Statistics are correct through the end of the 2025–26 season.

G	Guard	G/F	Guard-forward	F	Forward	F/C	Forward-center	C	Center

legend
^	Denotes player who has been inducted to the Naismith Memorial Basketball Hall of Fame
*	Denotes player who has been selected for at least one All-Star Game with the Orlando Magic and is currently on the team roster
^{+}	Denotes player who has been selected for at least one All-Star Game with the Orlando Magic
^{x}	Denotes player who is currently on the Orlando Magic roster
0.0	Denotes the Orlando Magic statistics leader (min. 100 games played for the team for per-game statistics)

=== A ===
All-time roster
Player	Pos.	Pre-draft team	Yrs	Seasons	Statistics									Ref.
Player	Pos.	Pre-draft team	Yrs	Seasons	GP	MP	REB	AST	PTS	MPG	RPG	APG	PPG	Ref.
Tariq Abdul-Wahad	F	San Jose State	1	1999–2000	46	1,205	239	72	563	26.2	5.2	1.6	12.2	
Mark Acres	F/C	Oral Roberts	3	1989–1992	216	3,930	1,042	114	855	18.2	4.8	0.5	4.0	
Arron Afflalo	G/F	UCLA	3	2012–2014; 2017–2018	190	5,541	567	484	2,566	29.2	3.0	2.5	13.5	
Cory Alexander	G	Virginia	1	2000–2001	26	227	25	36	52	8.7	1.0	1.4	2.0	
Malik Allen	F/C	Villanova	1	2010–2011	18	178	32	4	23	9.9	1.8	0.2	1.3	
Rafer Alston	G	Fresno State	1	2008–2009	29	856	83	148	348	29.5	2.9	5.1	12.0	
John Amaechi	F/C	Penn State	2	1999–2001	162	3,394	534	169	1,486	21.0	3.3	1.0	9.2	
Al-Farouq Aminu	F	Wake Forest	2	2019–2021	35	747	178	50	171	21.3	5.1	1.4	4.9	
Nick Anderson	G/F	Illinois	10	1989–1999	692	22,440	3,667	1,937	10,650	32.4	5.3	2.8	15.4	
Ryan Anderson	F	California	3	2009–2012	188	4,299	1,028	143	2,148	22.9	5.5	0.8	11.4	
Michael Ansley	F	Alabama	2	1989–1991	139	2,098	615	65	1,005	15.1	4.4	0.5	7.2	
Cole Anthony	G	North Carolina	5	2020–2025	320	7,935	1,372	1,223	4,015	24.8	4.3	3.8	12.5	
Keith Appling	G	Michigan State	1	2015–2016	5	27	1	1	6	5.4	0.2	0.2	1.2	
Robert Archibald	F	Illinois	1	2003–2004	1	4	1	0	2	4.0	1.0	0.0	2.0	
Gilbert Arenas	G	Arizona	1	2010–2011	49	1,070	119	157	392	21.8	2.4	3.2	8.0	
Trevor Ariza	F	UCLA	3	2005–2008	89	1,683	354	88	641	18.9	4.0	1.0	7.2	
B. J. Armstrong	G	Iowa	1	1998–1999	22	180	23	34	48	8.2	1.0	1.5	2.2	
Darrell Armstrong	G	Fayetteville State	9	1994–2003	502	14,234	1,645	2,555	5,898	28.4	3.3	5.1	11.7	
Carlos Arroyo	G	FIU	3	2005–2008	161	3,167	307	498	1,273	19.7	1.9	3.1	7.9	
Jamel Artis	G/F	Pittsburgh	1	2017–2018	15	279	38	18	77	18.6	2.5	1.2	5.1	
Chucky Atkins	G	South Florida	1	1999–2000	82	1,626	126	306	782	19.8	1.5	3.7	9.5	
Stacey Augmon	G/F	UNLV	2	2004–2006	91	1,048	152	59	264	11.5	1.7	0.6	2.9	
D. J. Augustin	G	Texas	4	2016–2020	291	6,987	602	1,184	2,929	24.0	2.1	4.1	10.1	
James Augustine	F	Illinois	2	2006–2008	27	156	33	4	42	5.8	1.2	0.1	1.6	
Isaac Austin	C	Arizona State	1	1998–1999	49	1,259	237	89	477	25.7	4.8	1.8	9.7	
Anthony Avent	F	Seton Hall	2	1993–1995	112	1,742	477	73	402	15.6	4.3	0.7	3.6	
Gustavo Ayón	C	(Mexico) Halcones de Xalapa	1	2012–2013	43	571	140	59	153	13.3	3.3	1.4	3.6	

=== B ===
All-time roster
Player	Pos.	Pre-draft team	Yrs	Seasons	Statistics									Ref.
Player	Pos.	Pre-draft team	Yrs	Seasons	GP	MP	REB	AST	PTS	MPG	RPG	APG	PPG	Ref.
Dwayne Bacon	G	Florida State	1	2020–2021	72	1,853	224	93	788	25.7	3.1	1.3	10.9	
Mo Bamba	C	Texas	5	2018–2023	266	4,874	1,556	243	2,037	18.3	5.8	0.9	7.7	
Paolo Banchero*	F	Duke	4	2022–2026	270	9,313	2,000	1,292	6,031	34.5	7.4	4.8	22.3	
Desmond Bane^{x}	G	TCU	1	2025–2026	82	2,756	338	338	1,647	33.6	4.1	4.1	20.1	
Matt Barnes	F	UCLA	1	2009–2010	81	2,097	445	134	716	25.9	5.5	1.7	8.8	
Andre Barrett	G	Seton Hall	1	2004–2005	11	169	21	27	62	15.4	1.9	2.5	5.6	
Brandon Bass	F	LSU	2	2009–2011	126	2,628	551	76	1,144	20.9	4.4	0.6	9.1	
Tony Battie	F/C	Texas Tech	4	2004–2007; 2008–2009	306	6,886	1,531	157	1,819	22.5	5.0	0.5	5.9	
David Benoit	F	Alabama	1	1997–1998	24	324	62	8	138	13.5	2.6	0.3	5.8	
Khem Birch	C	UNLV	4	2017–2021	188	3,095	833	175	885	16.5	4.4	0.9	4.7	
Goga Bitadze^{x}	C	(Serbia) KK Mega Basket	4	2022–2026	213	3,614	1,157	321	1,286	17.0	5.4	1.5	6.0	
Bismack Biyombo	C	(Spain) Fuenlabrada	2	2016–2018	163	3,288	1,035	140	951	20.2	6.3	0.9	5.8	
Anthony Black^{x}	G	Arkansas	3	2023–2026	211	4,961	613	567	2,011	23.5	2.9	2.7	9.5	
Keith Bogans	G/F	Kentucky	4	2003–2004; 2006–2009	250	5,762	787	292	1,696	23.0	3.1	1.2	6.8	
Bol Bol	F	Oregon	1	2022–2023	70	1,505	405	69	634	21.5	5.8	1.0	9.1	
Jordan Bone	G	Tennessee	1	2020–2021	14	196	24	18	56	14.0	1.6	1.3	4.0	
Anthony Bonner	F	Saint Louis	1	1995–1996	4	43	19	4	13	10.8	4.8	1.0	3.3	
Anthony Bowie	G/F	Oklahoma	5	1991–1996	350	6,769	821	704	2,431	19.3	2.3	2.0	6.9	
Earl Boykins	G	Eastern Michigan	1	1999–2000	1	8	1	3	6	8.0	1.0	3.0	6.0	
Michael Bradley	F/C	Villanova	1	2004–2005	8	55	14	2	6	6.9	1.8	0.3	0.8	
Ignas Brazdeikis	F	Michigan	2	2020–2022	50	770	113	53	299	15.4	2.3	1.1	6.0	
Isaiah Briscoe	G	Kentucky	1	2018–2019	39	559	74	87	136	14.3	1.9	2.2	3.5	
Anthony Brown	G/F	Stanford	1	2016–2017	2	16	7	2	9	8.0	3.5	1.0	4.5	
Dee Brown	G	Jacksonville	2	2000–2002	14	220	20	14	55	15.7	1.4	1.0	3.9	
Jud Buechler	G/F	Arizona	1	2001–2002	60	630	108	29	105	10.5	1.8	0.5	1.8	
Pat Burke	F/C	Auburn	1	2002–2003	62	783	146	23	267	12.6	2.4	0.4	4.3	

=== C to D ===
All-time roster
Player	Pos.	Pre-draft team	Yrs	Seasons	Statistics									Ref.
Player	Pos.	Pre-draft team	Yrs	Seasons	GP	MP	REB	AST	PTS	MPG	RPG	APG	PPG	Ref.
Jamal Cain^{x}	F	Oakland	1	2025–2026	40	486	78	29	215	12.2	2.0	0.7	5.4	
Kentavious Caldwell-Pope	G	Georgia	1	2024–2025	77	2,279	169	136	673	29.6	2.2	1.8	8.7	
Devin Cannady	G	Princeton	2	2020–2022	13	219	11	11	84	16.8	0.8	0.8	6.5	
Jevon Carter^{x}	G	West Virginia	1	2025–2026	30	613	63	68	215	20.4	2.1	2.3	7.2	
Vince Carter^	G/F	North Carolina	2	2009–2011	97	2,974	383	300	1,577	30.7	3.9	3.1	16.3	
Wendell Carter Jr.^{x}	F/C	Duke	6	2020–2026	342	9,577	2,788	721	4,200	28.0	8.2	2.1	12.3	
Michael Carter-Williams	G	Syracuse	4	2018–2021; 2022–2023	92	1,904	348	294	679	20.7	3.8	3.2	7.4	
Colin Castleton^{x}	C	Florida	1	2025–2026	4	21	8	1	5	5.3	2.0	0.3	1.3	
Terry Catledge	F	South Alabama	4	1989–1993	224	6,613	1,513	244	3,433	29.5	6.8	1.1	15.3	
Kelvin Cato	C	Iowa State	2	2004–2006	85	1,824	479	42	520	21.5	5.6	0.5	6.1	
Troy Caupain	G	Cincinnati	1	2018–2019	4	16	3	4	10	4.0	0.8	1.0	2.5	
Doug Christie	G/F	Pepperdine	1	2004–2005	21	529	54	46	119	25.2	2.6	2.2	5.7	
Earl Clark	F	Louisville	2	2010–2012	78	951	208	23	257	12.2	2.7	0.3	3.3	
Gary Clark	F	Cincinnati	2	2019–2021	59	992	182	35	205	16.8	3.1	0.6	3.5	
Anthony Cook	F/C	Arizona	1	1993–1994	2	2	0	0	0	1.0	0.0	0.0	0.0	
Brian Cook	F	Illinois	2	2007–2009	66	705	126	28	286	10.7	1.9	0.4	4.3	
Chris Corchiani	G	NC State	2	1991–1993	60	843	85	157	297	14.1	1.4	2.6	5.0	
Dave Corzine	C	DePaul	1	1989–1990	6	79	18	2	22	13.2	3.0	0.3	3.7	
Tristan da Silva^{x}	F	Colorado	2	2024–2026	151	3,528	529	237	1,295	23.4	3.5	1.6	8.6	
Glen Davis	F/C	LSU	3	2011–2014	140	3,845	859	187	1,623	27.5	6.1	1.3	11.6	
Andrew DeClercq	F/C	Florida	5	2000–2005	284	4,123	1,065	150	1,027	14.5	3.8	0.5	3.6	
Dewayne Dedmon	C	USC	3	2013–2016	133	1,784	601	24	530	13.4	4.5	0.2	4.0	
Dell Demps	G	Pacific	1	1996–1997	2	10	0	0	2	5.0	0.0	0.0	1.0	
Derrick Dial	G	Eastern Michigan	1	2003–2004	9	86	13	2	26	9.6	1.4	0.2	2.9	
Travis Diener	G	Marquette	2	2005–2007	49	534	39	51	186	10.9	0.8	1.0	3.8	
Michael Doleac	C	Utah	3	1998–2001	207	3,513	755	148	1,359	17.0	3.6	0.7	6.6	
Keyon Dooling	G	Missouri	3	2005–2008	188	3,906	265	354	1,572	20.8	1.4	1.9	8.4	
Jeff Dowtin Jr.	G	Rhode Island	1	2021–2022	4	77	11	7	13	19.3	2.8	1.8	3.3	
Chris Duhon	G	Duke	2	2010–2012	114	2,000	154	269	362	17.5	1.4	2.4	3.2	

=== E to G ===
All-time roster
Player	Pos.	Pre-draft team	Yrs	Seasons	Statistics									Ref.
Player	Pos.	Pre-draft team	Yrs	Seasons	GP	MP	REB	AST	PTS	MPG	RPG	APG	PPG	Ref.
Kevin Edwards	G	DePaul	1	1997–1998	12	135	20	13	59	11.3	1.7	1.1	4.9	
James Ennis	F	Long Beach State	2	2019–2021	61	1,475	261	84	514	24.2	4.3	1.4	8.4	
Brian Evans	F	Indiana	2	1996–1998	58	620	93	38	226	10.7	1.6	0.7	3.9	
Maurice Evans	G	Texas	1	2007–2008	68	1,624	209	69	633	23.9	3.1	1.0	9.3	
Patrick Ewing^	F/C	Georgetown	1	2001–2002	65	901	263	35	390	13.9	4.0	0.5	6.0	
Aleem Ford	F	Wisconsin	1	2021–2022	5	74	15	2	14	14.8	3.0	0.4	2.8	
Evan Fournier	G/F	(France) Poitiers	7	2014–2021	435	13,714	1,271	1,299	7,049	31.5	2.9	3.0	16.2	
Adonal Foyle	C	Colgate	2	2007–2009	91	833	234	19	173	9.2	2.6	0.2	1.9	
Steve Francis	G	Maryland	2	2004–2006	124	4,712	669	809	2,410	38.0	5.4	6.5	19.4	
Robert Franks	F	Washington State	1	2020–2021	7	101	14	5	43	14.4	2.0	0.7	6.1	
Melvin Frazier	G	Tulane	2	2018–2020	29	170	15	4	55	5.9	0.5	0.1	1.9	
Tim Frazier	G	Penn State	1	2021–2022	10	200	19	33	37	20.0	1.9	3.3	3.7	
Channing Frye	F/C	Arizona	2	2014–2016	119	2,624	434	139	778	22.1	3.6	1.2	6.5	
Markelle Fultz	G	Washington	5	2019–2024	201	5,259	684	972	2,340	26.2	3.4	4.8	11.6	
Reece Gaines	G	Louisville	1	2003–2004	38	364	39	40	69	9.6	1.0	1.1	1.8	
Patricio Garino	G/F	George Washington	1	2016–2017	5	43	7	0	0	8.6	1.4	0.0	0.0	
Kiwane Garris	G	Illinois	1	1999–2000	3	23	1	2	4	7.7	0.3	0.7	1.3	
Pat Garrity	F	Notre Dame	9	1999–2008	513	10,524	1,382	425	3,800	20.5	2.7	0.8	7.4	
Chris Gatling	F/C	Old Dominion	1	1999–2000	45	1,041	297	40	598	23.1	6.6	0.9	13.3	
Marcus Georges-Hunt	G	Georgia Tech	1	2016–2017	5	48	9	3	14	9.6	1.8	0.6	2.8	
Freddie Gillespie	F	Baylor	1	2021–2022	9	119	36	5	21	13.2	4.0	0.6	2.3	
Gordan Giriček	G/F	(Croatia) Cibona	2	2002–2004	75	2,396	294	147	876	31.9	3.9	2.0	11.7	
Drew Gooden	F	Kansas	2	2002–2004	98	2,678	676	109	1,173	27.3	6.9	1.1	12.0	
Aaron Gordon	F	Arizona	7	2014–2021	428	12,253	2,753	1,069	5,507	28.6	6.4	2.5	12.9	
Ben Gordon	G	UConn	1	2014–2015	56	790	63	50	349	14.1	1.1	0.9	6.2	
Marcin Gortat	F/C	(Germany) RheinStars Köln	4	2007–2011	175	2,319	761	50	650	13.3	4.3	0.3	3.7	
Horace Grant	F/C	Clemson	7	1994–1999; 2001–2003	411	14,233	3,353	879	4,638	34.6	8.2	2.1	11.3	
Jerian Grant	G	Notre Dame	1	2018–2019	60	939	98	156	250	15.7	1.6	2.6	4.2	
Hassani Gravett	G	South Carolina	1	2021–2022	8	171	21	20	50	21.4	2.6	2.5	6.3	
Jeff Green	F	Georgetown	1	2016–2017	69	1,534	214	81	638	22.2	3.1	1.2	9.2	
Litterial Green	G	Georgia	2	1992–1994	81	752	46	125	308	9.3	0.6	1.5	3.8	
Sidney Green	F/C	UNLV	1	1989–1990	73	1,860	588	99	761	25.5	8.1	1.4	10.4	
Willie Green	G	Detroit Mercy	1	2014–2015	52	951	79	68	306	18.3	1.5	1.3	5.9	

=== H ===
All-time roster
Player	Pos.	Pre-draft team	Yrs	Seasons	Statistics									Ref.
Player	Pos.	Pre-draft team	Yrs	Seasons	GP	MP	REB	AST	PTS	MPG	RPG	APG	PPG	Ref.
Donta Hall	F/C	Alabama	1	2020–2021	13	179	62	11	73	13.8	4.8	0.8	5.6	
Geert Hammink	C	LSU	3	1993–1996	5	17	6	2	10	3.4	1.2	0.4	2.0	
R. J. Hampton	G	New Zealand Breakers	3	2020–2023	116	2,418	362	265	928	20.8	3.1	2.3	8.0	
Penny Hardaway^{+}	G	Memphis	6	1993–1999	369	13,721	1,752	2,343	7,018	37.2	4.7	6.3	19.0	
Maurice Harkless	G/F	St. John's	3	2012–2015	201	4,598	705	155	1,375	22.9	3.5	0.8	6.8	
Derek Harper	G	Illinois	1	1997–1998	66	1,761	103	233	566	26.7	1.6	3.5	8.6	
Justin Harper	F	Richmond	1	2011–2012	14	84	12	2	20	6.0	0.9	0.1	1.4	
Matt Harpring	F	Georgia Tech	2	1998–2000	54	1,177	226	53	424	21.8	4.2	1.0	7.9	
Al Harrington	F	St. Patrick HS (NJ)	1	2012–2013	10	119	27	10	51	11.9	2.7	1.0	5.1	
Gary Harris	G	Michigan State	5	2020–2025	231	5,421	407	330	1,797	23.5	1.8	1.4	7.8	
Kevon Harris	G	Stephen F. Austin	2	2022–2024	36	463	72	17	145	12.9	2.0	0.5	4.0	
Tobias Harris	F	Tennessee	4	2012–2016	205	6,803	1,426	361	3,193	33.2	7.0	1.8	15.6	
Donnell Harvey	F	Florida	1	2003–2004	24	345	72	8	98	14.4	3.0	0.3	4.1	
Mario Hezonja	G/F	(Spain) FC Barcelona	3	2015–2018	219	4,030	603	277	1,517	18.4	2.8	1.3	6.9	
Sean Higgins	G/F	Michigan	1	1991–1992	32	580	94	37	276	18.1	2.9	1.2	8.6	
Grant Hill^	G/F	Duke	6	2000–2003; 2004–2007	200	6,448	991	617	3,280	32.2	5.0	3.1	16.4	
Caleb Houstan	F	Michigan	3	2022–2025	168	2,415	258	94	685	14.4	1.5	0.6	4.1	
Dwight Howard^	C	SACA (GA)	8	2004–2012	621	22,471	8,072	935	11,435	36.2	13.0	1.5	18.4	
Jett Howard^{x}	F	Michigan	3	2023–2026	133	1,463	164	95	597	11.0	1.2	0.7	4.5	
Juwan Howard	F	Michigan	1	2003–2004	81	2,877	570	158	1,376	35.5	7.0	2.0	17.0	
Troy Hudson	G	Southern Illinois	2	2000–2002	156	2,862	250	417	1,307	18.3	1.6	2.7	8.4	
Larry Hughes	G	Saint Louis	1	2011–2012	9	114	5	7	12	12.7	0.6	0.8	1.3	
Ryan Humphrey	F	Notre Dame	1	2002–2003	35	322	69	7	64	9.2	2.0	0.2	1.8	
Brandon Hunter	F	Ohio	1	2004–2005	31	224	69	3	95	7.2	2.2	0.1	3.1	
Steven Hunter	C	DePaul	3	2001–2004	145	1,752	360	23	506	12.1	2.5	0.2	3.5	

=== I to K ===
All-time roster
Player	Pos.	Pre-draft team	Yrs	Seasons	Statistics									Ref.
Player	Pos.	Pre-draft team	Yrs	Seasons	GP	MP	REB	AST	PTS	MPG	RPG	APG	PPG	Ref.
Serge Ibaka	F/C	(Spain) CB L'Hospitalet	1	2016–2017	56	1,710	382	60	846	30.5	6.8	1.1	15.1	
Ersan İlyasova	F	(Turkey) Ülkerspor	1	2015–2016	22	447	121	12	178	20.3	5.5	0.5	8.1	
Joe Ingles	F	(Australia) South Dragons	1	2023–2024	68	1,169	142	203	296	17.2	2.1	3.0	4.4	
Jonathan Isaac^{x}	F	Florida State	7	2017–2020; 2022–2026	328	6,161	1,491	244	2,231	18.8	4.5	0.7	6.8	
Wes Iwundu	F	Kansas State	3	2017–2020	182	3,206	452	190	868	17.6	2.5	1.0	4.8	
Jaren Jackson	G/F	Georgetown	1	2001–2002	9	144	17	8	39	16.0	1.9	0.9	4.3	
Amile Jefferson	F	Duke	2	2018–2020	30	142	44	7	42	4.7	1.5	0.2	1.4	
Brandon Jennings	G	Oak Hill Academy (VA)	1	2015–2016	25	452	50	100	175	18.1	2.0	4.0	7.0	
Britton Johnsen	F	Utah	1	2003–2004	20	290	45	12	42	14.5	2.3	0.6	2.1	
Anthony Johnson	G	College of Charleston	3	1999–2000; 2008–2010	129	2,101	207	276	613	16.3	1.6	2.1	4.8	
B. J. Johnson	F	La Salle	2	2019–2020; 2021–2022	14	148	30	3	56	10.6	2.1	0.2	4.0	
DeQuan Jones	F	Miami (FL)	1	2012–2013	63	803	105	16	233	12.7	1.7	0.3	3.7	
Mark Jones	G	UCF	1	2004–2005	10	116	13	6	23	11.6	1.3	0.6	2.3	
Solomon Jones	F	South Florida	1	2013–2014	11	85	16	2	14	7.7	1.5	0.2	1.3	
Tyus Jones	G	Duke	1	2025–2026	48	754	53	116	144	15.7	1.1	2.4	3.0	
Cory Joseph	G	Texas	1	2024–2025	50	612	74	72	177	12.2	1.5	1.4	3.5	
Mario Kasun	C	(Germany) Skyliners Frankfurt	2	2004–2006	73	569	188	11	198	7.8	2.6	0.2	2.7	
Shawn Kemp	F/C	Concord HS (IN)	1	2002–2003	79	1,633	451	55	537	20.7	5.7	0.7	6.8	
Tim Kempton	F/C	Notre Dame	1	1997–1998	3	15	1	1	0	5.0	0.3	0.3	0.0	
Jonathan Kerner	C	East Carolina	1	1998–1999	1	5	0	0	0	5.0	0.0	0.0	0.0	
Steve Kerr	G	Arizona	1	1992–1993	47	440	38	59	122	9.4	0.8	1.3	2.6	
Greg Kite	C	BYU	4	1990–1994	247	4,653	1,253	117	746	18.8	5.1	0.5	3.0	
Jon Koncak	F/C	SMU	1	1995–1996	67	1,288	272	51	203	19.2	4.1	0.8	3.0	
Larry Krystkowiak	F/C	Montana	1	1993–1994	34	682	123	35	173	20.1	3.6	1.0	5.1	

=== L to M ===
All-time roster
Player	Pos.	Pre-draft team	Yrs	Seasons	Statistics									Ref.
Player	Pos.	Pre-draft team	Yrs	Seasons	GP	MP	REB	AST	PTS	MPG	RPG	APG	PPG	Ref.
Doron Lamb	G	Kentucky	2	2012–2014	77	992	78	55	267	12.9	1.0	0.7	3.5	
Vic Law	F	Northwestern	1	2019–2020	8	62	11	3	15	7.8	1.4	0.4	1.9	
Jason Lawson	C	Villanova	1	1997–1998	17	80	27	5	26	4.7	1.6	0.3	1.5	
Courtney Lee	G	Western Kentucky	1	2008–2009	77	1,939	178	91	646	25.2	2.3	1.2	8.4	
Rashard Lewis	F	Alief Elsik HS (TX)	4	2007–2011	257	9,114	1,314	537	4,194	35.5	5.1	2.1	16.3	
Todd Lichti	G/F	Stanford	1	1993–1994	4	20	4	2	8	5.0	1.0	0.5	2.0	
DeAndre Liggins	G	Kentucky	1	2011–2012	17	115	15	5	33	6.8	0.9	0.3	1.9	
Robin Lopez	C	Stanford	1	2021–2022	36	612	126	54	254	17.0	3.5	1.5	7.1	
Tyronn Lue	G	Nebraska	2	2003–2004; 2008–2009	90	2,461	198	331	841	27.3	2.2	3.7	9.3	
Shelvin Mack	G	Butler	1	2017–2018	69	1,365	166	272	473	19.8	2.4	3.9	6.9	
Josh Magette	G	Alabama–Huntsville	1	2019–2020	8	38	6	5	12	4.8	0.8	0.6	1.5	
Corey Maggette	F	Duke	1	1999–2000	77	1,370	303	61	646	17.8	3.9	0.8	8.4	
Karim Mané	G	Vanier	1	2020–2021	10	88	14	4	11	8.8	1.4	0.4	1.1	
Devyn Marble	G/F	Iowa	2	2014–2016	44	457	69	29	97	10.4	1.6	0.7	2.2	
Jarell Martin	F	LSU	1	2018–2019	42	328	73	18	115	7.8	1.7	0.4	2.7	
Frank Mason	G	Kansas	1	2020–2021	4	79	12	12	25	19.8	3.0	3.0	6.3	
Jason Maxiell	F	Cincinnati	1	2013–2014	34	488	86	9	109	14.4	2.5	0.3	3.2	
Vernon Maxwell	G	Florida	1	1997–1998	11	169	13	12	81	15.4	1.2	1.1	7.4	
Amal McCaskill	F/C	Marquette	1	1996–1997	17	109	22	7	28	6.4	1.3	0.4	1.6	
Mac McClung	G	Texas Tech	1	2024–2025	2	10	1	3	0	5.0	0.5	1.5	0.0	
Tracy McGrady^	G/F	MZCA (NC)	4	2000–2004	295	11,628	2,067	1,533	8,298	39.4	7.0	5.2	28.1	
Mark McNamara	F/C	California	1	1990–1991	2	13	4	0	0	6.5	2.0	0.0	0.0	
Josh McRoberts	F	Duke	1	2012–2013	41	685	137	70	159	16.7	3.3	1.7	3.9	
Jodie Meeks	G	Kentucky	1	2016–2017	36	738	77	45	327	20.5	2.1	1.3	9.1	
Ron Mercer	G/F	Kentucky	1	1999–2000	31	969	98	54	470	31.3	3.2	1.7	15.2	
Darko Miličić	F/C	(Serbia) Vršac	2	2005–2007	110	2,540	560	122	868	23.1	5.1	1.1	7.9	
Mike Miller	G/F	Florida	3	2000–2003	194	6,339	886	477	2,737	32.7	4.6	2.5	14.1	
Cuttino Mobley	G	Rhode Island	1	2004–2005	23	726	63	42	369	31.6	2.7	1.8	16.0	
E'Twaun Moore	G/F	Purdue	2	2012–2014	154	3,188	303	318	1,087	20.7	2.0	2.1	7.1	
Alex Morales^{x}	G	Wagner	1	2025–2026	4	24	3	4	8	6.0	0.8	1.0	2.0	
Terence Morris	F	Maryland	1	2005–2006	22	192	38	4	35	8.7	1.7	0.2	1.6	
Mychal Mulder	G	Kentucky	1	2021–2022	15	195	21	3	55	13.0	1.4	0.2	3.7	

=== N to P ===
All-time roster
Player	Pos.	Pre-draft team	Yrs	Seasons	Statistics									Ref.
Player	Pos.	Pre-draft team	Yrs	Seasons	GP	MP	REB	AST	PTS	MPG	RPG	APG	PPG	Ref.
Lee Nailon	F	TCU	1	2003–2004	8	83	14	4	29	10.4	1.8	0.5	3.6	
Shabazz Napier	G	UConn	1	2015–2016	55	600	55	97	203	10.9	1.0	1.8	3.7	
Jameer Nelson^{+}	G	Saint Joseph's	10	2004–2014	651	19,038	2,038	3,501	8,184	29.2	3.1	5.4	12.6	
Andrew Nicholson	F	St. Bonaventure	4	2012–2016	247	3,738	796	116	1,600	15.1	3.2	0.5	6.5	
Chuma Okeke	F	Auburn	4	2020–2024	189	3,832	704	276	1,189	20.3	3.7	1.5	6.3	
Victor Oladipo	G	Indiana	3	2013–2016	224	7,439	976	904	3,551	33.2	4.4	4.0	15.9	
Jawann Oldham	C	Seattle	1	1989–1990	3	36	15	0	4	12.0	5.0	0.0	1.3	
Kevin Ollie	G	UConn	2	1997–1999	20	220	19	33	78	11.0	1.0	1.7	3.9	
Shaquille O'Neal (#32)^	C	LSU	4	1992–1996	295	11,164	3,691	716	8,019	37.8	12.5	2.4	27.2	
Arinze Onuaku	C	Syracuse	1	2016–2017	8	28	6	2	4	3.5	0.8	0.3	0.5	
Kyle O'Quinn	F/C	Norfolk State	3	2012–2015	177	2,650	772	189	955	15.0	4.4	1.1	5.4	
Daniel Orton	F/C	Kentucky	1	2011–2012	16	187	39	5	45	11.7	2.4	0.3	2.8	
Bo Outlaw	F	Houston	8	1997–2002; 2005–2008	360	9,646	2,160	777	2,252	26.8	6.0	2.2	6.3	
Doug Overton	G	La Salle	1	1998–1999	6	33	2	3	18	5.5	0.3	0.5	3.0	
Olumide Oyedeji	C	(Germany) DJK Würzburg	1	2002–2003	27	145	50	5	27	5.4	1.9	0.2	1.0	
Zaza Pachulia	C	(Turkey) Ülkerspor	1	2003–2004	59	664	174	13	194	11.3	2.9	0.2	3.3	
Anthony Parker	G	Bradley	1	1999–2000	16	185	27	10	57	11.6	1.7	0.6	3.6	
Adreian Payne	F/C	Michigan State	1	2017–2018	5	43	9	0	21	8.6	1.8	0.0	4.2	
Elfrid Payton	G	Louisiana	4	2014–2018	281	8,303	1,171	1,805	3,128	29.5	4.2	6.4	11.1	
Noah Penda^{x}	F	(France) JA Vichy-Clermont	1	2025–2026	59	757	187	70	227	12.8	3.2	1.2	3.8	
Desmond Penigar	F	Utah State	1	2003–2004	10	89	24	3	32	8.9	2.4	0.3	3.2	
Elliot Perry	G	Memphis	1	2000–2001	6	39	4	5	10	6.5	0.7	0.8	1.7	
Mickaël Piétrus	G/F	(France) Élan Béarnais	3	2008–2011	148	3,434	441	124	1,288	23.2	3.0	0.8	8.7	
Otto Porter Jr.	F	Georgetown	1	2020–2021	3	66	14	5	24	22.0	4.7	1.7	8.0	
Mark Price	G	Georgia Tech	1	1997–1998	63	1,430	129	297	597	22.7	2.0	4.7	9.5	
Ronnie Price	G	Utah Valley	1	2013–2014	31	377	43	66	74	12.2	1.4	2.1	2.4	
Rodney Purvis	G	UConn	1	2017–2018	16	290	27	17	96	18.1	1.7	1.1	6.0	

=== Q to S ===
All-time roster
Player	Pos.	Pre-draft team	Yrs	Seasons	Statistics									Ref.
Player	Pos.	Pre-draft team	Yrs	Seasons	GP	MP	REB	AST	PTS	MPG	RPG	APG	PPG	Ref.
Trevelin Queen	G	New Mexico State	2	2023–2025	45	595	74	56	192	13.2	1.6	1.2	4.3	
Chasson Randle	G	Stanford	1	2020–2021	41	837	82	74	266	20.4	2.0	1.8	6.5	
JJ Redick	G	Duke	7	2006–2013	396	8,670	721	769	3,662	21.9	1.8	1.9	9.2	
Don Reid	F	Georgetown	2	2000–2002	133	1,478	418	48	434	11.1	3.1	0.4	3.3	
Jerry Reynolds	G/F	LSU	3	1989–1992	193	4,819	771	534	2,447	25.0	4.0	2.8	12.7	
Jase Richardson^{x}	G	Michigan State	1	2025–2026	54	587	63	58	239	10.9	1.2	1.1	4.4	
Jason Richardson	G	Michigan State	2	2010–2012	109	3,510	414	218	1,395	32.2	3.8	2.0	12.8	
Jeremy Richardson	G/F	Delta State	1	2008–2009	12	93	14	3	37	7.8	1.2	0.3	3.1	
Quentin Richardson	G	DePaul	2	2010–2012	105	1,821	301	76	464	17.3	2.9	0.7	4.4	
Luke Ridnour	G	Oregon	1	2014–2015	47	683	68	96	188	14.5	1.4	2.0	4.0	
Stanley Roberts	C	LSU	1	1991–1992	55	1,118	336	39	573	20.3	6.1	0.7	10.4	
James Robinson	G	Alabama	1	2000–2001	6	50	8	0	10	8.3	1.3	0.0	1.7	
Orlando Robinson	C	Fresno State	1	2025–2026	4	25	4	3	7	6.3	1.0	0.8	1.8	
Tree Rollins	C	Clemson	2	1993–1995	96	862	191	18	137	9.0	2.0	0.2	1.4	
Sean Rooks	C	Arizona	1	2003–2004	20	270	47	18	61	13.5	2.4	0.9	3.1	
Terrence Ross	G/F	Washington	7	2016–2023	349	9,126	1,047	576	4,427	26.1	3.0	1.7	12.7	
Donald Royal	F	Notre Dame	6	1992–1998	288	5,844	980	383	2,242	20.3	3.4	1.3	7.8	
Damjan Rudež	F	(Croatia) Split	1	2016–2017	45	314	25	20	82	7.0	0.6	0.4	1.8	
Jeryl Sasser	G	SMU	2	2001–2003	82	1,061	191	67	204	12.9	2.3	0.8	2.5	
Danny Schayes	F/C	Syracuse	3	1996–1999	138	1,955	381	62	567	14.2	2.8	0.4	4.1	
Admiral Schofield	F	Tennessee	3	2021–2024	98	1,004	168	63	327	10.2	1.7	0.6	3.3	
Dennis Scott	F	Georgia Tech	7	1990–1997	446	13,692	1,363	1,034	6,603	30.7	3.1	2.3	14.8	
Jay Scrubb	G	John A. Logan	1	2022–2023	2	30	6	1	13	15.0	3.0	0.5	6.5	
Rony Seikaly	C	Syracuse	2	1996–1998	121	4,099	1,058	161	1,981	33.9	8.7	1.3	16.4	
Brian Shaw	G	UC Santa Barbara	3	1994–1997	230	5,382	659	1,061	1,550	23.4	2.9	4.6	6.7	
Jonathon Simmons	G/F	Houston	2	2017–2019	110	2,874	339	266	1,245	26.1	3.1	2.4	11.3	
Miles Simon	G	Arizona	1	1998–1999	5	19	2	0	2	3.8	0.4	0.0	0.4	
Scott Skiles	G	Michigan State	5	1989–1994	384	11,940	1,110	2,776	4,966	31.1	2.9	7.2	12.9	
Ish Smith	G	Wake Forest	2	2011–2013	56	549	72	89	130	9.8	1.3	1.6	2.3	
Jason Smith	F/C	Colorado State	1	2015–2016	76	1,181	219	62	546	15.5	2.9	0.8	7.2	
Kenny Smith	G	North Carolina	1	1996–1997	6	47	2	4	17	7.8	0.3	0.7	2.8	
Otis Smith	G/F	Jacksonville	3	1989–1992	195	4,406	805	373	2,229	22.6	4.1	1.9	11.4	
Marreese Speights	F/C	Florida	1	2017–2018	52	675	133	40	402	13.0	2.6	0.8	7.7	
Felton Spencer	C	Louisville	1	1996–1997	1	19	6	1	4	19.0	6.0	1.0	4.0	
DeShawn Stevenson	G	Washington Union HS (CA)	3	2003–2006	163	4,670	463	295	1,620	28.7	2.8	1.8	9.9	
Rod Strickland	G	DePaul	1	2003–2004	46	915	118	185	311	19.9	2.6	4.0	6.8	
Derek Strong	F	Xavier	4	1996–2000	204	4,485	1,151	145	1,712	22.0	5.6	0.7	8.4	
Jalen Suggs^{x}	G	Gonzaga	5	2021–2026	268	7,154	922	1,010	3,384	26.7	3.4	3.8	12.6	

=== T to Z ===
All-time roster
Player	Pos.	Pre-draft team	Yrs	Seasons	Statistics									Ref.
Player	Pos.	Pre-draft team	Yrs	Seasons	GP	MP	REB	AST	PTS	MPG	RPG	APG	PPG	Ref.
Johnny Taylor	F	Chattanooga	2	1997–1998; 1999–2000	17	137	18	2	49	8.1	1.1	0.1	2.9	
Reggie Theus	G	UNLV	1	1989–1990	76	2,350	221	407	1,438	30.9	2.9	5.4	18.9	
Adonis Thomas	F	Memphis	1	2013–2014	4	24	3	2	7	6.0	0.8	0.5	1.8	
Carl Thomas	G	Eastern Michigan	1	1997–1998	4	15	0	1	9	3.8	0.0	0.3	2.3	
Brooks Thompson	G	Oklahoma State	2	1994–1996	71	492	47	74	256	6.9	0.7	1.0	3.6	
Stephen Thompson	G	Syracuse	1	1991–1992	1	15	1	1	2	15.0	1.0	1.0	2.0	
Sindarius Thornwell	G	South Carolina	1	2020–2021	7	144	13	17	24	20.6	1.9	2.4	3.4	
Tom Tolbert	F/C	Arizona	1	1992–1993	72	1,838	412	91	583	25.5	5.7	1.3	8.1	
Keith Tower	F/C	Notre Dame	2	1993–1995	14	39	9	1	9	2.8	0.6	0.1	0.6	
Hedo Türkoğlu	F	(Turkey) Anadolu Efes	8	2004–2009; 2010–2013	497	16,233	2,221	1,927	7,216	32.7	4.5	3.9	14.5	
Jeff Turner	F/C	Vanderbilt	7	1989–1996	411	8,162	1,484	453	2,672	19.9	3.6	1.1	6.5	
Beno Udrih	G	(Italy) Olimpia Milano	1	2012–2013	27	738	63	164	275	27.3	2.3	6.1	10.2	
David Vaughn	F	Memphis	2	1995–1997	68	564	175	15	145	8.3	2.6	0.2	2.1	
Jacque Vaughn	G	Kansas	1	2002–2003	80	1,686	118	232	473	21.1	1.5	2.9	5.9	
Rashad Vaughn	G	UNLV	1	2017–2018	5	35	4	0	5	7.0	0.8	0.0	1.0	
Sam Vincent	G	Michigan State	3	1989–1992	151	3,517	402	699	1,522	23.3	2.7	4.6	10.1	
Nikola Vučević^{+}	C	USC	9	2012–2021	591	18,791	6,381	1,668	10,423	31.8	10.8	2.8	17.6	
Von Wafer	G	Florida State	1	2011–2012	33	469	45	29	194	14.2	1.4	0.9	5.9	
Franz Wagner^{x}	F	Michigan	5	2021–2026	325	10,417	1,585	1,180	6,251	32.1	4.9	3.6	19.2	
Moritz Wagner^{x}	C	Michigan	6	2020–2026	277	4,761	1,155	348	2,786	17.2	4.2	1.3	10.1	
Ben Wallace^	F/C	Virginia Union	1	1999–2000	81	1,959	665	67	390	24.2	8.2	0.8	4.8	
C. J. Watson	G	Tennessee	2	2015–2017	95	1,668	155	202	423	17.6	1.6	2.1	4.5	
Spud Webb	G	NC State	1	1997–1998	4	34	3	5	12	8.5	0.8	1.3	3.0	
Chris Whitney	G	Clemson	1	2002–2003	22	290	21	21	78	13.2	1.0	1.0	3.5	
C. J. Wilcox	G	Washington	1	2016–2017	22	108	12	12	21	4.9	0.5	0.5	1.0	
Morlon Wiley	G	Long Beach State	3	1989–1992	83	1,078	76	200	363	13.0	0.9	2.4	4.4	
Dominique Wilkins^	G/F	Georgia	1	1998–1999	27	252	71	16	134	9.3	2.6	0.6	5.0	
Gerald Wilkins	G/F	Chattanooga	3	1996–1999	155	3,482	264	252	1,230	22.5	1.7	1.6	7.9	
Brian Williams	F/C	Arizona	2	1991–1993	69	1,145	328	38	533	16.6	4.8	0.6	7.7	
Jason Williams	G	Florida	2	2009–2011	98	1,874	148	322	526	19.1	1.5	3.3	5.4	
Lorenzo Williams	F/C	Stetson	2	1992–1994	6	29	6	2	2	4.8	1.0	0.3	0.3	
Monty Williams	F	Notre Dame	3	1999–2002	225	3,996	728	281	1,545	17.8	3.2	1.2	6.9	
Shammond Williams	G	North Carolina	1	2003–2004	37	525	43	64	183	14.2	1.2	1.7	4.9	
Joe Wolf	F/C	North Carolina	1	1995–1996	63	1,047	185	63	291	16.6	2.9	1.0	4.6	
Howard Wright	F	Stanford	2	1990–1991; 1992–1993	12	146	39	3	51	12.2	3.3	0.3	4.3	
Stephen Zimmerman	C	UNLV	1	2016–2017	19	108	35	4	23	5.7	1.8	0.2	1.2	

== Single Game Leaders ==
Points
Rank	Player	Points	Date
1	Tracy McGrady	62	March 10, 2004
2	Shaquille O'Neal	53	April 20, 1994
3	Tracy McGrady	52	February 21, 2003
4	Tracy McGrady	51	November 14, 2003
5	Nick Anderson	50	April 23, 1993
5	Paolo Banchero	50	October 28, 2024
5	Tracy McGrady	50	March 8, 2002

Source: https://stathead.com/tiny/Q80Ry

Rebounds
Rank	Player	Rebounds	Date
1	Nikola Vučević	29	December 31, 2012
2	Shaquille O'Neal	28	November 20, 1993
3	Dwight Howard	26	April 15, 2006
4	Dwight Howard	25	March 13, 2012
4	Dwight Howard	25	January 10, 2007
4	Dwight Howard	25	January 18, 2012
4	Shaquille O'Neal	25	April 20, 1993

Source: https://stathead.com/tiny/HPSwv

Assists
Rank	Player	Assists	Date
1	Scott Skiles	30*	December 30, 1990
2	Scott Skiles	21	April 16, 1993
3	Scott Skiles	20	December 1, 1993
3	Scott Skiles	20	March 8, 1991
5	Penny Hardaway	19	April 13, 1995
5	Scott Skiles	19	February 17, 1993

*NBA Record

Source: https://stathead.com/tiny/gHK6D
