= Franz Wagner (disambiguation) =

Franz Wagner (born 2001) is a German basketball player

Franz Wagner may also refer to:

- Franz Wagner (footballer) (1911–1974), Austrian footballer
- Franz Josef Wagner (1943–2025), German author and journalist
- Franz Xaver Wagner (1939–2011), German comedian and author

== See also ==
- Franz Wegner (born 1940), professor for theoretical physics
- Frank Wagner (disambiguation)
