= 2025–26 Orlando Magic season =

2025–26 NBA season by team

- Head coach: Jamahl Mosley
- President: Jeff Weltman
- General manager: Anthony Parker
- Owners: RDV Sports, Inc.
- Arena: Kia Center

Results
- Record: 45–37 (.549)
- Place: Division: 2nd (Southeast); Conference: 8th (Eastern)
- Playoff finish: First round (lost to Pistons 3–4)
- Stats at Basketball Reference

Local media
- Television: FanDuel Sports Network Florida; Over-the-air affiliates (Note: Affiliates include: WESH/WKCF (Orlando); WMOR-TV (Tampa); WCJB-TV/WCJB-DT2/WCJB-DT3 (Gainesville)) (10 simulcasts)
- Radio: 96.9 The Game

The 2025–26 Orlando Magic season was the 37th season for the franchise in the National Basketball Association (NBA). The team fully adopted its new identity this season, officially retiring the look that had been in place since 2008–09.

The Magic advanced to the 2025 NBA Cup knockout stage as the winner of East Group B, as they finished the group stage with a perfect 4–0 record. They defeated the Miami Heat in the quarterfinals but were eliminated by the eventual Cup champions New York Knicks in the semifinals.

On April 5, the Magic clinched a winning record, surpassing their win total from the previous season. On April 12, the Magic qualified for the play-in tournament as they finished the regular season with a 45–37 record, the same as the Philadelphia 76ers; however, since Philadelphia won the head-to-head tiebreaker 2–1, Orlando secured the 8th place in the Eastern Conference. Despite losing to Philadelphia in the first stage of the play-in, they beat the Charlotte Hornets in the No. 8 seed game, clinching a playoff spot for the third consecutive season. Despite taking an 3–1 series lead against the top-seeded Detroit Pistons in the first round of the playoffs, they were ultimately eliminated in seven games—a fate similar to the one they experienced in 2003. With the Boston Celtics blowing a 3–1 series lead the previous night against Philadelphia, this marks the first time that there were two blown 3–1 series leads in the same season since 2020. Notably, in Game 6 of this series that could have closed it out for Orlando, the Magic blew a 24-point lead in the third quarter by missing 23 straight shots in the 4th quarter, ultimately leading to a 93–79 defeat. That collapse ultimately led to the firing of coach Jamahl Mosley.

== Draft ==
Round	Pick	Player	Position	Nationality	College
1	25	Jase Richardson	Shooting Guard	United States	Michigan State
2	46	Amari Williams	Center	United Kingdom	Kentucky
2	57	Max Shulga	Shooting Guard	Ukraine	Virginia Commonwealth

The Magic entered the draft with one first-round pick and two second-round picks, consisting of their original second-round selection and two picks acquired via trades. The Magic acquired the Denver Nuggets' first-round pick that fell outside its top 5 protection when Denver made the 2025 NBA playoffs, along with the Boston Celtics' second-round pick, which conveyed as the less favorable selection than that of the Memphis Grizzlies due to Boston's better 2024–25 regular season finish.

Ten days before the draft, they had traded their original first-round pick to the Memphis as an exchange for Desmond Bane. On the second day of the draft, the team traded the draft rights to both second-round selections, Max Shulga and Amari Williams, to Boston.

== Roster ==
2025–26 Orlando Magic roster
Players

Pos.	No.	Player	Height	Weight	DOB	From
F	5	Paolo Banchero	6 ft 10 in (2.08 m)	250 lb (113 kg)	2002-11-12	Duke
G	3	Desmond Bane	6 ft 6 in (1.98 m)	215 lb (98 kg)	1998-06-25	TCU
F/C	35	Goga Bitadze	6 ft 11 in (2.11 m)	250 lb (113 kg)	1999-07-20	Georgia
G	0	Anthony Black	6 ft 7 in (2.01 m)	200 lb (91 kg)	2004-01-24	Arkansas
F	8	Jamal Cain	6 ft 7 in (2.01 m)	191 lb (87 kg)	1999-03-20	Oakland
G	2	Jevon Carter	6 ft 0 in (1.83 m)	200 lb (91 kg)	1995-09-14	West Virginia
C	34	Wendell Carter Jr.	6 ft 10 in (2.08 m)	270 lb (122 kg)	1999-04-16	Duke
C	14	Colin Castleton (TW)	6 ft 10 in (2.08 m)	250 lb (113 kg)	2000-05-25	Florida
F	23	Tristan da Silva	6 ft 8 in (2.03 m)	217 lb (98 kg)	2001-05-15	Colorado
F	13	Jett Howard	6 ft 8 in (2.03 m)	215 lb (98 kg)	2003-09-14	Michigan
F	1	Jonathan Isaac	6 ft 10 in (2.08 m)	230 lb (104 kg)	1997-10-03	Florida State
G	30	Alex Morales (TW)	6 ft 6 in (1.98 m)	210 lb (95 kg)	1997-11-21	Wagner
G/F	93	Noah Penda	6 ft 7 in (2.01 m)	215 lb (98 kg)	2005-01-07	France
G	11	Jase Richardson	6 ft 1 in (1.85 m)	180 lb (82 kg)	2005-10-16	Michigan State
G	4	Jalen Suggs	6 ft 5 in (1.96 m)	205 lb (93 kg)	2001-06-03	Gonzaga
F	22	Franz Wagner	6 ft 10 in (2.08 m)	220 lb (100 kg)	2001-08-27	Michigan
F/C	21	Moritz Wagner	6 ft 11 in (2.11 m)	245 lb (111 kg)	1997-04-26	Michigan

Coaches
Head coach
- Jamahl Mosley
Assistant(s)
- Bret Brielmaier
- Lionel Chalmers
- Randy Gregory
- Dale Osbourne
- Joe Prunty
- God Shammgod

Legend
- (DP) Unsigned draft pick
- (FA) Free agent
- (S) Suspended
- (GL) On assignment to G League affiliate
- (TW) Two-way affiliate player
- Injured

Roster
Updated: November 15, 2025

== Standings ==
=== Division ===
Southeast Division	W	L	PCT	GB	Home	Road	Div	GP
y – Atlanta Hawks	46	36	.561	–	24‍–‍17	22‍–‍19	9‍–‍7	82
x – Orlando Magic	45	37	.549	1.0	26‍–‍16	19‍–‍21	9‍–‍8	82
pi – Charlotte Hornets	44	38	.537	2.0	21‍–‍20	23‍–‍18	11‍–‍5	82
pi – Miami Heat	43	39	.524	3.0	26‍–‍15	17‍–‍24	10‍–‍7	82
Washington Wizards	17	65	.207	29.0	11‍–‍30	6‍–‍35	2‍–‍14	82

=== Conference ===
Eastern Conference
#	Team	W	L	PCT	GB	GP
1	c – Detroit Pistons *	60	22	.732	–	82
2	y – Boston Celtics *	56	26	.683	4.0	82
3	x – New York Knicks	53	29	.646	7.0	82
4	x – Cleveland Cavaliers	52	30	.634	8.0	82
5	x – Toronto Raptors	46	36	.561	14.0	82
6	y – Atlanta Hawks *	46	36	.561	14.0	82
7	x – Philadelphia 76ers	45	37	.549	15.0	82
8	x – Orlando Magic	45	37	.549	15.0	82
9	pi – Charlotte Hornets	44	38	.537	16.0	82
10	pi – Miami Heat	43	39	.524	17.0	82
11	Milwaukee Bucks	32	50	.390	28.0	82
12	Chicago Bulls	31	51	.378	29.0	82
13	Brooklyn Nets	20	62	.244	40.0	82
14	Indiana Pacers	19	63	.232	41.0	82
15	Washington Wizards	17	65	.207	43.0	82

== Game log ==
=== Preseason ===
2025 preseason game log
Total: 4–0 (Home: 2–0; Road: 2–0)
Preseason: 4–0 (home: 2–0; road: 2–0)

Game	Date	Team	Score	High points	High rebounds	High assists	Location Attendance	Record
1	October 4	@ Miami	W 126–118	Jase Richardson (13)	Goga Bitadze (8)	Bane, Black, Morales (3)	(Puerto Rico) Coliseo José Miguel Agrelot; 15,470	1–0
2	October 10	@ Philadelphia	W 128–98	Wendell Carter Jr. (20)	Wendell Carter Jr. (13)	Anthony Black (5)	Xfinity Mobile Arena; 16,496	2–0
3	October 12	Miami	W 120–104	Franz Wagner (17)	Goga Bitadze (8)	Black, Howard (4)	Kia Center; 18,846	3–0
4	October 16	New Orleans	W 132–125	Franz Wagner (24)	Paolo Banchero (10)	Carter Jr., Richardson (6)	Kia Center; 16,014	4–0

2025–26 preseason schedule

=== Regular season ===
2025–26 game log
Total: 45–37 (Home: 26–16; Road: 19–21)
October: 2–4 (home: 1–2; road: 1–2)

Game	Date	Team	Score	High points	High rebounds	High assists	Location Attendance	Record
1	October 22	Miami	W 125–121	Banchero, Wagner (24)	Paolo Banchero (11)	Franz Wagner (6)	Kia Center; 19,186	1−0
2	October 24	Atlanta	L 107–111	Franz Wagner (27)	Wendell Carter Jr. (8)	Desmond Bane (5)	Kia Center; 18,004	1–1
3	October 25	Chicago	L 98–110	Paolo Banchero (24)	Wendell Carter Jr. (13)	Desmond Bane (3)	Kia Center; 19,117	1–2
4	October 27	@ Philadelphia	L 124–136	Paolo Banchero (32)	Wendell Carter Jr. (10)	Jalen Suggs (6)	Xfinity Mobile Arena; 18,377	1–3
5	October 29	@ Detroit	L 116–135	Paolo Banchero (24)	Paolo Banchero (11)	Paolo Banchero (7)	Little Caesars Arena; 19,244	1–4
6	October 30	@ Charlotte	W 123–107	Franz Wagner (21)	Paolo Banchero (9)	Paolo Banchero (9)	Spectrum Center; 18,478	2–4

November: 10–4 (home: 6–1; road: 4–3)

Game	Date	Team	Score	High points	High rebounds	High assists	Location Attendance	Record
7	November 1	@ Washington	W 125–94	Paolo Banchero (28)	Wendell Carter Jr. (12)	Franz Wagner (6)	Capital One Arena; 14,602	3–4
8	November 4	@ Atlanta	L 112–127	Paolo Banchero (22)	Paolo Banchero (11)	Paolo Banchero (8)	State Farm Arena; 15,821	3–5
9	November 7	Boston	W 123–110	Franz Wagner (27)	Paolo Banchero (9)	Desmond Bane (7)	Kia Center; 19,154	4–5
10	November 9	Boston	L 107–111	Paolo Banchero (28)	Franz Wagner (9)	Desmond Bane (6)	Kia Center; 18,096	4–6
11	November 10	Portland	W 115–112	Paolo Banchero (28)	Banchero, Carter Jr., Wagner (9)	Desmond Bane (7)	Kia Center; 17,989	5–6
12	November 12	@ New York	W 124–107	Franz Wagner (28)	Franz Wagner (9)	Desmond Bane (8)	Madison Square Garden; 19,812	6–6
13	November 14	Brooklyn	W 105–98	Franz Wagner (25)	Tristan da Silva (9)	Jalen Suggs (6)	Kia Center; 17,902	7–6
14	November 16	@ Houston	L 113–117 (OT)	Franz Wagner (29)	Carter Jr., Isaac, da Silva (6)	Bane, Black, Wagner (4)	Toyota Center; 18,055	7–7
15	November 18	Golden State	W 121–113	Desmond Bane (23)	Wendell Carter Jr. (12)	Jalen Suggs (8)	Kia Center; 18,846	8–7
16	November 20	L.A. Clippers	W 129–101	Jalen Suggs (23)	Tristan da Silva (8)	Jalen Suggs (7)	Kia Center; 17,801	9–7
17	November 22	New York	W 133–121	Franz Wagner (37)	Bitadze, Isaac (7)	Franz Wagner (7)	Kia Center; 18,014	10–7
18	November 23	@ Boston	L 129–138	Jett Howard (30)	Penda, Wagner (8)	Tyus Jones (6)	TD Garden; 19,156	10–8
19	November 25	@ Philadelphia	W 144–103	Anthony Black (31)	Penda, Bitadze (9)	Jalen Suggs (11)	Xfinity Mobile Arena; 19,746	11–8
20	November 28	@ Detroit	W 112–109	Desmond Bane (37)	Wendell Carter Jr. (11)	Anthony Black (4)	Little Caesars Arena; 20,062	12–8

December: 7–7 (home: 4–3; road: 3–4)

Game	Date	Team	Score	High points	High rebounds	High assists	Location Attendance	Record
21	December 1	Chicago	W 125–120	Desmond Bane (37)	Anthony Black (9)	Tyus Jones (6)	Kia Center; 18,096	13–8
22	December 3	San Antonio	L 112–114	Franz Wagner (25)	Wendell Carter Jr. (9)	Bane, Wagner (6)	Kia Center; 17,643	13–9
23	December 5	Miami	W 106–105	Franz Wagner (32)	Bitadze, Black (8)	Anthony Black (6)	Kia Center; 17,794	14–9
24	December 7	@ New York	L 100–106	Jalen Suggs (17)	Anthony Black (11)	Tied (4)	Madison Square Garden; 19,812	14–10
25	December 9	Miami	W 117–108	Desmond Bane (37)	Wendell Carter Jr. (10)	Anthony Black (7)	Kia Center; 18,605	15–10
26	December 13	New York	L 120–132	Jalen Suggs (26)	Banchero, Black (8)	Bane, Suggs (7)	T-Mobile Arena; 16,697	15–11
27	December 18	@ Denver	L 115–126	Banchero, Carter Jr. (26)	Paolo Banchero (16)	Paolo Banchero (10)	Ball Arena; 19,731	15–12
28	December 20	@ Utah	W 128–127 (OT)	Desmond Bane (32)	Noah Penda (12)	Paolo Banchero (9)	Delta Center; 18,186	16–12
29	December 22	@ Golden State	L 97–120	Paolo Banchero (21)	Paolo Banchero (12)	Paolo Banchero (7)	Chase Center; 18,064	16–13
30	December 23	@ Portland	W 110–106	Desmond Bane (23)	Black, Carter Jr. (7)	Tyus Jones (7)	Moda Center; 17,073	17–13
31	December 26	Charlotte	L 105–120	Anthony Black (24)	Desmond Bane (10)	Bane, Black (4)	Kia Center; 19,397	17–14
32	December 27	Denver	W 127–126	Anthony Black (38)	Wendell Carter Jr. (7)	Tied (6)	Kia Center; 19,151	18–14
33	December 29	@ Toronto	L 106–107	Anthony Black (27)	Paolo Banchero (15)	Paolo Banchero (10)	Scotiabank Arena; 19,800	18–15
34	December 31	@ Indiana	W 112–110	Paolo Banchero (29)	Wendell Carter Jr. (11)	Desmond Bane (6)	Gainbridge Fieldhouse; 16,504	19–15

January: 6–7 (home: 4–3; road: 2–4)

Game	Date	Team	Score	High points	High rebounds	High assists	Location Attendance	Record
35	January 2	@ Chicago	L 114–121	Paolo Banchero (31)	Wendell Carter Jr. (10)	Anthony Black (7)	United Center; 21,245	19–16
36	January 4	Indiana	W 135–127	Desmond Bane (31)	Banchero, Carter Jr. (12)	Anthony Black (10)	Kia Center; 19,382	20–16
37	January 6	@ Washington	L 112–120	Jase Richardson (20)	Jonathan Isaac (8)	Tyus Jones (5)	Capital One Arena; 13,724	20–17
38	January 7	@ Brooklyn	W 104–103 (OT)	Paolo Banchero (30)	Paolo Banchero (14)	Banchero, Black (6)	Barclays Center; 16,916	21–17
39	January 9	Philadelphia	L 91–103	Desmond Bane (23)	Paolo Banchero (11)	Paolo Banchero (7)	Kia Center; 19,271	21–18
40	January 11	New Orleans	W 128–118	Desmond Bane (27)	Goga Bitadze (13)	Paolo Banchero (8)	Kia Center; 19,059	22–18
41	January 15	Memphis	W 118–111	Paolo Banchero (26)	Paolo Banchero (13)	Anthony Black (7)	(Germany) Uber Arena; 13,738	23–18
42	January 18	@ Memphis	L 109–126	Anthony Black (19)	Paolo Banchero (8)	Paolo Banchero (9)	(United Kingdom) The O_{2} Arena; 18,424	23–19
43	January 22	Charlotte	L 97–124	Paolo Banchero (23)	Paolo Banchero (7)	Paolo Banchero (5)	Kia Center; 19,423	23–20
44	January 24	Cleveland	L 105–119	Paolo Banchero (27)	Bitadze, M. Wagner (6)	Jalen Suggs (6)	Kia Center; 19,351	23–21
45	January 26	@ Cleveland	L 98–114	Paolo Banchero (37)	Paolo Banchero (10)	Jalen Suggs (6)	Rocket Arena; 19,432	23–22
46	January 28	@ Miami	W 133–124	Paolo Banchero (31)	Paolo Banchero (12)	Tyus Jones (9)	Kaseya Center; 19,700	24–22
47	January 30	Toronto	W 130–120	Desmond Bane (32)	Paolo Banchero (9)	Jalen Suggs (10)	Kia Center; 19,163	25–22

February: 6–5 (home: 3–2; road: 3–3)

Game	Date	Team	Score	High points	High rebounds	High assists	Location Attendance	Record
48	February 1	@ San Antonio	L 103–112	Desmond Bane (25)	Paolo Banchero (10)	Jalen Suggs (6)	Frost Bank Center; 18,354	25–23
49	February 3	@ Oklahoma City	L 92–128	Jalen Suggs (20)	Wendell Carter Jr. (7)	Jalen Suggs (6)	Paycom Center; 18,203	25–24
50	February 5	Brooklyn	W 118–98	Desmond Bane (23)	Jalen Suggs (11)	Jalen Suggs (11)	Kia Center; 18,093	26–24
51	February 7	Utah	W 120–117	Paolo Banchero (23)	Moritz Wagner (8)	Paolo Banchero (8)	Kia Center; 19,203	27–24
52	February 9	Milwaukee	W 118–99	Anthony Black (26)	Paolo Banchero (9)	Jalen Suggs (10)	Kia Center; 18,202	28–24
53	February 11	Milwaukee	L 108–116	Desmond Bane (31)	Wendell Carter Jr. (11)	Jalen Suggs (10)	Kia Center; 18,298	28–25
All-Star Game
54	February 19	@ Sacramento	W 131–94	Paolo Banchero (30)	Wendell Carter Jr. (8)	Paolo Banchero (6)	Golden 1 Center; 16,544	29–25
55	February 21	@ Phoenix	L 110–113 (2OT)	Desmond Bane (34)	Paolo Banchero (14)	Paolo Banchero (8)	Mortgage Matchup Center; 17,071	29–26
56	February 22	@ L.A. Clippers	W 111–109	Desmond Bane (36)	Wendell Carter Jr. (14)	Paolo Banchero (8)	Intuit Dome; 17,927	30–26
57	February 24	@ L.A. Lakers	W 110–109	Paolo Banchero (36)	Wendell Carter Jr. (11)	Banchero, Bane (6)	Crypto.com Arena; 18,997	31–26
58	February 26	Houston	L 108–113	Desmond Bane (30)	Paolo Banchero (8)	Paolo Banchero (9)	Kia Center; 17,524	31–27

March: 9–8 (home: 6–4; road: 3–4)

Game	Date	Team	Score	High points	High rebounds	High assists	Location Attendance	Record
59	March 1	Detroit	L 92–106	Paolo Banchero (24)	Paolo Banchero (11)	Desmond Bane (7)	Kia Center; 19,015	31–28
60	March 3	Washington	W 126–109	Paolo Banchero (37)	Tristan da Silva (9)	Jalen Suggs (9)	Kia Center; 16,894	32–28
61	March 5	Dallas	W 115–114	Tristan da Silva (19)	Paolo Banchero (12)	Jalen Suggs (7)	Kia Center; 16,996	33–28
62	March 7	@ Minnesota	W 119–92	Desmond Bane (30)	Paolo Banchero (15)	Tied (4)	Target Center; 18,978	34–28
63	March 8	@ Milwaukee	W 130–91	Paolo Banchero (33)	Moritz Wagner (9)	Desmond Bane (9)	Fiserv Forum; 15,555	35–28
64	March 11	Cleveland	W 128–122	Desmond Bane (35)	Wendell Carter Jr. (11)	Paolo Banchero (7)	Kia Center; 18,697	36–28
65	March 12	Washington	W 136–131 (OT)	Jalen Suggs (28)	Wendell Carter Jr. (11)	Jalen Suggs (8)	Kia Center; 17,321	37–28
66	March 14	@ Miami	W 121–117	Paolo Banchero (27)	Tied (8)	Paolo Banchero (7)	Kaseya Center; 19,757	38–28
67	March 16	@ Atlanta	L 112–124	Banchero, Bane (18)	Paolo Banchero (10)	Jalen Suggs (5)	State Farm Arena; 18,138	38–29
68	March 17	Oklahoma City	L 108–113	Paolo Banchero (32)	Paolo Banchero (10)	Jalen Suggs (6)	Kia Center; 18,846	38–30
69	March 19	@ Charlotte	L 111–130	Desmond Bane (24)	Desmond Bane (7)	Paolo Banchero (7)	Spectrum Center; 19,565	38–31
70	March 21	L.A. Lakers	L 104–105	Paolo Banchero (16)	Wendell Carter Jr. (9)	Banchero, Suggs (6)	Kia Center; 19,597	38–32
71	March 23	Indiana	L 126–128	Paolo Banchero (39)	Goga Bitadze (7)	Desmond Bane (7)	Kia Center; 17,721	38–33
72	March 24	@ Cleveland	L 131–136	Paolo Banchero (36)	Desmond Bane (7)	Paolo Banchero (5)	Rocket Arena; 19,432	38–34
73	March 26	Sacramento	W 121–117	Paolo Banchero (30)	Wendell Carter Jr. (11)	Paolo Banchero (7)	Kia Center; 17,256	39–34
74	March 29	@ Toronto	L 87–139	Desmond Bane (17)	Paolo Banchero (5)	Jalen Suggs (5)	Scotiabank Arena; 18,883	39–35
75	March 31	Phoenix	W 115–111	Desmond Bane (21)	Wendell Carter Jr. (12)	Paolo Banchero (8)	Kia Center; 19,117	40–35

April: 5–2 (home: 2–1; road: 3–1)

Game	Date	Team	Score	High points	High rebounds	High assists	Location Attendance	Record
76	April 1	Atlanta	L 101–130	Jamal Cain (17)	Paolo Banchero (8)	Jalen Suggs (9)	Kia Center; 17,324	40–36
77	April 3	@ Dallas	W 138–127	Wendell Carter Jr. (28)	Banchero, Bane (7)	Jalen Suggs (9)	American Airlines Center; 19,358	41–36
78	April 5	@ New Orleans	W 112–108	Desmond Bane (27)	Paolo Banchero (16)	Jalen Suggs (8)	Smoothie King Center; 16,629	42–36
79	April 6	Detroit	W 123–107	Paolo Banchero (31)	Jalen Suggs (6)	Jalen Suggs (12)	Kia Center; 19,441	43–36
80	April 8	Minnesota	W 132–120	Paolo Banchero (20)	Goga Bitadze (15)	Tied (6)	Kia Center; 18,482	44–36
81	April 10	@ Chicago	W 127–103	Franz Wagner (25)	Goga Bitadze (11)	Paolo Banchero (7)	United Center; 21,522	45–36
82	April 12	@ Boston	L 108–113	Banchero, Suggs (23)	Paolo Banchero (10)	Paolo Banchero (11)	TD Garden; 19,156	45–37

2025–26 season schedule

=== Play-in ===
2026 play-in game log
Total: 1–1 (Home: 1–0; Road: 0–1)
Play-in: 1–1 (home: 1–0; road: 0–1)

Game	Date	Team	Score	High points	High rebounds	High assists	Location Attendance	Record
1	April 15	@ Philadelphia	L 97–109	Desmond Bane (34)	Wendell Carter Jr. (11)	Banchero, Suggs (4)	Xfinity Mobile Arena; 19,746	0–1
2	April 17	Charlotte	W 121–90	Paolo Banchero (25)	Bane, F. Wagner (7)	Tied (6)	Kia Center; 19,005	1–1

2025–26 season schedule

=== Playoffs ===
2026 playoff game log
Total: 3–4 (home: 2–1; road: 1–3)
First Round: 3–4 (home: 2–1; road: 1–3)

Game	Date	Team	Score	High points	High rebounds	High assists	Location Attendance	Series
1	April 19	@ Detroit	W 112–101	Paolo Banchero (23)	Paolo Banchero (9)	Bane, Carter Jr. (5)	Little Caesars Arena; 20,062	1–0
2	April 22	@ Detroit	L 83–98	Jalen Suggs (19)	Franz Wagner (7)	Paolo Banchero (8)	Little Caesars Arena; 20,062	1–1
3	April 25	Detroit	W 113–105	Banchero, Bane (25)	Wendell Carter Jr. (17)	Paolo Banchero (9)	Kia Center; 18,846	2–1
4	April 27	Detroit	W 94–88	Desmond Bane (22)	Wendell Carter Jr. (11)	Banchero, Carter Jr. (4)	Kia Center; 19,040	3–1
5	April 29	@ Detroit	L 109–116	Paolo Banchero (45)	Paolo Banchero (9)	Paolo Banchero (7)	Little Caesars Arena; 20,062	3–2
6	May 1	Detroit	L 79–93	Banchero, Bane (17)	Paolo Banchero (10)	Jalen Suggs (7)	Kia Center; 19,205	3–3
7	May 3	@ Detroit	L 94–116	Paolo Banchero (38)	Paolo Banchero (9)	Paolo Banchero (6)	Little Caesars Arena; 20,062	3–4

2026 playoff schedule

=== NBA Cup ===
==== East Group B ====
Pos	Team	Pld	W	L	PF	PA	PD	Qualification
1	Orlando Magic	4	4	0	484	420	+64	Advanced to knockout rounds
2	Boston Celtics	4	2	2	441	458	−17	
3	Detroit Pistons	4	2	2	462	441	+21	
4	Philadelphia 76ers	4	1	3	431	470	−39	
5	Brooklyn Nets	4	1	3	421	450	−29	

Source: NBA

== Player statistics ==
=== Regular season ===
Player	POS	GP	GS	MP	REB	AST	STL	BLK	PTS	MPG	RPG	APG	SPG	BPG	PPG
Desmond Bane	SG	82	82	2,756	338	338	86	37	1,647	33.6	4.1	4.1	1.0	.5	20.1
Wendell Carter Jr.	C	78	78	2,288	577	154	60	49	922	29.3	7.4	2.0	.8	.6	11.8
Tristan da Silva	SF	77	34	1,899	284	124	68	25	762	24.7	3.7	1.6	.9	.3	9.9
Paolo Banchero	PF	72	72	2,502	604	373	51	40	1,599	34.8	8.4	5.2	.7	.6	22.2
Goga Bitadze	C	64	3	972	320	84	37	61	375	15.2	5.0	1.3	.6	1.0	5.9
Anthony Black	PG	64	40	1,910	244	236	91	45	959	29.8	3.8	3.7	1.4	.7	15.0
Noah Penda	SF	59	2	757	187	70	30	18	227	12.8	3.2	1.2	.5	.3	3.8
Jalen Suggs	PG	57	56	1,574	220	312	105	40	786	27.6	3.9	5.5	1.8	.7	13.8
Jett Howard	SF	55	0	695	87	45	10	11	301	12.6	1.6	.8	.2	.2	5.5
Jase Richardson	SG	54	0	587	63	58	19	2	239	10.9	1.2	1.1	.4	.0	4.4
Jonathan Isaac	PF	52	0	521	132	22	20	31	134	10.0	2.5	.4	.4	.6	2.6
Tyus Jones^{†}	PG	48	8	754	53	116	33	3	144	15.7	1.1	2.4	.7	.1	3.0
Jamal Cain	SF	40	1	486	78	29	11	4	215	12.2	2.0	.7	.3	.1	5.4
Moritz Wagner	C	36	0	427	115	27	15	2	247	11.9	3.2	.8	.4	.1	6.9
Franz Wagner	SF	34	32	1,019	177	113	32	11	699	30.0	5.2	3.3	.9	.3	20.6
Jevon Carter^{†}	PG	30	1	613	63	68	27	8	215	20.4	2.1	2.3	.9	.3	7.2
Colin Castleton	C	4	0	21	8	1	1	0	5	5.3	2.0	.3	.3	.0	1.3
Alex Morales	PG	4	0	24	3	4	0	0	8	6.0	.8	1.0	.0	.0	2.0
Orlando Robinson	C	4	1	25	4	3	1	0	7	6.3	1.0	.8	.3	.0	1.8

=== Playoffs ===
Player	POS	GP	GS	MP	REB	AST	STL	BLK	PTS	MPG	RPG	APG	SPG	BPG	PPG
Paolo Banchero	PF	7	7	273	63	44	10	5	184	39.0	9.0	6.3	1.4	.7	26.3
Desmond Bane	SG	7	7	253	33	13	13	2	127	36.1	4.7	1.9	1.9	.3	18.1
Anthony Black	PG	7	0	196	22	10	15	5	60	28.0	3.1	1.4	2.1	.7	8.6
Jamal Cain	SF	7	3	123	24	4	2	3	32	17.6	3.4	.6	.3	.4	4.6
Wendell Carter Jr.	C	7	7	237	49	20	4	12	77	33.9	7.0	2.9	.6	1.7	11.0
Tristan da Silva	SF	7	0	107	20	1	1	0	29	15.3	2.9	.1	.1	.0	4.1
Jalen Suggs	PG	7	7	248	28	29	13	4	78	35.4	4.0	4.1	1.9	.6	11.1
Goga Bitadze	C	6	0	83	24	2	2	10	17	13.8	4.0	.3	.3	1.7	2.8
Franz Wagner	SF	4	4	122	22	14	11	1	67	30.5	5.5	3.5	2.8	.3	16.8
Jevon Carter	PG	3	0	17	2	2	1	0	2	5.7	.7	.7	.3	.0	.7
Moritz Wagner	C	2	0	13	3	0	0	0	5	6.5	1.5	.0	.0	.0	2.5
Jett Howard	SF	1	0	3	0	0	0	0	0	3.0	.0	.0	.0	.0	.0
Noah Penda	SF	1	0	3	1	0	0	0	0	3.0	1.0	.0	.0	.0	.0
Jase Richardson	SG	1	0	3	0	0	0	0	6	3.0	.0	.0	.0	.0	6.0

- ^{†} Denotes player spent time with another team in the season. Stats reflect time with the Magic only.

== Transactions ==
=== Trades ===
June 15, 2025	To Orlando Magic Desmond Bane	To Memphis Grizzlies Cole Anthony; Kentavious Caldwell-Pope; 2025 ORL first-round pick (No. 16); 2026 first-round pick rights 2028 ORL first-round pick 2029 ORL protected first-round pick swap right 2030 ORL first-round pick
June 26, 2025	To Orlando Magic Draft rights to Noah Penda (No. 32)	To Boston Celtics Draft rights to Amari Williams (No. 46); Draft rights to Max Shulga (No. 57); 2026 MIL second-round pick 2027 second-round pick (Note: The most favorable of the picks originally belonging to Boston and Orlando.)
February 4, 2026	To Orlando Magic Cash considerations	To Charlotte Hornets Tyus Jones; 2027 second-round pick (Note: The least favorable of the picks originally belonging to Boston and Orlando.); 2028 ORL second-round pick

=== Free agency ===
==== Re-signed ====
Date	Player	Ref.
July 7, 2025	Moritz Wagner	

==== Additions ====
Date	Player	Former Team	Ref.
July 6, 2025	Tyus Jones	Phoenix Suns	
February 6, 2026	Jevon Carter	Chicago Bulls	

==== Subtractions ====
Player	Reason	New Team	Ref.
Gary Harris	Free agency	Milwaukee Bucks	
