= Jamal Cain =

American basketball player (born 1999)

No. 8 – Orlando Magic
- Position: Small forward
- League: NBA

Personal information
- Born: March 20, 1999 (age 27) Pontiac, Michigan, U.S.
- Listed height: 6 ft 7 in (2.01 m)
- Listed weight: 207 lb (94 kg)

Career information
- High school: Academy for Business and Technology (Melvindale, Michigan); Cornerstone Health and Technology (Detroit, Michigan)
- College: Marquette (2017–2021); Oakland (2021–2022)
- NBA draft: 2022: undrafted
- Playing career: 2022–present

Career history
- 2022–2024: Miami Heat
- 2022–2024: →Sioux Falls Skyforce
- 2024–2025: New Orleans Pelicans
- 2025–present: Orlando Magic
- 2025–2026: →Osceola Magic

Career highlights
- Horizon League co-Player of the Year (2022); First-team All-Horizon League (2022)
- Stats at NBA.com
- Stats at Basketball Reference

Hasen Jamal Cain (born March 20, 1999) is an American professional basketball player for the Orlando Magic of the National Basketball Association (NBA). He played college basketball for the Marquette Golden Eagles and the Oakland Golden Grizzlies.

== High school career ==
Cain attended the Academy for Business and Technology in Melvindale, Michigan before transferring to Cornerstone Health and Technology in Detroit, Michigan. As a senior, Cain was rated as the second best player in Michigan by the Detroit Free Press. He was named a finalist for the Mr. Basketball of Michigan. Cain was a four-star recruit and committed to playing college basketball for Marquette.

== College career ==
Cain attended Marquette University for his first four years. He averaged 9.6 points and 6.3 rebounds per game as a senior. For his final season of eligibility, Cain transferred to Oakland University and played for Greg Kampe and the Oakland Golden Grizzlies as a graduate transfer. He averaged 19.9 points, 10.2 rebounds, and 1.8 steals per game while shooting 49.9 percent from the floor and 84.1 percent from the foul line. He was named the Horizon League Co-Player of the Year.

== Professional career ==
=== Miami Heat / Sioux Falls Skyforce (2022–2024) ===
After going undrafted in the 2022 NBA draft, Cain signed a summer league contract with the Miami Heat. He signed a deal with the Heat on July 15, 2022. On October 9, Cain's contract was converted into a two-way contract, allowing him to play with the Heat and its NBA G League affiliate, the Sioux Falls Skyforce. On November 12, Cain made his NBA debut in a 132–115 win over the Charlotte Hornets. Cain made the 2023 NBA Finals where the Heat would go to lose in five games to the Denver Nuggets. He made 18 total appearances for Miami during his rookie season, averaging 5.4 points, 2.9 rebounds, and 0.7 assists.

On August 11, 2023, Cain signed another two-way contract with the Heat. Cain made 26 appearances (including one start) for Miami during the 2023–24 NBA season, recording averages of 3.7 points, 1.4 rebounds, and 0.4 assists.

=== New Orleans Pelicans / Birmingham Squadron (2024–2025) ===
On July 14, 2024, Cain signed a two-way contract with the New Orleans Pelicans. Cain made 37 appearances for New Orleans during the 2024–25 season, posting averages of 5.3 points, 2.3 rebounds, and 0.6 assists.

=== Orlando / Osceola Magic (2025–present) ===
On July 25, 2025, Cain signed a two-way contract with the Orlando Magic. On March 20, 2026, Cain's contract was converted to a two-year standard deal with a team option for the second year. He made 40 appearances (including one start) for the Magic during the regular season, recording averages of 5.4 points, 2.0 rebounds, and 0.7 assists. On April 29, Cain started his first career playoff game against the Detroit Pistons after Franz Wagner was ruled out due to injury. In the game, he recorded five points, four rebounds, and one assist as Orlando lost, 116–109.

== Career statistics ==
Legend
GP	Games played	GS	Games started	MPG	Minutes per game
FG%	Field goal percentage	3P%	3-point field goal percentage	FT%	Free throw percentage
RPG	Rebounds per game	APG	Assists per game	SPG	Steals per game
BPG	Blocks per game	PPG	Points per game	**Bold**	Career high

=== NBA ===
==== Regular season ====
Year	Team	GP	GS	MPG	FG%	3P%	FT%	RPG	APG	SPG	BPG	PPG
2022–23	Miami	18	0	13.3	**.561**	.350	.773	**2.9**	**.7**	**.6**	.1	**5.4**
2023–24	Miami	26	**1**	10.0	.430	.355	.783	1.4	.4	.4	**.2**	3.7
2024–25	New Orleans	37	0	**13.6**	.430	.325	.680	2.3	.6	.6	**.2**	5.3
2025–26	Orlando	**40**	**1**	12.2	.487	**.384**	**.848**	2.0	**.7**	.3	.1	**5.4**
Career		121	2	12.3	.468	.353	.766	2.1	.6	.5	.2	5.0

==== Playoffs ====
Year	Team	GP	GS	MPG	FG%	3P%	FT%	RPG	APG	SPG	BPG	PPG
2026	Orlando	7	3	17.6	.414	.250	.455	3.4	.6	.3	.4	4.6
Career		7	3	17.6	.414	.250	.455	3.4	.6	.3	.4	4.6
