= Frank Wagner =

Frank Wagner may refer to:

- Frank Wagner (American politician) (born 1955), American politician in Virginia
- Frank Wagner (German politician) (born 1977), German politician
- Frank D. Wagner (lawyer) (1945–2016), American lawyer and Reporter of Decisions of the United States Supreme Court
- Frank D. Wagner (admiral) (1893–1966), United States Navy admiral

== See also ==
- Frank Wagener (born 1952), chairman of the Luxembourg Stock Exchange
