= Franz Xaver Wagner =

German comedian and author

Franz Xaver Wagner (May 1, 1939 – August 8, 2011) was a German comedian and author.

== Life ==
Wagner worked as a comedian and author in Germany. He wrote several books.

== Works ==
- Alpines Panoptikum. Rother, München 1978, ISBN 3-7633-8010-8.
- Alpines Alphabet. Rother, München 1980, ISBN 3-7633-6053-0.
- Franz Xaver Wagners Bergtagebuch. Rother, München 1985, ISBN 3-7633-6068-9.
- Tiefengrabers Erzählungen. wt-BuchTeam, Garching/Alz 2002, ISBN 3-936599-30-0.
