= Jase Richardson =

American basketball player (born 2005)

No. 11 – Orlando Magic
- Position: Shooting guard
- League: NBA

Personal information
- Born: October 16, 2005 (age 21) Berkeley, California, U.S.
- Listed height: 6 ft 2 in (1.88 m)
- Listed weight: 185 lb (84 kg)

Career information
- High school: Bishop Gorman (Las Vegas, Nevada); Christopher Columbus (Westchester, Florida)
- College: Michigan State (2024–2025)
- NBA draft: 2025: 1st round, 25th overall pick
- Drafted by: Orlando Magic
- Playing career: 2025–present

Career history
- 2025–present: Orlando Magic
- 2026: →Osceola Magic

Career highlights
- Third-team All-Big Ten (2025); Big Ten All-Freshman Team (2025); Jordan Brand Classic (2024)
- Stats at NBA.com
- Stats at Basketball Reference

Jason Anthoney Richardson II (born October 16, 2005) is an American professional basketball player for the Orlando Magic of the National Basketball Association (NBA). He played college basketball for the Michigan State Spartans.

== Early life and high school career ==
Richardson was born in Berkeley, California and grew up in Denver, Colorado. Before the start of his freshman year of high school his family moved to Las Vegas, Nevada where he attended Bishop Gorman High School. Richardson averaged 14 points, five rebounds, five assists and two steals per game as a sophomore. After missing most of his junior year, Richardson finished his Nike EYBL career as the third-leading scorer (20.1 PPG) and an unprecedented 10-to-1 assist-to-turnover ratio making him most efficient point guard regardless of circuit and earning first team Peach Jam Honors. Richardson transferred to Christopher Columbus High School in Westchester, Florida before the start of his senior season where he averaged 15 points, six rebounds and four assists helping lead Christopher Columbus to their third straight FHSAA 7A State Championship and a final four appearance at Chipotle Nationals alongside Cameron Boozer. He was rated a four-star recruit and committed to playing college basketball for Michigan State, where his father played, over offers from Alabama and Cincinnati.

== College career ==
Richardson enrolled at Michigan State University in June 2024 in order to take part in the Spartans' summer practices. He made his college basketball debut during Michigan State's season-opener against Monmouth on November 4, 2024, and registered 10 points with two rebounds and four assists in an 81–57 win. Richardson came off the bench for most to the season before earning his first career start on February 8, 2025 against Oregon, in which he scored a career-high 29 points in the win over the Ducks. Richardson started for the remainder of the season and led the Spartans to the Big Ten conference regular-season championship and an Elite Eight appearance in the NCAA tournament where he was selected to the 2025 South Regional Team.

Richardson was named to the Big Ten All-Freshman team and All-Big Ten third team.

Richardson announced the end of his college career on April 8, 2025, when he officially made his declaration for the 2025 NBA draft, forgoing his remaining college eligibility.

== Professional career ==
=== Orlando Magic (2025-present) ===
Richardson was selected in the first round with the 25th overall pick by the Orlando Magic in the 2025 NBA draft.

== Career statistics ==
Legend
GP	Games played	GS	Games started	MPG	Minutes per game
FG%	Field goal percentage	3P%	3-point field goal percentage	FT%	Free throw percentage
RPG	Rebounds per game	APG	Assists per game	SPG	Steals per game
BPG	Blocks per game	PPG	Points per game	**Bold**	Career high

=== NBA ===
==== Regular season ====
Year	Team	GP	GS	MPG	FG%	3P%	FT%	RPG	APG	SPG	BPG	PPG
2025–26	Orlando	54	0	10.9	.473	.354	.717	1.2	1.1	.4	.0	4.4
Career		54	0	10.9	.473	.354	.717	1.2	1.1	.4	.0	4.4

==== Playoffs ====
Year	Team	GP	GS	MPG	FG%	3P%	FT%	RPG	APG	SPG	BPG	PPG
2026	Orlando	1	0	3.0	1.000	1.000	—	.0	.0	.0	.0	6.0
Career		1	0	3.0	1.000	1.000	—	.0	.0	.0	.0	6.0

=== College ===
Year	Team	GP	GS	MPG	FG%	3P%	FT%	RPG	APG	SPG	BPG	PPG
2024–25	Michigan State	36	15	25.3	.493	.412	.836	3.3	1.9	.8	.3	12.1

== Personal life ==
Richardson's father, Jason Richardson, was a second-team All-American at Michigan State and a member of the Spartans' 2000 national championship team and played in the National Basketball Association for 14 seasons. From age four through high school, Jase was coached by his mother, Jackie Paul-Richardson, who played basketball at the University of Colorado, Colorado Springs. Richardson's younger brother Jaxon is a consensus five-star basketball recruit in the class of 2026.
