= Noah Penda =

French basketball player (born 2005)

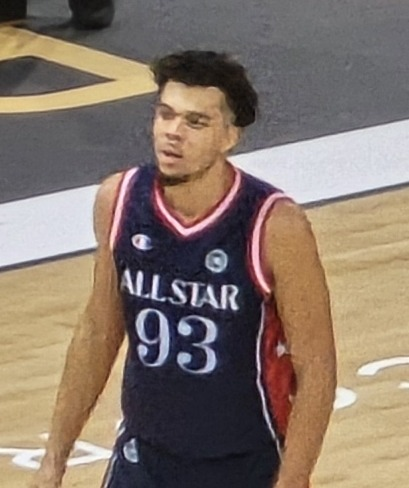
- Penda in the LNB All-Star Game in 2025

No. 93 – Orlando Magic
- Position: Forward
- League: NBA

Personal information
- Born: 7 January 2005 (age 21) Paris, France
- Listed height: 6 ft 7 in (2.01 m)
- Listed weight: 242 lb (110 kg)

Career information
- NBA draft: 2025: 2nd round, 32nd overall pick
- Drafted by: Boston Celtics
- Playing career: 2022–present

Career history
- 2022–2024: JA Vichy-Clermont
- 2024–2025: Le Mans Sarthe
- 2025–present: Orlando Magic
- 2025–2026: →Osceola Magic

Career highlights
- LNB Pro A Best Young Player (2025); LNB All-Star (2025)
- Stats at NBA.com
- Stats at Basketball Reference
Medals
Men's basketball
Representing France
FIBA U17 World Cup
Bronze medal – third place	2022 Spain	Team

Noah Penda (born 7 January 2005) is a French professional basketball player for the Orlando Magic of the National Basketball Association (NBA). He previously played for JA Vichy-Clermont.

== Early life ==
Penda was born on 7 January 2005. He was born in Paris and grew up in Bondy. He played several sports when young, including football, judo, swimming and tennis, before trying out basketball. He started playing basketball as a youth for the club BC Fontenay. He later was a member of the clubs Villemomble and Levallois. He averaged 19.5 points in 11 games for the Levallois U15 squad in the 2019–20 season before joining Centre Fédéral de Basket-ball for the following season. He played 13 games for Centre in the Nationale Masculine 1, the third-tier of French basketball, during the 2020–21 season, averaging 2.9 points. He remained with the team for the following season and averaged 10.6 points.

== Professional career ==
=== JA Vichy-Clermont ===
In June 2022, Penda signed a professional contract with JA Vichy-Clermont in the LNB Pro B, the second-tier of French basketball. He appeared in 37 games during the 2022–23 season, averaging 3.9 points. The following season, he appeared in 37 games again and average 9.5 points and 5.9 rebounds, being selected second-team All-LNB Pro B by Eurobasket.com and the league's best young player.

=== Le Mans Sarthe ===
Penda signed with Le Mans Sarthe Basket, in the LNB Élite, France's top-tier, in June 2024. He began seeing significant playing time as a starter despite being only 19 years old in his first season with the team. He was an LNB All-Star and participated in the league's Young Star Game in January, where he was named most valuable player. Following his breakout year, Penda was named the LNB Pro A Best Young Player, after averaging 10.3 points, 5.3 rebounds and 2.8 assists over the season.

=== Orlando Magic ===
Penda was viewed as a potential prospect ahead of the 2025 NBA draft. The Orlando Magic traded for his draft rights from the Boston Celtics and he was selected with the 32nd pick.

== National team career ==
Penda competed for France at the 2022 FIBA Under-17 Basketball World Cup, averaging 7.5 points in six games played. He later participated in the 2023 FIBA Under-19 Basketball World Cup, helping France place second. He represented France at the 2024 FIBA U20 EuroBasket tournament, where he averaged 11.7 points in seven games and won the championship. In the quarterfinals of the tournament, with France down by one point against Spain, he made a game-winning buzzer beater shot to win 74–72.

== Career statistics ==
Legend
GP	Games played	GS	Games started	MPG	Minutes per game
FG%	Field goal percentage	3P%	3-point field goal percentage	FT%	Free throw percentage
RPG	Rebounds per game	APG	Assists per game	SPG	Steals per game
BPG	Blocks per game	PPG	Points per game	**Bold**	Career high

=== NBA ===
==== Regular season ====
Year	Team	GP	GS	MPG	FG%	3P%	FT%	RPG	APG	SPG	BPG	PPG
2025–26	Orlando	59	2	12.8	.404	.323	.688	3.2	1.2	.5	.3	3.8
Career		59	2	12.8	.404	.323	.688	3.2	1.2	.5	.3	3.8

==== Playoffs ====
Year	Team	GP	GS	MPG	FG%	3P%	FT%	RPG	APG	SPG	BPG	PPG
2026	Orlando	1	0	3.0	—	—	—	1.0	.0	.0	.0	.0
Career		1	0	3.0	—	—	—	1.0	.0	.0	.0	.0
