= Moritz Wagner (basketball) =

German basketball player (born 1997)

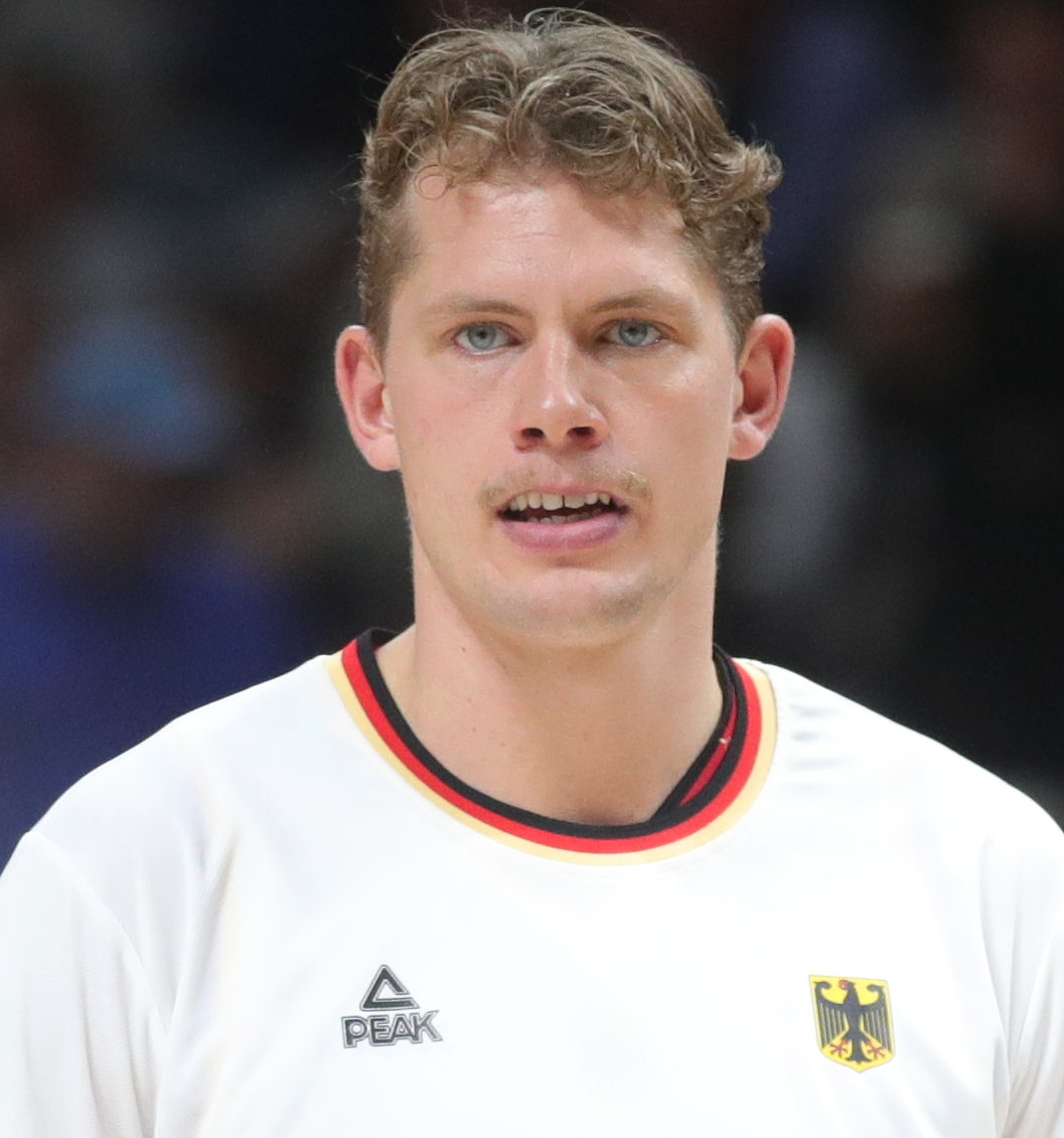
- Wagner with Germany in 2023

No. 13 – Brooklyn Nets
- Position: Center
- League: NBA

Personal information
- Born: 26 April 1997 (age 29) Berlin, Germany
- Listed height: 6 ft 11 in (2.11 m)
- Listed weight: 255 lb (116 kg)

Career information
- College: Michigan (2015–2018)
- NBA draft: 2018: 1st round, 25th overall pick
- Drafted by: Los Angeles Lakers
- Playing career: 2014–2015; 2018–present

Career history
- 2014–2015: Alba Berlin
- 2018–2019: Los Angeles Lakers
- 2018: →South Bay Lakers
- 2019–2021: Washington Wizards
- 2021: Boston Celtics
- 2021–2026: Orlando Magic
- 2026–present: Brooklyn Nets

Career highlights
- Second-team All-Big Ten (2018); Big Ten tournament MVP (2018)
- Stats at NBA.com
- Stats at Basketball Reference
Medals
Men's basketball
Representing Germany
FIBA World Cup
Gold medal – first place	2023 Philippines•Japan•Indonesia	Team
FIBA Europe U18 Championship
Gold medal – first place	2014 Bulgaria	Team

Victor Moritz "Moe" Wagner (born 26 April 1997) is a German basketball player for the Brooklyn Nets of the National Basketball Association (NBA). He was a member of Alba Berlin before playing college basketball for the Michigan Wolverines. Wagner was selected with the 25th overall pick in the 2018 NBA draft by the Los Angeles Lakers. He has also played for the Washington Wizards, Boston Celtics and Orlando Magic.

In 2018, Wagner was an All-Big Ten selection and the Big Ten Tournament MVP. He was also named to the West Region All-Tournament Team and Final Four All-Tournament Team during the 2018 NCAA tournament. Wagner has represented the German national team. He is the older brother of NBA player, Franz Wagner.

== Early career ==
Wagner started his basketball career in the youth ranks of Alba Berlin. In 2013–14, Wagner played for the club's under-19 Bundesliga squad, which won the German championship. In 2014–15, he played on Alba Berlin's Bundesliga roster, appearing in four games of the German league, scoring 2.3 points per contest. He also played in two Euroleague games during the 2014–15 season.

== College career ==
Wagner first came to the attention of University of Michigan head coach John Beilein in 2014 through an email from a former coaching acquaintance in Germany. Wagner also used social contacts to forward a self-made highlight video to Beilein. Ultimately, Beilein flew to Berlin to recruit Wagner. In April 2015, Wagner announced his decision to attend the University of Michigan and play for the Michigan Wolverines. By opting to go to college, he turned down an offer to play professionally.

=== Freshman season ===
On March 16, 2016, in the First Four round of the 2016 NCAA Division I men's basketball tournament, Michigan defeated Tulsa, 67–62. After blocking two shots all season, Wagner posted four blocks and had a season-high eight rebounds against Tulsa.

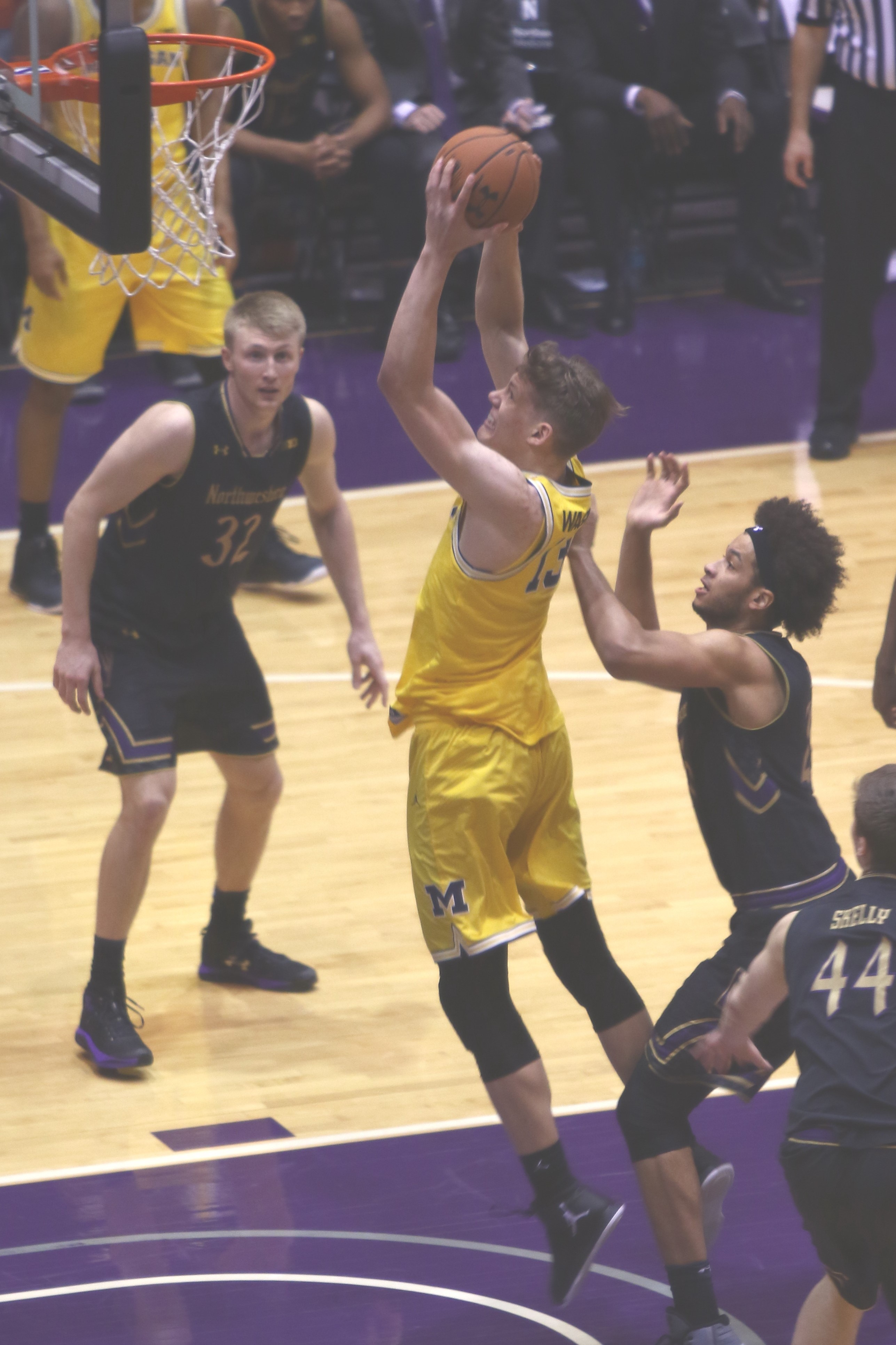
Wagner in the paint for the 2016–17 Michigan Wolverines

=== Sophomore season ===
Wagner's five steals in the March 9, 2017 Big Ten Conference men's basketball tournament opener against Illinois was a single-game high for the tournament. Three days later, Michigan won its first Big Ten tournament championship since 1998. On March 19, Wagner's career-high 26 points helped Michigan defeat Louisville 73–69 to advance to the Sweet 16 of the 2017 NCAA Division I men's basketball tournament. For the season, Wagner started all 38 games and averaged 12.1 points and 4.2 rebounds per game, while shooting 39.5% on three-pointers. He finished the season as the team's leading rebounder. Following the season, he was an honorable mention All-Big Ten selection by both the coaches and the media.

On April 10, 2017, both Wagner and teammate D. J. Wilson declared for the 2017 NBA draft, but did not hire agents, which gave them until May 24 to withdraw their names and retain their athletic eligibility to return to Michigan. Declaring early enabled him to participate in workouts with NBA teams and made him eligible for an invitation to the May 9–14 NBA Draft Combine. On April 30, 2017, Jeff Goodman of ESPN reported that he was invited to the NBA Draft Combine. On May 24, 2017, Wagner decided to pull out of the 2017 draft and return to Michigan for the 2017–18 season.

=== Junior season ===
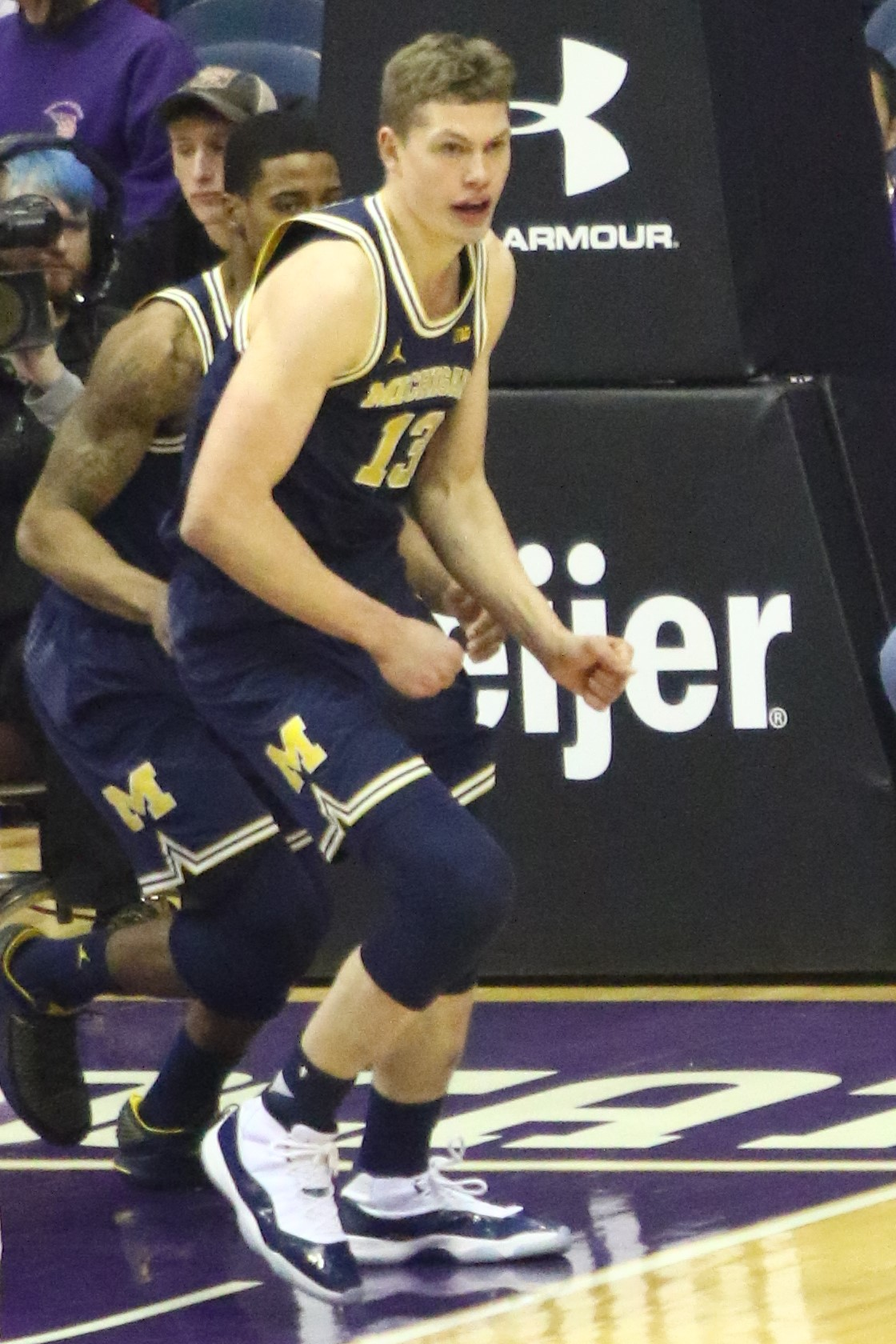
Wagner for the 2017–18 Michigan Wolverines

Wagner was selected to the 2017 10-man preseason All-Big Ten team. He was also one of two Big Ten players named to the 21-man Karl Malone Award watch list. He was a preseason John R. Wooden Award and Naismith College Player of the Year watchlist honoree.

On January 13, 2018, Wagner scored a career-high 27 points as Michigan defeated the fourth-ranked Michigan State Spartans 82–72 in East Lansing; Wagner shot 8-for-13 from the field, including 3-for-4 from three-point range and 8-for-8 from the free-throw line. Following the 2017–18 Big Ten Conference men's basketball regular season, Wagner had accumulated more three-point field goals (47) than any NCAA player 6 ft 11 in (2.11 m) or taller and was a second team All-Big Ten selection by the coaches and the media.

On March 2, Michigan defeated Nebraska 77–58 in the quarterfinals of the 2018 Big Ten Conference men's basketball tournament. Wagner recorded his seventh double-double of the season with 20 points and 13 rebounds. His 13 rebounds marked a single-game high for the 2018 tournament through the first two rounds. The following day, in the semifinals of the Big Ten tournament Wagner scored his 1,000th career point, becoming the 54th Wolverine to reach the milestone. He finished the game with a team-high 15 points and eight rebounds in a 75–64 victory over the second-ranked Michigan State Spartans. In the March 4, 2018 Big Ten tournament championship game against Purdue, Wagner scored 17 points to help lead Michigan to their second consecutive Big Ten tournament championship. Wagner was named the tournament's Most Outstanding Player. In the 2018 tournament, Wagner averaged 15.8 points and 6.5 rebounds per game.

Wagner, who averaged 12.5 points and 5.5 rebounds in the first four games of the 2018 NCAA basketball tournament, was joined by Wolverines teammates Matthews and Muhammad-Ali Abdur-Rahkman on the West Region All-tournament team. Having reached the Final Four, Michigan defeated Loyola–Chicago 69–57 in the national semifinals on March 31. Wagner recorded his eighth double-double of the season with a game-high 24 points and a career-high 15 rebounds. Wagner became the first player with at least 20 points and 15 rebounds in a national semifinal game since Hakeem Olajuwon in 1983. On April 2, Michigan lost to (#2 Coaches Poll/#2 AP Poll) Villanova 62–79 in the National Championship Game. Wagner recorded 16 points and seven rebounds, and was named to the Final Four All-Tournament Team. For the tournament he averaged 15.0 points, 7.3 rebounds, 1.3 assists, and 1.2 steals, while shooting 38.5% on his three-point shots.

For the season, Wagner averaged 14.6 points and 7.1 rebounds and shot 52.8% overall and a team-best 39.4% on his three-point shots. On March 21, Wagner became an Academic All-Big Ten honoree. On April 14, 2018, Wagner announced that he would enter the 2018 NBA draft and hire an agent. On May 1, Wagner signed with Roc Nation's Joe Branch, who has represented former Michigan teammate Caris LeVert. Later that day, he received an invitation to the NBA draft combine.

== Professional career ==
=== Los Angeles Lakers (2018–2019) ===
On June 21, 2018, Wagner was selected with the 25th overall pick in the 2018 NBA draft by the Los Angeles Lakers. On July 1, he signed his rookie scale contract with the Lakers. On July 10, Wagner injured both his left knee and left ankle in the Las Vegas Summer League. He was sidelined for all of training camp and the preseason by the knee injury. Wagner was assigned to the G League South Bay Lakers on rehab assignment on October 26. Wagner made his G-League debut for the South Bay Lakers on November 3, scoring 17 points in 29 minutes in a 108–106 loss to the Stockton Kings. He made his NBA debut on November 17 against the Orlando Magic. On December 2, in a 120–96 victory against the Phoenix Suns, Wagner scored his first NBA points (a pair of free throws) and finished the game with 10 points. On March 9, 2019, Wagner scored a season-high 22 points with six rebounds, three assists and a block in his first career start in a 107–120 loss to the Boston Celtics.

=== Washington Wizards (2019–2021) ===
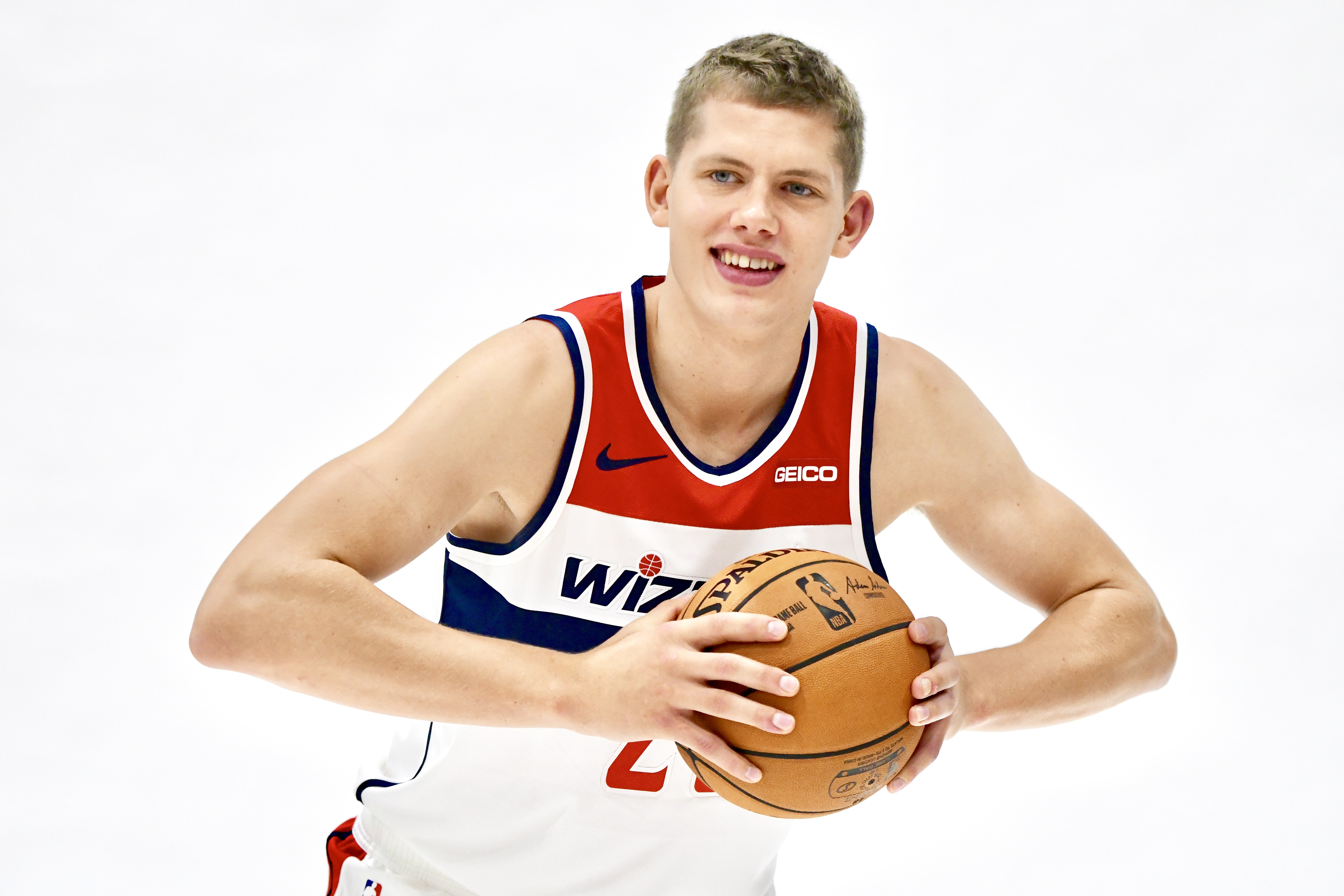
Wagner in 2019

On July 6, 2019, Wagner was traded to the Washington Wizards, along with Isaac Bonga, Jemerrio Jones, and a 2022 second-round pick, in a three-team trade where the Lakers acquired Anthony Davis. On November 15, playing against the Minnesota Timberwolves, Wagner became the first NBA player to score 30 points and obtain 15 rebounds coming off the bench since Yao Ming in 2002 and the first to post such numbers in under 26 minutes played in since Len Chappell in 1967. Wagner also drew three charges in the game and was the first NBA player to ever post 30 points and 15 rebounds (both career highs) with 4 three-point shots off the bench. Wagner missed 24 games with an ankle sprain before returning to the lineup on February 3 against the Golden State Warriors. He was named to the Rising Stars Challenge at the 2020 NBA All-Star Weekend, where he scored 16 points for the world team.

=== Boston Celtics (2021) ===
On March 25, 2021, Wagner was traded to the Boston Celtics in a three-team trade involving the Chicago Bulls. On March 26, Wagner made his debut for the Celtics in a 122–114 win over the Milwaukee Bucks, finishing with three points and five rebounds across 10 minutes of play. On April 16, he was waived by the Celtics.

=== Orlando Magic (2021–2026) ===
Wagner signed with the Orlando Magic for the rest of the 2020-21 NBA season on April 27, 2021. On April 28, he debuted for the Magic against the Cleveland Cavaliers, Wagner scored two points, grabbed two rebounds and dished out an assist across nine minutes in a 109–104 win. On May 1, he logged a season-high 24 points in his third game with the Magic. Wagner knocked down a 3-pointer that tied the game at 109 with 1 minute and 16 seconds left to play, contributing to the Magic's 112–111 win over the Memphis Grizzlies. On August 23, he re-signed with Orlando.

On December 29, 2022, Wagner was suspended by the NBA for two games without pay due to an altercation with Detroit Pistons guard Killian Hayes the day before.

On July 6, 2023, Wagner signed a two-year, $16 million deal to return to the Orlando Magic. He made 80 appearances (one start) for Orlando during the 2023–24 NBA season, averaging 10.9 points, 4.3 rebounds, and 1.2 assists. On July 6, 2024, Wagner re-signed on a two-year, $22 million contract. In 2024, Wagner's nickname preferences was clarified as "Moe" not "Mo", despite longstanding use of the latter by much of the press.

On December 21, 2024, Wagner suffered a season–ending ACL tear in left knee while playing against the Miami Heat. His diagnosis was announced the following day, along with news of an imminent surgery to correct the injury. Wagner had once again operated as a back up prior to his injury, averaging 12.9 points, 4.9 rebounds, and 1.4 assists over 30 appearances (one start).

On July 4, 2025, Wagner re-signed with the Magic on a one-year, $5 million contract. On January 11, 2026, Wagner made his first appearance since the ACL injury, recording eight points in 10 minutes played during a 128–118 victory over the New Orleans Pelicans.

=== Brooklyn Nets (2026–present) ===
On July 31, 2026, Wagner signed a two-year, $19 million contract with the Brooklyn Nets. On October 21, he made his Nets debut, scoring seven points in a 110–103 loss to the Charlotte Hornets.

== National team career ==
=== Junior national team ===
Wagner won gold with the Germany U18 national team at the 2014 FIBA Europe Under-18 Championship Division B in Bulgaria. Averaging 16.1 points per contest, Wagner was Germany's leading scorer at the 2017 FIBA Europe Under-20 Championship.

=== Senior national team ===
Wagner helped Germany qualify for the 2020 Summer Olympics, where he earned the MVP award in the Olympic qualifying tournament in Split, Croatia. During the event in Tokyo, he averaged 11 points per game. A few years later, in September 2023, Wagner helped Germany win their first world title at the 2023 FIBA World Cup. He finished with averages of 11.9 points and 4.8 rebounds per game.

== Career statistics ==
Legend
GP	Games played	GS	Games started	MPG	Minutes per game
FG%	Field goal percentage	3P%	3-point field goal percentage	FT%	Free throw percentage
RPG	Rebounds per game	APG	Assists per game	SPG	Steals per game
BPG	Blocks per game	PPG	Points per game	**Bold**	Career high

=== NBA ===
==== Regular season ====
Year	Team	GP	GS	MPG	FG%	3P%	FT%	RPG	APG	SPG	BPG	PPG
2018–19	L.A. Lakers	43	5	10.4	.415	.286	.811	2.0	.6	.3	.3	4.8
2019–20	Washington	45	5	18.6	.545	.313	.821	**4.9**	1.2	.6	.4	8.7
2020–21	Washington	25	13	15.0	.508	.310	.788	2.9	1.3	**.9**	.3	7.1
2020–21	Boston	9	1	6.8	.286	.333	.500	2.1	.7	.0	.1	1.2
2020–21	Orlando	11	10	**26.0**	.409	**.372**	**.879**	**4.9**	1.1	.4	**.8**	11.0
2021–22	Orlando	63	3	15.2	.497	.328	.806	3.7	1.4	.3	.2	9.0
2022–23	Orlando	57	**18**	19.5	.500	.313	.841	4.5	**1.5**	.6	.2	10.5
2023–24	Orlando	**80**	1	17.7	**.601**	.330	.814	4.3	1.2	.5	.3	10.9
2024–25	Orlando	30	1	18.8	.562	.360	.718	**4.9**	1.4	.8	.4	**12.9**
2025–26	Orlando	36	0	11.9	.426	.314	.819	3.2	.8	.4	.1	6.9
Career		399	57	16.2	.518	.323	.808	3.9	1.2	.5	.3	9.0

==== Playoffs ====
Year	Team	GP	GS	MPG	FG%	3P%	FT%	RPG	APG	SPG	BPG	PPG
2024	Orlando	**7**	0	**15.0**	**.444**	.222	.588	**4.4**	**.3**	**.9**	**.4**	**6.3**
2026	Orlando	2	0	6.5	.250	**1.000**	**1.000**	1.5	.0	.0	.0	2.5
Career		9	0	13.1	.425	.300	.632	3.8	.2	.7	.3	5.4

=== College ===
Year	Team	GP	GS	MPG	FG%	3P%	FT%	RPG	APG	SPG	BPG	PPG
2015–16	Michigan	30	0	8.6	**.607**	.167	.556	1.6	.1	.2	.2	2.9
2016–17	Michigan	38	38	23.9	.560	**.395**	**.726**	4.2	.5	**1.0**	.4	12.1
2017–18	Michigan	**39**	**39**	**27.6**	.528	.394	.694	**7.1**	**.8**	**1.0**	**.5**	**14.6**
Career		107	77	21.0	.547	.385	.698	4.5	.5	.8	.4	10.4

== Personal life ==
Wagner has a younger brother, Franz, who is his former teammate on the Orlando Magic and played basketball for Michigan.

Wagner is a fan of the Bundesliga football club Werder Bremen.

Moritz had a small role in the 2022 sports drama Hustle.
