= Frank Wagner (German politician) =

German politician (born 1977)

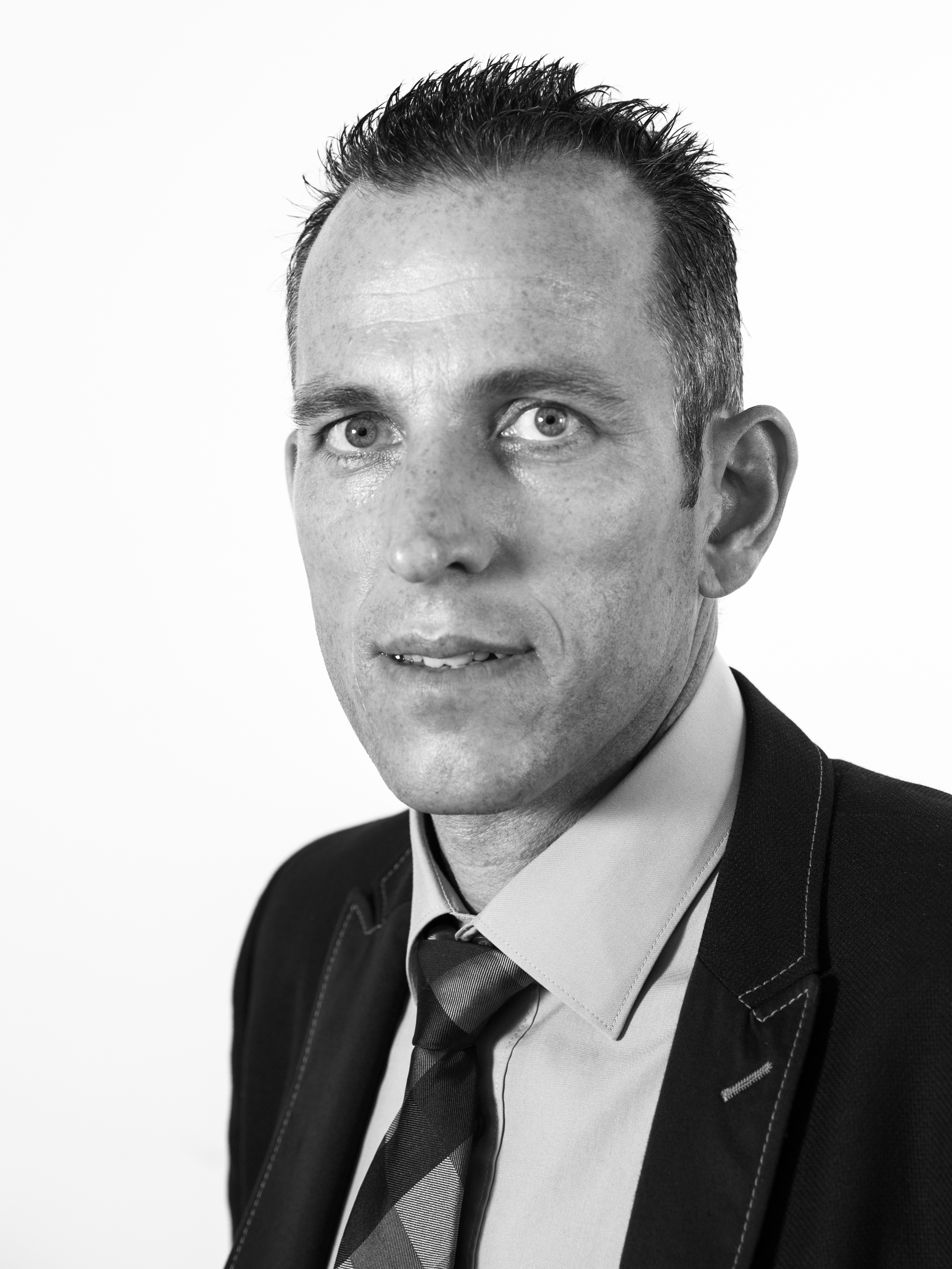
- Wagner in 2017

Member of the Landtag of Saarland
- Incumbent
- Assumed office 24 May 2017
- Preceded by: Monika Bachmann
- Constituency: Saarlouis

Personal details
- Born: 1977 (age 48–49)
- Party: Christian Democratic Union (since 1993)

Frank Wagner (born 1977) is a German politician serving as a member of the Landtag of Saarland since 2017. He has served as secretary general of the Christian Democratic Union in Saarland since 2022.
