= Franz Wagner =

German basketball player (born 2001)

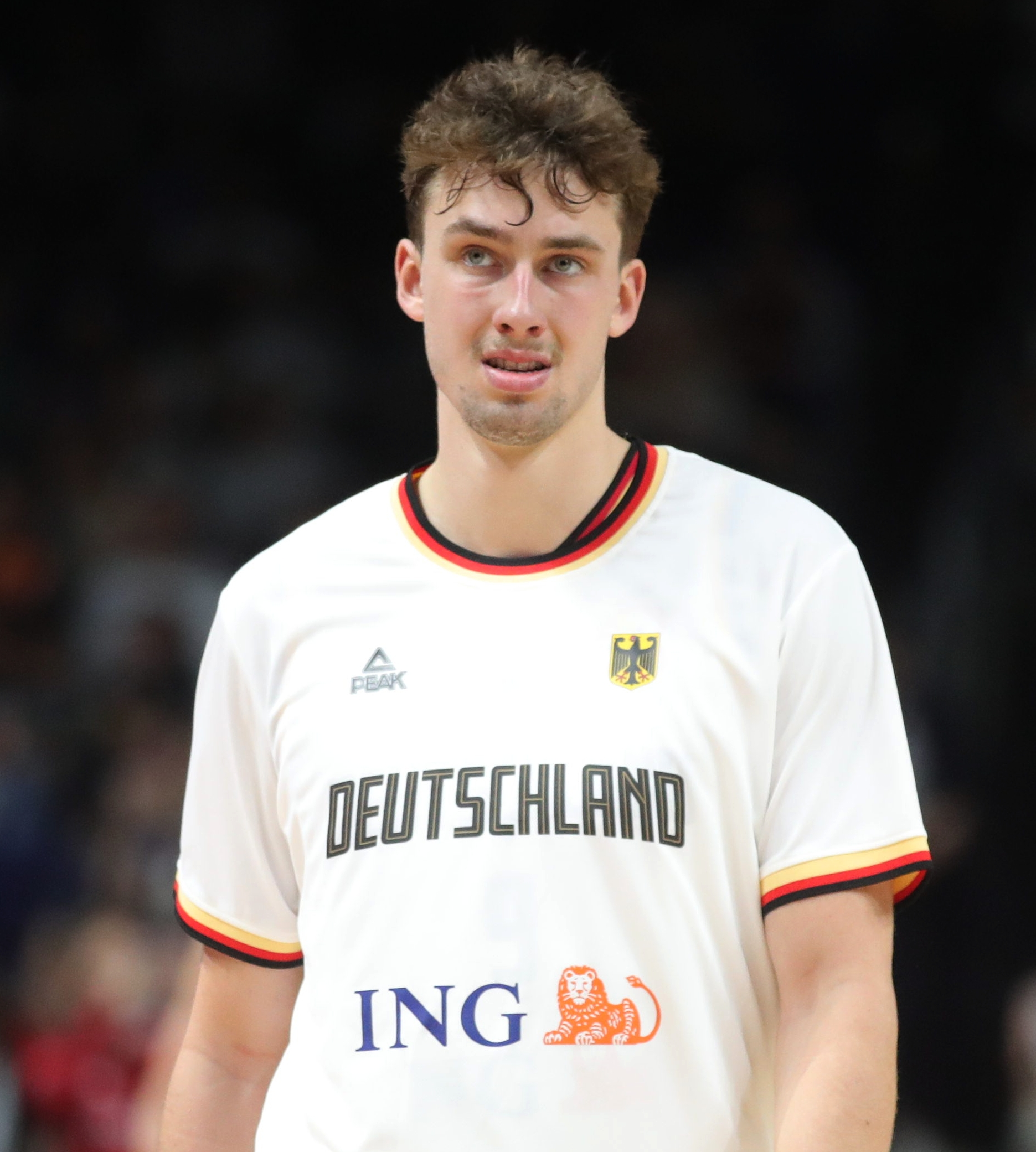
- Wagner with Germany in 2023

No. 22 – Orlando Magic
- Position: Small forward
- League: NBA

Personal information
- Born: 27 August 2001 (age 25) Berlin, Germany
- Listed height: 6 ft 10 in (2.08 m)
- Listed weight: 230 lb (104 kg)

Career information
- College: Michigan (2019–2021)
- NBA draft: 2021: 1st round, 8th overall pick
- Drafted by: Orlando Magic
- Playing career: 2017–2019; 2021–present

Career history
- 2017–2019: Alba Berlin
- 2018–2019: →SSV Lokomotive Bernau
- 2021–present: Orlando Magic

Career highlights
- NBA All-Rookie First Team (2022); Bundesliga Best German Young Player (2019); Second-team All-Big Ten – Coaches (2021); Third-team All-Big Ten – Media (2021); First-team Academic All-American (2021); Big Ten All-Freshman Team (2020)
- Stats at NBA.com
- Stats at Basketball Reference
Medals
Men's basketball
Representing Germany
FIBA World Cup
Gold medal – first place	2023 Philippines–Japan–Indonesia
EuroBasket
Gold medal – first place	2025 Cyprus–Finland–Poland–Latvia
Bronze medal – third place	2022 Czech Republic–Georgia–Italy–Germany

Franz Jacob Wagner (born 27 August 2001) is a German professional basketball player for the Orlando Magic of the National Basketball Association (NBA). He played college basketball for the Michigan Wolverines.

Wagner, a native of Berlin, started his career with Basketball Bundesliga (BBL) club Alba Berlin. In 2019, he was named BBL Best German Young Player. Wagner has played for the German youth national teams, winning a gold medal at the 2018 Albert Schweitzer Tournament.

His older brother Moritz Wagner, a former Michigan standout, plays for the Brooklyn Nets.

== Recruiting ==
Wagner was considered a four-star recruit by 247Sports and Rivals. Among the NCAA Division I programs that recruited him were Butler, Michigan and Stanford. On July 6, 2019, Wagner committed to play college basketball for Michigan under head coach Juwan Howard. In doing so, he turned down an opportunity to sign a professional contract with Alba Berlin.

College recruiting
Name	Hometown	School	Height	Weight	Commit date
Franz Wagner; SF	Berlin, Germany	Alba Berlin	6 ft 7 in (2.01 m)	190 lb (86 kg)	Jul 6, 2019
Franz Wagner; SF	Recruit ratings: Rivals: 247Sports:				
Overall recruit ranking: 247Sports: 43
Note: In many cases, Scout, Rivals, 247Sports, On3, and ESPN may conflict in their listings of height and weight.; In these cases, the average was taken. ESPN grades are on a 100-point scale.; Sources: "Michigan 2019 Basketball Commitments". Rivals.; "2019 Michigan Wolverines Recruiting Class". ESPN.; "2019 Team Ranking". Rivals.

== College career ==
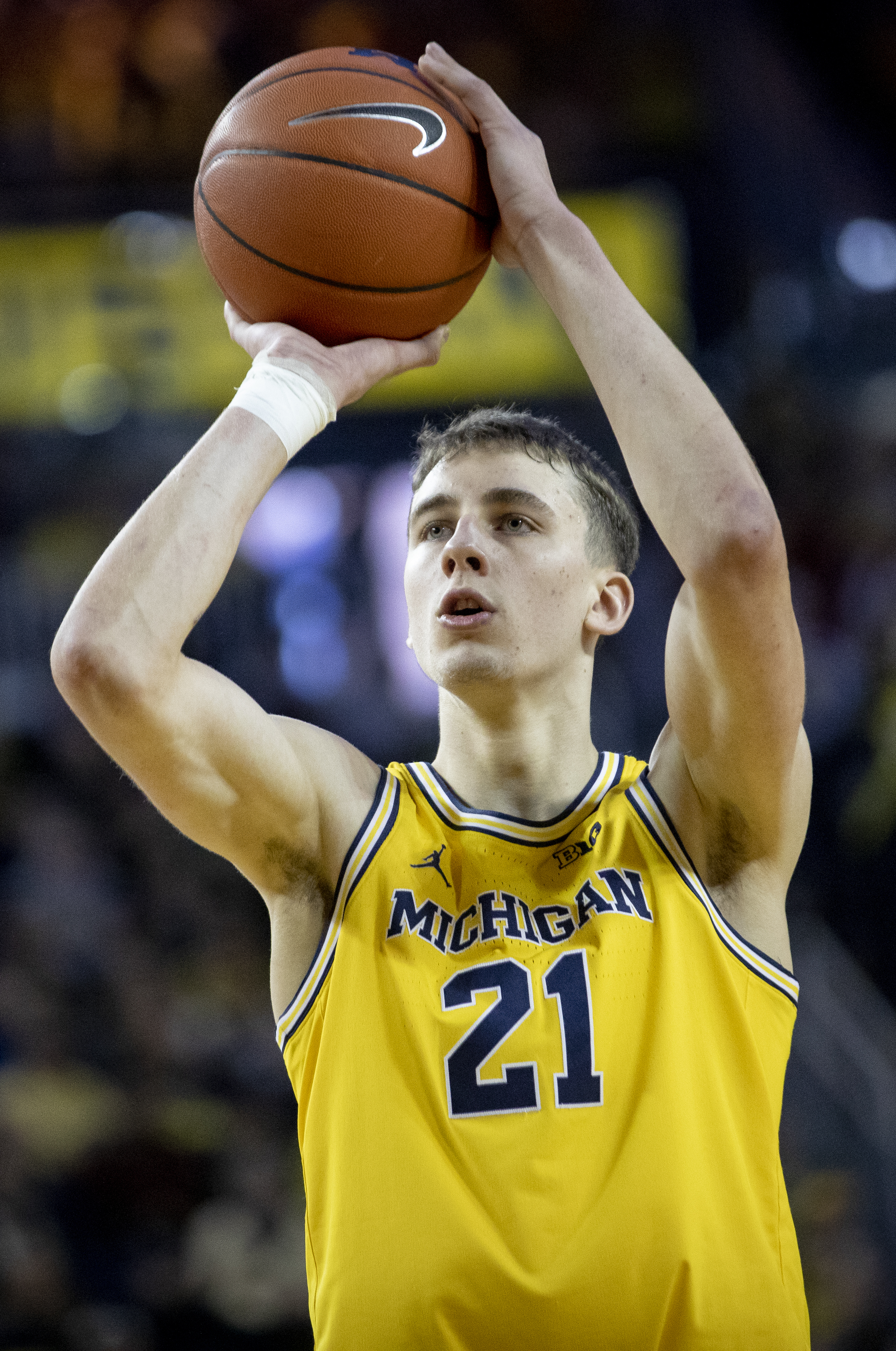
Wagner in 2019

On October 21, 2019, Wagner fractured his right wrist and was expected to miss four to six weeks. He made his season debut for the Wolverines on November 27, 2019, and finished the game with six points, three rebounds and one block in 23 minutes in an 83–76 victory over Iowa State in the quarterfinals of the Battle 4 Atlantis. On December 6, Wagner posted a career-high 18 points in a 103–91 victory over Iowa in its Big Ten Conference season opener, as Michigan had six double-digit scorers, including all five starters. On March 1, 2020, Wagner posted 18 points and 10 rebounds for his first career double-double in a 63–77 loss to Ohio State. Following the regular season, he was named to the 2020 Big Ten All-Freshman team.

During his sophomore season, Wagner posted 14 double-figure games and four 20-plus-point games, he averaged 13.0 points per game with 6.3 rebounds, a team-high 30 steals and a second-best 23 blocks. Following the season he was named second-team All-Big Ten by the coaches and third-team by the media. On May 4, 2021, he declared for the 2021 NBA draft forgoing his remaining college eligibility.

== Professional career ==
=== Alba Berlin (2017–2019) ===
In the 2018–19 season, Wagner played on a dual contract for both Alba Berlin in the Basketball Bundesliga (BBL), the top German league, and SSV Lokomotive Bernau in the third-tier ProB league. In May 2019, he won the BBL Best Young Player Award. In Game 2 of the BBL Finals against Bayern Munich, Wagner scored a team-high 14 points, making all six of his shots. By the end of the season, he was averaging 4.6 points in 12.4 minutes per game in the BBL and played limited minutes in the EuroCup.

=== Orlando Magic (2021–present) ===
==== 2021–22: All-Rookie honors ====
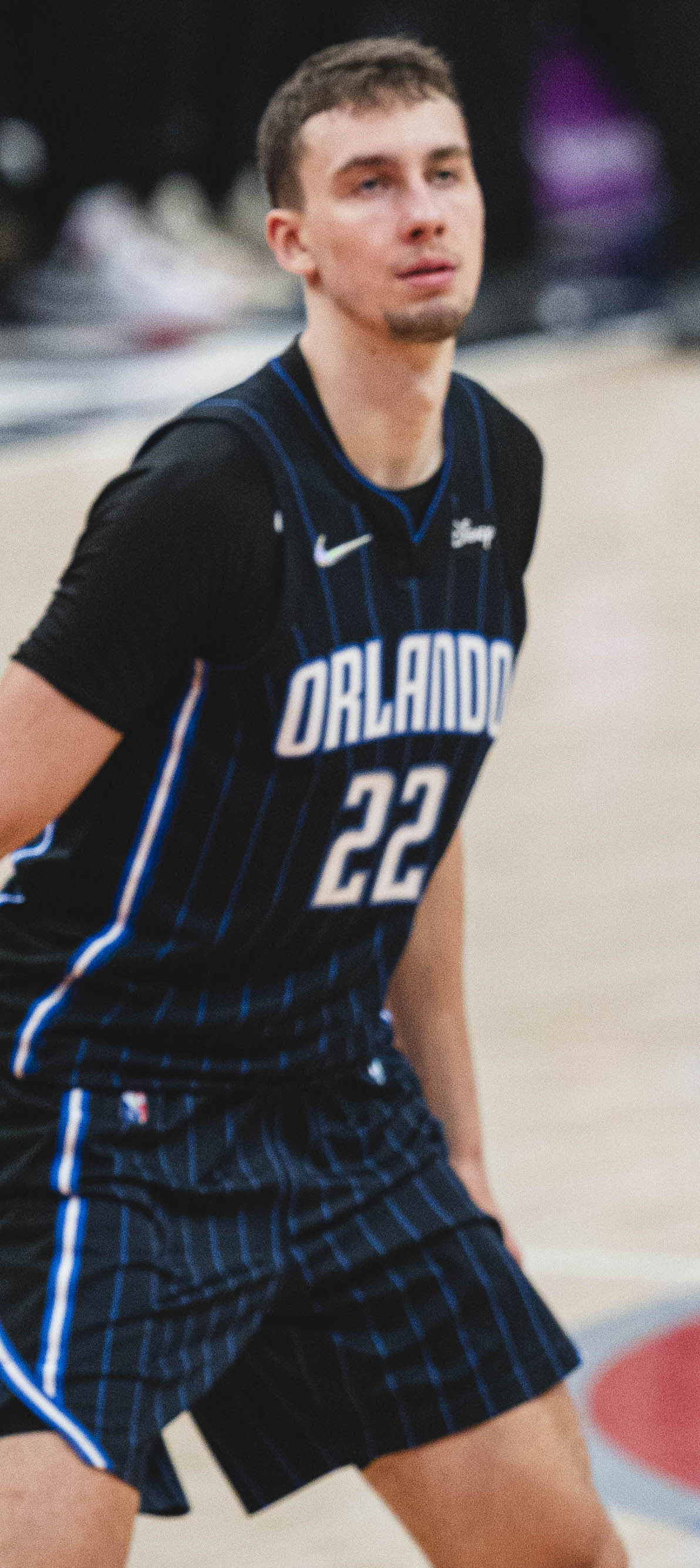
Wagner with the Orlando Magic in 2022

Wagner was selected with the eighth pick in the 2021 NBA draft by the Orlando Magic. He and fellow lottery pick Jalen Suggs signed with the Magic on August 3. Wagner posted his first NBA double-double with a career-high 11 rebounds and 14 points as well as 6 assists on December 18 against the Brooklyn Nets. On December 27, 2021, Wagner put up a career-high 38 points in a 127–110 loss to the Milwaukee Bucks. Wagner was named the NBA Eastern Conference Rookie of the Month for games played in December. Wagner's second NBA double-double occurred on January 12, 2022, against the Washington Wizards when he upped his career-high assist plateau from 6 to 10 and added 14 points. This marked the first time a Magic rookie forward had ever posted 10 or more assists in a game. Following the 2021–22 NBA season he was named to the NBA All-Rookie First Team.

==== 2022–24: Steady improvement ====
On November 5, 2022, Wagner scored a season-high 31 points and recorded six assists in a 126–123 overtime loss to the Sacramento Kings. On December 29, he was suspended by the NBA for one game without pay due to coming off the bench during an altercation in a game against the Detroit Pistons the day before. Wagner finished his sophomore season averaging 18.6 points, 4.1 rebounds and 3.5 assists per game.

In his third season, Wagner played 72 games for the Magic, posting career highs across the board with 19.7 points, 5.3 rebounds and 3.7 assists per game. On April 27, 2024, Wagner recorded 34 points on 13-of-17 shooting and 13 rebounds, securing his first playoff double-double to lead the Magic to a 112–89 victory over the Cavaliers in Game 4, tying the series 2–2.

==== 2024–present: Breakthrough ====
On July 6, 2024, the Magic signed Wagner to a contract extension reportedly worth $224 million.

On November 18, 2024, Wagner earned his first NBA Eastern Conference Player of the Week Award. On November 21, Wagner had a season-high 37 points, along with six rebounds, 11 assists, four steals and scored a game-winning three-pointer in a 119–118 victory against the Los Angeles Lakers. On December 6, Wagner put up 30 points, five rebounds, five assists, one steal and one block in a 102–94 loss to the Philadelphia 76ers. He achieved his third-consecutive 30-point game for the second time in his career, joining Shaquille O'Neal and Tracy McGrady as the only players in Magic franchise history to score at least 30 points in at least three consecutive games multiple times. On December 7, 2024, it was announced that Wagner had suffered from a torn right oblique, an injury which teammate Paolo Banchero suffered earlier in the season. Wagner returned on January 23, 2025, scoring 20 points in a 101–79 loss against the Portland Trail Blazers.

On November 22, 2025, Wagner scored a season-high 37 points, grabbed 6 rebounds and dished 7 assists to lead the Magic to a 133–121 win over the New York Knicks. On December 7, 2025, in a game against the New York Knicks, he suffered a high sprain of his left ankle in the first quarter; an MRI the following day revealed no structural damage, and he was initially expected to be sidelined for two to four weeks. On April 1, 2026, against the Atlanta Hawks, he returned to the court after missing 22 consecutive games, scoring 12 points in 20 minutes.

On November 5, 2026, Wagner recorded a career-high 15 assists, along with 15 points, eight rebounds and four steals, in a 117–104 loss to the Phoenix Suns. On November 11, Wagner tied his career-high by scoring 38 points and grabbing eight rebounds in the Magic's 123–108 victory over the Utah Jazz. In the next game, on November 13, Wagner recorded a near triple-double with 35 points, nine rebounds and 12 assists in a 107–99 victory over the Milwaukee Bucks.

== National team career ==
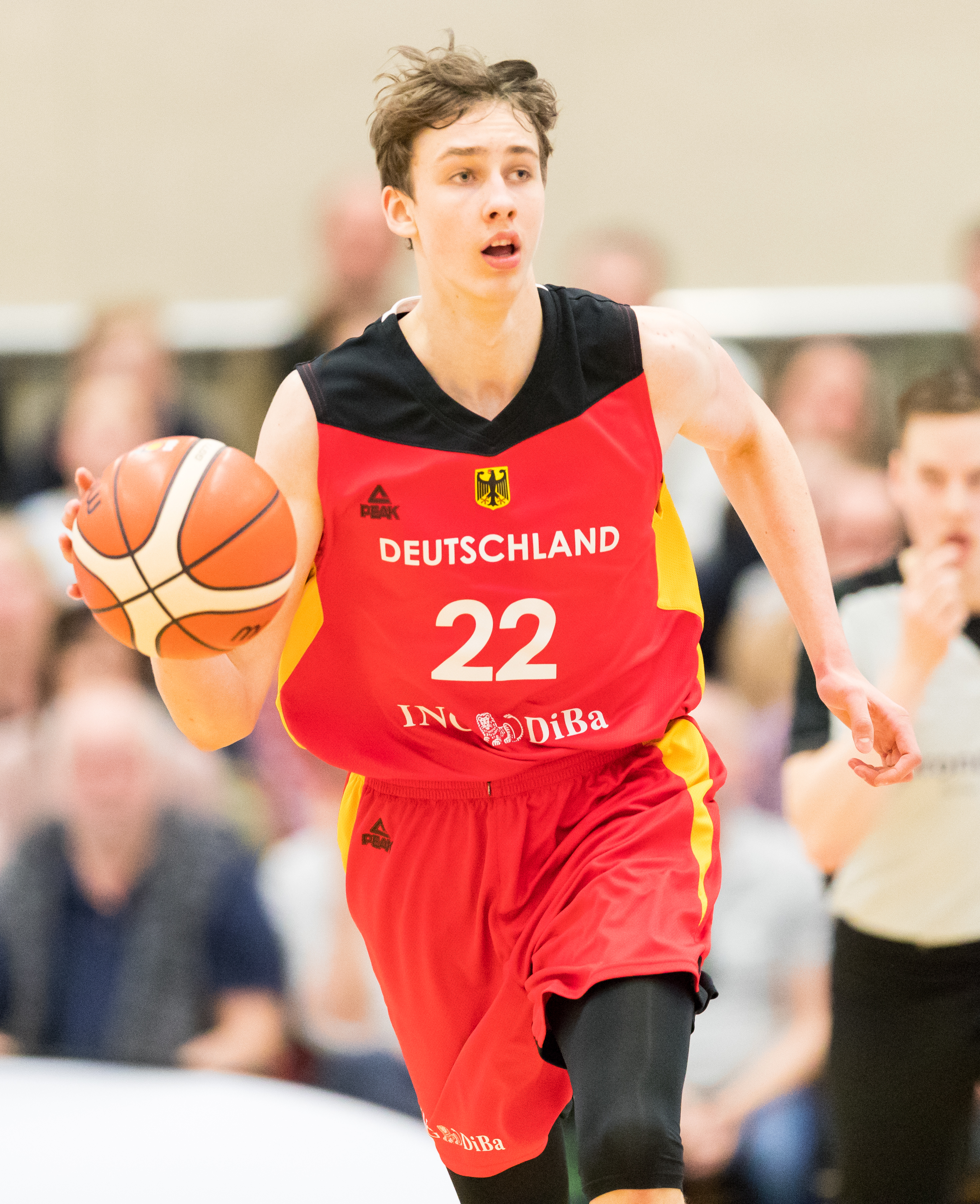
Wagner with the German U18 team at the Albert Schweitzer Tournament in 2018

Wagner played for Germany at the 2017 FIBA U16 European Championship in Podgorica, Montenegro. In five games, he averaged 7.4 points per game as his team finished in 13th place. In 2018, Wagner averaged six points per game and helped Germany win the gold medal at the Albert Schweitzer Tournament, an under-18 competition in Mannheim, Germany. In the 2019 FIBA U18 European Championship in Volos, Greece, he averaged 13 points and 4.8 rebounds per game, leading his team to 11th place. He missed one game with a back injury. In EuroBasket 2022, he averaged 16.1 points and 4 rebounds per game, beating Poland in his home city of Berlin to take home bronze for Germany.

In 2023, Wagner became world champion, winning gold at the 2023 FIBA Basketball World Cup with the German national team. It was the first time that Germany won this event. In recognition of his individual play, Wagner was named to the All-FIBA World Cup Second Team.

At the 2024 Olympics, after going unbeaten in Group B and winning over Greece in the quarterfinals, Germany lost to France, 69–73, in the semifinals. In the bronze medal game, Germany lost to Serbia 83–93. Wagner averaged 18.5 points, 5.8 rebounds, 2.5 assists and 2.0 steals in 6 games played. For his play, he was named to the tournament's All-Second Team.

At the EuroBasket 2025, the Germany men's national basketball team won the gold medal. Wagner and teammate Dennis Schröder were on the FIBA EuroBasket All-Tournament Team 1st team along with Luka Dončić, Giannis Antetokounmpo and Alperen Şengün.

== Honours ==
- BBL Best Young Player Award: 2018–19
- NBA All-Rookie First Team: 2021
- All-FIBA World Cup Second Team: 2023
- EuroBasket All-Tournament Team: 2025

== Career statistics ==
Legend
GP	Games played	GS	Games started	MPG	Minutes per game
FG%	Field goal percentage	3P%	3-point field goal percentage	FT%	Free throw percentage
RPG	Rebounds per game	APG	Assists per game	SPG	Steals per game
BPG	Blocks per game	PPG	Points per game	**Bold**	Career high
*	Led the league

=== NBA ===
==== Regular season ====
Year	Team	GP	GS	MPG	FG%	3P%	FT%	RPG	APG	SPG	BPG	PPG
2021–22	Orlando	79	79	30.7	.468	.354	.863	4.5	2.9	.9	**.4**	15.2
2022–23	Orlando	**80**	**80**	32.6	**.485**	**.361**	.842	4.1	3.5	1.0	.2	18.6
2023–24	Orlando	72	72	32.5	.482	.281	.850	5.3	3.7	1.1	**.4**	19.7
2024–25	Orlando	60	60	**33.7**	.463	.295	**.871**	**5.7**	**4.7**	**1.3**	**.4**	**24.2**
2025–26	Orlando	34	32	30.0	.481	.345	.823	5.2	3.3	.9	.3	20.6
Career		325	323	32.1	.475	.324	.851	4.9	3.6	1.0	.3	19.2

==== Playoffs ====
Year	Team	GP	GS	MPG	FG%	3P%	FT%	RPG	APG	SPG	BPG	PPG
2024	Orlando	**7**	**7**	37.0	.408	.265	.886	**6.9**	4.4	.7	**1.3**	18.9
2025	Orlando	5	5	**39.0**	**.443**	.189	.769	4.8	**5.6**	1.2	.4	**25.8**
2026	Orlando	4	4	30.5	.439	**.333**	**.933**	5.5	3.5	**2.8***	.3	16.8
Career		16	16	36.0	.429	.238	.859	5.9	4.6	1.4	.8	20.5

=== College ===
Year	Team	GP	GS	MPG	FG%	3P%	FT%	RPG	APG	SPG	BPG	PPG
2019–20	Michigan	27	27	30.8	.452	.311	.833	5.6	1.0	**1.3**	.6	11.6
2020–21	Michigan	**28**	**28**	**31.7**	**.477**	**.343**	**.835**	**6.5**	**3.0**	**1.3**	**1.0**	**12.5**
Career		55	55	31.2	.465	.325	.835	6.1	2.0	1.3	.8	12.0

== Personal life ==
Wagner is the younger brother of NBA player Moritz Wagner, who was his teammate on the Orlando Magic for five seasons. Moritz played three seasons of college basketball for Michigan and was a first-round pick in the 2018 NBA draft.
