= Pat Williams (basketball) =

American basketball player (1940–2024)

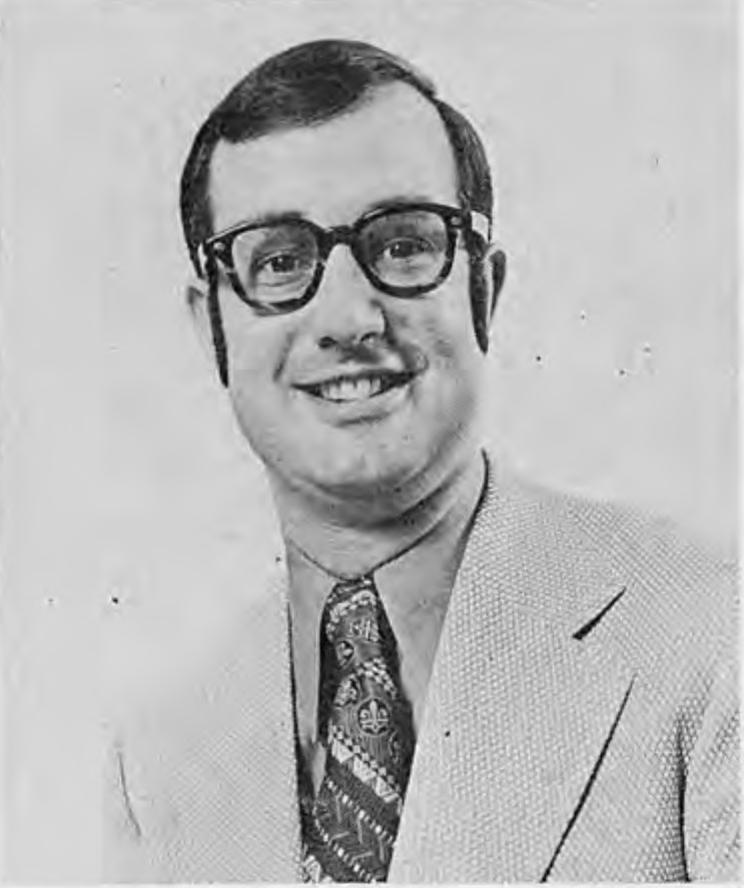
- Williams as general manager of the Chicago Bulls in 1971
- Born: Patrick Livingston Murphy Williams; May 3, 1940; Philadelphia, Pennsylvania, U.S.
- Died: July 17, 2024 (aged 84); Orlando, Florida, U.S.
- Education: Wake Forest University (BS); Indiana University (MS); Flagler College (LHD)
- Occupation: Sports executive
- Known for: General manager of the Philadelphia 76ers Senior vice president of the Orlando Magic
- Spouse(s): Jill Paige (m. 1972; div. 1996); Ruth Hanchey (m. 1997)
- Children: 18

Patrick Livingston Murphy Williams (May 3, 1940 – July 17, 2024) was an American sports executive, who served as senior vice president of the Orlando Magic. Williams began his career as a minor league baseball player, and later joined the front office of his team. In the late 1960s he moved into basketball, with his biggest achievements being the 1983 title of the Philadelphia 76ers and being a partner in the creation of the Orlando Magic.

== Early life ==
Williams was born in 1940 in Philadelphia, the second oldest of four children and the only son. He was raised in Wilmington, Delaware, attending Tower Hill School where his father coached and taught. He became a friend of Ruly Carpenter, son of Philadelphia Phillies owner Bob "R.R.M." Carpenter, who would bring Williams to the Phillies’ dugout and clubhouse, as well as to the team's spring training in Clearwater, Florida.

His interest in baseball would earn Williams a scholarship to Wake Forest University. There Williams earned a bachelor's degree in physical education in 1962 while being a catcher on the Demon Deacons baseball team. Williams later earned a master's of science degree in physical education from Indiana University in 1964, and served for seven years in the United States Army, He later got a doctorate in Humane Letters from Flagler College.

Former Chicago White Sox owner Bill Veeck is credited by Williams as his mentor, with a visit to Veeck in 1962 starting their friendship and giving Williams principles followed in his career, such as "Don’t announce promotions in advance, be out on the speaking circuit, stand at the gates when fans leave, open your own mail and don’t screen your calls".

== Baseball career ==
Williams' baseball career began when the Carpenters signed him in 1962 to the Miami Marlins, their minor league team in the Florida State League. He was a catcher for two years then retired and moved in to a front office role. Marlins general manager Bill Durney still saw in Williams an eager and natural leader with a marketing degree, and invited him to be the team's business manager. One year later, the Phillies appointed him to be the general manager of the Spartanburg Phillies. As the Phillies became a powerhouse of the Western Carolinas League, Williams was later elevated to the position of president of the organization in 1967, and was chosen the Minor League Executive of the Year by The Sporting News. Afterwards he spent three years in the Minnesota Twins organization.

Even after moving to basketball, Williams was still active in baseball—every winter, he played in Major League Fantasy Camps. He was also president of Orlando's Double-A Southern League team from 1990 to 1993.

== Basketball management ==
Williams moved into basketball in 1968, becoming the Philadelphia 76ers business manager. With promotions that included elaborate halftime shows and a successful 55-27 performance, the 76ers were third in attendance of the 1968–69 NBA season. Afterwards the faltering Chicago Bulls hired Williams to become their general manager. Williams immediately revamped the team's roster, trading with the Sixers for Chet Walker, and invested on the promotion, including the creation of mascot Benny the Bull. He succeeded Richie Guerin as general manager of the Atlanta Hawks on August 6, 1973, in that the Hawks had felt the need for a GM who specialized in promotion. He spent just one year in Atlanta, where his most notable action was trading star Pete Maravich for two players and five draft picks.

As the Sixers had become one of the worst teams in the NBA, owner Irv Kosloff invited Williams to return in 1974. Williams then remained in Philadelphia for 12 years as their general manager, helping to build the team that won the 1983 NBA Finals, by trading for Julius Erving and Moses Malone, and drafting Maurice Cheeks and Andrew Toney. Frustrated at his failure to build a 76ers dynasty despite bringing new talent such as Charles Barkley, Williams left the organization in 1986.

As the year before Orlando executive Jim Hewitt told Williams of his idea of bringing an NBA team to his city, he decided to join Hewitt's investment group. Williams invested in convincing NBA commissioner David Stern and the league owners of the viability of the small-town Florida city in supporting an NBA franchise. The league awarded the Orlando Magic an expansion spot in 1987, with the team making its debut in 1989. Serving as the franchise's inaugural manager, Williams helped the Magic reach the 1995 NBA Finals by drafting Shaquille O'Neal and trading a draft pick for Penny Hardaway. The following year, he was promoted to senior vice president of Magic parent company RDV Sports, Inc.

In his NBA career, Williams led his teams to 23 NBA Playoffs and five NBA Finals. He won four NBA draft lotteries, including back-to-back winners in 1992 and 1993 and most recently in 2004. Williams signed Billy Cunningham, Chuck Daly, and Matt Guokas to their first professional coaching contracts. Nineteen of his former players have become NBA head coaches.

Williams announced his retirement in April 2019.

== Major League Baseball expansion efforts ==
On November 20, 2019, Williams held a press conference announcing the start of an effort to bring a major-league baseball team to Orlando, Florida. The suggested name for this franchise is the Orlando Dreamers. He cited the a strong built-in fan base and the rapidly growing city population as reasons why Orlando should be considered for an expansion team. Williams indicated he would continue to gauge Orlando's interest in a baseball team and then, based on those results, determine what the next steps should be.

== Personal life and death ==
Williams met his first wife, Jill, during his time in Chicago. They married in 1972 and divorced in 1996, being the parents of 18 children, 4 biological and 14 adopted from four nations between 1983 and 1993. His daughter Karyn is a Christian singer, and son Robert a pro scout for the Los Angeles Angels. In 1997, he married his second wife Ruth, a consultant with FranklinCovey Co., who brought to the house a child of her own.

Williams died from complications of viral pneumonia on July 17, 2024, at the age of 84.

== Awards ==
Williams is a member of the Wake Forest Sports Hall of Fame after catching for the Deacon baseball team, including the 1962 Atlantic Coast Conference Championship team. He was inducted into the Delaware Sports Museum and Hall of Fame in 2001. He won the DECA Entrepreneurial Spirit award at DECA's International Career Development Conference in 2011.

On February 24, 2012, Williams was announced as that year's winner of the John Bunn Award, presented annually by the Naismith Memorial Basketball Hall of Fame for significant lifetime contributions to the sport. He formally received the award on September 6, the day before the induction ceremony for the Hall's 2012 class.

In 2013, Williams received the "Legacy of Excellence" inductee honor from the Philadelphia Sports Hall of Fame. He emceed the majority of the organization's Induction Ceremonies over the past two decades.

Preceded by Dick Klein	Chicago Bulls General Manager; 1969–1973	Succeeded by Dick Motta
Preceded by Richie Guerin	Atlanta Hawks General Manager; 1973–1974	Succeeded by William Wilcox
Preceded by Don DeJardin	Philadelphia 76ers General Manager; 1974–1986	Succeeded by John Nash
Preceded by Position created	Orlando Magic General Manager; 1989–1996	Succeeded by John Gabriel
