= 1999–2000 Orlando Magic season =

NBA professional basketball team season

- Head coach: Doc Rivers
- General manager: John Gabriel
- Owners: RDV Sports, Inc.
- Arena: TD Waterhouse Centre

Results
- Record: 41–41 (.500)
- Place: Division: 4th (Atlantic); Conference: 9th (Eastern)
- Playoff finish: Did not qualify
- Stats at Basketball Reference

Local media
- Television: Sunshine Network; WBRW

The 1999–2000 Orlando Magic season was the 11th season for the Orlando Magic in the National Basketball Association.

== Season summary ==
=== Off-season ===
During the off-season, the team hired retired NBA point guard, and former Turner Sports broadcast analyst Doc Rivers as their new head coach.

The Magic changed their roster by making plenty of off-season acquisitions. The team acquired Tariq Abdul-Wahad from the Sacramento Kings, acquired Chris Gatling from the Milwaukee Bucks, and acquired Ben Wallace from the Washington Wizards. The Magic also acquired second-year forward Pat Garrity from the Phoenix Suns, acquired Anthony Parker from the Philadelphia 76ers, and acquired rookie shooting guard, and first-round draft pick Corey Maggette out of Duke University from the Seattle SuperSonics; Maggette was drafted by the SuperSonics as the 13th overall pick in the 1999 NBA draft. The team signed free agents, second-year center John Amaechi, Monty Williams, and undrafted rookie point guard Chucky Atkins.

=== Regular season ===
Under Rivers and with the addition of Gatling, Abdul-Wahad, Amaechi, Maggette and Wallace, the Magic got off to a 15–11 start to the regular season. However, the team struggled losing 13 of their next 14 games, including an eight-game losing streak in January, and later on held a 24–26 record at the All-Star break. At mid-season, the team traded Abdul-Wahad, and Gatling to the Denver Nuggets in exchange for Ron Mercer, Chauncey Billups and former Magic forward Johnny Taylor; however, Billups never played for the Magic due to a shoulder injury he sustained with the Nuggets, while second-year forward Matt Harpring only played just four games due to an ankle injury. The Magic played around .500 in winning percentage as the season progressed, posting a seven-game winning streak between March and April, and finishing in fourth place in the Atlantic Division with a 41–41 record; however, the team failed to qualify for the NBA playoffs by finishing in ninth place in the Eastern Conference, and just one game behind the 8th–seeded Milwaukee Bucks.

Darrell Armstrong averaged 16.2 points, 6.1 assists and 2.1 steals per game, and led the Magic with 137 three-point field goals, while Mercer averaged 15.2 points and 1.4 steals per game in 31 games after the trade, and Amaechi contributed 10.5 points and 3.3 rebounds per game. In addition, off the bench, Atkins provided the team with 9.5 points and 3.7 assists per game, and was named to the NBA All-Rookie Second Team, while Williams averaged 8.7 points and 3.3 rebounds per game, Maggette contributed 8.4 points and 3.9 rebounds per game, and Garrity provided with 8.2 points per game. On the defensive side, Bo Outlaw averaged 6.0 points, 6.4 rebounds, 1.4 steals and 1.8 blocks per game, while Wallace provided with 4.8 points, 8.2 rebounds and 1.6 blocks per game, and second-year center Michael Doleac contributed 7.0 points and 4.1 rebounds per game.

Despite the Magic missing the playoffs, Rivers was named the NBA Coach of the Year, finishing in first place with 60 out of a possible 121 votes from the media, while Phil Jackson of the Los Angeles Lakers finished in second place with 53 votes; Jackson led the Lakers to a league-best 67–15 record during the regular season. Armstrong finished tied in 13th place in Most Valuable Player voting, while Amaechi finished tied in sixth place in Most Improved Player voting, and Outlaw finished tied in eighth place in Defensive Player of the Year voting. This season was also characterized by the slogan "Heart and Hustle", as the team was known for its hard-working style.

The Magic finished 26th in the NBA in home-game attendance, with an attendance of 576,409 at the TD Waterhouse Centre during the regular season, which was the fourth-lowest in the league.

=== Aftermath ===
Following the season, Wallace and Atkins were both traded to the Detroit Pistons, while Billups signed as a free agent with the Minnesota Timberwolves, and Mercer signed with the Chicago Bulls. Meanwhile, Maggette was traded along with Derek Strong to the Los Angeles Clippers on draft day, Harpring was dealt to the Cleveland Cavaliers, and Parker and Taylor were both released to free agency.

== Draft picks ==
Round	Pick	Player	Position	Nationality	School/Club team
2	38	Laron Profit	SG	United States	Maryland

== Roster ==
1999–2000 Orlando Magic roster
Players

Pos.	No.	Player	Height	Weight	DOB	From
C	13	John Amaechi	6 ft 10 in (2.08 m)	270 lb (122 kg)	1970–11–26	Penn State
G	10	Darrell Armstrong	6 ft 0 in (1.83 m)	170 lb (77 kg)	1968–06–22	Fayetteville State
G	31	Chucky Atkins	5 ft 11 in (1.80 m)	160 lb (73 kg)	1974–08–14	South Florida
G	2	Chauncey Billups (injured) (IN)	6 ft 3 in (1.91 m)	202 lb (92 kg)	1976–09–25	Colorado
C	51	Michael Doleac	6 ft 11 in (2.11 m)	262 lb (119 kg)	1977–06–15	Utah
F	8	Pat Garrity	6 ft 9 in (2.06 m)	238 lb (108 kg)	1976–08–23	Notre Dame
F	15	Matt Harpring (injured)	6 ft 7 in (2.01 m)	231 lb (105 kg)	1976–05–31	Georgia Tech
G	24	Anthony Johnson	6 ft 3 in (1.91 m)	190 lb (86 kg)	1974–10–02	College of Charleston
G/F	50	Corey Maggette	6 ft 6 in (1.98 m)	218 lb (99 kg)	1979–11–12	Duke
G/F	5	Ron Mercer	6 ft 7 in (2.01 m)	210 lb (95 kg)	1976–05–18	Kentucky
F	45	Bo Outlaw	6 ft 8 in (2.03 m)	210 lb (95 kg)	1971–04–13	Houston
F	33	Derek Strong	6 ft 8 in (2.03 m)	220 lb (100 kg)	1968–02–09	Xavier
F	23	Johnny Taylor	6 ft 9 in (2.06 m)	220 lb (100 kg)	1974–06–04	Chattanooga
F/C	4	Ben Wallace	6 ft 9 in (2.06 m)	240 lb (109 kg)	1974–09–10	Virginia Union
F	3	Monty Williams	6 ft 8 in (2.03 m)	225 lb (102 kg)	1971–10–08	Notre Dame

Coaches
Head coach
- Doc Rivers
Assistant(s)
- Johnny Davis
- Eric Musselman
- Tom Sterner
- Dave Wohl

Legend
- (DP) Unsigned draft pick
- (FA) Free agent
- (S) Suspended
- (IN) Inactive
- Injured

Roster
Updated: February 24, 2000

=== Roster notes ===
- Point guard Chauncey Billups was acquired by the Magic from the Denver Nuggets in a mid-season trade, but was placed on the injured reserve list due to a shoulder injury he sustained with the Nuggets, and did not play for the Magic.

== Regular season ==
=== Season standings ===
Atlantic Division	W	L	PCT	GB	Home	Road	Div
y-Miami Heat	52	30	.634	–	33–8	19–22	18–6
x-New York Knicks	50	32	.610	2	33–8	17–24	14–10
x-Philadelphia 76ers	49	33	.598	3	29–12	20–21	13–11
Orlando Magic	41	41	.500	11	26–15	15–26	12–13
Boston Celtics	35	47	.427	17	26–15	9–32	12–12
New Jersey Nets	31	51	.378	21	22–19	9–32	9–16
Washington Wizards	29	53	.354	23	17–24	12–29	7–17

#	Eastern Conference				
#	Team	W	L	PCT	GB
1	c-Indiana Pacers	56	26	.683	–
2	y-Miami Heat	52	30	.634	4
3	x-New York Knicks	50	32	.610	6
4	x-Charlotte Hornets	49	33	.598	7
5	x-Philadelphia 76ers	49	33	.598	7
6	x-Toronto Raptors	45	37	.549	11
7	x-Detroit Pistons	42	40	.512	14
8	x-Milwaukee Bucks	42	40	.512	14
9	Orlando Magic	41	41	.500	15
10	Boston Celtics	35	47	.427	21
11	Cleveland Cavaliers	32	50	.390	24
12	New Jersey Nets	31	51	.378	25
13	Washington Wizards	29	53	.354	27
14	Atlanta Hawks	28	54	.341	28
15	Chicago Bulls	17	65	.207	39

z – clinched division title
y – clinched division title
x – clinched playoff spot

== Player statistics ==
=== Regular season ===
Player	POS	GP	GS	MP	REB	AST	STL	BLK	PTS	MPG	RPG	APG	SPG	BPG	PPG
Darrell Armstrong	PG	82	82	2,590	270	501	169	9	1,330	31.6	3.3	6.1	2.1	.1	16.2
Bo Outlaw	PF	82	55	2,326	525	245	113	148	490	28.4	6.4	3.0	1.4	1.8	6.0
Pat Garrity	SF	82	1	1,479	210	58	31	19	675	18.0	2.6	.7	.4	.2	8.2
Chucky Atkins	PG	82	0	1,626	126	306	52	3	782	19.8	1.5	3.7	.6	.0	9.5
Ben Wallace	PF	81	81	1,959	665	67	72	130	390	24.2	8.2	.8	.9	1.6	4.8
Michael Doleac	C	81	29	1,335	334	63	29	34	565	16.5	4.1	.8	.4	.4	7.0
John Amaechi	C	80	53	1,684	266	95	35	37	836	21.1	3.3	1.2	.4	.5	10.5
Corey Maggette	SF	77	5	1,370	303	61	24	26	646	17.8	3.9	.8	.3	.3	8.4
Monty Williams	SF	75	23	1,501	250	106	46	17	651	20.0	3.3	1.4	.6	.2	8.7
Tariq Abdul-Wahad^{†}	SG	46	46	1,205	239	72	53	16	563	26.2	5.2	1.6	1.2	.3	12.2
Chris Gatling^{†}	PF	45	0	1,041	297	40	48	10	598	23.1	6.6	.9	1.1	.2	13.3
Ron Mercer^{†}	SG	31	31	969	98	54	42	8	470	31.3	3.2	1.7	1.4	.3	15.2
Derek Strong	PF	20	0	148	44	4	5	2	54	7.4	2.2	.2	.3	.1	2.7
Anthony Johnson^{†}	PG	18	4	214	12	13	10	2	62	11.9	.7	.7	.6	.1	3.4
Anthony Parker	SG	16	0	185	27	10	8	4	57	11.6	1.7	.6	.5	.3	3.6
Johnny Taylor^{†}	SF	5	0	29	5	1	1	1	11	5.8	1.0	.2	.2	.2	2.2
Matt Harpring	SF	4	0	63	12	8	5	1	16	15.8	3.0	2.0	1.3	.3	4.0
Kiwane Garris	SG	3	0	23	1	2	0	0	4	7.7	.3	.7	.0	.0	1.3
Earl Boykins^{†}	PG	1	0	8	1	3	0	0	6	8.0	1.0	3.0	.0	.0	6.0

- ^{†} Denotes player spent time with another team in the season. Stats reflect time with the Magic only.

== Awards and records ==
- Doc Rivers – Coach of the Year
- John Gabriel – Executive of the Year
- Chucky Atkins – All-Rookie 2nd Team
