= John Gabriel =

John Gabriel may refer to:

- John Gabriel (basketball), executive in the National Basketball Association
- John Gabriel (actor) (1931–2021), American actor
- Jonathan "John" Gabriel, a character in the webcomic Penny Arcade
