= Orlando Magic =

National Basketball Association team in Orlando, Florida

- 2026–27 Orlando Magic season
- Conference: Eastern
- Division: Southeast
- Founded: 1989
- History: Orlando Magic; 1989–present
- Arena: Kia Center
- Location: Orlando, Florida
- Team colors: Magic blue, black, silver
- Main sponsor: Walt Disney World
- CEO: Alex Martins
- President: Jeff Weltman
- General manager: Anthony Parker
- Head coach: Sean Sweeney
- Ownership: RDV Sports, Inc. (Dan DeVos, chairman)
- Affiliation: Osceola Magic
- Championships: 0
- Conference titles: 2 (1995, 2009)
- Division titles: 8 (1995, 1996, 2008, 2009, 2010, 2019, 2024, 2025)
- Retired numbers: 2 (6, 32)
- Website: nba.com/magic
Association	Icon	Statement
City

The Orlando Magic are an American professional basketball team based in Orlando, Florida. The Magic compete in the National Basketball Association (NBA) as a member of the Southeast Division of the Eastern Conference. The franchise was established in 1989 as an expansion franchise. Notable NBA stars as Shaquille O'Neal, Penny Hardaway, Grant Hill, Tracy McGrady, and Dwight Howard, have played for the club throughout its history. As of today, the franchise has played in the NBA playoffs 19 times in 37 seasons, and twice went to the NBA Finals, in 1995 and 2009, losing to the Houston Rockets and the Los Angeles Lakers, respectively.

== History ==
=== 1985–1986: Team creation ===
In September 1985, Orlando businessman Jim L. Hewitt approached Philadelphia 76ers general manager Pat Williams as they met in Texas on his idea of bringing an NBA team to Orlando. Intrigued by the potential of an Orlando-based NBA team, Williams became the front man of the investment group one year later, after he left the 76ers. On June 19, 1986, the two held a news conference to announce their intention of seeking an NBA franchise.

At the same time, Hewitt and Williams decided to hold a contest in the Orlando Sentinel newspaper to get names for their new franchise. Out of a total of 4,296 submitted entries, the names were subsequently narrowed to four, "Heat", "Tropics", "Juice", and "Magic". The last one, which had been submitted by 11 people, was picked after Williams brought his seven-year-old daughter Karyn to visit in Orlando. On July 27, 1986, it was announced that the committee chose the Magic to be the new name of the Orlando franchise in the NBA. The name "Magic" alludes to the area's biggest tourist attraction and economic engine Walt Disney World, along with its Magic Kingdom, highlighting its corporate theme of magic. Hewitt added that "You look at all the aspects of Central Florida, and you find it really is an exciting place, a magical place."

Many, including Williams himself at first, thought that Miami or Tampa were better locations in Florida for a franchise. At the time, Orlando was a small city without a major airport or a suitable arena. Hewitt brought investors such as real estate developer William duPont, Orlando Renegades owner Don Dizney, and Southern Fruit Citrus owners Jim and Steve Caruso, and talked the Orlando city officials into approving an arena project. Meanwhile, Williams gave presentations to NBA commissioner David Stern and the owners of the other teams of the league that the town was viable.

In April, the franchise committee recommended expanding by three teams, with two of the slots going to Charlotte and Minneapolis-St. Paul. The recommendation put the Orlando bid in doubt, since it advised that the state of Florida should only be allocated one team as part of the three-team expansion. This feedback put the planned Orlando franchise up against the Miami-based team, originally known as the Florida Heat and eventually named the Miami Heat. When both Miami and Orlando ownership groups made successful pitches, the expansion committee decided to expand by four teams, allowing both to have a franchise.

The Magic became the first-ever major-league professional sports franchise in the Orlando area, following an expansion fee of reportedly $32.5 million. They were one of the four new expansion franchises awarded by the NBA in 1987 along with the Charlotte Hornets, Miami Heat and Minnesota Timberwolves. The Magic hired Matt Guokas as the team's first coach, who helped the Magic select 12 players in the NBA expansion draft on June 15, 1989.

=== 1989–1992: Early years ===
The Magic, in their debut year, selected Nick Anderson from Illinois in the first round of the 1989 NBA draft. As the 11th pick, he was the team's first franchise player and leading scorer for a decade. The Magic's very first game played was an exhibition game on October 13, 1989, against the then-reigning champion Detroit Pistons, which the Magic won. Anderson was quoted as saying the atmosphere and the people watching the game was "like Game 7 of the NBA Finals".

On November 4, 1989, the Magic played their first season game at the Orlando Arena (O-Rena) against the visiting New Jersey Nets, who won 111–106 in a hard-fought game. The Magic's first victory came two days later, as the Magic defeated the New York Knicks 118–110. The inaugural team compiled a record of 18–64 with players including the franchise star player Nick Anderson, Reggie Theus, Scott Skiles, Terry Catledge, Sam Vincent, Otis Smith, and Jerry Reynolds.

In the 1990 NBA draft, the Orlando Magic selected Dennis Scott with the fourth overall pick. On December 30, 1990, Scott Skiles racked up 30 assists in the 155–116 victory over the Denver Nuggets, breaking Kevin Porter's NBA single-game assists record (29). Skiles was named the NBA's Most Improved Player at the end of the season, as the Magic heralded the NBA's most improved record that season. Forward Dennis Scott set a team mark with 125 three-point field goals for the season, the best long-distance production by a rookie in NBA history. He was named to the NBA All-Rookie First Team.

On September 19, 1991, the DeVos family, founders of Amway, purchased the franchise for $85 million. Family patriarch Richard DeVos became the owner of the franchise. The 1991–92 season was disappointing for the Magic as various players missed games with injuries. Dennis Scott played only 18 games, Nick Anderson missed 22 games, Stanley Roberts, Jerry Reynolds, Brian Williams, Sam Vincent and Otis Smith all missed at least 27 games each. With a shortage of healthy players, the team struggled through a 17-game losing streak and finished with a 21–61 record. The Magic still managed to have all 41 home games sold out.

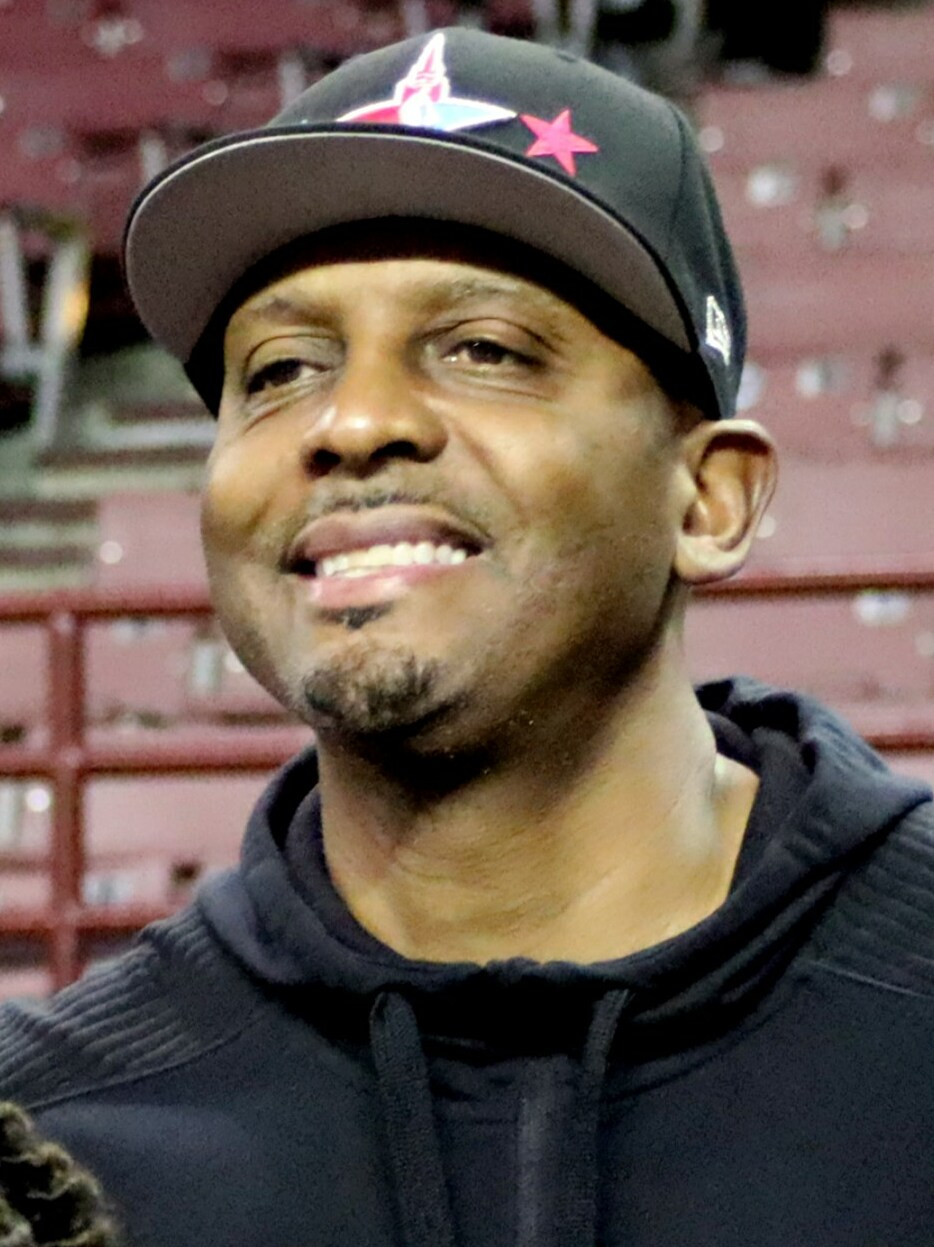
Penny Hardaway in 2023

=== 1992–1996: The Shaquille O'Neal and Penny Hardaway era ===
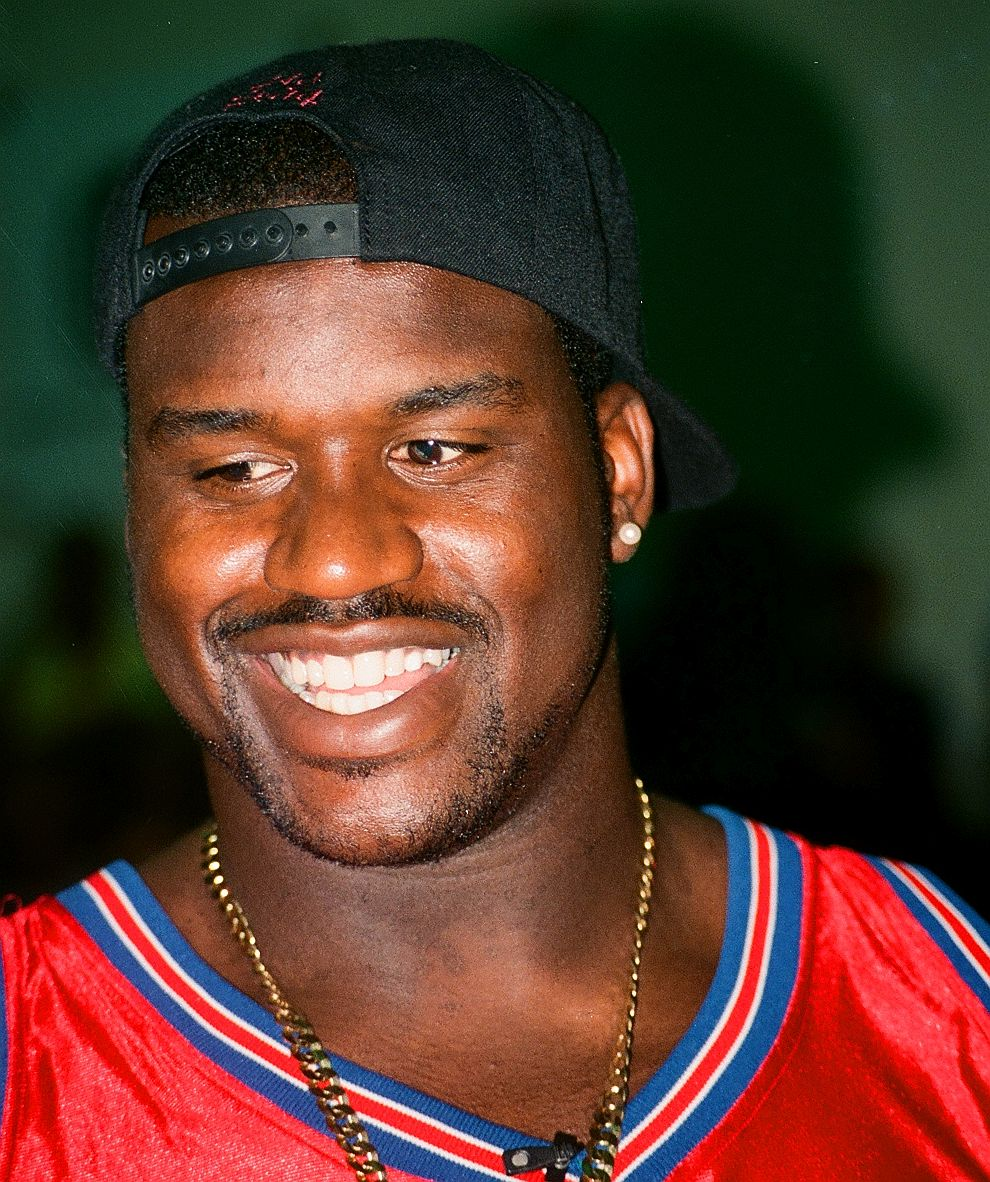
Shaquille O’ Neal in 1998

The Magic's history was changed on May 17, 1992, when the franchise won the first pick in the 1992 NBA draft Lottery. The Magic selected big-man Shaquille O'Neal from Louisiana State University, the biggest prize in the draft since the Knicks won Patrick Ewing. O'Neal, a 7 ft 1 in (2.16 m) center, made an immediate impact on the Magic, leading the team to a 41–41 record. The Magic again became the NBA's most improved franchise, as they improved by 20 games. O'Neal was the first rookie to be voted an All-Star starter since Michael Jordan in 1985. He also became the 1992–93 NBA Rookie of the Year. Despite O'Neal's presence, the Magic missed the 1993 NBA playoffs because they were tied with the Indiana Pacers for the eighth and final playoff spot in the Eastern Conference with the Pacers holding the tiebreaker.

Despite barely missing the playoffs and receiving the least chance of gaining the top draft pick with only one ball in the lottery, the Magic again won the first pick in the 1993 NBA draft Lottery. Prior to the draft, Guokas stepped down as head coach, and Brian Hill was promoted to become the Magic's second head coach. In the draft, the Magic selected Chris Webber, but traded him to the Golden State Warriors for the number three pick, guard Penny Hardaway and three future first-round draft picks. With the combination of O'Neal and Hardaway, the Magic became a dominant team in the NBA, compiling the first 50 win season in franchise history with a 50–32 record. The Magic were in the playoffs for the first time, ranked the fourth seed in the Eastern Conference; however, the Pacers swept the Magic 3–0 in the first round, thus ending the Magic's season.

In the 1994–95 season, the Magic's sixth season, All-Star forward Horace Grant was acquired as a free agent from the Chicago Bulls. The Orlando Magic compiled a 57–25 record, best in the East and winning the Atlantic Division title, becoming the second-fastest team (behind the Milwaukee Bucks in 1971, who were in their third season) to advance to the NBA Finals in league history. In the playoffs, the Magic defeated the Boston Celtics, Bulls, and the Pacers, advancing to the NBA Finals where O'Neal, Hardaway and the young Magic bowed to a more playoff-experienced Hakeem Olajuwon and the Houston Rockets, winning their second consecutive championship in a 4–0 sweep of Orlando.

In the 1995–96 season, the Magic again were near the top of the Eastern Conference and the Atlantic Division with a 60–22 record, led by O'Neal and Hardaway; however, the Magic were seeded number two, behind the NBA's second-best all-time 72–10 record of the Chicago Bulls. In the meantime, general manager Pat Williams was promoted to senior executive vice president and replaced by the vice president of basketball operations John Gabriel on April 29, 1996. In the playoffs, after the Magic defeated the Detroit Pistons and the Atlanta Hawks, Orlando met the Bulls in the Eastern Conference Finals. The combination of Jordan, Scottie Pippen and rebounder Dennis Rodman was too much for the Magic, and Orlando was swept 4–0.

=== 1996–1999: The post-Shaq/Penny Hardaway era ===
In the off-season, O'Neal left as a free agent to the Los Angeles Lakers, dealing a huge blow to the Magic franchise. In the middle of the season, urged by player discontent, management fired coach Brian Hill and named Richie Adubato as interim coach for the rest of the season. Under Adubato, the Magic went 21–12 to compile a 45–37 record, led by Penny Hardaway. In the playoffs, the Magic quickly fell 0–2 to the heavily favored Miami Heat in the first round, but Hardaway battled back with consecutive 40-point games to assure a game five (the first player to do so), which the Magic ultimately lost.

The Magic then hired Chuck Daly to be head coach for the 1997–98 season. In addition, Hall of Famer Julius Erving joined the Magic's front office, giving Orlando hope for a successful season. The season was hampered by an injury to Hardaway who sat out the majority of the season. Anderson, combined with newly acquired free agent Bo Outlaw, led the team to a 41–41 record, just out of reach of the NBA playoffs. In addition, Rony Seikaly was traded during the season to the New Jersey Nets for three role players and a future draft pick.

In 1998–99, with the drafting of Michael Doleac and Matt Harpring with the 12th and 15th picks in the 1998 draft, and a healthy Penny Hardaway and Nick Anderson, the Magic tied for the Eastern Conference's best record with the Miami Heat in the lockout-shortened season, 33–17. At the heart of the team was veteran and future Orlando Magic Hall of Famer Darrell Armstrong, leading from the vanguard (a constant that Orlando fans would enjoy for a decade) and picking up the NBA's Sixth-Man and Most Improved Player awards along the way. Orlando also acquired NBA great Dominique Wilkins, along with brother Gerald, who were past their primes but were both still serviceable NBA players. In the playoffs the Penny Hardaway-led Magic were seeded number 3 because of tiebreakers and faced the Philadelphia 76ers. The 76ers, led by Allen Iverson, upset the Magic 3–1 in the first round. The team also changed their uniforms for the first time ever, changing from pinstripes to stars.

=== 1999–2000: "Heart and Hustle" season ===
In 1999, the Magic, under general manager John Gabriel, who was later named Executive of the Year, hired rookie-coach Doc Rivers. Gabriel dismantled the previous team trading their only remaining superstar Penny Hardaway to the Phoenix Suns for Danny Manning (who never donned a Magic uniform), Pat Garrity, and two future draft picks. The Magic were then a team composed of virtually all no name players and little experience, which included team captain Armstrong, Bo Outlaw and a young Ben Wallace, along with Coach Rivers, who led the Magic to a 41–41 record, barely missing out on the playoffs. At the end of the season Rivers was named Coach of the Year. That year was characterized by the slogan "Heart and Hustle", as the team was known for its hard-working style.

=== 2000–2004: The Tracy McGrady era ===
The following off-season, Gabriel, with millions of cleared salary cap space, attempted to lure three of the NBA's most prized free agents: Tim Duncan, Grant Hill, and Tracy McGrady. While Duncan opted to remain with the San Antonio Spurs, the Magic acquired Hill, a perennial All-Star, and McGrady. With McGrady and Hill together, the Magic were expected to be a force in the East. However, Hill was limited to 4 games because of an ankle injury. McGrady blossomed into a star during the season, becoming one of the NBA's top scorers. With the addition of Mike Miller from the draft, the Magic compiled a 43–39 record, which included a nine-game winning streak, and once again made the playoffs. McGrady made the All-Star Team and All-NBA Second Team. Miller won the Rookie of the Year. In the playoffs, they faced the Milwaukee Bucks in the first round. The Bucks won the series 3–1.

In 2001–02, McGrady led the Magic to a winning record of 44–38. Hill was still severely limited by his ankle injury, and did not play for the vast majority of the season. McGrady, combined with Armstrong, Miller, and 3-point sharpshooter Pat Garrity, formed the core of the team. McGrady made the All-NBA for the first time and made his second consecutive All-Star Team. However, the Magic were defeated 3–1 in the first round of the playoffs by the Charlotte Hornets led by Baron Davis.

In 2002–03, with the acquisitions of Gordan Giricek and Drew Gooden from the Memphis Grizzlies in exchange for Mike Miller, McGrady once again led the Magic to a 42–40 record. McGrady led the league in scoring with 32.1 points per game, made his second All-NBA First Team, and Third All-Star Team. Despite still not having Hill due to injury, the Magic entered the playoffs for the third straight year. However, after taking a 3–1 lead in the best-of-seven first-round series, the Magic fell to the Detroit Pistons 4–3. McGrady was quoted as saying, "It feels good to get in the second round" after still needing one more win to advance.

The Magic's 15th season in 2003–04 proved to be one of its toughest ever. Even with the acquisition of veteran free agents Tyronn Lue and Juwan Howard, the Magic struggled early. After winning its first game, the Magic lost 19 consecutive games, setting a franchise record. They never recovered, and finished an NBA worst 21–61. Despite this, McGrady led the league in scoring with 28.0 points per game, made the All-NBA Second Team and his fourth consecutive All-Star Team. In the middle of the 19-game losing streak, coach Doc Rivers was fired, and assistant Johnny Davis was promoted to head coach. General manager Gabriel was replaced by John Weisbrod.

=== 2004–2012: The Dwight Howard era ===
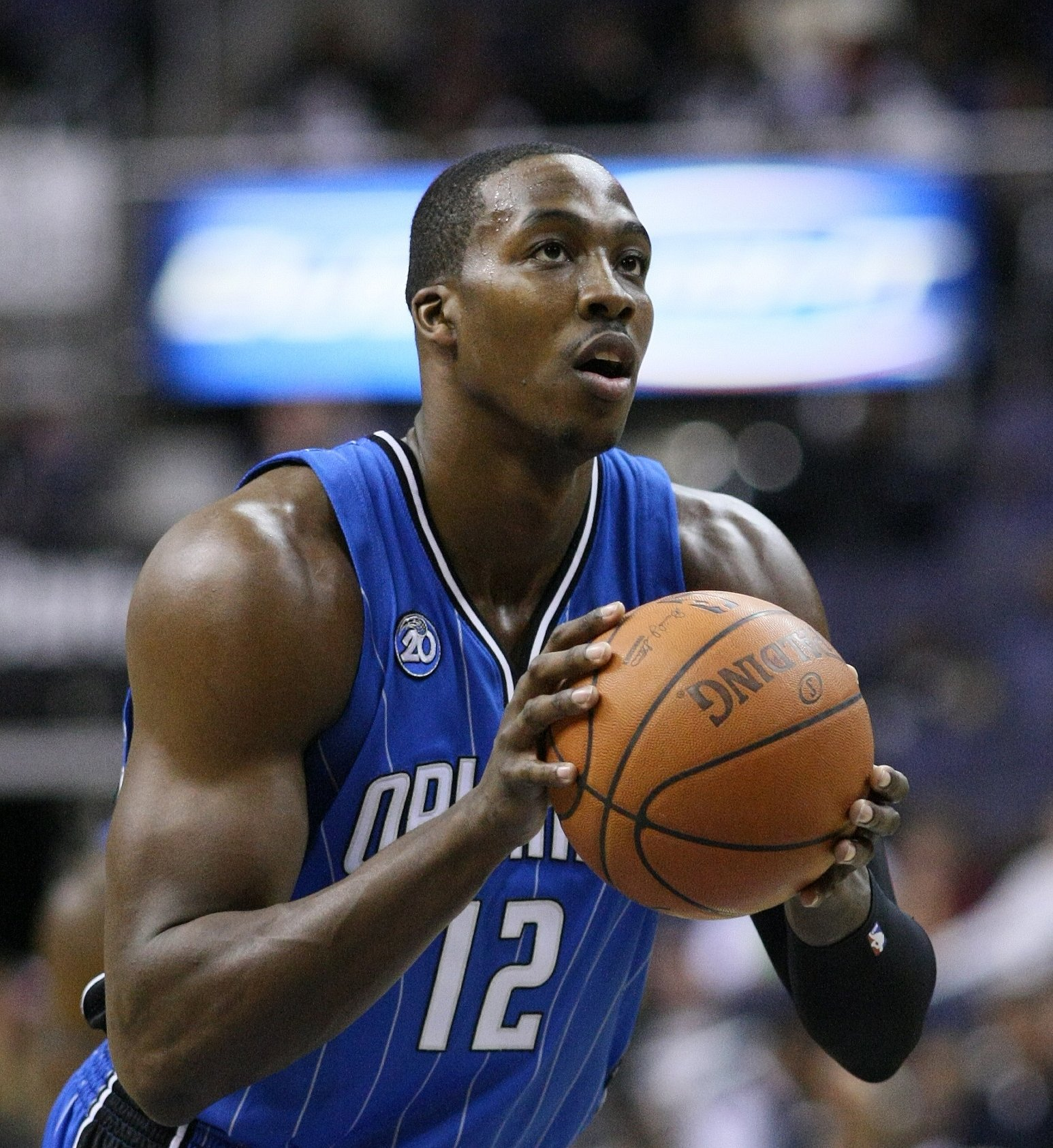
Dwight Howard was drafted No. 1 overall in the 2004 NBA draft.

In the off-season, Weisbrod completely dismantled the team. Though he kept Davis as coach, he shook up the player roster, only keeping a few players from last season. The most significant trade was Tracy McGrady. McGrady, discontent with the Magic, wished to move on; Weisbrod accused McGrady of "slacking off" and not attending practices (McGrady later admitted that he did not give 100 percent during the 2003–04 season and wanted the team to bring him some help, but never wanted to leave Orlando). The Magic traded McGrady along with Reece Gaines, Tyronn Lue, and Juwan Howard to the Houston Rockets for Steve Francis, Kelvin Cato, and Cuttino Mobley. In addition, the Magic acquired center Tony Battie and two second-round draft picks from the Cleveland Cavaliers in exchange for Drew Gooden, Steven Hunter, and the draft rights to Anderson Varejão. The Magic then signed free agent Hedo Türkoğlu. With the number one draft pick, the Magic selected high-school phenomenon and future All-Star and franchise cornerstone Dwight Howard, and a draft-day trade with the Denver Nuggets got them point guard Jameer Nelson.

After a promising 13–6 start, the Magic began to fall apart. First, Weisbrod traded Mobley for Doug Christie from the Sacramento Kings. Christie, because of his emotional ties to the Kings, at first refused to play for the Magic. Later on, Christie claimed he had bone spurs and was placed on the injured list after playing only a few games for the Magic. Near the end of the season, with a playoff-push faltering, Weisbrod fired Davis after leading Davis to believe he was going to be the team's head coach for the entire 2004–05 NBA season. He then promoted Chris Jent to interim head coach. Throughout the season, bolstered by Hill's return, the Magic played spectacularly, defeating top NBA teams. However, led by the erratic play of Francis, the Magic also lost to league teams with losing records. Howard showed great promise, becoming one of the few players to average a double-double. Howard was a consistent rebounder and scorer, becoming the first rookie to start and play all 82 games in a season. In addition, Nelson, after a slow start, developed into a talented player, taking over the starting point guard position. Hill also returned and averaged 19.7 points a game. Hill was chosen an All-Star starter by NBA fans for the 2005 All-Star Game, and Dwight Howard and Jameer Nelson were named to the All-Rookie first and second teams, respectively. Howard was a unanimous selection.

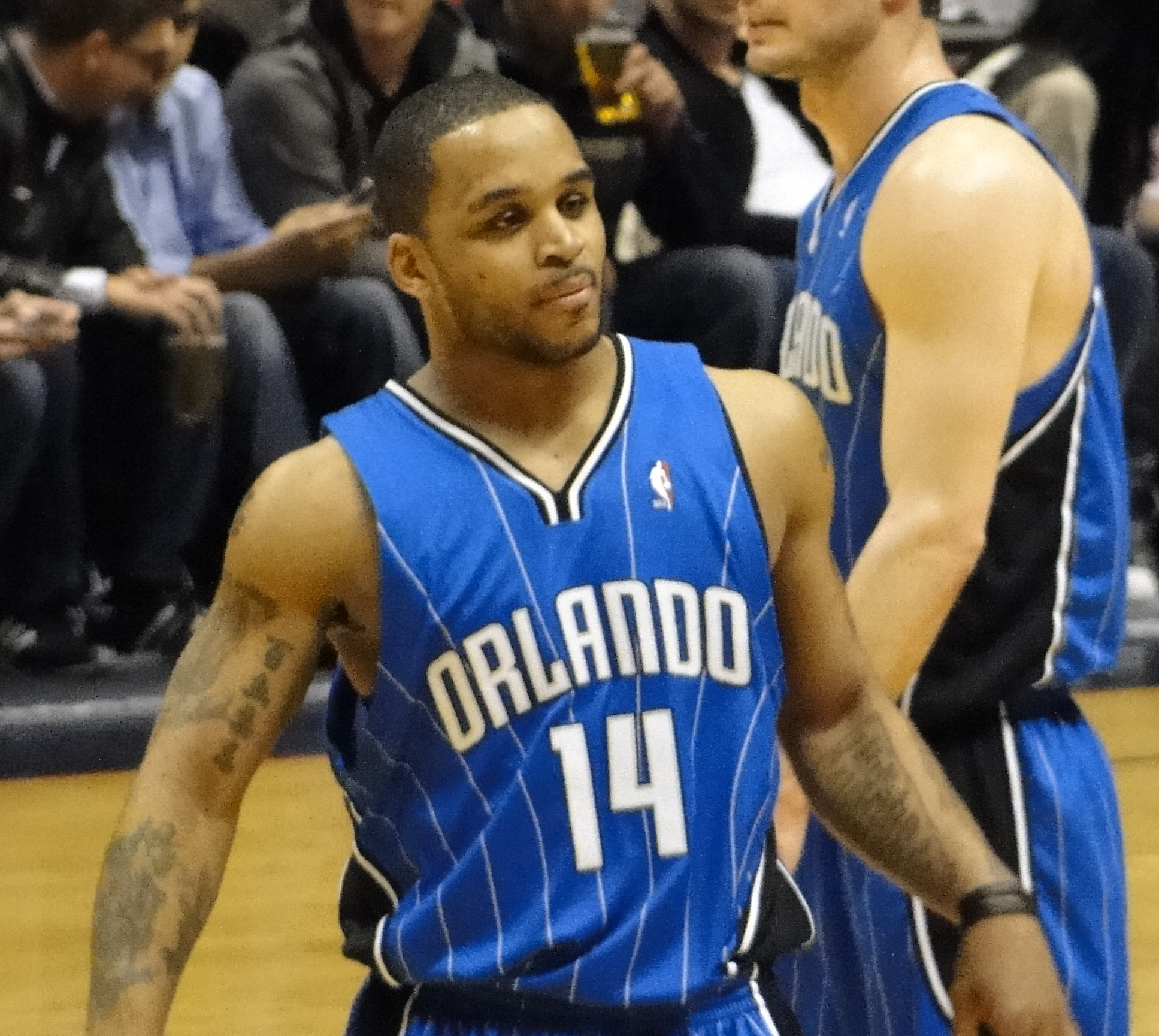
Jameer Nelson spent 10 seasons with Orlando from 2004 to 2014.

The Magic finished the season 36–46. Their playoff push was hampered by injuries in the last quarter of the season: a season-ending broken wrist for sixth man Hedo Türkoğlu, a shin injury to Grant Hill, a rib cage injury to Nelson, and a three-game suspension to Francis for kicking a photographer. The Magic ended a few games out of the playoffs. On May 23, 2005, the Magic's plans were disrupted by the abrupt resignation of general manager and Chief Operating Officer John Weisbrod. In addition, the Magic announced the following day that Brian Hill, the coach who led the Magic to the NBA Finals under O'Neal and Hardaway, would return as head coach.

The Magic drafted Fran Vázquez with the 11th pick in the 2005 NBA draft. On July 28, 2005, Vazquez stunned the team after announcing that he would remain in Spain to play for Akasvayu Girona, getting ridiculed by media after he was quoted that the decision to stay was made by his girlfriend. Owner Rich DeVos announced on October 21 that he was transferring ownership to his children, with the official owner role moving to son-in-law and team president Bob Vander Weide. The transfer was supposed to be complete by the end of the year.

The 2005–06 season opened with high hopes for the Magic despite not being able to add first-round draft pick Vasquez. Grant Hill was supposedly finally healed from his multiple ankle surgeries. Dwight Howard and Jameer Nelson showed excellent progress during summer-league play. Second-round draft pick Travis Diener showed excellent shooting and decision-making during the summer. And the free-agent signing of Keyon Dooling showed that the club was going to continue making progress. Then trouble began. Hill, despite his ankle apparently being healed, suffered a painful sports hernia injury that would hamper his play throughout the entire season. After playing in three preseason games, he underwent surgery to correct the hernia and would not appear during the regular season until mid-December, to which he lasted a month before attempting to make another comeback in February and early March, however, he only played sporadically. Then a foot injury to Nelson forced him to sit out for over a month.

On February 15, 2006, the Magic announced that they had acquired Darko Miličić and Carlos Arroyo from the Detroit Pistons in exchange for Kelvin Cato and a 2007 top-five protected first-round draft pick. One week later, on February 22, the Magic announced that they had traded Steve Francis to the New York Knicks in exchange for Penny Hardaway (whom they waived two days later) and Trevor Ariza. With a set starting rotation of Battie, Howard, Türkoğlu, DeShawn Stevenson, and Nelson, the Magic mounted a surprising run at the eighth playoff spot in the Eastern Conference, including an 8-game winning streak and 12 consecutive home wins. The streak included wins against NBA powerhouses Detroit, San Antonio, Dallas and Miami, as well as a game against the Philadelphia 76ers in which Howard recorded 28 points and a career-high 26 rebounds. Despite their efforts they did not make the playoffs.

==== 2006–2010: Return to the NBA Finals ====
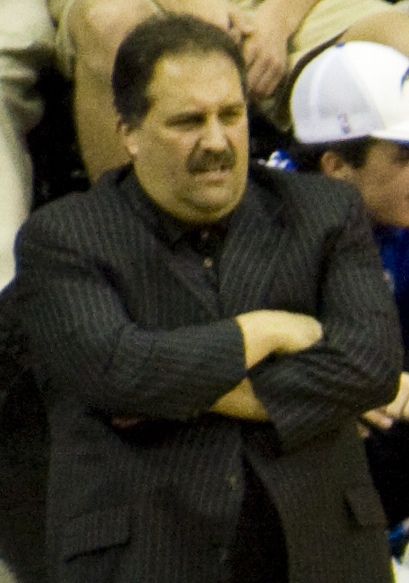
Head coach Stan Van Gundy

With the 11th overall pick in the 2006 NBA draft, the Magic took former Duke star JJ Redick. Even with the fan support to get him playing time he averaged just over 11 minutes a game. After beginning the season strong with a 13–4 record, the Orlando Magic began to suffer in the standings as the result of multiple losses, due in large part to the injuries of Tony Battie, Keyon Dooling, and Grant Hill. The Magic were also hampered with the sporadic play of many of their young stars, who on multiple occasions showed their propensity for streaky shooting and the team's lack of a solid scoring two-guard. Despite the team's poor play, Dwight Howard continued to develop and blossom in his third year in the league, culminating in his first selection to the Eastern Conference All-Star team. The final few weeks of the season saw the Magic build momentum and confidence with an impressive late push towards the Playoffs. On April 15, 2007, with an 88–86 victory over the Boston Celtics, the Magic secured its first berth in the NBA playoffs since 2003 by locking up the eighth seed in the Eastern Conference. This marked the first time that the team had made the playoffs while posting a losing record. Nevertheless, their Playoff run ended on April 28, 2007, after they were swept in the first round by first seeded Detroit Pistons whose experience, veteran leadership and ability to consistently make the clutch basket proved far too much for the undermanned and overwhelmed Magic to overcome. It was announced on May 23, 2007, that Brian Hill had been fired as head coach of the Magic.

On June 1, 2007, the Magic signed Billy Donovan to be their head coach for five years. The next day, Donovan wished to be released from the contract and the Magic agreed several days later. On June 6, 2007, the Magic signed a 4-year contract with Stan Van Gundy. In the free agent market, the Magic signed Rashard Lewis of the Seattle SuperSonics to a six-year league-maximum contract believed to be worth over $110 million. At the NBA China Games, the Magic swept the three games in China, twice against the Cleveland Cavaliers and once against the Chinese national team in games held in Shanghai and in Macau.

On November 15, 2007, Bob Vander Weide, the son-in-law of Richard DeVos, officially took over as owner of the team, although ownership is still split evenly amongst Richard DeVos' other children as well.

The Magic started the 2007–08 NBA season with an impressive 16–4 record in their first 20 games, which included wins over the Boston Celtics and Cleveland Cavaliers. Through the next few months, the Magic were not so successful, splitting their next 36 games with 18 wins and 18 losses. At the start of March, the Magic seemed to pick up speed again, finishing the month with 10 wins, the first time since November that they won 10 or more in a month. The Magic clinched the Southeast Division title when the Washington Wizards were routed at Utah 129–87 on March 31, 2008. It was the Magic's third division title, but only their first since 1995–96 season, as well as their first since the Southeast Division was formed. They also earned their 50th win of the season against the Chicago Bulls on April 13, which had not happened since the 1995–96 season. The Magic finished the regular season 52–30, their best season since 1995–96. With the third seed in the Eastern Conference, they were matched up in their first-round playoff series against the Toronto Raptors. The Magic had home-court advantage for the first time since the 1998–99 season.

On April 28, 2008, at Amway Arena, the Magic eliminated the Raptors with a 4–1 series victory in the first round. It was the first playoff series victory for the Magic in 12 years after 6 straight first-round exits. The run of success did not last long as they fell 4–1 to the experienced Detroit Pistons in the second round. With the Magic already down in the series, controversy erupted after the Pistons' Game 2 victory. At the conclusion of the third quarter, Chauncey Billups of the Pistons made a three-point shot giving the Pistons a three-point lead. However, the clock had stopped just as the play began. NBA rules prohibit officials from using instant replay or any timing device to determine how much time has elapsed when a clock malfunctions, nor is a replay allowed to be viewed from the time of the malfunction to when the play ends, when the game clock has not expired. Because of the rule, the officials then estimated that the play took 4.6 seconds, and because there were 5.1 seconds remaining when play began, the field goal was allowed to be counted. The NBA later admitted that the play actually took 5.7 seconds and the basket in question should not have counted. The Pistons went on to win Game 2. The Magic were able to win Game 3, with the Pistons' Chauncey Billups out for most of the game with an injury but were unable to take advantage of his absence and defeat the Pistons in Games 4 and 5, which ended the Magic's playoff run in 2008. Another highlight of the season was Hedo Turkoglu winning Most Improved Player.

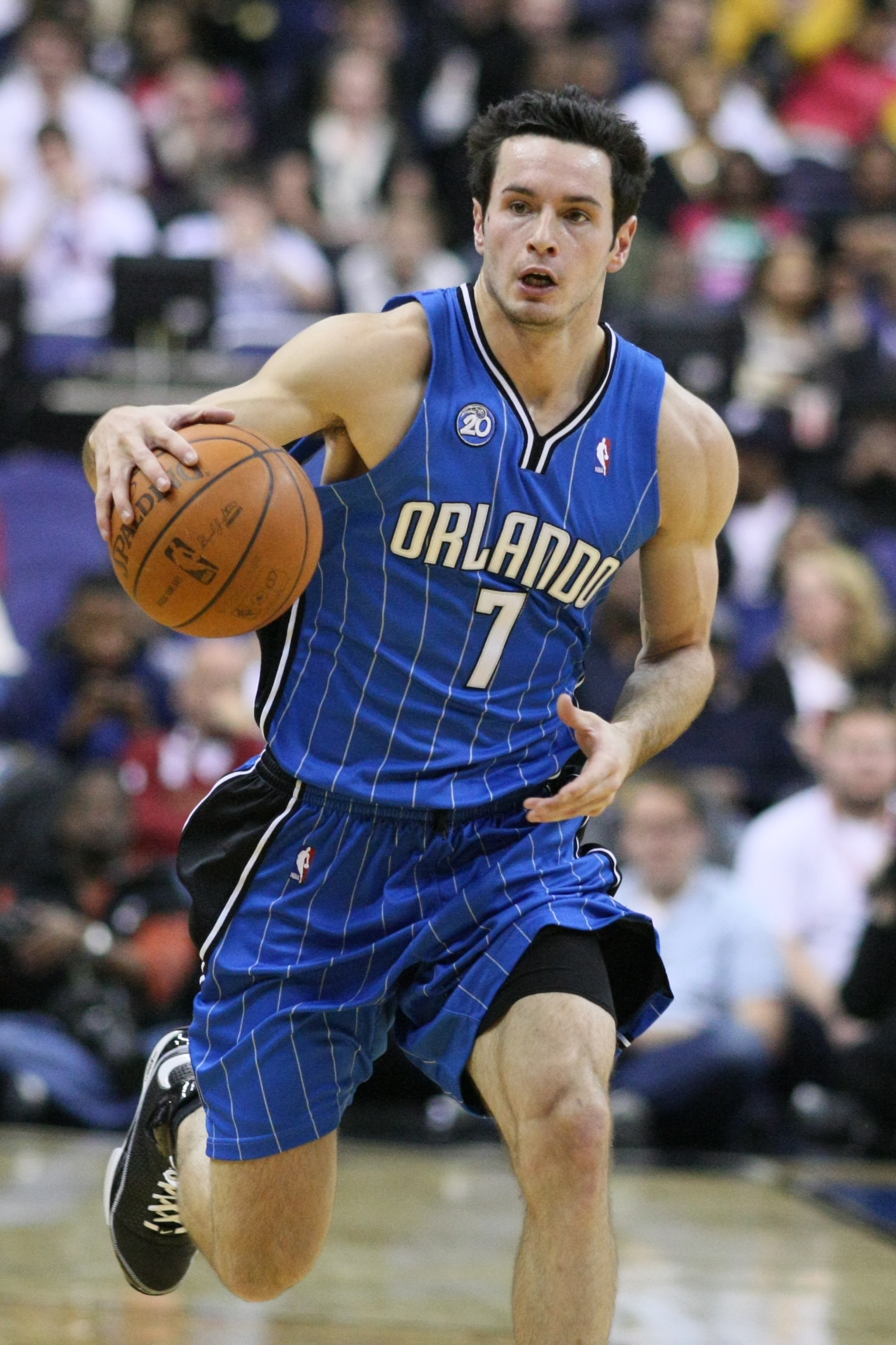
JJ Redick in 2008

The first half of the 2008–09 season went very well for the Magic. After 41 games, the Magic were 33–8, leading the Southeast Division, as well as having one of the top four records in the league. At the start of February, Jameer Nelson, their all-star starting point guard, went down with a shoulder injury. He was expected to miss the remainder of the season. After trading for Rafer Alston, the Magic finished the regular season with a 59–23 record, it was the most games the team had won in a season since the 1995–96 season in which they had 60 wins. In the playoffs, the Magic beat the Philadelphia 76ers in the first round of the playoffs and then the defending champions, the Boston Celtics, in the Eastern Conference semifinals, behind assistant coach Patrick Ewing's guarantee that they would win Game 7 of that series. In their first conference finals since 1996, the Magic beat the Cleveland Cavaliers, which were led by the season's MVP, LeBron James. After dropping the first two games in the Finals against the Los Angeles Lakers, the Magic finally won their first-ever game in the Finals in Game 3. Despite Nelson's return to the team for the Finals, the Lakers won the series and the championship by beating the Magic in five games.

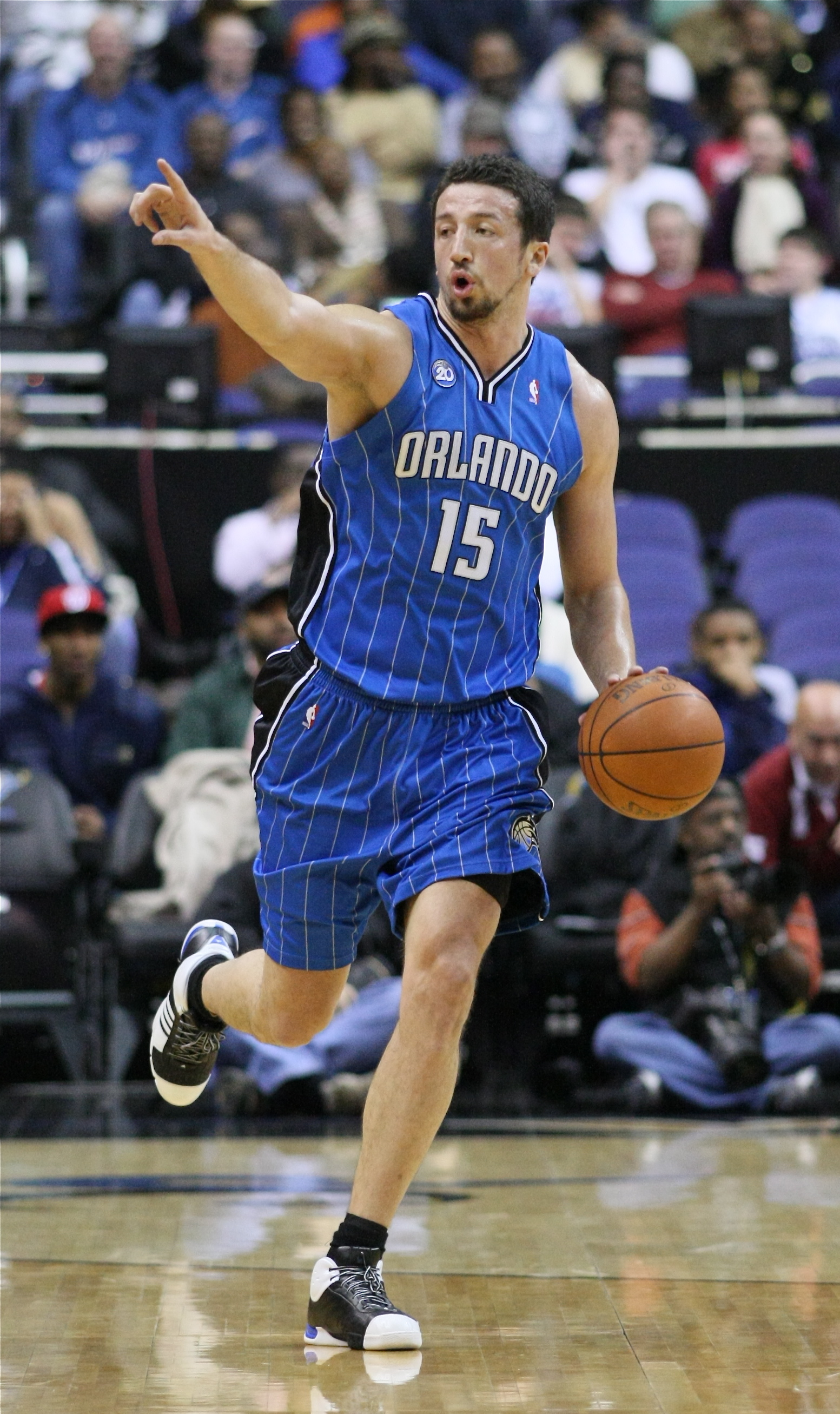
2007-08 Most Improved Player Hedo Türkoğlu in 2008

In the 2009 off-season, Orlando traded Rafer Alston, Tony Battie, and Courtney Lee to the New Jersey Nets in exchange for eight-time All-Star Vince Carter and Ryan Anderson. Hedo Türkoğlu, as part of a sign-and-trade, was sent to the Toronto Raptors. They then made several free agent signings. On July 10, former Dallas Mavericks power forward Brandon Bass was given a 4-year deal. On July 21, the Magic signed former Phoenix Suns forward Matt Barnes. On August 19, they signed former Miami Heat point guard Jason Williams, who decided to come back after a year in retirement.

On September 28, 2009, Orlando extended the contract of head coach Stan Van Gundy by exercising his option for the 2010–11 season. They did the same for general manager Otis Smith, which would keep him in that position through the 2011–12 season.

The Magic were without Rashard Lewis for the first 10 games of the 2009–10 season. Lewis tested positive for an elevated testosterone level that was caused by an over-the-counter supplement containing a substance banned by the league. To make matters worse, Vince Carter suffered a left ankle injury in just the second game of the season. Carter's injury turned out to be not too serious, but caused him to miss the next five games. Another setback came in mid-November, when Jameer Nelson injured his left knee, which required arthroscopic surgery to repair. Nelson would be out for five weeks. Despite all of this, the Magic had a 23–8 record at the end of December.

Orlando lost seven of their first ten games in January but recovered well enough to post a winning record for the month by winning six of their next seven. Following the All-Star break, the Magic went on a roll, winning 23 of their 28 remaining games, clinching their fourth consecutive playoff berth and winning their third consecutive division championship in the process. The Magic finished the regular season with a 59–23 record, matching their record from the 2008–09 season, and finishing with not only the second-best record in the Eastern Conference, but the second-best record in the entire league. The team became one of the only teams in NBA history to beat all of the other 29 teams at least once during the regular season. The Magic swept the Charlotte Bobcats and the Atlanta Hawks in the first two rounds of the playoffs, respectively. They then faced the Boston Celtics in the conference finals. After losing the first three games of the series, Orlando managed to win the next two games, but lost on the road in Game 6, ending their season.

==== 2010–2012: "Dwightmare" saga ====
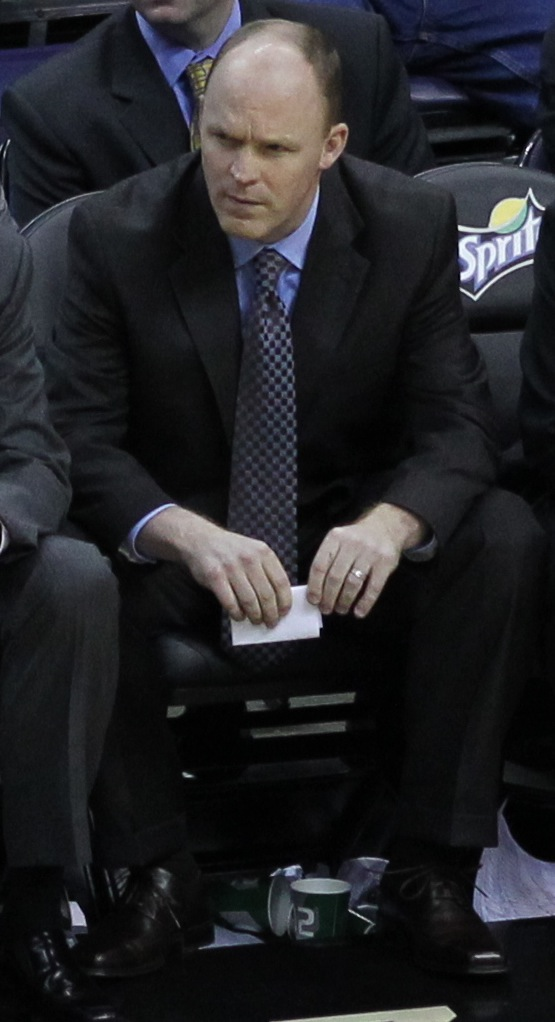
Scott Skiles coached the Magic in the 2015–16 season.

In anticipation of the team's move to Amway Center, the Magic updated its logo. They retained the streaking ball logo, but changed the wordmark taken from their current uniforms. The Magic hosted the NBA All-Star Game in 2012. The Magic also unveiled black alternate uniforms.

In the summer of 2010, the Orlando Magic signed Chris Duhon, formerly of the New York Knicks, and Quentin Richardson, formerly of the Miami Heat.

On December 18, 2010, having lost five of their last six games, the Magic made a blockbuster trade deal with the Phoenix Suns and the Washington Wizards. They traded Vince Carter, Marcin Gortat and Mickaël Piétrus to Phoenix for Hedo Türkoğlu (who led them into the 2009 NBA Finals when they lost 4–1 against the Los Angeles Lakers), Jason Richardson and Earl Clark. Rashard Lewis was traded to Washington for 3-time All-Star Gilbert Arenas.

The Magic finished the season with 52 victories, good for second in the Southeast Division. But they were ousted in six games by the Atlanta Hawks in the first round of the 2011 NBA playoffs, the first time head coach Stan Van Gundy was eliminated early in the playoffs.

In a lockout-shortened 2011–12 season, the Magic started the off-season on a rocky note, with their All-Star center, Dwight Howard, requesting a trade to either the New Jersey Nets, Los Angeles Lakers, or Dallas Mavericks. Overlooking the trade request the Magic did a sign and trade with the Boston Celtics for Glen Davis and Von Wafer in exchange for Brandon Bass. The Magic also amnestied Gilbert Arenas and signed Larry Hughes, Justin Harper, and DeAndre Liggins. The Magic started the season on Christmas Day in Oklahoma City against the Thunder. They lost the season opener 97–89. During the month of February, the Magic waived Hughes and signed Ish Smith. On February 26, Orlando hosted the 2012 All-Star Game. The Magic struggled to win games consistently, with concerns about the uncertainty of Dwight Howard's future with the franchise. However, after Dwight rescinded his trade demand and signed a one-year deal in March, the Magic seemed to find their footing again. But then in early April, shortly after it became public that Howard requested coach Van Gundy to be replaced, the center was diagnosed with a herniated disk and forced to have back surgery, thus ending his season. The Magic clinched the sixth seed in the east with a 37–29 record. The Magic were faced with the third-seeded Pacers in the first round. Despite winning the first game of the series the Magic were defeated 4–1.

On May 21, 2012, it was reported that general manager Otis Smith and head coach Stan Van Gundy would part ways with the organization. Stan Van Gundy finished with a 259–135 regular season record with the team which included making the playoffs in those five years and a conference championship.

CEO Alex Martins announced former Oklahoma City assistant general manager Rob Hennigan as the new general manager for the Orlando Magic on June 20, 2012. Once hired, he became the youngest general manager in the league.

In the 2012 NBA draft, the Magic selected Andrew Nicholson and Kyle O'Quinn.

On June 25, 2012, Dwight Howard had face-to-face meetings with general manager Rob Hennigan in Los Angeles and demanded a trade to the Brooklyn Nets.

On July 9, 2012, the Magic completed a sign-and-trade deal with the New Orleans Hornets, that sent forward Ryan Anderson to the Hornets. In return the Magic received center Gustavo Ayon.

On July 28, 2012, Jacque Vaughn was named the new head coach. He had been the assistant coach for the San Antonio Spurs for the last two seasons.

On August 9, 2012, ESPN reported that a four-team trade would send Dwight Howard to the Los Angeles Lakers. Marc Stein of ESPN.com was told the Lakers were to acquire Howard, Chris Duhon and Earl Clark, the Denver Nuggets were to acquire Andre Iguodala, the Philadelphia 76ers were to acquire Andrew Bynum and Jason Richardson, and the Magic were to acquire Arron Afflalo, Al Harrington, Nikola Vučević, Maurice Harkless, Josh McRoberts, Christian Eyenga, and five total protected future (three first-round, two second-round) picks from each of the other three teams. The deal was officially confirmed and completed on August 10. Howard left the Magic as their all-time leading scorer, shot blocker, and rebounder.

=== 2012–2021: Struggles with Nikola Vucevic ===
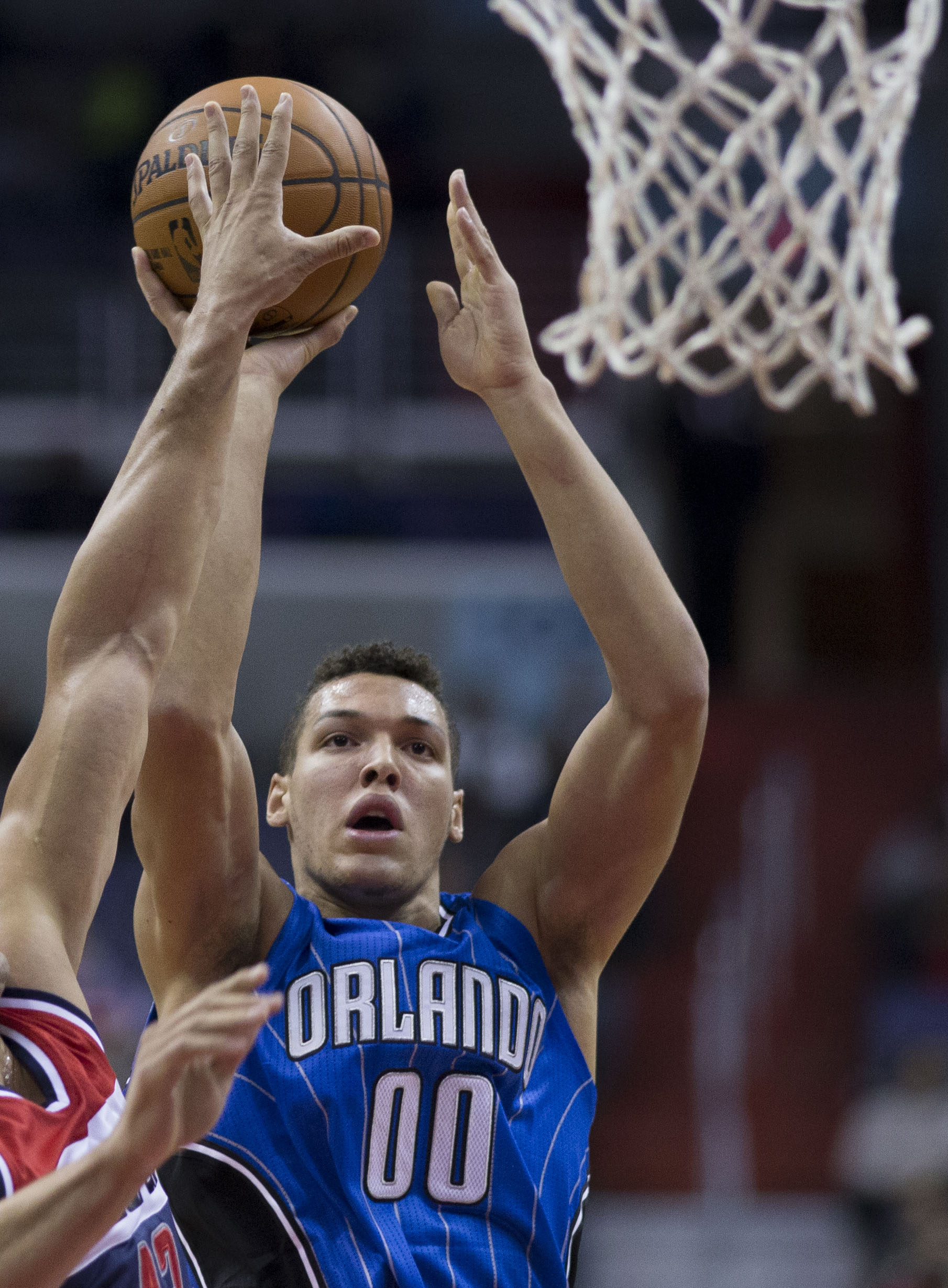
Aaron Gordon was selected by the Magic in the 2014 NBA draft.

==== 2012–2017: Rob Hennigan era ====
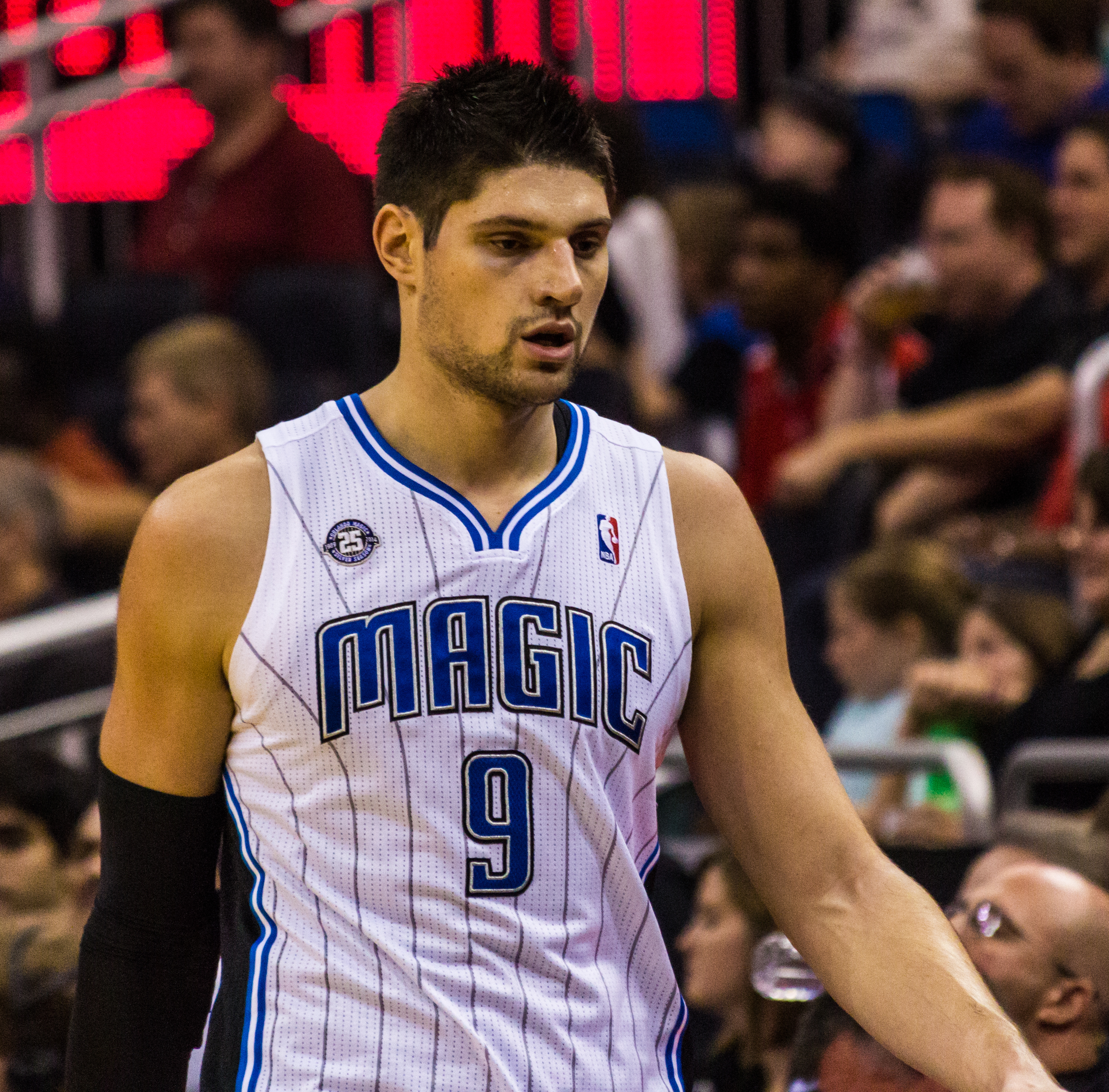
Nikola Vučević playing for the Magic

Following the trade of Dwight Howard, the Magic entered into a state of rebuilding with Maurice Harkless and Nikola Vučević. On August 29, the Magic signed free agent guard E'Twaun Moore. On December 2, 2012, Howard's first game against his former team, the Magic defeated the Lakers 113–103.

On February 21, 2013, the Magic traded JJ Redick, Ish Smith and Gustavo Ayón to the Milwaukee Bucks. In return, the Magic received Beno Udrih, Tobias Harris and rookie Doron Lamb. The Magic also traded Josh McRoberts to the Charlotte Bobcats for Hakim Warrick who was waived 2 days later. The Magic finish the 2012–13 season 20–62 as the worst record in the NBA, missing the playoffs for the first time since 2006.

On June 27, 2013, the Orlando Magic had the second pick in the first round of the 2013 NBA draft. The Magic used their lottery pick to draft Big Ten Defensive Player of the Year, shooting guard Victor Oladipo from Indiana University. The Magic also had the 51st pick in the second round of the NBA draft. They used this pick to draft forward Romero Osby from the University of Oklahoma. Osby averaged 16 points, seven rebounds, and 1.3 assists during his senior NCAA season at Oklahoma but was cut by the Magic before the season opener.

The Magic finished the 2013–14 season with a 23–59 record, third worst in the NBA. The draft lottery gave them the fourth pick in the 2014 NBA draft. In the draft, they selected Aaron Gordon with the fourth pick and Dario Šarić with the 12th pick. Saric was then swapped for the 10th pick, Elfrid Payton in exchange for a 2017 first round pick and a future second round pick. Roy Devyn Marble was selected with the 56th pick in the second round. On February 5, 2015, Jacque Vaughn was relieved of his head coaching duties after coaching 2 1/2 seasons for the Magic. His overall record was 58–158. He was replaced by interim head coach James Borrego.

On May 29, 2015, the Magic hired their former point guard Scott Skiles as the franchise's 12th head coach.

On June 25, 2015, in the 2015 NBA draft, Orlando selected Mario Hezonja with the fifth overall pick and Tyler Harvey with the 51st overall pick. On February 16, 2016, the Magic traded Tobias Harris to the Detroit Pistons in exchange for Ersan İlyasova and Brandon Jennings.

On May 12, 2016, Skiles stepped down as head coach of the Orlando Magic. On May 19, the Orlando Magic agreed to a deal with former Indiana Pacers coach Frank Vogel to become the next head coach of the team.

With Vogel as their new coach, the Magic made many changes to their roster during the off-season. On June 23, 2016, in the 2016 NBA draft the Magic selected Domantas Sabonis 11th overall, but then traded Sabonis and shooting guard Victor Oladipo for defensive power forward Serge Ibaka of the Oklahoma City Thunder. During free agency the Magic re-signed Evan Fournier to a five-year, $85 million contract and also signed Bismack Biyombo, Jeff Green, and D. J. Augustin. On July 15, C. J. Wilcox was acquired, along with cash considerations, from the Clippers in exchange for Devyn Marble and a future second round draft pick.

On February 14, 2017, Ibaka was traded to the Toronto Raptors in exchange for Terrence Ross and a future first-round draft pick. The Magic finished the 2016–17 season with the third worst record in their conference, finishing 29–53.

==== 2017–2022: Jeff Weltman era ====
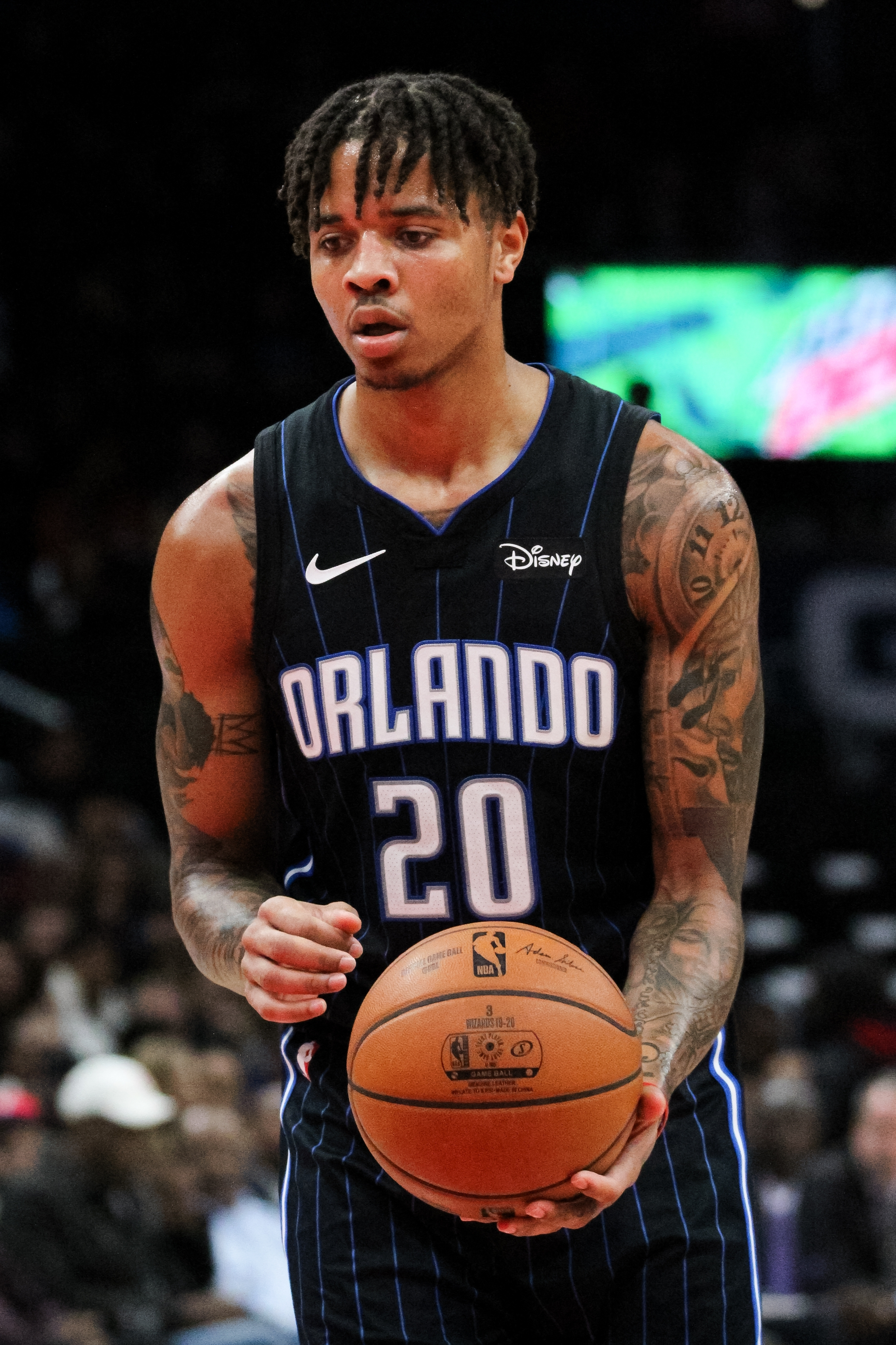
Markelle Fultz playing for the Magic

In the summer of 2017, the Magic made various changes, the first being the firing of general manager Rob Hennigan on April 13. On May 23, the Magic named Jeff Weltman, the former general manager of the Toronto Raptors, as president of basketball operations and named John Hammond, the former general manager for the Milwaukee Bucks, as the new general manager. With the sixth overall pick in the 2017 NBA draft, Orlando drafted Florida State forward, Jonathan Isaac. During free agency the Magic signed Jonathon Simmons, Arron Afflalo, Shelvin Mack, Marreese Speights, Khem Birch and Adreian Payne.

On October 6, 2017, the Magic announced that former superstar Tracy McGrady, had rejoined the team as assistant to the CEO.

On February 8, 2018, the Magic traded starting point guard Elfrid Payton to the Phoenix Suns in exchange for a 2018 second-round pick.

On April 12, 2018, head coach Frank Vogel was fired by the Magic after the conclusion of the 2017–18 regular season. On May 30, the Magic named Steve Clifford as their new head coach.

On June 21, 2018, the Magic drafted center Mohamed Bamba with the sixth overall pick. and Melvin Frazier in the second round. Other player acquisitions included trading for Timofey Mozgov and Jerian Grant in a three-team trade for Bismack Biyombo, Jarell Martin in a trade from the Memphis Grizzlies, and free agent Isaiah Briscoe.

On September 6, 2018, team owner Richard DeVos died aged 92 from complications from an infection.

During the 2018–19 season, the Magic won their sixth division title and finished in seventh place in the Eastern Conference to clinch a playoff berth for the first time since the 2011–12 season. Mohamed Bamba was diagnosed with stress fracture on February 5, 2019, and eventually missed the remainder of the season. At the NBA trade deadline, the Magic traded Jonathon Simmons and two draft picks to the Philadelphia 76ers for Markelle Fultz. Nikola Vučević was selected as a reserve for the 2019 Eastern Conference All Star Team, being the first Orlando Magic All Star player since Dwight Howard in 2012. In March 2019, the Magic signed former NBA Rookie of the Year Michael Carter-Williams to two ten-day contracts before signing him to a one-year deal. The Magic were matched up against the Toronto Raptors in the first round of the 2019 NBA playoffs. While the Magic won their first playoff game in seven years, the Raptors won the series in five games.

In the 2019 NBA draft the Magic selected Chuma Okeke with the 16th overall pick, and traded its second-round pick to the Los Angeles Lakers in exchange for $2.2 million and a future draft pick. With the prospect of limited playing time due to injury, the Magic and Okeke agree to sign a one-year deal with the Magic's G League affiliate in Lakeland and sign Okeke's rookie contract in the summer of 2020. During the 2019 free agency, the Magic re-signed with Vučević, Terrence Ross, Michael Carter-Williams, and Birch, signed free agent Al-Farouq Aminu, and waived Mozgov. The Magic compiled a 30–35 record before the league suspended its season on March 11, 2020, due to the COVID-19 pandemic. Following the suspension of the season, the Magic were one of the 22 teams invited to the NBA Bubble to participate in the final eight seeding games of the regular season. Season ending injuries to Jonathan Isaac and Mo Bamba, along with significant injuries to Terrence Ross and Evan Fournier hampered their performance and they went 3–5 in the seeding games, but the team earned the eighth playoff spot in the Eastern Conference to face the Milwaukee Bucks. While the Magic won the opening game, Milwaukee won the next four ending the Magic's season in round one for the second year in a row.

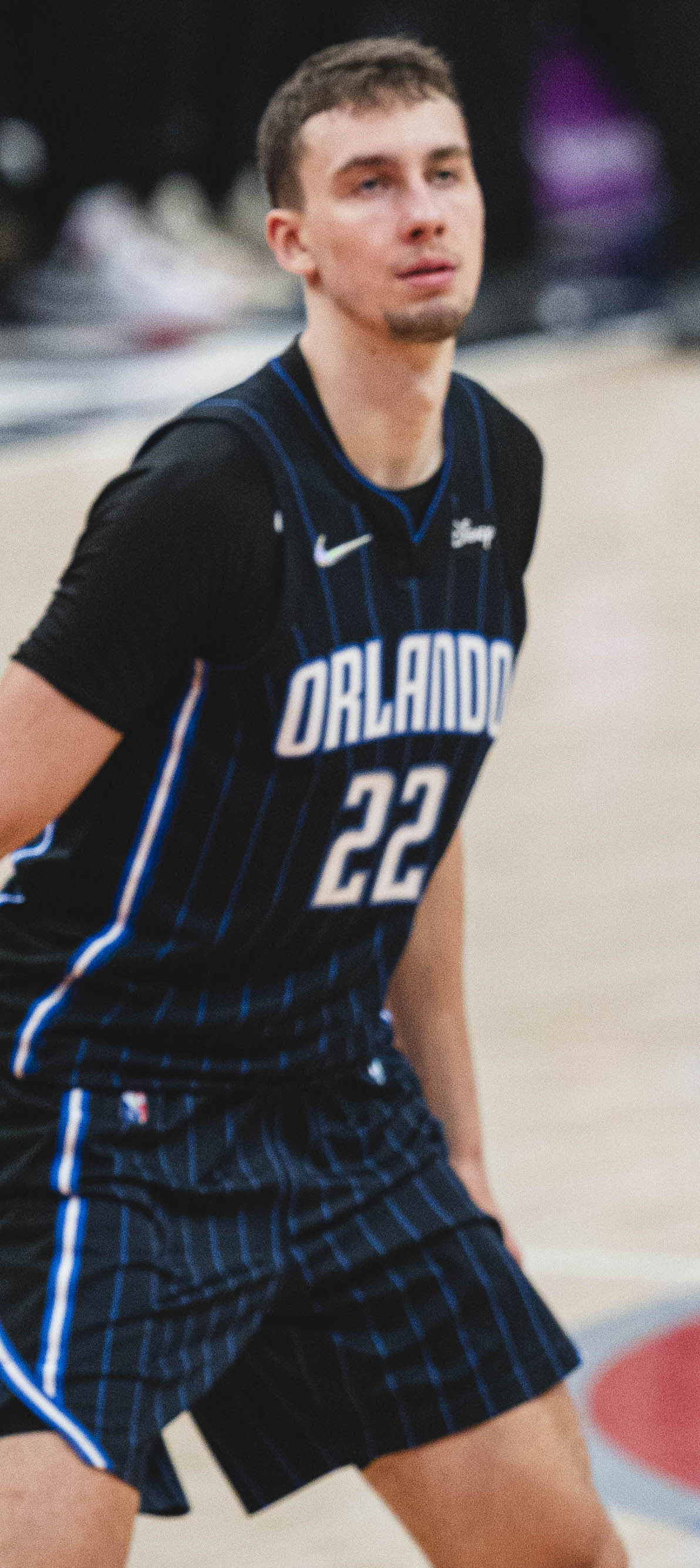
Franz Wagner in 2022

In the 2020 NBA draft the Magic selected Cole Anthony with the 15th overall pick. The shortened free agency period followed where the Magic signed their 2019 draft pick Chuma Okeke, re-signed James Ennis, Michael Carter-Williams, and Gary Clark, while adding Dwayne Bacon. The injury Jonathan Isaac suffered during the previous season was significant enough that he was ruled out for the entire 2020–21 season. In the eighth game of the 2020–21 season, starting point guard, Markelle Fultz went down with an ACL tear in a game against the Cleveland Cavaliers. After the season-ending injury, rookie point guard, Cole Anthony would fill the starting point guard role. On January 20, 2021, Fultz underwent surgery. At the 2021 NBA trade deadline the Magic traded away Nikola Vučević, Aaron Gordon, and Evan Fournier, each to different teams, in what has been viewed as the beginning of another rebuilding period. At the end of the season, the team and Clifford mutually agreed to part ways.

On July 11, 2021, Jamahl Mosley was named head coach after spending the previous season as an assistant coach with the Dallas Mavericks.

On July 29, 2021, the Magic selected Jalen Suggs with the fifth pick and Franz Wagner with the eighth pick (Acquired via the Chicago Bulls in the Nikola Vučević trade) in the 2021 NBA draft. The Magic also selected Orlando native Jason Preston in the second round and promptly traded him on draft night to the Los Angeles Clippers.

=== 2022–present: The Paolo Banchero era ===
==== 2022–2023: First year of Banchero ====
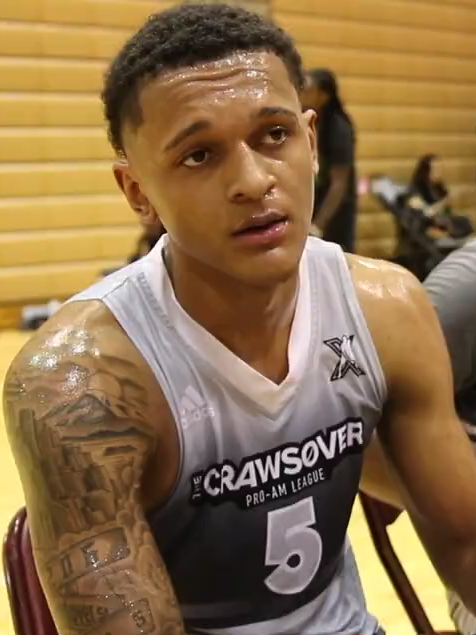
Paolo Banchero was the 1st overall pick in 2022

On June 23, 2022, the Magic selected Paolo Banchero from Duke University with the first pick and Caleb Houstan from the University of Michigan with the 32nd pick in the 2022 NBA draft. Banchero helped the Magic improve their record from 22 wins to 34, averaging 20 points per game and ultimately being chosen as Rookie of the Year.

In August 2022, the team unveiled its new training center, The AdventHealth Training Center.

In May 2023, the Magic donated $50,000 to a super PAC supporting Florida governor Ron DeSantis's 2024 presidential campaign, in what the New York Times called "the first known instance in which an NBA team directly donated to a group allied with a presidential candidate."

On June 22, 2023, the Magic selected Anthony Black from the University of Arkansas with the sixth overall pick and Jett Howard from the University of Michigan with the 11th pick.

On July 5, 2023, the Magic promoted Anthony Parker to general manager (GM) and Pete D'Alessandro to executive vice president (EVP), while Jeff Weltman was promoted to president of basketball operations.

On July 17, 2023, the Magic traded picks with the Phoenix Suns. The Suns received a 2023 second-round pick via the Denver Nuggets, a 2026 second-round pick via the Los Angeles Clippers, and a 2028 second-round pick via the Orlando Magic (protected No. 31-45). In this deal, the Orlando Magic receive unprotected swap rights to the 2026 first-round pick of the Phoenix Suns or Washington Wizards (the Phoenix Suns owe the top of these two picks or theirs already, therefore allowing the Orlando Magic to receive the best of the left-over pick selection spots or keep their own).

==== 2023–present: Playoff rise ====
The 2023–24 season saw the young Orlando Magic rise as a playoff team. Banchero made his first All-Star team as a reserve for the Eastern Conference, becoming the first Magic All-Star since Nikola Vučević in 2021. Jalen Suggs made all defensive-second team. The Magic finished 47–35 as the fifth seed in the Eastern Conference and forced the Cleveland Cavaliers led by Donovan Mitchell to seven games in the first round of the playoffs but lost the series.

The next off-season, the Magic did not re-sign former number one overall pick Markelle Fultz. They drafted Tristan da Silva and traded for the 47th pick which they used to select Antonio Reeves. They also signed Kentavious Caldwell-Pope in free agency, and signed Franz Wagner to a contract extension.

On October 31, 2024, Banchero, suffered a torn right oblique Later, Franz Wagner tore his right oblique and was ruled out indefinitely. The Magic lost both their star forwards to torn obliques. After missing more than two months, Banchero made his return to the Orlando lineup in a 109–106 loss against the Bucks, recording 34 points and seven rebounds.

== Home arenas ==
=== Amway Arena ===
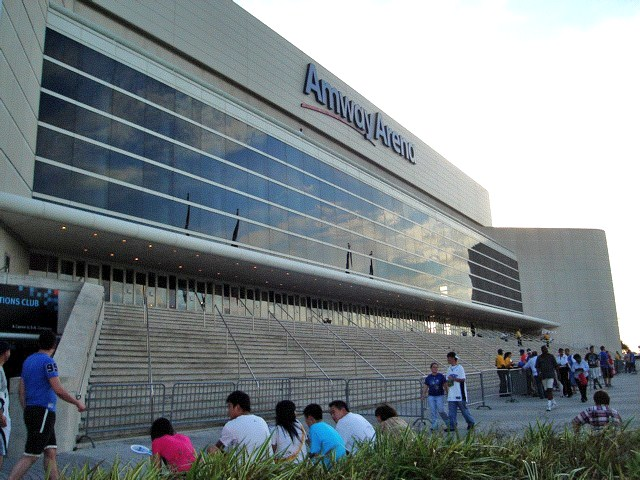
Originally called the Orlando Arena, and later TD Waterhouse Centre, the Amway Arena was the home of the Magic from 1989 to 2010.

Amway Arena opened in 1989 and served as home to the Orlando Magic since their inception until the 2009–10 season. It was originally known as the Orlando Arena, or the "O-Rena", during its first 10 years. In 1999, TD Waterhouse purchased the naming rights and named the venue the TD Waterhouse Centre. In December 2006, the naming rights were purchased by Amway for four years. It is also home of the Arena Football League's Orlando Predators, the Orlando Sharks of the Major Indoor Soccer League, and various sporting and entertainment events. Amway Arena was one of "The Orlando Venues" owned and operated by the City of Orlando. The other facilities include the Bob Carr Performing Arts Centre, Tinker Field, Camping World Stadium, Harry P. Leu Gardens, and Mennello Museum.

=== Kia Center ===
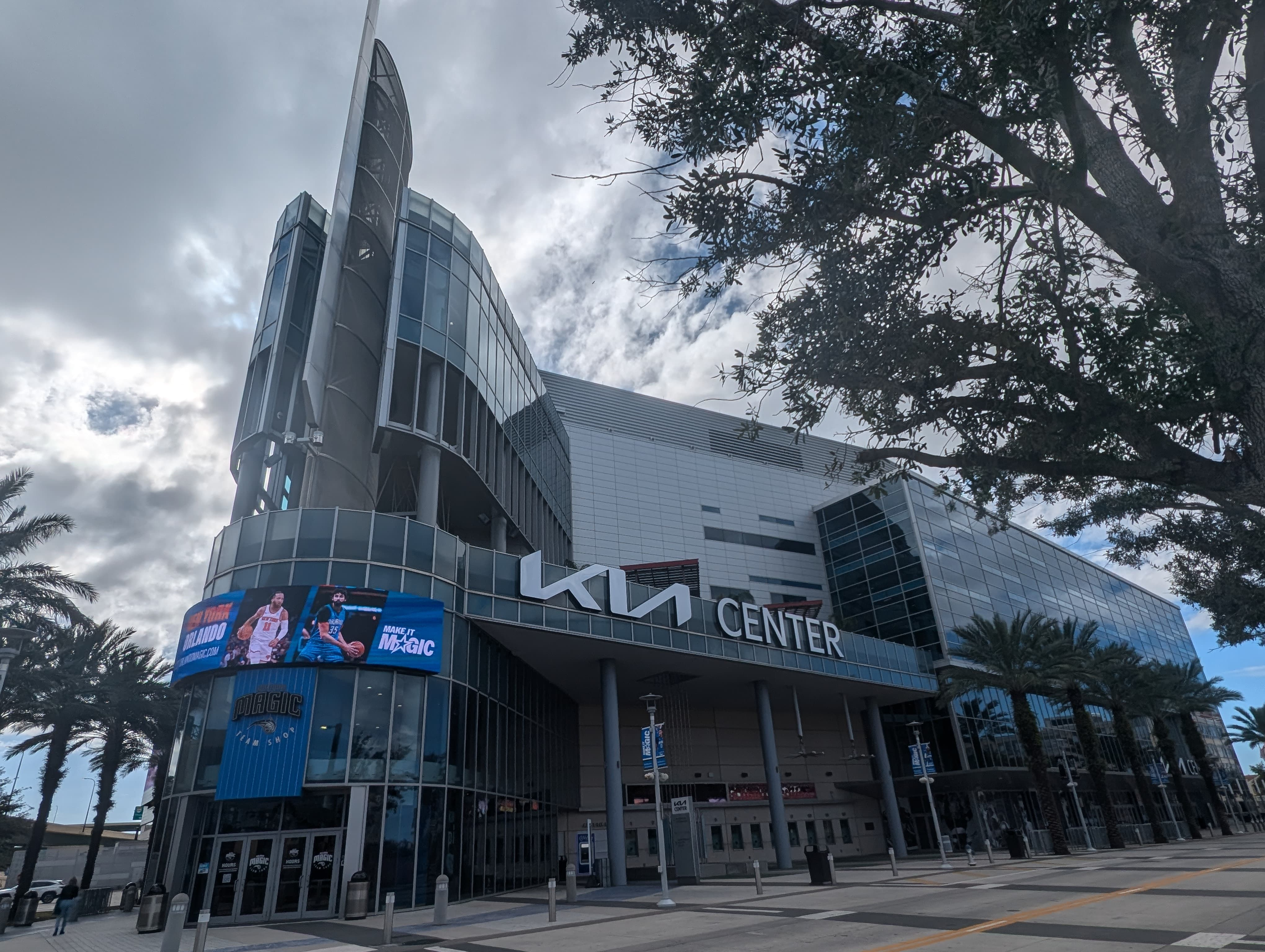
Formerly called Amway Center, Kia Center is the Magic's arena since 2010

The team's current home arena, Kia Center (formerly Amway Center), officially opened on October 1, 2010. The Orlando Magic hosted their first preseason game at Amway Center on October 10 against the New Orleans Hornets. The 2010–11 regular season home opener was on October 28 against the Washington Wizards, and the Magic won both games. In 2012, the Amway Center hosted the All-Star Weekend.

At the time it opened, the new Amway Center was home to the largest Jumbotron in the NBA. The arena also features approximately 2,100 feet (640 m) of digital ribbon boards, and outside the building a 46 feet (14 m) by 53 feet (16 m) video display is visible to motorists traveling on Interstate 4.

On December 20, 2023, Amway Center was formally renamed Kia Center in partnership with Kia America.

Kia Center is also the home of the minor league hockey team, Orlando Solar Bears and the Orlando Predators of the National Arena League (NAL).

== Team identity ==
=== Logos and uniforms ===
==== Original pinstripes (1989–1998) ====
Orlando advertising agency The Advertising Works, led by its president Doug Minear was responsible for the original Magic uniforms. The logo, featuring a basketball crowded by stars and the wordmark "Magic" with a star replacing the A, was created following meetings with Walt Disney World artists and over 5000 suggestions sent from around the country. Stars would remain a primary feature of the logo once it was redesigned in 2000 to feature a comet-like basketball. Pat Williams first suggested the colors black and gold of his alma mater Wake Forest, but this was eschewed for various factors, including the local college UCF using the same scheme. Black would still be the primary color in the scheme used by Minear, a trait shared by 16 other NBA teams. Other colors were an electric blue specially made by sporting goods manufacturer MacGregor, and silver. The home uniforms were white with black pinstripes, featuring black numbers with blue trim, and the road jerseys reversed the scheme while featuring "Orlando" instead of the Magic wordmark. Given the standard mesh nylon worn across the NBA did not allow for pinstripes, the jerseys were made out of durene, a material with cotton on the underside and polyester bonded on the outside. The road uniform was changed to blue with white pinstripes in 1994–95, although the black uniforms remained in use as alternates.

==== Sublimated stars (1998–2003) ====
For the Magic's 10th anniversary in 1998–99, a new look designed by fashion designer Jhane Barnes was unveiled. The pinstripes were relegated to the sides and the uniforms now featured stars as the background. Both jerseys, made out of the dazzle that was used in the Women's National Basketball Association uniforms, had the Magic wordmark, with the home jersey in white and the away in blue. For its first two seasons, the original "streaking ball with stars" logo was placed on the waistline, but after the Magic changed its logo in the 2000–01 season, the new "shooting ball with stars" logo was placed on the left leg.

==== Back to basics (2003–2008) ====
The Magic's 15th anniversary in 2003–04 inspired another uniform revamp, opting for a cleaner look without stripes or stars. The home jerseys were white and featured "Magic" in blue block letters with silver and black trim. The away jersey reverted to the city name in white block letters with silver and black trim and was blue. The logo was placed on either side with thin white and black stripes, and a silver star was placed beneath the collar. During this time, the team's original pinstriped jerseys were worn several times per year as alternates: black in 2003–04 and 2006–07, blue in 2004–05, and white in 2005–06.

==== Pinstripes return (2008–2017) ====
For the 2008–09 season, the Magic have once again introduced new uniforms. The Magic returned to the pinstriped uniforms to commemorate the team's 20th anniversary. The current design combines the elements of the previous three uniform designs the Magic used in its 20-year history. The home jerseys are white with silver pinstripes, while the away jerseys are blue with white pinstripes. The font used for the number and player/team name has also been updated to a more modern look. Magic alternate logos are on the shorts and the back of the jersey. This is the fourth model in franchise history.

As the Magic moved to the Amway Center in 2010, they unveiled a new logo that for the first time fully spelled "Magic", without the star instead of the A. They also unveiled a black alternate uniform, with silver pinstripes, mirroring the regular blue road uniform. A variation of the uniform is also used for Noche Latina every March, with 'Orlando' substituted for 'El Magic', with 'El' in black and silver trim and 'Magic' in blue and silver trim. This was unveiled in the 2011–12 season.

==== Silver sleeves and "Stars" jersey ====
In 2014, Magic unveiled a silver uniform for the first time in their history. It was sleeved, and featuring white pinstripes along with blue, black and white trim for the letters and numbers. Unlike the three other uniforms, a different striping pattern will be used on the sides. In 2016, The Magic unveiled a third alternate uniform, featuring carbon as the primary color and without pinstripes. Named “Stars”, it featured the team's secondary logo and a blue, white and blue tricolor stripe in front, along with white lettering.

==== Nike takes over (2017–2025) ====
The Magic made only a few slight tweaks to their uniforms when Nike became the league's uniform provider in 2017. From 2017 to 2019, the Magic wore white "Association" uniforms, blue "Icon" uniforms and black "Statement" uniforms. With the exception of the black uniforms eliminating the blue side stripes and changing pinstripe colors from silver to blue, the set remained almost identical to the previous Adidas set. Beginning with the 2019–20 season, the black uniform became the "Icon" uniform while a new blue uniform served as the "Statement" uniform. The uniform was inspired from the different sets the Magic wore through the years, such as the silver star and black stripes with white pinstripes from the 1989–98 set, and the cleaner look of the 2003–08 set. This uniform was then tweaked prior to the 2022–23 season, adding black pinstripes (a nod to the 1989–98 uniforms) and black stripes with subtle star patterns (a nod to the 1998–2003 uniforms). Starting in 2020–21, the "Statement" uniforms would feature Jordan Brand's jumpman logo. Their jersey's sponsor is Disney.

==== Homage to the classics (2025–present) ====
Ahead of the 2025–26 season, the Magic unveiled a new logo and uniform set, introducing a modernized version of the "streaking ball with stars" logo that they originally used from 1989 to 2000. The uniforms were also a modern take on the original pinstripe look from 1989 to 1998, bringing back the silver star as a substitute to the "A" on the wordmark. Blue was brought back as the "Icon" uniform base color, while the black "Statement" uniform pays homage to the road warmup gear the Magic wore from 1991 to 1997.

==== City edition: "Stars" ====
An annual "City" edition is also utilized by Nike to honor either local culture or team tradition. The Magic's 2017–18 "City" uniform featured a printed pattern of stars in the sky along with the team's alternate logo in front. For the 2018–19 season, the Magic only made slight changes to their "City" uniform, with the printed pattern of stars relegated to the sides and a predominantly black base.

==== City edition: "Orange" ====
The 2019–20 City uniforms featured an "anthracite" (grey) base with orange lettering. The orange color pays homage to Florida's orange-growing industry. The Magic kept the orange theme for their 2020–21 "City" uniform, this time with a white base and orange letters and numerals with anthracite trim. The uniform also paid homage to the original uniforms worn from 1989 to 1998, featuring "Orl" beside an anthracite star in its original typeface along with orange pinstripes. When the jersey's colors are inverted it shows the exact color scheme used in Orlando's original uniforms. In the 2021–22 season, the Magic again reprised the orange theme for its "City" uniform, this time featuring a few elements from previous uniforms. This uniform would return in the 2025–26 season, but recolored to the current Magic blue and silver scheme.

==== City edition: "Kingdom" ====
For their 2022–23 "City" uniform, the Magic went with a black base, dark gray pinstripes, and gothic-inspired white letters with blue trim to represent the team and the city as a kingdom on the rise. Orlando's "City" uniform for the 2023–24 season featured a Gothic-themed design, attributing to Orlando's pride and resiliency and the Magic's determination to protect its kingdom. The midnight-based jersey incorporated silver stripes meant to evoke a steel cage, along with Gothic script lettering. The Magic's "Kingdom" series was again used for the 2024–25 "City" uniform, with the design similar to last season's "City" uniform but in a platinum base with midnight blue letters.

==== Earned uniforms ====
Having qualified for the 2020 NBA playoffs the previous year, the Magic were also given an "Earned" uniform. The design, which has a white base, featured the alternate logo in front (an homage to the 2016–17 "Stars" alternate and 2017–19 "City" uniform) and blue numbers with black and silver trim. Side panels featured the stars pattern as an homage to the 1998–2003 blue uniforms.

The collection was unified by special silver accents, and the Magic uniform featured these special silver insignias.

==== Classic uniforms ====
The Magic are one of seven teams to wear "Classic" uniforms for the 2018–19 season. As part of their 30th anniversary, the team unveiled the blue pinstriped uniform similar to those worn from 1994 to 1998. To commemorate not only its 35th anniversary season, but also the 25th anniversary of the 1999–2000 "Heart and Hustle" team in 2023–24, the Magic donned the blue "sublimated stars" uniform worn from 1999 to 2003.

=== Mascot ===
Stuff the Magic Dragon has been the Magic's mascot since 1989. A dragon designed by Wade Harrison and Bonnie Erickson of Acme Mascots, Inc, his name is a pun on Puff the Magic Dragon, and how a slam dunk is also known as "stuffing".

== Personnel ==
=== Current roster ===
Orlando Magic roster
Players

Pos.	No.	Player	Height	Weight	DOB	From
F	5	Paolo Banchero (injured)	6 ft 10 in (2.08 m)	250 lb (113 kg)	2002-11-12	Duke
G	3	Desmond Bane	6 ft 6 in (1.98 m)	215 lb (98 kg)	1998-06-25	TCU
F/C	35	Goga Bitadze	6 ft 11 in (2.11 m)	235 lb (107 kg)	1999-07-20	Georgia
G	0	Anthony Black	6 ft 7 in (2.01 m)	212 lb (96 kg)	2004-01-24	Arkansas
F	8	Jamal Cain	6 ft 7 in (2.01 m)	207 lb (94 kg)	1999-03-20	Oakland
G	2	Jevon Carter	6 ft 1 in (1.85 m)	190 lb (86 kg)	1995-09-14	West Virginia
F/C	34	Wendell Carter Jr.	6 ft 10 in (2.08 m)	262 lb (119 kg)	1999-04-16	Duke
C	14	Colin Castleton (TW)	6 ft 11 in (2.11 m)	250 lb (113 kg)	2000-05-25	Florida
F	23	Tristan da Silva	6 ft 8 in (2.03 m)	217 lb (98 kg)	2001-05-15	Colorado
F	1	Jonathan Isaac	6 ft 10 in (2.08 m)	240 lb (109 kg)	1997-10-03	Florida State
G	30	Alex Morales (TW)	6 ft 6 in (1.98 m)	195 lb (88 kg)	1997-11-21	Wagner
F	25	Izaiyah Nelson (injured) (TW)	6 ft 10 in (2.08 m)	218 lb (99 kg)	2003-10-01	South Florida
G/F	93	Noah Penda (injured)	6 ft 7 in (2.01 m)	242 lb (110 kg)	2005-01-07	France
G	11	Jase Richardson	6 ft 2 in (1.88 m)	185 lb (84 kg)	2005-10-16	Michigan State
G	4	Jalen Suggs (injured)	6 ft 5 in (1.96 m)	207 lb (94 kg)	2001-06-03	Gonzaga
C	9	Nikola Vučević	6 ft 11 in (2.11 m)	265 lb (120 kg)	1990-10-24	USC
F	22	Franz Wagner	6 ft 10 in (2.08 m)	230 lb (104 kg)	2001-08-27	Michigan

Coaches
Head coach
- Sean Sweeney
Assistant(s)
- Joe Prunty
- Greg Buckner
- Popeye Jones
- Tom Bialaszewski
- Riley Crean
- Jon Harris
- Ben Johnson
- Jacqlyn Poss
- Mfon Udofia
- D.J. Bakker
- Shannan Lum

Legend
- (DP) Unsigned draft pick
- (FA) Free agent
- (S) Suspended
- (GL) On assignment to G League affiliate
- (TW) Two-way affiliate player
- Injured

Roster
Updated: October 16, 2026

=== Retained draft rights ===
The Magic hold the draft rights to the following unsigned draft picks who have been playing outside the NBA. A drafted player, either an international draftee or a college draftee who is not signed by the team that drafted him, is allowed to sign with any non-NBA teams. In this case, the team retains the player's draft rights in the NBA until one year after the player's contract with the non-NBA team ends. This list includes draft rights that were acquired from trades with other teams.

Draft	Round	Pick	Player	Pos.	Nationality	Current team	Note(s)	Ref
2018	2	43	Justin Jackson	F	Canada	Calgary Surge (Canada)	From the Denver Nuggets	

=== Retired numbers ===
Orlando Magic retired numbers
No.	Player	Position	Tenure	Reference
6 ^{1}	Fans ("The Sixth Man")	—	1989–present	
32	Shaquille O'Neal	C	1992–1996	

Notes:

- ^{1} The number was unretired in the 2001–02 season for Patrick Ewing.
- The NBA retired Bill Russell's No. 6 for all its member teams on August 11, 2022.

=== Basketball Hall of Famers ===
Orlando Magic Hall of Famers
Players
No.	Name	Position	Tenure	Inducted
21	Dominique Wilkins	F	1999	2006
6	Patrick Ewing ^{1}	C	2001–2002	2008
32	Shaquille O'Neal	C	1992–1996	2016
1	Tracy McGrady	G	2000–2004	2017
33	Grant Hill	F	2000–2007	2018
4	Ben Wallace	C/F	1999–2000	2021
15	Vince Carter	G/F	2009–2010	2024
12	Dwight Howard ^{3}	C	2004-2012	2025
Coaches
Name		Position	Tenure	Inducted
Chuck Daly ^{2}		Head coach	1997–1999	1994
Doc Rivers		Head coach	1999–2003	2026

Notes:

- ^{1} In total, Ewing was inducted into the Hall of Fame twice – as player and as a member of the 1992 Olympic team. Also served as assistant coach in 2007–2012.
- ^{2} In total, Daly was inducted into the Hall of Fame twice – as coach and as a member of the 1992 Olympic team
- ^{3} In total, Howard was inducted into the Hall of Fame twice – as player and as a member of the 2008 Olympic team

=== FIBA Hall of Famers ===
Orlando Magic Hall of Famers
Players
No.	Name	Position	Tenure	Inducted
32	Shaquille O'Neal	C	1992–1996	2017
15	Hedo Türkoğlu	F	2004–2009; 2010–2014	2026
Coaches
Name		Position	Tenure	Inducted
Chuck Daly ^{1}		Head coach	1997–1999	2021

Notes:

- ^{1} In total, Daly was inducted into the FIBA Hall of Fame twice – as coach and as a member of the 1992 Olympic team.

=== Orlando Magic Hall of Fame ===
In 2014, the Orlando Magic launched the team's Hall of Fame, which honors players, coaches and executives who have had a major impact for the team and in the community.

Orlando Magic Hall of Fame
Players
No.	Name	Position	Tenure	Inducted
25	Nick Anderson	G	1989–1999	2014
32	Shaquille O'Neal	C	1992–1996	2015
1	Penny Hardaway	G	1993–1999	2017
1	Tracy McGrady	G/F	2000–2004	2018
10	Darrell Armstrong	G	1995–2003	2020
3	Dennis Scott	F	1990–1997	2023
12	Dwight Howard	C	2004–2012	2025
Staff
Name		Position	Tenure	Inducted
Pat Williams		Co-founder	1988–2024	2014
Richard DeVos		Owner	1991–2018	2016
Jim Hewitt		Founder	—	2017
David Steele		Broadcaster	1989–present	2019
Brian Hill		Head coach	1993–1997; 2005–2007	2022
John Gabriel		General manager	1996–2004	2022

== Season-by-season record ==
List of the last five seasons completed by the Magic. For the full season-by-season history, see List of Orlando Magic seasons.

Note: GP = Games played, W = Wins, L = Losses, W–L% = Winning percentage

Season	GP	W	L	W–L%	Finish	Playoffs
2021–22	82	22	60	.268	5th, Southeast	Did not qualify
2022–23	82	34	48	.415	4th, Southeast	Did not qualify
2023–24	82	47	35	.573	1st, Southeast	Lost in first round, 3–4 (Cavaliers)
2024–25	82	41	41	.500	1st, Southeast	Lost in first round, 1–4 (Celtics)
2025–26	82	45	37	.549	2nd, Southeast	Lost in first round, 3–4 (Pistons)

== Rivalries ==
=== Miami Heat ===
The Orlando Magic and the Miami Heat had a rivalry because both teams are located in Florida, thus the rivalry was known as the Sunshine State rivalry. Another ingredient to the rivalry was the high-caliber players on both teams such as Orlando's Shaquille O'Neal and Penny Hardaway to Miami's Alonzo Mourning and Tim Hardaway. The two had met each other in the NBA playoffs for the first time in 1997, with Miami beating Orlando 3–2, they have not met in the playoffs since.

The rivalry intensified during the 2000s and early 2010s with the rising stardom of Miami's and Orlando's Dwyane Wade and Dwight Howard, respectively, along with Miami's acquiring high caliber stars such LeBron James from the Cleveland Cavaliers and Chris Bosh from the Toronto Raptors and in 2010, resulting in fierce competition between the two.

When Dwight Howard departed from the Magic to the Los Angeles Lakers in August 2012, the rivalry softened. The Orlando Magic have been going through a process of rebuilding ever since then.

=== Atlanta Hawks ===
The Atlanta Hawks and the Orlando Magic had an intense rivalry, mostly stemming from playoff competitions and the rising stardom of Dwight Howard and Josh Smith, both from the 2004 NBA draft and who were both raised in Georgia.

The two teams faced each other three times in the 1996, 2010, and 2011 NBA playoffs. The Magic defeated the Hawks in the second round of the 1996 playoffs 4–1, and swept the second-round series 4–0 in the 2010 playoffs, while the Hawks eliminated the Magic 4–2 in the first round of the corresponding 2011 playoffs.

== Media ==
=== Television ===
The current television announcing team for the Orlando Magic is play-by-play announcer David Steele and color analyst Jeff Turner. Turner played for the Magic from its inaugural 1989 season to 1996. Kendra Douglas reports as well. Paul Kennedy and Dante Marchetelli serve as courtside reporters, while Marchetelli, former coach Brian Hill, and former Magic player Nick Anderson host the pre-game, halftime and post-game shows. Television broadcasts were split in 2007–08 between Fox Sports Florida and Sun Sports (later Fox Sports Sun, currently FanDuel Sports Network Sun). In the 18 years before then, broadcasts were split between Sun Sports (formerly known as the Sunshine Network) and local television stations, originally WKCF and, later, WRBW.

There was a controversy with moving broadcasts to Fox Sports Florida since Orlando's largest cable TV provider, Bright House Networks, did not carry the network. Pressure increased for the cable provider to pick up FS Florida in time for the 2007–08 NBA season but this did not happen. The Magic persisted with airing games on FS Florida into the 2008–09 season despite Bright House's refusal to pick up the channel in all of its affiliates. Bright House and FS Florida came to an agreement on January 1, 2009, and began airing the channel as part of its standard cable package. However, Bright House airs the channel using a digital signal that only allows customers who own the Digital cable box to receive the channel. The customers do not have to pay any additional costs to get the channel with their Digital cable box.

Magic games were aired on FanDuel Sports Network Florida prior to the 2025–26 season. Following the closure of the FanDuel Sports Networks, the Magic announced a deal with Cox Media Group to air games on broadcast television beginning in the 2026–27 season. Most games will air on WRDQ, with sister ABC affiliate WFTV showing select games. In the Jacksonville area the games will also air on Cox Media Group owned Action Sports Jax TV on WJAX-TV (47.2), with some broadcasts planned on WJAX (47.1) and WFOX-TV. Hearst owned WMOR-TV will carry the games in the Tampa market. Outside of Central Florida, Gray Media stations will broadcast Magic games on its stations in Gainesville, Panama City and Tallahassee; most games will air on 365BLK subchannels in those markets.

=== Radio ===
After the end of the 2019–20 season, the Orlando Magic decided not to renew its contract with play-by-play announcer Dennis Neumann and color analyst Richie Adubato, another former Magic head coach. Games are produced by Magic Radio Network flagship AM 580 WDBO in Orlando, and also broadcast on AM 1380 WELE in Daytona Beach, 99.5 FM WGMW "The Star" in Gainesville and Ocala, AM 1290 WPCF in Panama City, AM 1590 WPSL in Port St. Lucie and AM 1450 WSTU in Stuart. The affiliate in Tallahassee is AM 1270 "My 94.3" WTLY. The immediate Tampa Bay area has no affiliate although AM 1340 in Clearwater WTAN is listed on the team's website. The Magic will continue to have a radio presence using the audio from its television broadcasts.

The flagship broadcast was simulcast on WDBO-FM during the 2011–12 NBA season while that station moved from AM to FM. When WDBO re-formatted from talk radio to sports radio, it retained the flagship status. However, WOEX (the former WDBO-FM) still simulcasts Magic games in Central Florida.

=== Podcasts ===
The official Orlando Magic website features a collection of podcasts available on iTunes, including "Magic Overtime with Dante and Galante".

== Leaders ==
=== Franchise leaders ===
Bold denotes still active with team.

Italic denotes still active but not with team.

Points scored (regular season) (as of the 2025–26 NBA season)

1. Dwight Howard (11,435)
2. Nick Anderson (10,650)
3. **Nikola Vučević** (10,423)
4. Tracy McGrady (8,298)
5. Jameer Nelson (8,184)
6. Shaquille O'Neal (8,019)
7. Hedo Türkoğlu (7,216)
8. Evan Fournier (7,049)
9. Penny Hardaway (7,018)
10. Dennis Scott (6,603)
11. **Franz Wagner** (6,251)
12. **Paolo Banchero** (6,031)
13. Darrell Armstrong (5,898)
14. Aaron Gordon (5,507)
15. Scott Skiles (4,966)
16. Horace Grant (4,638)
17. Terrence Ross (4,427)
18. **Wendell Carter Jr.** (4,200)
19. Rashard Lewis (4,194)
20. Cole Anthony (4,015)

Other statistics (regular season) (as of the 2025–26 NBA season)

Most minutes played
Player	Minutes
Dwight Howard	22,471
Nick Anderson	22,440
Jameer Nelson	19,038
Nikola Vučević	18,791
Hedo Türkoğlu	16,233
Darrell Armstrong	14,234
Horace Grant	14,233
Penny Hardaway	13,721
Evan Fournier	13,714
Dennis Scott	13,692

Most rebounds
Player	Rebounds
Dwight Howard	8,072
Nikola Vučević	6,381
Shaquille O'Neal	3,691
Nick Anderson	3,667
Horace Grant	3,353
**Wendell Carter Jr.**	2,788
Aaron Gordon	2,753
Hedo Türkoğlu	2,221
Bo Outlaw	2,160
Tracy McGrady	2,067

Most assists
Player	Assists
Jameer Nelson	3,501
Scott Skiles	2,776
Darrell Armstrong	2,555
Penny Hardaway	2,343
Nick Anderson	1,937
Hedo Türkoğlu	1,927
Elfrid Payton	1,805
Nikola Vučević	1,668
Tracy McGrady	1,533
Evan Fournier	1,299

Most steals
Player	Steals
Nick Anderson	1,004
Darrell Armstrong	830
Penny Hardaway	718
Dwight Howard	626
Jameer Nelson	619
Nikola Vučević	537
Tracy McGrady	452
Dennis Scott	429
Horace Grant	426
Hedo Türkoğlu	425

Most blocks
Player	Blocks
Dwight Howard	1,344
Shaquille O'Neal	824
Nikola Vučević	550
Bo Outlaw	536
Horace Grant	415
**Jonathan Isaac**	391
Mo Bamba	364
Nick Anderson	338
Tracy McGrady	292
Aaron Gordon	277

Most three-pointers made
Player	3-pointers made
Dennis Scott	981
Nick Anderson	900
Evan Fournier	895
Jameer Nelson	874
Hedo Türkoğlu	794
Terrance Ross	697
Rashard Lewis	658
Darrell Armstrong	654
Pat Garrity	624
JJ Redick	549

=== Individual records ===
- **Most points in one game** with **62** (Tracy McGrady on March 10, 2004, vs. Washington Wizards)
- **Most points in one half** with **37** in the first half (Tracy McGrady on March 9, 2003, vs. Denver Nuggets)
- **Most points in one quarter** with **25** in the second quarter (Tracy McGrady on March 9, 2003, vs. Denver Nuggets)
- **Most free throws made in one game** with **21** (Dwight Howard on January 12, 2012, vs. Golden State Warriors
- **Most free throws attempted in one game** with **39** (Dwight Howard on January 12, 2012, vs. Golden State Warriors) ***NBA Record
- **Most points in a playoff game** with **46** (Dwight Howard in Game 1 of 2011 Eastern Conference playoffs, First round vs. Atlanta Hawks and Tracy McGrady in Game 2 of the 2003 Eastern Conference playoffs, First round vs. Detroit Pistons)
- **Most assists made in one game** with **30** (Scott Skiles on December 30, 1990, vs. Denver Nuggets) ***NBA Record
- **Most rebounds in one game** with **29** (Nikola Vučević on December 31, 2012, vs. Miami Heat)

== Franchise accomplishments and awards ==
=== Individual awards ===
NBA Defensive Player of the Year

- Dwight Howard – 2009, 2010, 2011

NBA Rookie of the Year

- Shaquille O'Neal – 1993
- Mike Miller – 2001
- Paolo Banchero – 2023

NBA Sixth Man of the Year

- Darrell Armstrong – 1999

NBA Sportsmanship Award

- Grant Hill – 2005

NBA Most Improved Player of the Year

- Scott Skiles – 1991
- Darrell Armstrong – 1999
- Tracy McGrady – 2001
- Hedo Türkoğlu – 2008
- Ryan Anderson – 2012

NBA Coach of the Year

- Doc Rivers – 2000

NBA Executive of the Year

- John Gabriel – 2000

NBA scoring champion

- Shaquille O'Neal – 1995
- Tracy McGrady – 2003, 2004

All-NBA First Team

- Penny Hardaway – 1995, 1996
- Tracy McGrady – 2002, 2003
- Dwight Howard – 2008–2012

All-NBA Second Team

- Shaquille O'Neal – 1995
- Tracy McGrady – 2001, 2004

All-NBA Third Team

- Shaquille O'Neal – 1994, 1996
- Penny Hardaway – 1997
- Dwight Howard – 2007

NBA All-Defensive First Team

- Dwight Howard – 2009–2012

NBA All-Defensive Second Team

- Horace Grant – 1995, 1996
- Dwight Howard – 2008
- Jalen Suggs – 2024

NBA All-Rookie First Team

- Dennis Scott – 1991
- Shaquille O'Neal – 1993
- Penny Hardaway – 1994
- Matt Harpring – 1999
- Mike Miller – 2001
- Drew Gooden – 2003
- Dwight Howard – 2005
- Victor Oladipo – 2014
- Elfrid Payton – 2015
- Franz Wagner – 2022
- Paolo Banchero – 2023

NBA All-Rookie Second Team

- Stanley Roberts – 1992
- Michael Doleac – 1999
- Chucky Atkins – 2000
- Gordan Giriček – 2003
- Jameer Nelson – 2005

=== NBA All-Star Weekend ===
NBA All-Star Team

- Shaquille O'Neal – 1993–1996
- Penny Hardaway – 1995–1998
- Tracy McGrady – 2001–2004
- Grant Hill – 2001, 2005
- Dwight Howard – 2007–2012
- Rashard Lewis – 2009
- Jameer Nelson – 2009
- Nikola Vučević – 2019, 2021
- Paolo Banchero – 2024

NBA All-Star head coaches

- Brian Hill – 1995
- Stan Van Gundy – 2010
