= Darrell Armstrong =

American basketball player and coach (born 1968)

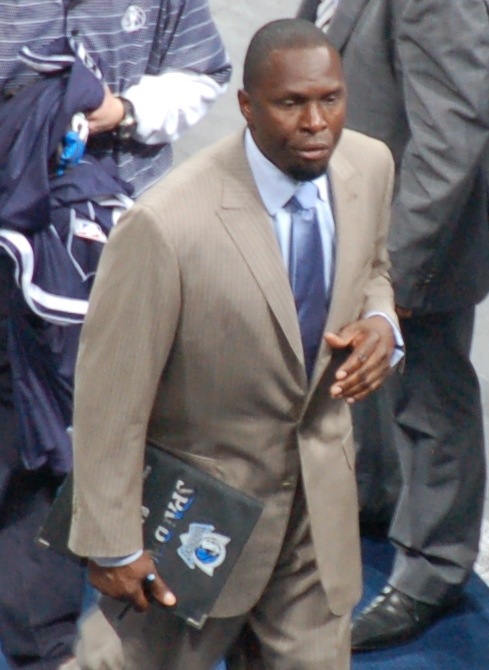
- Armstrong with the Dallas Mavericks as an assistant coach in 2012

Personal information
- Born: June 22, 1968 (age 58) Gastonia, North Carolina, U.S.
- Listed height: 6 ft 1 in (1.85 m)
- Listed weight: 180 lb (82 kg)

Career information
- High school: Ashbrook (Gastonia, North Carolina)
- College: Fayetteville State (1988–1991)
- NBA draft: 1991: undrafted
- Playing career: 1991–2008
- Position: Point guard
- Number: 10, 3, 24
- Coaching career: 2009–present

Career history

Playing
- 1991–1994: Atlanta Eagles/Trojans
- 1992: Capital Region Pontiacs
- 1992–1993: South Georgia Blues
- 1993–1994: Pezoporikos Larnaca
- 1994–1995: Ourense
- 1995–2003: Orlando Magic
- 2003–2004: New Orleans Hornets
- 2004–2006: Dallas Mavericks
- 2006–2007: Indiana Pacers
- 2007–2008: New Jersey Nets

Coaching
- 2009–2025: Dallas Mavericks (assistant)

Career highlights
- As player: NBA Most Improved Player (1999); NBA Sixth Man of the Year (1999); Galician Cup champion (1995); Spanish League Top Scorer (1995); Cyprus Basketball Player of the Year (1994); ULEB All-Star (1994); 2× All-USBL First Team (1993, 1994); All-USBL Second Team (1992); 3× USBL All-Defensive Team (1992–1994); First-team All-CIAA (1991); As assistant coach: NBA champion (2011)

Career NBA statistics
- Points: 7,712 (9.2 ppg)
- Rebounds: 2,269 (2.7 rpg)
- Assists: 3,394 (4.0 apg)
- Stats at NBA.com
- Stats at Basketball Reference

Darrell Eugene Armstrong (born June 22, 1968) is an American professional basketball coach and former player who last was an assistant coach for the Dallas Mavericks of the National Basketball Association (NBA). He played 14 seasons in the NBA for the Orlando Magic, New Orleans Hornets, Dallas Mavericks, Indiana Pacers and New Jersey Nets. Armstrong was selected as the Most Improved Player and Sixth Man of the Year while playing for the Magic in 1999. He retired from playing in 2008 and joined the Mavericks as an assistant coach in 2009. He won his first NBA championship with the Mavericks in 2011.

== Early life ==
Armstrong was born in Gastonia, North Carolina and graduated from Ashbrook High School of Gastonia in 1986. At Ashbrook, Armstrong was a punter and wide receiver on the football team and began playing basketball as a senior. Armstrong then attended Fayetteville State University, a Division II college in Fayetteville, North Carolina and part of the Central Intercollegiate Athletic Association (CIAA) conference, and joined the football team as a walk-on placekicker. Armstrong played football for the 1986 and 1987 seasons and twice kicked school-record 48-yard field goals. In 1988, Armstrong joined the Fayetteville State basketball team and would play three seasons under coach Jeff Capel II. In his senior season of 1990–91, Armstrong played 24 games and averaged 16.4 points, 3.6 rebounds, and 4.7 assists. Armstrong was the CIAA Slam Dunk champion in 1990 and a first-team All-CIAA selection in 1991.

== Minor and international leagues (1991–1995) ==
Armstrong was not selected in the 1991 NBA draft and began his career with the Atlanta Eagles (renamed Trojans in 1994) of the United States Basketball League (USBL) in 1991. Armstrong was named to the USBL All-Defensive team three consecutive seasons from 1992 to 1994, was a second-team All-USBL selection in 1992, and first-team All-USBL selection in 1993 and 1994.

In October 1992, Armstrong signed with the Capital Region Pontiacs of the Continental Basketball Association (CBA). Armstrong later played for the South Georgia Blues of the Global Basketball Association until the team folded in 1993. After playing for the Blues, Armstrong returned to Gastonia. He volunteered at Ashbrook High School as an assistant basketball coach and worked the night shift at a yarn factory.

Armstrong signed with Pezoporikos Larnaca of Cyprus in 1993. He averaged 32.0 points and 8.0 assists and won Player of the Year honors.

For the 1994–95 season, Armstrong played for Coren Ourense of the Spanish Liga ACB and averaged 24.6 points, 4.5 rebounds, and 2.5 assists. He was a ULEB All-Star in 1994.

== NBA career ==
=== Orlando Magic ===
Armstrong first signed with the NBA as a free agent for the Orlando Magic in late 1994–95, playing in the last 3 games of the regular season with 10 points in 8 minutes of action including a spectacular one-handed reverse windmill dunk late in a blowout vs the Indiana Pacers in his 2nd game. In 95–96 he played just 41 minutes in 13 games, scoring 42 points total; despite his limited minutes, he participated in the 1996 Slam Dunk Contest. He was inactive after February.

He saw 67 games in his first full season on the roster in 1996–97, averaging 6 points per game in 15 minutes per game off the bench. Armstrong won the NBA Sixth Man of the Year Award and the NBA Most Improved Player Award in 1999, thus becoming the first player in NBA history to win both awards simultaneously. In a 1999 game against the Philadelphia 76ers, Armstrong stole an inbounds pass and streaked to the other end of the court for a game winning layup as time expired. He subsequently became the starting point guard for the Magic. His career year was in 1999–00, averaging 16.2 ppg in 31 mpg.

On February 14, 2001, Armstrong recorded 22 points and a career-high 16 assists in a 114–101 win over the Los Angeles Clippers.

During his nine years in Orlando, the team never posted a losing record, making the NBA playoffs seven times.

On July 7, 2003, Armstrong was arrested after an incident outside an Orlando night club. He was subsequently charged with resisting arrest and assaulting a police officer, but the case was eventually dismissed.

=== New Orleans Hornets ===
During the 2003 off-season, Armstrong signed with the New Orleans Hornets as a free agent.

=== Dallas Mavericks ===
He was traded by the Hornets to the Dallas Mavericks in exchange for Dan Dickau and a second-round draft pick on December 3, 2004. On December 19, 2005, while he was still with the Dallas Mavericks, Armstrong was fined $1,000 for grabbing a microphone before a Mavericks game against the Minnesota Timberwolves at the American Airlines Center and yelling "How 'bout those Redskins!" Only a few hours prior, the Cowboys had been routed by the Redskins 35–7. Armstrong was raised in North Carolina as a Redskins fan.

=== Indiana Pacers ===
After appearing in the 2006 NBA Finals with the Mavericks, he was traded to the Indiana Pacers in exchange for guard Anthony Johnson in July 2006. Armstrong was released by the Pacers on October 1, 2007.

=== New Jersey Nets ===
After being released by the Pacers, Armstrong signed with the New Jersey Nets after clearing waivers. He appeared in 50 games in 2007–08, averaging 2.5 ppg in 11.0 minutes, and buried three 3-pointers in his final appearance of the season.

== Player profile ==
Despite his short height, Armstrong had the ability to dunk. He accidentally completed a reverse layup in the 1996 Slam Dunk Contest, which was deemed the worst dunk in the competition's history by Kenny Smith. Subsequently, he was awarded last place in the contest.

== Coaching career ==
On January 26, 2009, the Dallas Mavericks hired Armstrong to be assistant coach for player development. Armstrong helped coach the Mavericks to win the 2011 NBA Finals. In April 2025, he was removed from the media website after being arrested on a charge of aggravated assault.

== Personal life ==
Darrell is the parent of four children: Arkia Armstrong, Maliyah Armstrong (Malone), Darrell (DJ) Armstrong Jr., and Tyson Jarrell. Darrell was remarried to Shantelle Armstrong (Brooks) in 2026.

== NBA career statistics ==
Legend
GP	Games played	GS	Games started	MPG	Minutes per game
FG%	Field goal percentage	3P%	3-point field goal percentage	FT%	Free throw percentage
RPG	Rebounds per game	APG	Assists per game	SPG	Steals per game
BPG	Blocks per game	PPG	Points per game	**Bold**	Career high
*	Led the league

=== Regular season ===
Year	Team	GP	GS	MPG	FG%	3P%	FT%	RPG	APG	SPG	BPG	PPG
1994–95	Orlando	3	0	2.7	.375	.333	**1.000**	.3	1.0	.3	.0	3.3
1995–96	Orlando	13	0	3.2	**.500**	**.500**	**1.000**	.2	.4	.5	.0	3.2
1996–97	Orlando	67	0	15.1	.383	.304	.868	1.1	2.6	.9	.1	6.1
1997–98	Orlando	48	17	25.8	.411	.368	.854	3.3	4.9	1.2	.1	9.2
1998–99	Orlando	50*	15	30.0	.441	.365	.904	3.6	6.7	**2.2**	.1	13.8
1999–00	Orlando	**82**	**82***	31.6	.433	.340	.911	3.3	6.1	2.1	.1	**16.2**
2000–01	Orlando	75	75	**36.9**	.412	.355	.884	**4.6**	**7.0**	1.8	**.2**	15.9
2001–02	Orlando	**82**	79	33.3	.419	.349	.888	3.9	5.5	1.9	.1	12.4
2002–03	Orlando	**82**	23	28.7	.409	.336	.878	3.6	3.9	1.6	**.2**	9.4
2003–04	New Orleans	79	22	28.4	.395	.315	.854	2.9	3.9	1.7	**.2**	10.6
2004–05	New Orleans	14	9	29.4	.333	.243	.905	3.4	4.6	1.1	.1	10.1
2004–05	Dallas	52	7	11.1	.305	.268	.830	1.3	2.2	.6	.1	2.3
2005–06	Dallas	62	2	10.0	.336	.229	.786	1.3	1.4	.4	.1	2.1
2006–07	Indiana	81	4	15.7	.414	.336	.785	1.7	2.4	.9	.1	5.6
2007–08	New Jersey	50	2	11.0	.364	.333	.667	1.3	1.5	.6	.0	2.5
Career		840	337	23.7	.409	.334	.871	2.7	4.0	1.4	.1	9.2

=== Playoffs ===
Year	Team	GP	GS	MPG	FG%	3P%	FT%	RPG	APG	SPG	BPG	PPG
1997	Orlando	5	0	28.6	.476	.333	.846	4.2	3.4	1.6	.2	11.4
1999	Orlando	4	**4**	40.8	.370	**.375**	**1.000**	5.0	**6.3**	**2.2**	.0	14.8
2001	Orlando	4	**4**	**41.8**	.378	.368	.923	**5.5**	4.8	2.0	**.5**	13.3
2002	Orlando	4	**4**	39.5	.476	.235	.810	2.8	3.3	1.2	.0	**15.3**
2003	Orlando	7	1	32.3	.455	.333	.909	2.4	3.7	.9	.0	9.4
2004	New Orleans	7	0	21.4	.235	.200	**1.000**	2.1	2.3	.9	.0	3.4
2005	Dallas	9	0	7.3	**.500**	.250	.000	.4	1.0	.3	.2	2.0
2006	Dallas	**11**	0	4.3	.200	.000	**1.000**	.6	.2	.3	.1	.7
Career		51	13	22.0	.398	.287	.900	2.3	2.5	.9	.1	6.8

== See also ==
- List of National Basketball Association career free throw percentage leaders
