= Alex Martins (basketball) =

American sports executive (born 1964)

- Born: January 12, 1964 (age 62)
- Education: graduated from Saint Cecilias HS Kearny NJ 1981
- Alma mater: Villanova University (BBA); University of Central Florida (MBA)
- Occupation: CEO
- Years active: 1989–present
- Employer: Orlando Magic

Alex Martins (born January 12, 1964) is an American sports executive. He was last the chief executive officer, of the Orlando Magic of the National Basketball Association, positions he has held since 2006. He began his career with the Magic in 1989 as the team's public relations director.

Martins is recognized as one of the most influential leaders in Central Florida, ranking fifth on the list of "The 25 Most Powerful People in Central Florida." He has received accolades such as the 2013 Charles Andrews Memorial Hospitality Award for his contributions to the local hospitality industry and charities.

He serves on the board of Visit Orlando and played a key role in securing the 2012 NBA All-Star Game, which had a significant economic impact on the city. He also oversaw the construction of the Amway Center, one of North America's premier sports facilities, and is involved in a $200 million downtown development project approved by the Orlando City Council.

Martins also currently serves as a member of the University of Central Florida Board of Trustees. He graduated from Villanova University with his Bachelor of Science in Business Administration in 1986, and from UCF with a Master's of Business Administration (MBA) in 2001.
