= RDV Sports, Inc. =

Michigan, US corporation owned by Richard DeVos

Coordinates: 42.9657°N 85.6700°W

RDV Sports
- Company type: Private
- Industry: Professional sports, property management
- Founded: 1991
- Headquarters: Orlando, Florida, U.S.
- Area served: Orange County, Florida
- Key people: Chairman: Dan DeVos; CEO: Alex Martins
- Services: Professional Sports Teams & Organizations
- Subsidiaries: Orlando Magic; Orlando Solar Bears; RDV Sportsplex

RDV Sports, Inc. is a Michigan-based corporation set up by Richard DeVos to purchase the NBA franchise, the Orlando Magic. Established in 1991, its assets have included the Orlando Miracle WNBA team, Orlando Solar Bears of the ECHL and the RDV Sportsplex.

In May 2017, RDV Sports agreed to purchase the Solar Bears when the Orlando Pro Hockey Operations, L.P. ownership group informed them that they could no longer sustain the team. The DeVos family were the owners of the IHL Solar Bears from 1995 through 2001.
