= John Gabriel (basketball) =

American basketball executive and coach

Orlando Magic
- Position: Executive Advisor
- League: NBA

John Gabriel is an American basketball executive who serves as the executive advisor for the Orlando Magic of the National Basketball Association. He is known for his time as general manager with the Magic, who reached the NBA Playoffs five times during his tenure.

== Career ==
=== Philadelphia 76ers ===
Gabriel started his coaching career with the Philadelphia 76ers working as an assistant coach, the director of video scouting, and the scouting coordinator.

=== Orlando Magic ===
Gabriel was hired by the Magic in 1987 as the director of player personnel, director of scouting and assistant coach. Gabriel helped the Magic reach the NBA Playoffs two times as vice president of basketball operations, and as a player personnel coach from 1994 to 1996. He reached the NBA Finals in 1995, won the Eastern Conference Finals in 1995 and won the Atlantic Division in 1995, 1996 and 1999.

With Darrell Armstrong leading the team, the Magic compiled a 41–41 record but missed the playoffs in the 1999 season. Gabriel hired Doc Rivers as head coach of the Magic at the beginning of that season. Rivers won Coach of the Year honors. In 2000, Gabriel won the NBA and Sport Illustrated Executive of the Year Award. The following season, Gabriel pursued free agents Grant Hill, Tim Duncan and Tracy McGrady. Ultimately, Hill and McGrady came to Orlando, while Duncan decided to stay with the San Antonio Spurs. In addition, Gabriel drafted Mike Miller, who would later become Rookie of the Year.

Gabriel was let go by the Magic in the middle of a franchise record 19-game losing streak during the 2003–04 NBA season.

Elected to the Magic Hall of Fame in 2022.

=== Portland Trail Blazers ===
Gabriel returned to basketball in the NBA as an executive and scout first for the Portland Trail Blazers.

=== New York Knicks ===
In 2008, he became the director of scouting for the New York Knicks.

== Personal life ==
Gabriel's great-grandparent Francesco Gabriele immigrated to the United States from Guardiagrele – Italy in the late 19th century.

Gabriel revealed in 2012 that he had been suffering from Parkinson's disease.

Gabriel is a 1978 graduate of Kutztown State Teachers College (now Kutztown University of Pennsylvania), where he played basketball. He was inducted into the school's Athletics Hall of Fame in 2006.
