= Hospice (disambiguation) =

Hospice is a type of care and a philosophy of care that focuses on the palliation of a terminally ill patient's symptoms.

Hospice may also refer to:

- Hospice (Achilles album), 2007
- Hospice (The Antlers album), 2009
- "Hospice", an episode of Aqua Teen Hunger Force
- Hospice-Anthelme Verreau (1828–1901), Canadian priest

== See also ==
- Hostel, short-term dormitory accommodations for travelers
- List of hospice programs
