= Vernon Carey Jr. =

American basketball player (born 2001)

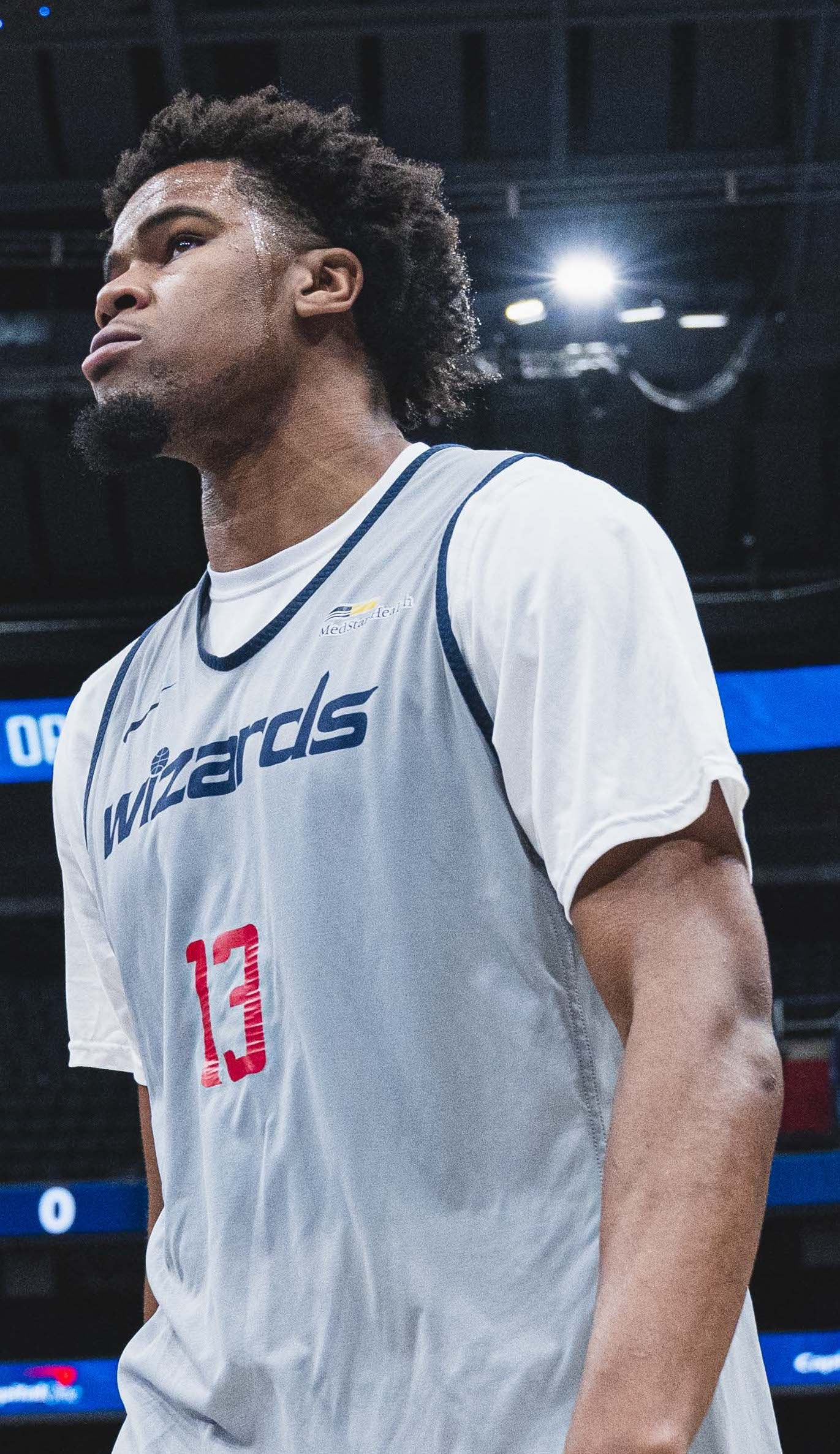
- Carey with the Washington Wizards in 2022

Free Agent
- Position: Power forward / center

Personal information
- Born: February 25, 2001 (age 25) Miami, Florida, U.S.
- Listed height: 6 ft 10 in (2.08 m)
- Listed weight: 270 lb (122 kg)

Career information
- High school: NSU University School (Fort Lauderdale, Florida)
- College: Duke (2019–2020)
- NBA draft: 2020: 2nd round, 32nd overall pick
- Drafted by: Charlotte Hornets
- Playing career: 2020–present

Career history
- 2020–2022: Charlotte Hornets
- 2021–2022: →Greensboro Swarm
- 2022–2023: Washington Wizards
- 2022–2023: →Capital City Go-Go
- 2023–2024: Karşıyaka
- 2025–2026: Rio Grande Valley Vipers

Career highlights
- All-FIBA Champions League Second Team (2024); Consensus second-team All-American (2020); USBWA National Freshman of the Year (2020); NABC Freshman of the Year (2020); First-team All-ACC (2020); ACC Rookie of the Year (2020); ACC All-Freshman Team (2020); McDonald's All-American (2019); 2× Florida Mr. Basketball (2018, 2019); FIBA Americas Under-16 Championship MVP (2017)
- Stats at NBA.com
- Stats at Basketball Reference
Medals
Men's basketball
Representing the United States
FIBA Americas U16 Championship
Gold medal – first place	2017 Argentina

Vernon A. Carey Jr. (born February 25, 2001) is an American professional basketball player who last played for the Rio Grande Valley Vipers of the NBA G League. He played college basketball for the Duke Blue Devils. He finished his high school career at NSU University School as a five-star recruit and among the top-ranked players in the 2019 class.

== High school career ==
Carey starred for four years at University School of Nova Southeastern University in Fort Lauderdale, Florida. During his freshman season, he averaged 18.0 points, 7.0 rebounds and 2.0 blocks while leading the Sharks to a 15–9 overall record. As a sophomore, Carey averaged 22.0 points and 8.0 rebounds per game, while leading his team to a 20–7 record and a Florida district state championship. After his sophomore year, Carey was named to the 2017 Miami Herald and Sun Sentinel all-district teams as well as 2017 MaxPreps All-American honorable mention.

As a junior, Carey averaged 26.0 points and 10.1 rebounds a game, while leading the Sharks to an overall record of 36–2, the 2018 Florida 5A state championship, and championships at the 2017 City of Palms Invitational and the 2017 John Wall Invitational. Carey led his team to the finals at the High School National Tournament, losing in the championship game to Montverde Academy and its star, RJ Barrett.

Carey averaged 17.4 points and 5.3 rebounds per game on the Nike Elite Youth Basketball League (EYBL) Circuit for his AAU team, Nike Team Florida.

Carey finished his senior season averaging 21.7 points, 9.0 rebounds and 1.1 blocks per game. The 2018–19 University team with a supporting cast of Scottie Barnes, Taylor Hendricks, Jace Howard and Jett Howard, successfully defended its FHSSA Class 5A State championship with a victory over Andrew Jackson High School, despite Carey being sidelined for the championship game.

=== Recruiting ===
On December 6, 2018, Carey announced on SportsCenter that he was committed to attend Duke University. He made the announcement on the one-year anniversary of his grandfather's passing.

At the end of his senior season, Carey was ranked the sixth-best player in the country, rated a five-star recruit by all major recruiting services, and selected to play in the 2019 McDonald's All-American Boys Game and the Jordan Brand Classic.

College recruiting
Name	Hometown	School	Height	Weight	Commit date
Vernon Carey Jr. C	Fort Lauderdale, FL	NSU University School (FL)	6 ft 10 in (2.08 m)	275 lb (125 kg)	Dec 6, 2018
Vernon Carey Jr. C	Recruit ratings: Rivals: 247Sports: ESPN: (96)				
Overall recruit ranking: Rivals: 5 247Sports: 6 ESPN: 6
Note: In many cases, Scout, Rivals, 247Sports, On3, and ESPN may conflict in their listings of height and weight.; In these cases, the average was taken. ESPN grades are on a 100-point scale.; Sources: "Duke 2019 Basketball Commitments". Rivals.; "2019 Duke Blue Devils Recruiting Class". ESPN.; "2019 Team Ranking". Rivals.

== College career ==
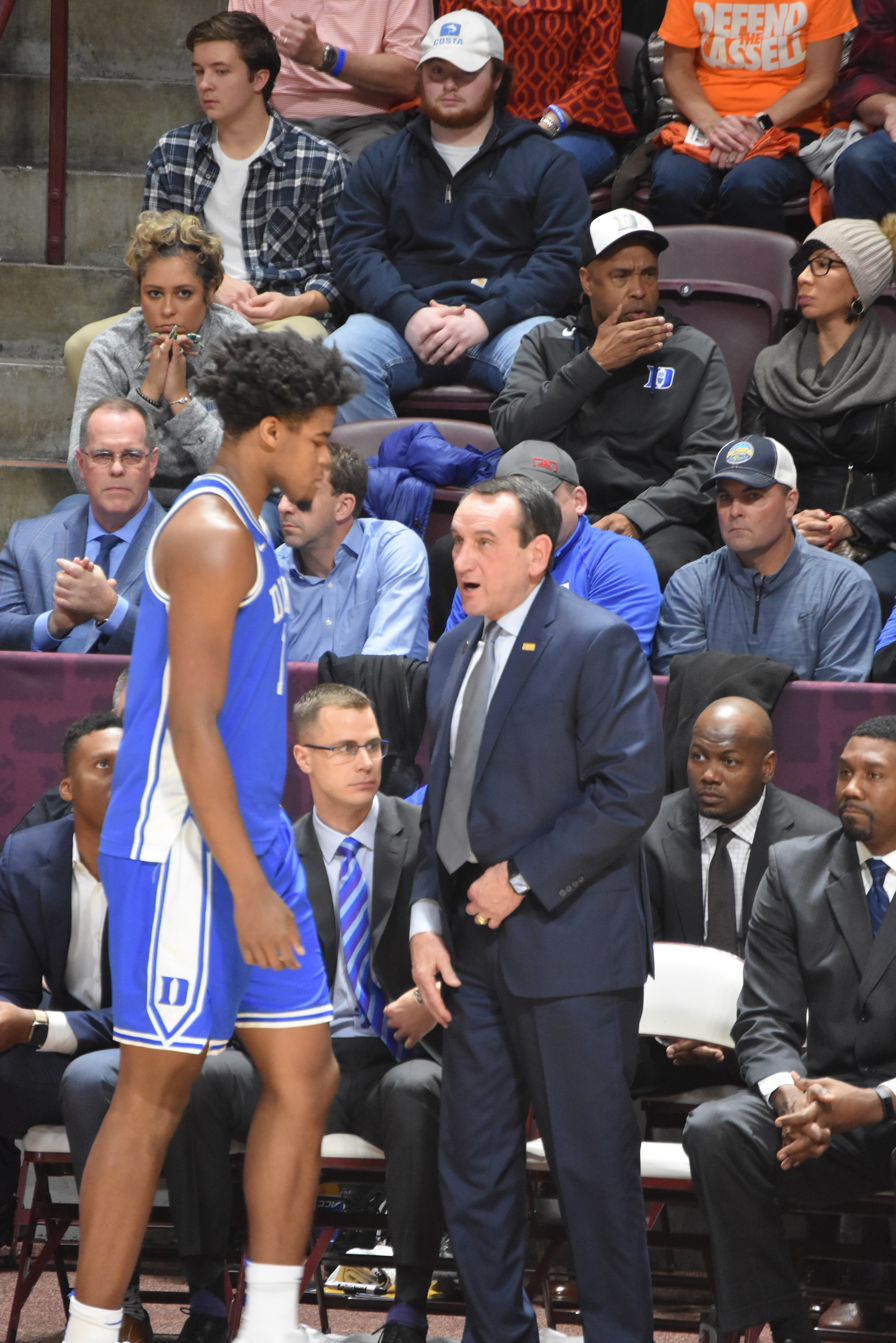
Carey and Duke coach Mike Krzyzewski in December 2019

Before the start of the 2019–20 season, Carey was named to the John R. Wooden Award Preseason Top 50 list as well as the Naismith, Kareem Abdul-Jabbar Award and Lute Olson Award preseason watchlists.

On November 12, Carey recorded his first double-double of the season scoring 17 points and 10 rebounds in a 105–54 win against Central Arkansas. On November 15, Carey scored a career-high 20 points and grabbed 10 rebounds in a 74–63 win over Georgia State. On November 21, Carey scored a career-high 31 points and 12 rebounds in an 87–52 win over California. On the next night, Carey recorded 20 points and 10 rebounds in an 81–73 victory over Georgetown, and was named MVP of the 2K Sports Classic tournament. Carey earned both player and freshman of the week honors in the Atlantic Coast Conference (ACC).

On December 3, Carey scored 26 points, 11 rebounds and 3 blocks in an 87–75 win against Michigan State in the ACC–Big Ten Challenge. On December 19, Carey posted another double-double of 20 points and 10 rebounds in an 86–57 win over Wofford. On December 23, he was named ACC freshman of the week for the third consecutive time. On January 4, Carey scored 24 points and grabbed nine rebounds in a 95–62 win against Miami. On January 28, Carey erupted for 26 points and 13 rebounds in a 79–67 victory over Pittsburgh. On February 1, Carey registered 26 points and a career-high 17 rebounds in a 97–88 win against Syracuse. At the conclusion of the regular season, Carey was named ACC Freshman of the Year and was selected to the First Team All-ACC. Carey averaged 17.8 points, 8.8 rebounds and 1.6 blocks per game as a freshman, earning National Freshman of the Year honors from the U.S. Basketball Writers Association and the National Association of Basketball Coaches. Following the season he declared for the 2020 NBA draft.

== Professional career ==
=== Charlotte Hornets (2020–2022) ===
Carey was taken by the Charlotte Hornets with the 32nd pick of the 2020 NBA draft. On November 30, 2020, he signed a multi-year contract with the Hornets. Carey made his NBA debut on December 30, playing four minutes in a 118–99 win over the Dallas Mavericks. On April 16, 2021, he scored a career-high 21 points, alongside six rebounds, in a 115–130 loss to the Brooklyn Nets.

During his rookie and sophomore seasons, Carey received multiple assignments to the Greensboro Swarm, Charlotte's NBA G League affiliate.

=== Washington Wizards (2022–2023) ===
On February 10, 2022, Carey was traded, alongside Ish Smith, to the Washington Wizards in exchange for Montrezl Harrell. On April 10, Carey recorded a season-high 11 points, alongside seven rebounds, in a 108–124 loss to the Charlotte Hornets.

On March 1, 2023, Carey was waived by the Wizards.

=== Utah Jazz (2023) ===
On April 8, 2023, Carey signed with the Utah Jazz. After playing in 2023 NBA Summer League, he was released by the Utah Jazz.

=== Karşıyaka (2023–2024) ===
On August 30, 2023, Carey signed with Karşıyaka of the Turkish Basketbol Süper Ligi (BSL).

=== Rio Grande Valley Vipers (2025–2026) ===
In November 2025, Carey was named to the Rio Grande Valley Vipers roster for the 2025–26 season.

On August 25, 2026, Carey signed with Maxima Roma of the Italian Lega Basket Serie A (LBA). However, on September 11, 2026, he parted ways with the club.

== Career statistics ==
Legend
GP	Games played	GS	Games started	MPG	Minutes per game
FG%	Field goal percentage	3P%	3-point field goal percentage	FT%	Free throw percentage
RPG	Rebounds per game	APG	Assists per game	SPG	Steals per game
BPG	Blocks per game	PPG	Points per game	**Bold**	Career high

=== NBA ===
==== Regular season ====
Year	Team	GP	GS	MPG	FG%	3P%	FT%	RPG	APG	SPG	BPG	PPG
2020–21	Charlotte	**19**	**4**	6.1	.500	**.143**	.818	1.4	.1	.1	**.3**	2.4
2021–22	Charlotte	4	1	4.3	.500	—	.667	1.3	.0	**.3**	.0	2.0
2021–22	Washington	3	0	**9.0**	**.571**	—	.400	**2.3**	.0	**.3**	**.3**	**4.0**
2022–23	Washington	11	0	2.5	.250	—	**1.000**	1.0	.3	.2	.2	.5
Career		37	5	5.1	.474	.143	.654	1.4	.1	.1	.2	1.9

=== College ===
Year	Team	GP	GS	MPG	FG%	3P%	FT%	RPG	APG	SPG	BPG	PPG
2019–20	Duke	31	30	24.9	.577	.381	.670	8.8	1.0	.7	1.6	17.8

== Personal life ==
Carey is the son of Latavia and Vernon Carey, who played with the NFL's Miami Dolphins from 2004 to 2011. His younger brother Jaylen plays basketball for the University of Missouri.

== See also ==
- List of All-Atlantic Coast Conference men's basketball teams
