= Bill Cornwall =

American chess coach, educator, and journalist

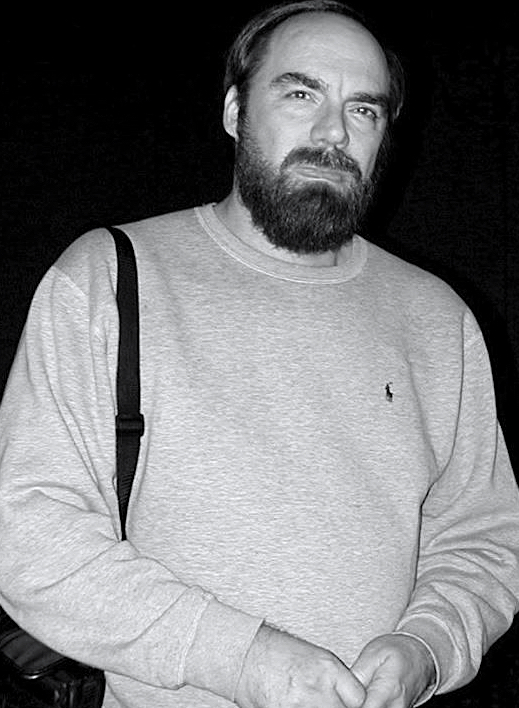
- Born: July 4, 1943 (age 83); Las Vegas, Nevada
- Citizenship: American
- Education: University School of Nova Southeastern University
- Occupation: Chess coach

William Cornwall (born July 4, 1943) is an American chess coach, educator, and journalist best known for his long-running weekly chess column, "Chess: A Knight's Tour".

== Chess Background ==
Cornwall was born in Las Vegas, Nevada and began playing chess at the age of eight. In 1972, Cornwall earned the title of National Master. In his years as a rated U.S. Chess Federation (USCF) Expert, Cornwall won the World Open Expert Championship (1982), National Open Expert Championship (1983) and U.S. Expert Championship (1989). He is a two-time U.S. Open Expert Champion (1989 and 1990). He also was the winner of the Philadelphia Open Championship (1969) and the Washington D.C. Championship (1969). While serving in the U.S. Army, he tied for first in the U.S. Army Chess Championship in 1970 and was awarded the Brilliancy Prize for his play in the U.S. Armed Forces Chess Championship that year. In 1988, Cornwall became the official Florida State Chess Champion.

== Teaching and Advocacy ==
Cornwall served in the U.S. Army as an Avionics Instructor from 1969 to 1972. After completing his service, he began teaching chess for income. In 1988, he established Cornwall Chess Services (CCS), a chess education business based in South Florida where he lived. CCS provided regular classroom chess training for over a dozen independent schools.

Many of Cornwall's students have achieved national recognition for their high rankings and achievements in the game of chess. They have placed first in the U.S. Elementary Championship, the National Grade Championships, and numerous Florida State Championships at the Elementary, Junior High, and High School divisions. A.J. Steigman, one of his personally-trained students and U.S. Junior Open Championship winner, became a Master at 13 and was rated number one for his age in the U.S. eight years in a row. Under Cornwall's instruction, the University School of Nova Southeastern University won the National Elementary Chess Team Championship and placed first in the Florida Elementary Team Championship 8 consecutive times.

As a certified USCF Senior Chess Tournament Director, Cornwall has been an active tournament organizer and director for both regional and national competitions. He served as the Assistant Director of the Closed U.S. Championship in 1994 and Closed U.S. Women's Chess Championship in 1991. Cornwall has been a major contributor to the development of chess in the state of Florida, having organized and served as tournament director for most of South Florida's regular chess tournaments and championships from 1989 to 1997. As a Florida delegate to the U.S. Chess Federation, he served on the USCF's Chess in Education Committee, the Rules Committee, and as U.S. Regional Vice President for the Southeastern U.S. Region.

In 1991, the USCF awarded Cornwall a special citation for his efforts in attracting more people to the game of chess.

In 2014, Cornwall began working as a Senior Instructor with Sunil Weeramantry of the National Scholastic Chess Foundation (NSCF) to train-teachers to teach-chess. Since inception, the pair have trained hundreds of South Florida teachers in workshops.

== Journalist ==
Cornwall has been a national award-winning chess columnist for over 24 years. His involvement with writing began as a teenager when he served as the editor and contributor to his high school's literary magazine. In 1984, he became the editor of Checkmate!, the official Florida State Chess Association publication that he created. His "Chess: A Knight's Tour" column has been published (bi-weekly & weekly) for over 24 years by the Tribune Publishing Company; first in the South Florida Sun-Sentinel (1993-2016) and then the Los Angeles Times (2010–Present). The column is the 4-time winner of the Chess Journalists of America's "Best Newspaper Chess Column" award and a 13-time recipient of the "Best Newspaper Chess Column of Local Interest" award.
