= Taylor Hendricks =

American basketball player (born 2003)

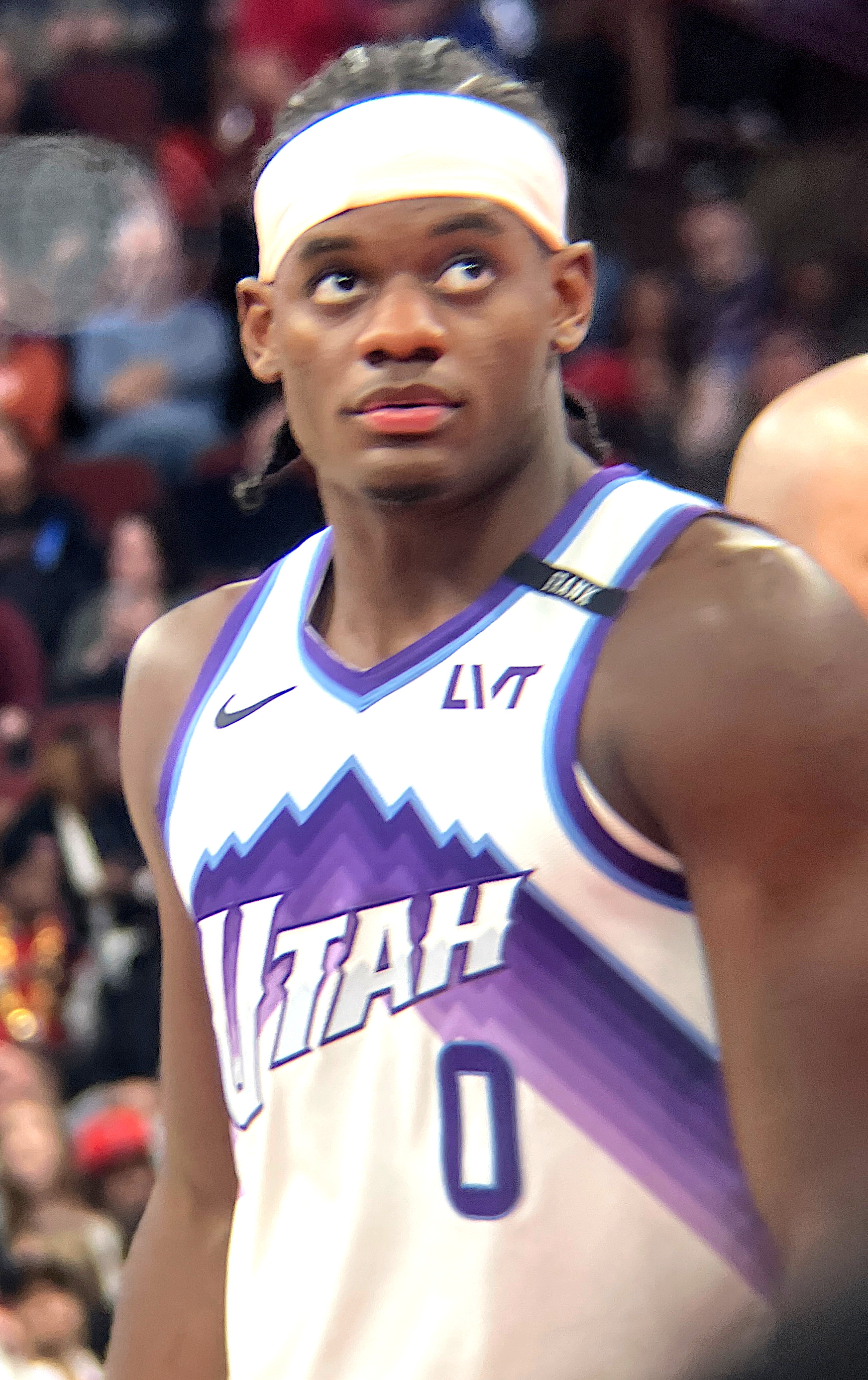
- Hendricks with the Utah Jazz in 2026

No. 22 – Memphis Grizzlies
- Position: Power forward
- League: NBA

Personal information
- Born: November 22, 2003 (age 22) Deerfield Beach, Florida, U.S.
- Listed height: 6 ft 9 in (2.06 m)
- Listed weight: 215 lb (98 kg)

Career information
- High school: NSU University School (Davie, Florida); Calvary Christian Academy (Fort Lauderdale, Florida)
- College: UCF (2022–2023)
- NBA draft: 2023: 1st round, 9th overall pick
- Drafted by: Utah Jazz
- Playing career: 2023–present

Career history
- 2023–2026: Utah Jazz
- 2023–2025: →Salt Lake City Stars
- 2026–present: Memphis Grizzlies

Career highlights
- Second-team All-AAC (2023); AAC All-Freshman Team (2023)
- Stats at NBA.com
- Stats at Basketball Reference

Taylor Thomas Hendricks (born November 22, 2003) is an American professional basketball player for the Memphis Grizzlies of the National Basketball Association (NBA). He played college basketball for the UCF Knights. As a freshman, he was a Second-team All-AAC and AAC All-Freshman Team selection. He was a three-time Florida High School Athletic Association (FHSSA) champion.

== Early life ==
Hendricks grew up in Fort Lauderdale, Florida and initially attended NSU University School. The 2018–19 University team with, which included Vernon Carey Jr., Scottie Barnes, Jace and Jett Howard, successfully defended its FHSSA Class 5A State championship with a victory over Andrew Jackson High School, despite Carey being sidelined for the championship game. He transferred to Calvary Christian Academy after his sophomore year. Hendricks averaged 14.1 points, 9.1 rebounds, and 2.1 blocks per game during his junior season while Calvary Christian won the Florida 3A state championship. As a senior, he was named the Broward County Player of the Year after averaging 15.1 points and 8.2 rebounds per game as Calvary Christian repeated as state champions. Hendricks was rated a four-star recruit and committed to playing college basketball for UCF over offers from the likes of Florida, Florida State, Miami (Florida), LSU, Memphis, and Iowa State. His commitment made him the highest-ranked recruit in UCF history.

== College career ==
Hendricks entering his freshman season at UCF was not seen as an NBA prospect. He started as the Knights' starting power forward. On November 8, 2022, he opened the season with a 23-point, 2-steal and 3-block effort against UNC Asheville. He was named the American Athletic Conference (AAC) Rookie of the Week for a conference record four consecutive weeks (November 21 through December 12). The only other player to win the American Athletic Conference Rookie of the Week award three weeks in a row was Austin Nichols. When Hendricks won his sixth American Athletic Conference Rookie of the Week on January 16, 2023, he tied Jalen Duren, Precious Achiuwa and Dedric Lawson for the conference single-season record. On February 6, Jarace Walker won his sixth AAC Rookie of the Week award, tying the group. Hendricks won for a seventh (February 13), eighth (February 27), and ninth time (March 6) to move ahead of the pack and up his career-high to 25 points on February 26 against the Tulsa. Hendricks was named to the All-AAC 2nd team and the All-Freshman team. Following the end of the season he entered the 2023 NBA draft and signed with an agent, forgoing the remainder of his college eligibility.

== Professional career ==
=== Utah Jazz (2023–2026) ===
The Utah Jazz selected Hendricks with the ninth overall pick in the 2023 NBA draft. Hendricks became the highest NBA draft pick, the first lottery pick, and the first one-and-done player in UCF history. Hendricks scored a career-high 12 points against the Sacramento Kings on December 16, 2023. On March 2, he posted a career-high 13 rebounds against the Miami Heat. On March 17, he posted his first NBA double-double with 10 rebounds and 15 points against the Minnesota Timberwolves. Hendricks made 40 appearances (23 starts) for the Jazz in his rookie campaign, averaging 7.3 points, 4.6 rebounds, and 0.8 assists.

On October 28, 2024, Hendricks suffered a fractured right fibula and dislocated ankle in a game against the Dallas Mavericks. The injury caused him to miss the remainder of the 2024–25 NBA season. Hendricks made three starts for Utah prior to suffering the injury, logging averages of 4.7 points, 5.0 rebounds, and 0.7 assists.

Hendricks made 33 appearances (six starts) for the Jazz during the 2025–26 NBA season, averaging 4.9 points, 3.0 rebounds, and 0.7 assists. On December 7, 2025, he posted a career high 20 points against the Oklahoma City Thunder. On December 23, he posted a new career-high 21 points against the Memphis Grizzlies.

=== Memphis Grizzlies (2026–present) ===
On February 3, 2026, Hendricks, Kyle Anderson, Walter Clayton Jr., Georges Niang, and three first-round draft picks were traded to the Memphis Grizzlies in exchange for Jaren Jackson Jr., John Konchar, Jock Landale, and Vince Williams Jr.

== Personal life ==
Hendricks is the son of Danielle Hendricks. He has two brothers, Tyler, who plays at UVU and Jamal Jones.

== Career statistics ==
Legend
GP	Games played	GS	Games started	MPG	Minutes per game
FG%	Field goal percentage	3P%	3-point field goal percentage	FT%	Free throw percentage
RPG	Rebounds per game	APG	Assists per game	SPG	Steals per game
BPG	Blocks per game	PPG	Points per game	**Bold**	Career high

=== NBA ===
Year	Team	GP	GS	MPG	FG%	3P%	FT%	RPG	APG	SPG	BPG	PPG
2023–24	Utah	**40**	**23**	21.4	.450	**.379**	**.793**	4.6	.8	.7	.8	7.3
2024–25	Utah	3	3	**25.0**	.222	.250	.750	**5.0**	.7	**1.7**	**1.3**	4.7
2025–26	Utah	33	6	14.9	.453	.343	.719	3.0	.7	.4	.2	4.9
2025–26	Memphis	26	11	24.1	**.463**	.342	.650	4.7	**1.2**	1.4	.8	**10.6**
Career		102	43	20.1	.449	.354	.714	4.1	.9	.8	.6	7.3

=== College ===
Year	Team	GP	GS	MPG	FG%	3P%	FT%	RPG	APG	SPG	BPG	PPG
2022–23	UCF	34	34	34.7	.478	.394	.782	7.0	1.4	.9	1.7	15.1
