= Achilles / Engineer =

Achilles/Engineer

Studio album by Achilles and Engineer
- Released: February 15, 2005
- Recorded: 2004
- Studio: Hopewell Recording Studio, Canandaigua, New York; More Sound Studio, Syracuse, New York
- Genre: Hardcore, experimental rock, metalcore, sludge metal
- Length: 26:17
- Label: Hex Records
- Producer: Achilles, Jason Randall

Achilles chronology
Achilles (2004)	Achilles/Engineer (2005)	The Dark Horse (2005)

Engineer chronology
Suffocation of the Artisan (2004)	Achilles/Engineer (2005)	Reproach (2006)

Alternative cover

Achilles/Engineer, released on February 15, 2005, through Hex Records, is a split album from Rochester-based hardcore band Achilles and Syracuse-based sludge metal band Engineer. For both bands it is the follow-up to their debut extended plays; Achilles by Achilles and Suffocation of the Artisan by Engineer. The album is split over two discs, where there bands have a disc each.

Achilles' participating songs were originally recorded with the intent for a split album with This Ship Will Sink, set for release during fall 2004. For unknown reasons, the release was cancelled and the songs were used for this split album instead.

== Track listing ==
Disc one: Achilles
No.	Title	Length
1.	"Passing Into Shadow"	2:24
2.	"The Ritual"	2:33
3.	"The Ritual II"	2:09
4.	"Save Nothing"	2:51
5.	"Dialed In"	1:37
Total length:		11:34

Disc two: Engineer
No.	Title	Length
1.	"Evacuating"	1:08
2.	"The Great Mistake"	1:36
3.	"Televascular"	4:11
4.	"Decades"	3:12
5.	"Covered and Calloused"	2:34
6.	"Untitled"	2:02
Total length:		14:43

== Personnel ==
Achilles

- Rory van Grol – vocals, production
- Rob Antonucci – guitar, album artwork, design, production
- Josh Dillon – bass guitar, production
- Chris Browne – drums, production

Studio personnel – Achilles

- Dave Drago – engineering, mixing, mastering

Engineer

- Bob Gorham – vocals
- Ryan Gorham – guitar, backing vocals
- Brad Gorham – bass guitar, backing vocals
- Mike AuClair – drums

Studio personnel – Engineer

- Jason "Jocko" Randall – production, engineering, mixing, mastering

Additional personnel

- Shawn Carney – photography

== Release history ==
Region	Date	Label	Format	Catalog #	Ref.
United States	February 15, 2005	Hex Records	CD (digipak)	HR010	

== Details ==
- Recording and mastering studio; Achilles: Hopewell Recording Studio, Canandaigua, New York
- Recording and mastering studio; Engineer: More Sound Studio, Syracuse, New York
- Distributor: Lumberjack Mordam Music Group
- Recording type: studio
- Recording mode: stereo
- SPARS code: n/a
