= Engineer (band) =

American sludge metal band

- Origin: Syracuse, New York, U.S.
- Genres: Sludge metal; hardcore punk; metalcore
- Labels: Hex; Black Market Activities
- Members: Bob Gorham; Brad Gorham; Ryan Gorham; Mike AuClair
- Website: engineer.bandcamp.com

Engineer is an American sludge metal band from Syracuse, New York. Featuring the brothers Bob, Brad, and Ryan Gorham, as well as the drummer Mike AuClair, the band released their debut EP Suffocation of the Artisan in 2004 on Four Leaf Recordings. In 2005 they teamed up with Hex Records for a split release with labelmates Achilles. After touring the East Coast, and meeting Mike Hill (Anodyne) who ran Black Box Recordings, they released a split 7" with McCarthy Blacklist. Their follow-up record, Reproach, was released in January 2006 on Hex records. Signing to Black Market Activities in 2007, the band released The Dregs and Crooked Voices in 2007 and 2011, respectively.

Engineer's music has been labeled as sludge metal, hardcore punk and metalcore. The band's third studio album, Crooked Voices, experimented with inventive song structures and arrangements, while integrating a heavier emphasis on melody and noise rock elements.

== Band members ==
- Bobby Gorham - vocals
- Brad Gorham - bass
- Ryan Gorham - guitars
- Mike Auclair - drums

== Discography ==
Studio albums

- Reproach (2006)
- The Dregs (2007)
- Crooked Voices (2011)

Other releases

- Suffocation of the Artisan EP (2004)
- Achilles/Engineer (2005, with Achilles)
- McCarthy Blacklist split 7" (2005)
