= Jett Howard =

American basketball player (born 2003)

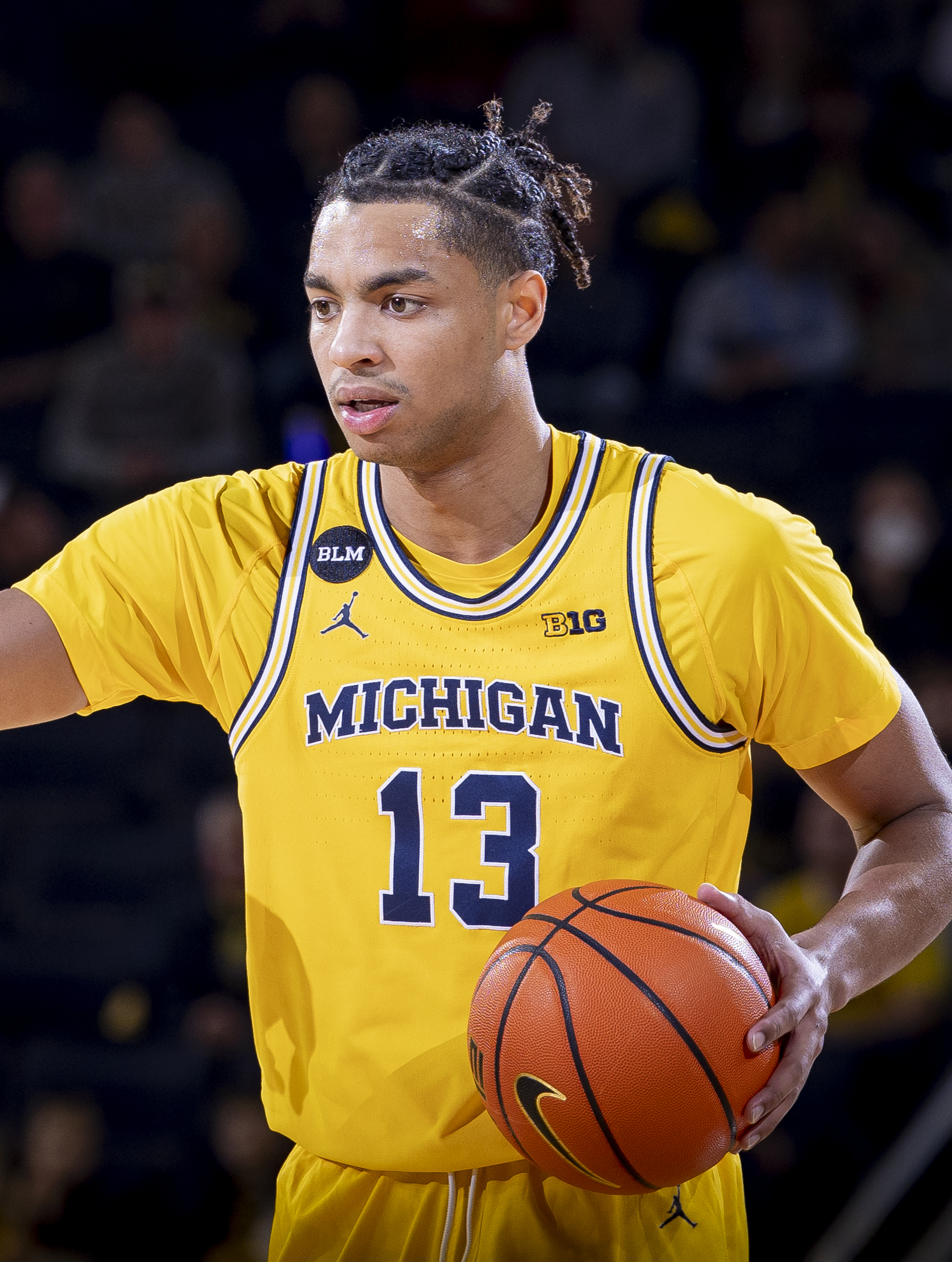
- Howard with the 2022–23 Michigan Wolverines

No. 9 – Dallas Mavericks
- Position: Shooting guard
- League: NBA

Personal information
- Born: September 14, 2003 (age 23) Chicago, Illinois, U.S.
- Listed height: 6 ft 8 in (2.03 m)
- Listed weight: 215 lb (98 kg)

Career information
- High school: NSU University School (Davie, Florida); IMG Academy (Bradenton, Florida)
- College: Michigan (2022–2023)
- NBA draft: 2023: 1st round, 11th overall pick
- Drafted by: Orlando Magic
- Playing career: 2023–present

Career history
- 2023–2026: Orlando Magic
- 2023–2024: →Osceola Magic
- 2026–present: Dallas Mavericks
- 2026–present: →Texas Legends

Career highlights
- Third-team All-Big Ten – Coaches (2023); Big Ten All-Freshman Team (2023)
- Stats at NBA.com
- Stats at Basketball Reference

Jett Howard (born September 14, 2003) is an American professional basketball player for the Dallas Mavericks of the National Basketball Association (NBA), on a two-way contract with the Texas Legends of the NBA G League. He played college basketball for the Michigan Wolverines, and was selected by the Orlando Magic 11th overall in the 2023 NBA draft. He is the son of former NBA player Juwan Howard, who was his head coach at Michigan.

In high school, he won a Florida High School Athletic Association (FHSAA) Class 5A State championship as a freshman at NSU University School. As a junior, he transferred to IMG Academy, where the team made back to back runs to the high school national final four. He was both a Jordan Brand Classic and an Iverson Roundball Classic honoree/participant.

== High school career ==
Jett Howard attended NSU University School for his freshman and sophomore seasons from 2018 to 2020, before transferring to IMG Academy for his junior and senior seasons from 2020 to 2022. His brother Jace played his junior and senior seasons with him for NSU University from 2018 to 2020. The 2018–19 NSU University team, which included Vernon Carey Jr., Scottie Barnes and Taylor Hendricks as well as the Howard brothers, successfully defended its FHSAA Class 5A State championship with a victory over Andrew Jackson High School, despite Carey being sidelined for the championship game. Howard participated in 3 USA Basketball Junior National Team minicamps as well as a USA U16 National Team training camp in 2018 and 2019.

At IMG, Howard and teammates Jaden Bradley and Michigan Wolverine commit Moussa Diabaté went to the 2021 Geico National Semifinals where they lost to Sunrise Christian Academy. Despite the loss, Paul Biancardi of ESPN described Howard as the "best shooter on the floor". With teammates Keyonte George and Jarace Walker, Howard and IMG lost the 2022 National semifinals to the Dariq Whitehead-led Montverde Academy.

Howard participated in the April 2022 Jordan Brand Classic despite being the 37th-ranked player and 11th-ranked player at his position in the national class of 2022. By May, Howard had slipped to the 40th slot in the National Class of 2022, but he excelled as the MVP of the Allen Iverson Roundball Classic despite the participation of seven top-20 players (George, Cason Wallace, Kel'el Ware, Walker, Brandon Miller, Arterio Morris and Anthony Black) on a 20-point 9-for-12 shooting performance. Iverson and J. R. Smith were among those who were impressed by Howard.

=== Recruitment ===
Despite having a major college basketball head coach (Juwan Howard) for a father, he pushed for a normal recruiting process. Howard had several offers from major conference schools, including four SEC schools (Florida, Tennessee, Vanderbilt and LSU) as well as Michigan, Georgetown and NC State. Howard visited Tennessee in September 2021 and almost committed to them. His inner circle for his decision making included his mother and aunt, who accompanied him on school visits, unlike his father who was competing for his commitment. On October 13, 2021, Howard committed to play for his father and with his brother Jace for the Michigan Wolverines men's basketball team. On November 13, 2021, Howard and other members of Michigan's class of 2022 (Gregg Glenn, Dug McDaniel and Tarris Reed Jr.) signed their National Letters of Intent.

College recruiting
Name	Hometown	School	Height	Weight	Commit date
Jett Howard; SF	Bradenton, FL	IMG Academy	6 ft 7 in (2.01 m)	220 lb (100 kg)	Oct 13, 2021
Jett Howard; SF	Recruit ratings: Rivals: 247Sports: ESPN: (87)				
Overall recruit ranking: Rivals: 46 (8 SG) 247Sports: 43 (14 SF) ESPN: 44 (13 SF)
Note: In many cases, Scout, Rivals, 247Sports, On3, and ESPN may conflict in their listings of height and weight.; In these cases, the average was taken. ESPN grades are on a 100-point scale.; Sources: "Michigan 2022 Basketball Commitments". Rivals.; "2022 Michigan Wolverines Recruiting Class". ESPN.; "2022 Team Ranking". Rivals.

== College career ==
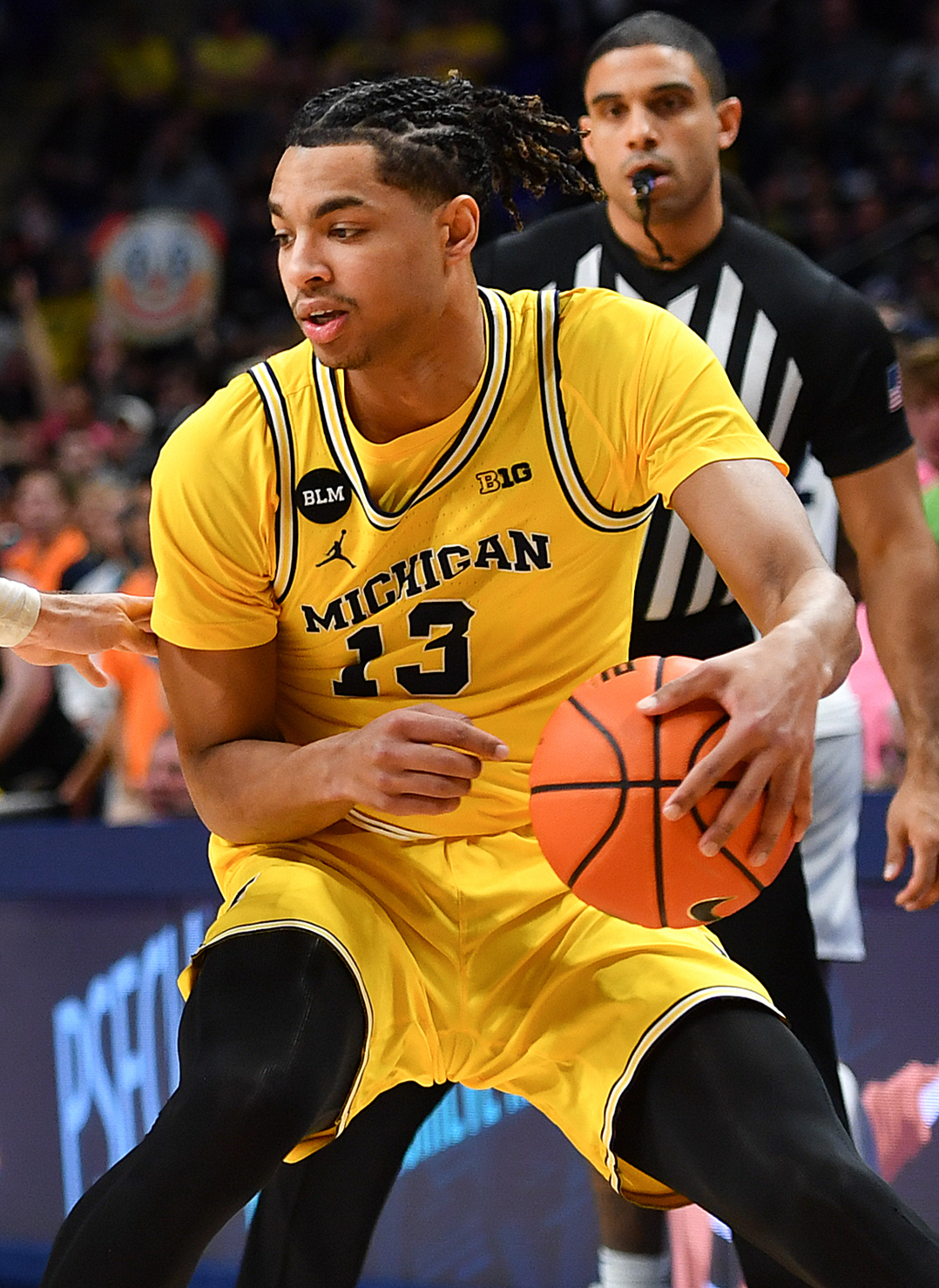
Howard with Michigan in 2023

Howard played his freshman season for the Michigan Wolverines. Michigan began the season on November 7, 2022, with a 75–56 victory over Purdue Fort Wayne. Howard contributed 21 points in his debut, becoming the first Wolverine to debut with 20-plus points since Jamal Crawford posted 21 on November 19, 1999. In his first week of play, he earned Big Ten Freshman of the Week recognition for the week ending November 13, 2022. By early January, he was being mentioned as a future 2023 NBA draft lottery pick. Howard posted a season-high 34 points on January 12, 2023, against Iowa, including Michigan's first 11 points and his first 5 three-pointers. Howard was Michigan's second-leading scorer with 14.2 points per game and led the Wolverines with 78 made three-pointers. Following the regular season, he earned All-Big Ten third-team recognition from the media and honorable mention recognition from the coaches as well as All-Freshman recognition from the coaches, marking the fifth consecutive season that Michigan has had an All-Freshman honoree following Moussa Diabaté, Hunter Dickinson, Franz Wagner and Ignas Brazdeikis. His 2.7 three-point shots made per game was second in the Big Ten.

On March 23, 2023, Howard announced he would forgo his remaining eligibility and declared for the 2023 NBA draft.

== Professional career ==
=== Orlando Magic ===
The Orlando Magic selected Howard eleventh overall in the 2023 NBA draft. Howard debuted against the Houston Rockets on October 25, posting an assist. In his next appearance, three games later on October 31 against the Los Angeles Clippers, he posted his first basket following a rebound. By November 20, Howard had only appeared in 5 of the team's first 13 games for just 4.6 minutes per game. Thus, the team assigned him to its G League affiliate, Osceola Magic. In his November 22, G League debut, he posted 34 points with 7 three-point shots made against the Rio Grande Valley Vipers at Bert Ogden Arena. Howard went back and forth between the NBA and the G-League posting 19 points in 39 minutes over his first 10 NBA appearances and averaging 24.5 points, 3.3 rebounds and 1.5 assists in his first six G League starts.

During the 2024 preseason, the Orlando Magic veterans showed inconsistent shooting while Howard shot well. Howard had the drawback of suspect defense. In the third game of the season on October 26, 2024, with Howard serving as Franz Wagner's primary backup, Howard posted 11 points in 11:33 of playing time against the Memphis Grizzlies. On November 3, in a loss to the Dallas Mavericks, Howard scored 12 points, just behind Wagner's team-high 13. On January 5, with the top four scorers (Wagner, Moe Wagner, Jalen Suggs and Paolo Banchero) for the Magic sidelined, Howard posted a career high 21 points against the Utah Jazz.

Prior to his third season, the Magic announced that they declined the team option for a fourth season. On November 23, 2025, Howard posted a career-high 30 points, including 22 in the 4th quarter as the shorthanded Magic (with 3 of their top 5 scorers sidelined for the game) cut a 26-point deficit down to 6 before losing 138–129 to the Boston Celtics. With Wendell Carter, Goga Bitadze, and Banchero all sidelined, Howard, Jase Richardson (18) and Noah Penda (13) all had career-high scoring performances.

=== Dallas Mavericks ===
On July 20, 2026, the Dallas Mavericks announced that they signed Howard to a two-way contract. Mavericks head coach, Dusty May, replaced Howard's father at Michigan and coached his older brother, Jace with the 2024–25 Michigan Wolverines men's basketball team.

== Career statistics ==
Legend
GP	Games played	GS	Games started	MPG	Minutes per game
FG%	Field goal percentage	3P%	3-point field goal percentage	FT%	Free throw percentage
RPG	Rebounds per game	APG	Assists per game	SPG	Steals per game
BPG	Blocks per game	PPG	Points per game	**Bold**	Career high

=== NBA ===
==== Regular season ====
Year	Team	GP	GS	MPG	FG%	3P%	FT%	RPG	APG	SPG	BPG	PPG
2023–24	Orlando	18	0	3.7	.333	.280	.500	.4	.3	.1	.1	1.6
2024–25	Orlando	**60**	0	11.7	.374	.296	.696	1.2	.7	**.2**	**.2**	4.5
2025–26	Orlando	55	0	**12.6**	**.418**	**.372**	**.949**	**1.6**	**.8**	**.2**	**.2**	**5.5**
Career		133	0	11.0	.392	.326	.833	1.2	.7	.2	.2	4.5

==== Playoffs ====
Year	Team	GP	GS	MPG	FG%	3P%	FT%	RPG	APG	SPG	BPG	PPG
2024	Orlando	**2**	0	**5.0**	.667	**1.000**	—	**.5**	**.5**	.0	.0	2.5
2025	Orlando	1	0	4.0	**1.000**	**1.000**	—	.0	.0	.0	.0	**6.0**
2026	Orlando	1	0	3.0	.000	.000	—	.0	.0	.0	.0	.0
Career		4	0	4.3	.571	.600	—	.3	.3	.0	.0	2.8

== Personal life ==
Howard was born in Chicago on September 14, 2003, to Jenine and Juwan Howard. His father had a 19-year career in the NBA before becoming the Michigan Wolverines basketball head coach at his alma mater, and was playing for the Orlando Magic at the time of Jett's birth. He was an NCAA All-American as well as an NBA All-Star and champion. His half-brother, Juwan Howard Jr. (son of Juwan Howard and MHSAA basketball champion Markita Blyden), was a two-time All-Horizon League 2nd team selection for the Detroit Titans in 2014 and 2015. His other half-brother, Josh Howard (son of Juwan Howard and Tabatha Johnson), played four years (2016–20) for the Brown Bears of Brown University. His brother Jace played at Michigan with him. His father is cousins with Angela Jackson, mother of NBA athletes Jalen McDaniels and Jaden McDaniels, making him second cousins with them.

== Acting ==
In the 2023 LeBron James biopic Shooting Stars, Howard portrayed Carmelo Anthony, as a high school rival of James.

== See also ==
- Michigan Wolverines men's basketball statistical leaders
