= A. J. Steigman =

American entrepreneur, chess player, and investment banker

A.J. Steigman
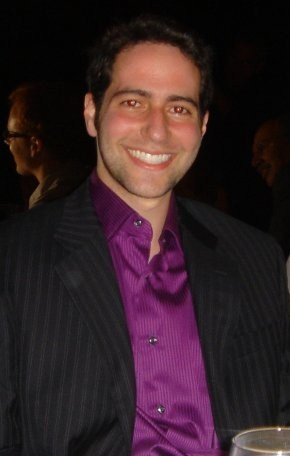
- Steigman in 2012
- Born: Allen Steigman; June 23, 1985 (age 41); Orlando, Florida
- Education: Emory University (BBA); Wharton School (MBA)
- Occupations: Investment banker, entrepreneur
- Organization: Steignet
- Title: Founder
- Website: steignet.com

Allen "A. J." Steigman (born June 23, 1985) is an American entrepreneur, chess player, and former investment banker. Steigman is currently CEO of Steignet.

== Biography ==
Steigman was born in Orlando, Florida, and grew up in Coral Springs, Florida. He attended University School of Nova Southeastern University for high school. In high school, Steigman contracted lyme disease and took a year off from school. He credits chess with helping his mind recover from the disease. Steigman went on to win in the 2002 US Junior Open one year after being diagnosed.

Steigman attended Emory University's Goizueta Business School. He was awarded the Goodrich C. White academic scholarship and was involved in student government as well as the development of Emory's award-winning chess program. He was known for playing simultaneous exhibitions involving as many as 40 individuals. He also attained a Master of Business Administration degree from the Wharton School of the University of Pennsylvania, and graduated with a triple major with honors.

Steigman has been an advocate of chess. He was a donor to the World Chess Hall of Fame and Sidney Samole Museum in Miami, Florida. He was also involved in a community service program where he played inmates in high security prisons.

== Chess career ==
A.J. Steigman learned chess at the age of 4, and played in his first tournament at age 5. He was coached by Bill Cornwall, a nationally known chess teacher and award-winning columnist. Steigman has numerous chess accomplishments such as: being ranked #1 in the U.S. for his age group for 8 years in a row (1993–2001), being awarded the title of Chess Master at age 13, being the first Floridian ever to make the All-America Chess Team of which he was a member for 8 years. Steigman won the 2002 U.S. Junior Open Championship and turned down a full scholarship to The University of Texas to attend Emory University.

Steigman was selected by the United States Chess Federation to represent the U.S. in international competitions. He represented the U.S. in the World Youth Championships in Sao Lourenco, Brazil (1995); Cannes, France (1997); and Oropesa del Mar, Spain (1999). Steigman's highest international performance was tying for 12th in the world in Cannes, France. He and Irina Krush of New York were the highest-scoring members of the 11-person U.S. team. Several years later, he traveled to the Pan-American Championships in Argentina (2001).

== Career ==
After college, Steigman worked as an investment banker for Merrill Lynch in New York City before deciding to become an entrepreneur. He opened a sneaker store at the Hard Rock Hotel and Casino in Hollywood, FL and established one of the top Nike Tier 0 accounts in the U.S. In 2010 he founded Soletron, a digital platform catering to streetwear consumers and sneakerheads, designed to facilitate a more direct interaction between consumers and independent brands. Steigman first came up with the concept for the company when he realized that accessory designers attempting to match out exclusive sneakers had difficulty in getting distribution in brick and mortar stores due to the retailers' limited square footage. Investors in Soletron included New York Angels, Easton Capital, and super angel Jim Estill of Canrock Ventures. Soletron ranked in the top 99.7% of all sites worldwide on internet traffic. The company's Advisory Board consisted of: Bruce Chizen (Former CEO of Adobe Systems), Santonio Holmes, Tom Austin (Founder of AND1), John Friedman, and Bob Rice (Founder of Tangent Capital and Bloomberg Contributor).

In July 2012, Steigman challenged Billionaire Peter Thiel to a $1mm chess match for an investment in Soletron. Steigman wanted to convey to fellow entrepreneurs to look for unconventional fundraising tactics in tough economic climates. Steigman proposed that if he won, Thiel would invest in Soletron's Series A financing, while if he lost, then Thiel would win a stake in the company. Both Thiel and Steigman are lifetime chess masters. The proposed event by Steigman received international syndication.

Soletron was acquired in July 2014 by the world's largest global streetwear retailer Karmaloop, for an undisclosed amount.

In 2017, Steigman founded PropTech company Steignet.com while attending Wharton School of Business. The company was accepted into the 2017 VIP-X accelerator program and attracted initial seed funding from investors including Alan Potamkin, Chris Mundy, and the family of Stanley Middleman. In May 2022 The Wall Street Journal reported that in the state of Georgia, the Steignet technology platform had closed over $86MM in residential property transactions on behalf of clients in the previous year. The Atlanta Realtor Association named Steigman the #1 top producing residential real estate broker in Atlanta for 2021.
