= The Dark Horse (Achilles album) =

Studio album by Achilles
- Released: May 24, 2005
- Recorded: Headbanging Kill Your Mama Music in Louisville, Kentucky
- Genre: Hardcore, experimental rock, metalcore
- Length: 27:15
- Label: Hex Records
- Producer: Evan Patterson

Achilles chronology
Achilles/Engineer (2005)	The Dark Horse (2005)	Achilles/Seven Bowls of Wrath (2006)

Professional ratings
Review scores
Source	Rating
Allmusic	3.5/5 stars
Punknews.org	3.5/5 stars

The Dark Horse, released on May 24, 2005 through Hex Records, is the debut full-length studio album and third release from the Rochester-based hardcore band Achilles. It is the follow-up to the split album Achilles/Engineer and received mostly favourable reviews.

== Track listing ==
No.	Title	Length
1.	"Every Hour Wounds, the Last One Kills"	2:22
2.	"Ivory"	3:13
3.	"Over Our Heads"	3:04
4.	"The Dark Horse"	3:14
5.	"In Lights"	3:28
6.	"(Reprise)"	0:27
7.	"Wake Me When It Thunders"	4:16
8.	"Rushmore"	1:31
9.	"Talons"	3:36
10.	")))"	2:04
Total length:		27:15

== Personnel ==
Achilles

- Rory van Grol - vocals
- Rob Antonucci - guitar, album artwork, design, photography
- Josh Dillon - bass
- Chris Browne - drums

Studio personnel

- Evan Patterson - production, additional guitar
- Chris Owens - engineering

== Release history ==
Region	Date	Label	Format	Catalog #	Ref.
United States	May 24, 2005	Hex Records	CD	HR011	

== Details ==
- Recording studio: Headbanging Kill Your Mama Music in Louisville, Kentucky
- Distributor: Lumberjack Mordam Music Group
- Recording type: studio
- Recording mode: stereo
- SPARS code: n/a
