= INFA =

INFA is an initialism for:

- International Federation of Netball Associations, former name of International Netball Federation
- Informatica (stock ticker symbol), a software development company founded in 1993
- International Federation of Aestheticians
