= Hospice (Achilles album) =

Studio album by Achilles
- Released: May 8, 2007
- Recorded: January 6–14, 2007 at The Skylight Studio in Fairless Hills, Pennsylvania
- Genre: Hardcore, experimental rock, metalcore
- Length: 29:30
- Label: Hex Records
- Producer: Vince Ratti

Achilles chronology
Achilles/Seven Bowls of Wrath (2006)	Hospice (2007)

Professional ratings
Review scores
Source	Rating
Alternative Press	(4.5/5)
Punknews.org	4/5 stars

Hospice, released on May 8, 2007 through Hex Records, is the second full-length studio album and fifth release from the Rochester-based hardcore band Achilles. It is the follow-up to the somewhat unknown split album Achilles/Seven Bowls of Wrath and received mostly favourable reviews.

== Track listing ==
No.	Title	Length
1.	"Curtains"	2:07
2.	"Curtains (Continued)"	0:54
3.	"We Are Fixtures"	2:45
4.	"Dear Old Tyger That Sleeps"	2:31
5.	"To The Teeth"	2:43
6.	"Raping the Dead"	1:36
7.	"Standing Night"	3:03
8.	"Reprieve"	2:57
9.	"Swallow"	2:17
10.	"In These Stark Halls"	0:47
11.	"Sea Level"	3:22
12.	"The Cold Floor"	4:28
Total length:		29:30

== Personnel ==
Achilles

- Rory van Grol - vocals
- Rob Antonucci - guitar, layout design
- Josh Dillon - bass
- Chris Browne - drums

Studio personnel

- Vince Ratti - production, engineering
- Alan Douches - mastering

Additional personnel

- Shawn Carney - photography

== Release history ==
Region	Date	Label	Format	Catalog #	Ref.
United States	May 8, 2007	Hex Records	CD	HR016	
United States	July 30, 2009	Farewell Party Records	12" vinyl	FPR-004	

== Details ==
- Recording studio: The Skylight Studio in Fairless Hills, Pennsylvania
- Mastering studio: West West Side Music in New Windsor, New York
- Distributor: Lumberjack Mordam Music Group
- Recording type: studio
- Recording mode: stereo
- SPARS code: n/a
