= Soletron =

American e-commerce platform

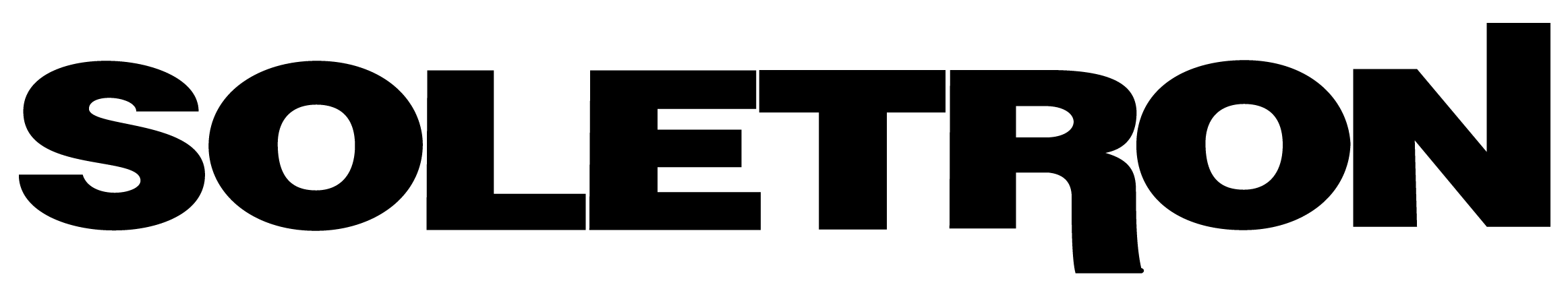
- Type: Private
- Industry: Streetwear
- Founded: 2010 in Fort Lauderdale, Florida
- Founders: A.J. Steigman; Shane Robinson
- Defunct: July 2014
- Fate: Acquired
- Headquarters: Fort Lauderdale, Florida, U.S.
- Website: www.soletron.com

Soletron was a social networking and ecommerce platform in lifestyle retail verticals. It is headquartered in Fort Lauderdale, Florida and holds offices in Philadelphia, New York City, and California. Their revenue model is similar to Etsy.

== Formation ==
Soletron was founded in September 2010 by former Merrill Lynch bankers A.J. Steigman and Shane Robinson with the goal of becoming a social networking and ecommerce company. In March 2011 they launched their blog and their app debuted in October 2011. Their ecommerce platform was established in December 2011.

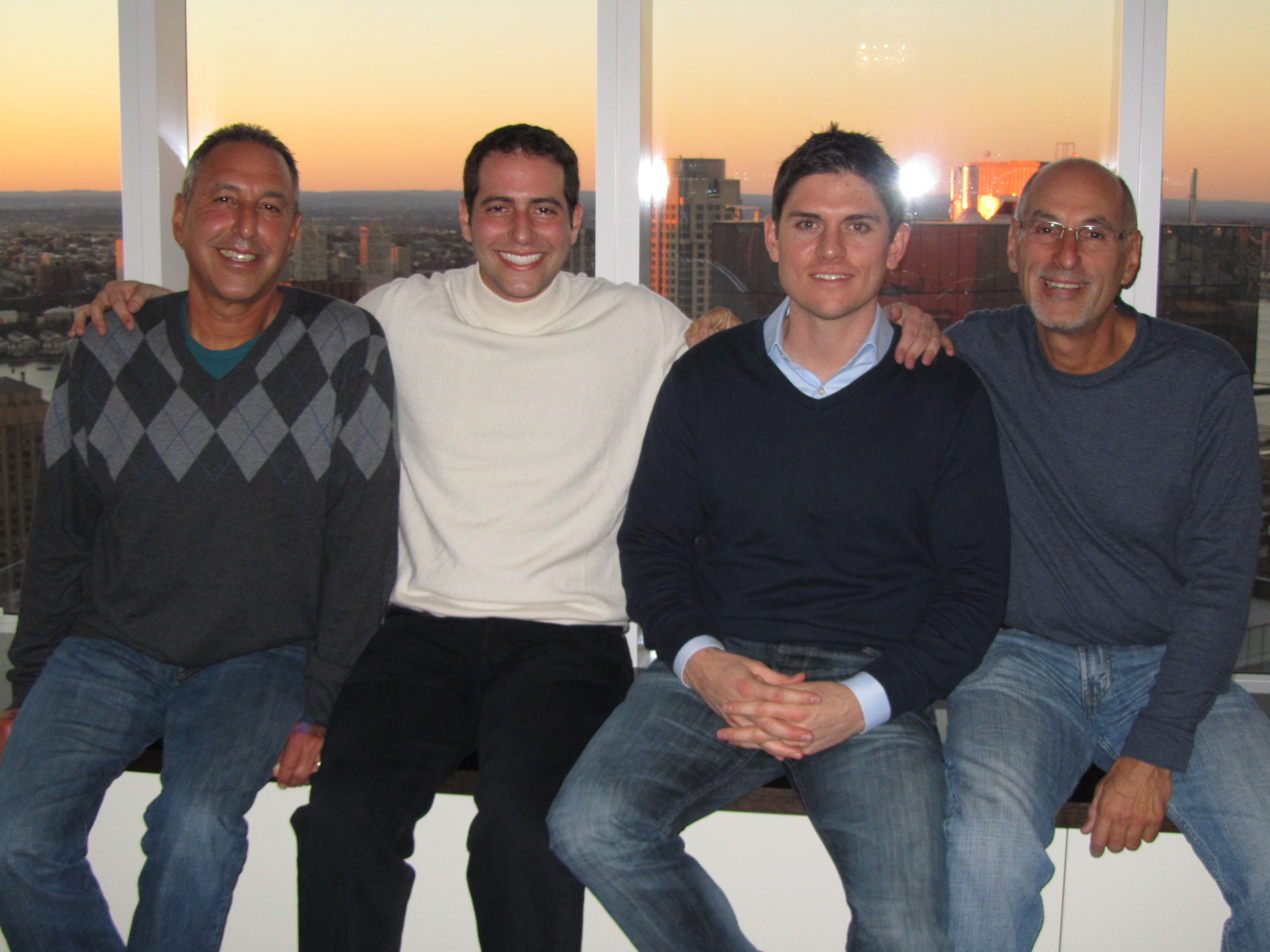
Soletron Founders A.J. Steigman and Shane Robinson with former CEO of Adobe and Soletron board member, Bruce Chizen

== General information ==
The Soletron platform is designed to facilitate the interaction between consumers and independent brands. Soletron has a structure similar to Etsy as it does not hold any inventory. Sellers sign up through the website to post their inventory online. Soletron introduces a social element to retail, allowing users to create profiles and follow brands or other members. They can also favorite products and share them with the online community. Soletron features a lifestyle blog meant to keep its visitors up to date on sneakerhead trends.

Soletron is known for launching the first-ever sneakerhead comic book as part of its marketing efforts and has been deemed a source of authority for the community. They cater mainly to sneakerheads and streetwear consumers, that are between the ages of 15–25.

In November 2012, the company transitioned into a full content platform for the youth community.

Soletron was acquired in July 2014 by its industry leader and the world's largest global streetwear retailer Karmaloop, for an undisclosed amount.

== Statistics ==
Soletron hosts as many as 300,000 unique monthly visitors and makes 9,000,000 impressions per month. This company has an online presence in over 200 countries. As of February 2013, the company had over 200,000 Twitter followers and 100,000 Facebook fans.

== Brands ==
Nooka and Dunkelvolk are two among dozens of brands featured on Soletron's e-commerce platform. Through these brands, they currently have over 1,200 products available on the site.

== Advisory board ==
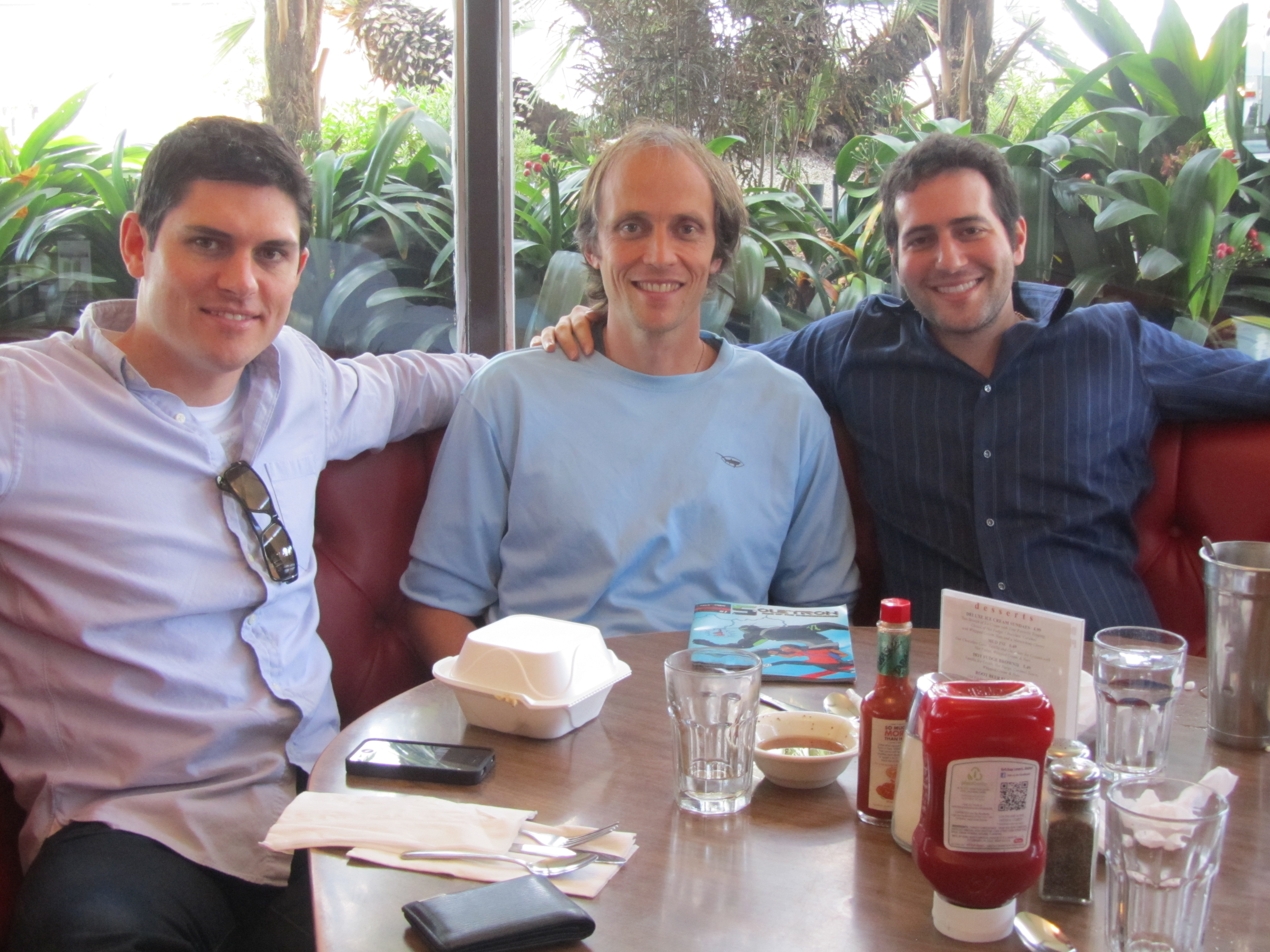
Soletron founders with AND1 co-founder and Soletron board member, Tom Austin

Soletron's advisory board consists of the following individuals:

- Bruce Chizen (Former CEO of Adobe Systems)
- Santonio Holmes (Super Bowl MVP and current member of the New York Jets)
- Tom Austin (Founder of AND1)
- John Friedman (Founder of Easton Capital)
- Bob Rice (Founder of Tangent Capital and Bloomberg Contributor)

== Press and accolades ==
Soletron has been highlighted in CNBC, Reuters, Huffington Post, Business Insider, and Bloomberg TV.
