= NSU University School =

College preparatory school in Florida, US

Location
- 3375 SW 75 Ave; Davie, Florida; United States; 26°4′43.5″N 80°14′48.6″W

Information
- Type: Private, day, college preparatory
- Religious affiliation: Nonsectarian
- Established: 1972
- Headmaster: William J. Kopas
- Faculty: 200
- Grades: JK-12
- Gender: Co-educational
- Enrollment: 1,850
- Average class size: 17
- Hours in school day: 7
- Campus size: 28 acres (11 ha)
- Campus type: Suburban
- Colors: Mako blue, silver, and black
- Athletics conference: Florida High School Athletic Association (FHSAA)
- Mascot: Fin
- Nickname: Sharks
- Newspaper: The Shark Sentinel
- Yearbook: Inner Visions
- Tuition: (K–12): $25,200–$36,100 (2024-25)
- Website: uschool.nova.edu

The NSU University School, commonly known as University School or simply U-School, is an independent college preparatory school in Davie, Florida, United States, that educates children in grades pre-K through grade 12. The school is on the Nova Southeastern University (NSU) campus. It is divided into lower, middle, and upper schools, representing national elementary, middle, and high school divisions. In 2015 William J. Kopas became its headmaster, replacing Jerome Chermak, who had been in the role for 16 years.

== Notable alumni ==
- Scottie Barnes, basketball player
- Lauren Book, member of the Florida Senate from the 32nd district
- Daniel Braverman, American football player
- Vernon Carey Jr., NBA pro basketball player Utah Jazz
- Zay Flowers, American football player
- Seth Gabel, actor
- Josh Gad, actor
- Taylor Hendricks, basketball player
- Jett Howard, basketball player
- Simone Johnson, professional wrestler currently signed to WWE
- Kenny McIntosh, American football player
- Skai Moore, American football player
- Matthew Pearl, novelist and educator
- Eric Reyes, soccer player for Puerto Rico national football team
- A. J. Steigman, competitive chess player, former investment banker, and CEO of Soletron
- Michael Waller, contemporary classical music and avant-garde composer
- Scott Weinger, actor best known for the voice of the title character in Aladdin (1992)
- Mike White, American football player
- Quincy Wilson, former New York Jets cornerback
