= Shantanu Narayen =

Indian-American business executive (born 1963)

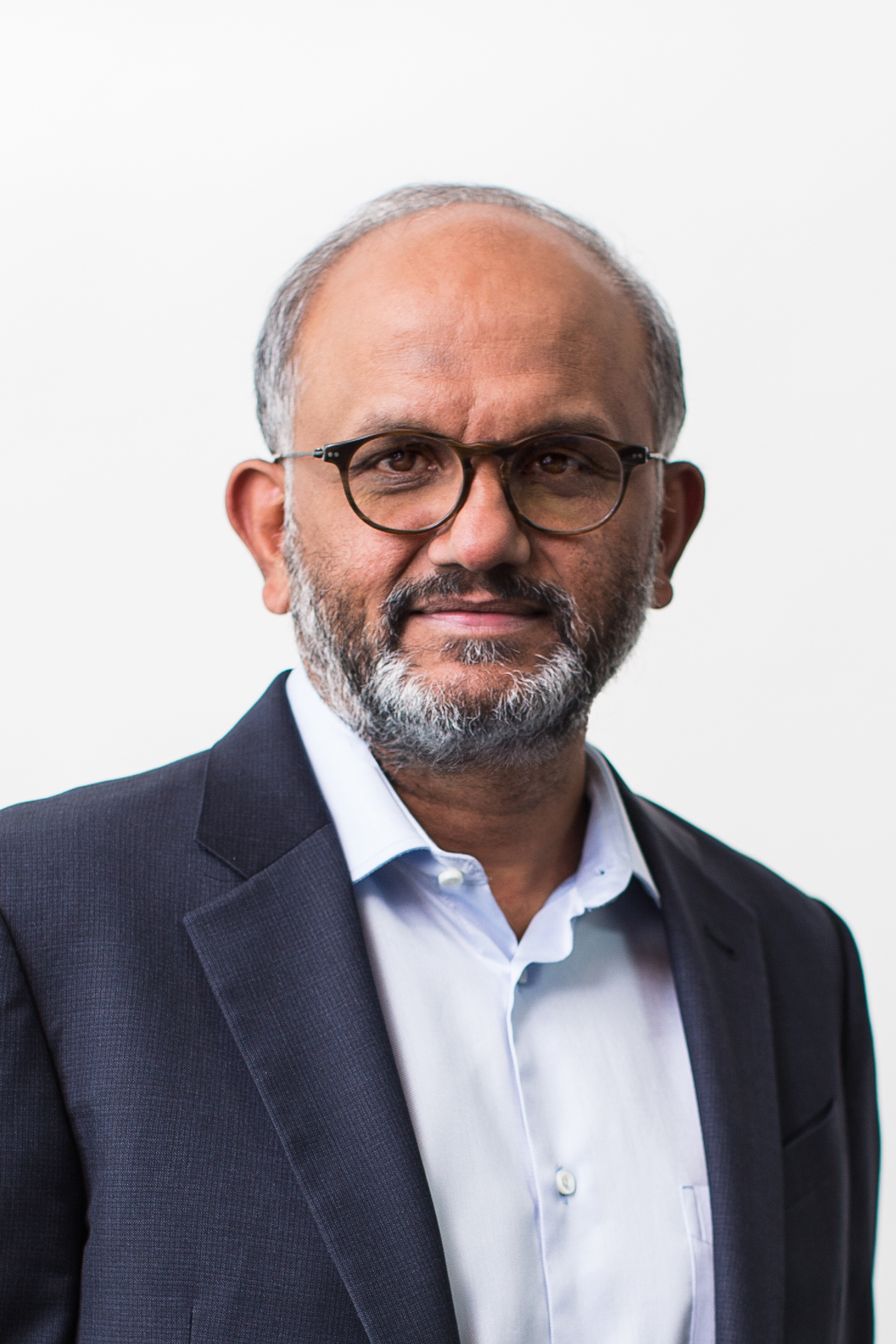
- Narayen in 2016
- Born: May 27, 1963 (age 63); Hyderabad, Andhra Pradesh, India
- Citizenship: American
- Education: Osmania University (BE); Bowling Green State University (MS); University of California, Berkeley (MBA)
- Title: Chairman and CEO of Adobe Inc.
- Predecessor: Bruce Chizen
- Board member of: Adobe Inc. Pfizer
- Honours: Padma Shri (2019)

Shantanu Narayen (born May 27, 1963) is an Indian-American business executive who has been the chairman, president, and chief executive officer (CEO) of Adobe Inc. since December 2007. Before this, he was the company's president and chief operating officer since 2005.

Narayen is a member of The Business Council.

== Early life and education ==
Narayen grew up in Hyderabad, India in a Telugu Hindu family. He is the second son of a mother who taught American literature and a father who ran a plastics company. Narayen attended Hyderabad Public School.

Narayen earned a bachelor's degree in electronics and communication engineering from University College of Engineering, Osmania University in Hyderabad. He moved to the United States to complete his education, and received a master's degree in computer science from Bowling Green State University in 1986. In 1993, Narayen received an MBA from the Haas School of Business, University of California, Berkeley.

== Career ==
=== Early career ===
In 1986, Narayen joined a Silicon Valley startup called Measurex Automation Systems, which made computer control systems for automotive and electronics customers. Narayen then moved to Apple, where he was in senior management positions from 1989 to 1995.

After Apple, Narayen was director of desktop and collaboration products for Silicon Graphics. In 1996, he co-founded Pictra Inc., a company that pioneered the concept of digital photo sharing over the Internet.

=== Adobe ===
Narayen joined Adobe in 1998 as senior vice president of worldwide product development, a position he held through 2001. From 2001 to 2005, Narayen was executive vice president of worldwide products. In 2005, he was appointed president and chief operating officer.

==== CEO ====
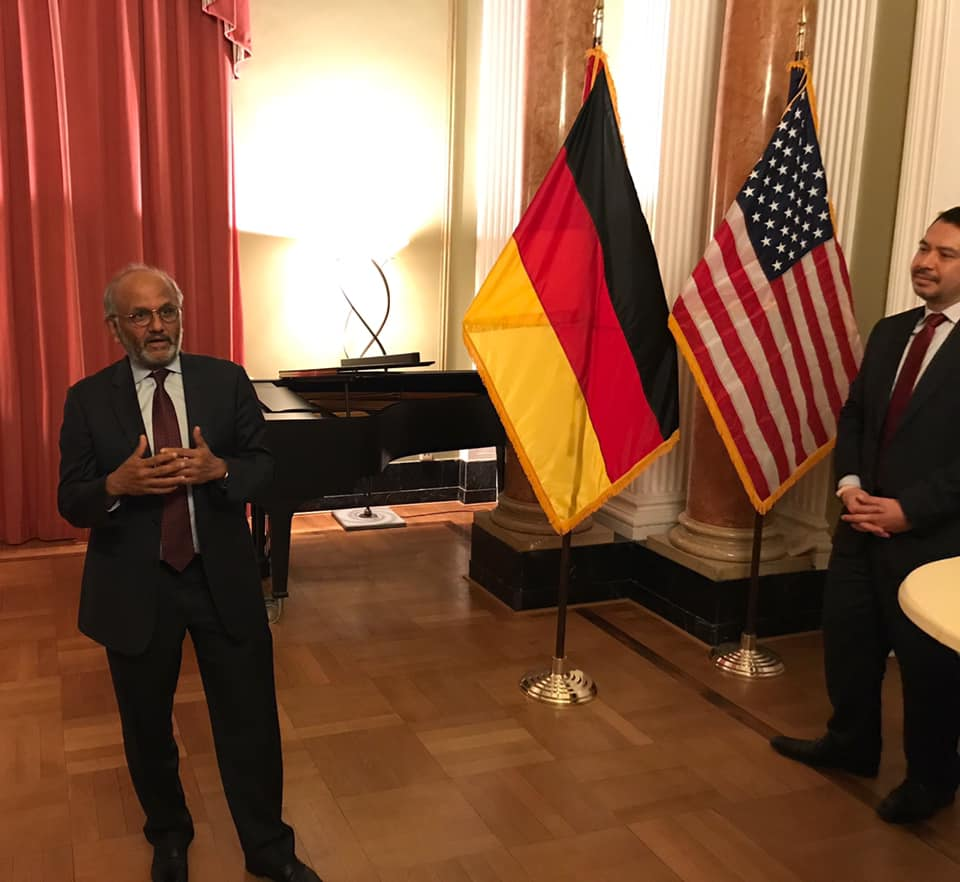
Narayen at the U.S. Consulate General Hamburg in 2019

In November 2007, Adobe announced that Bruce Chizen would step down as CEO effective December 1, 2007, to be replaced by Narayen.

As CEO, Narayen led the transformation of the company, moving its creative and digital document software franchises — which include flagship programs such as Photoshop, Premiere Pro, and Acrobat/PDF — from the desktop to the cloud. In addition, during his tenure as CEO, Adobe has entered the digital experiences category, an expansion which began with the company’s acquisition of Omniture in 2009.

In 2018, Adobe exceeded $100 billion in market cap and joined the Fortune 500 for the first time. That same year, it also ranked No. 13 on Forbes’ Most Innovative Companies list.

In 2011, Barack Obama appointed Narayen as a member of his Management Advisory Board. He is the lead independent director on the board of directors for Pfizer, and vice chairman of the US-India Strategic Partnership Forum.

Adobe was forced to abandon its $20 billion acquisition of Figma due to regulatory pressure, resulting in a $1 billion breakup fee paid by Adobe.

In 2023, Narayen's total compensation from Adobe was $44.9 million, up 42% from the previous year and representing a CEO-to-median worker pay ratio of 229-to-1. In 2026, Narayen announced that he would step down as CEO after a successor is named. In September 2026, Adobe announced that Anil Chakravarthy would succeed Narayen as president and CEO on December 1, when Narayen would become executive chair.

== Honors and awards ==
In May 2011, Narayen received an honorary doctorate from his alma mater, Bowling Green State University. In 2018, Narayen was ranked #12 on Fortune's "Businessperson of the Year" list, and was deemed "Global Indian of the Year" in 2018 by The Economic Times of India. In 2019, he was a recipient of India's Padma Shri award, and in 2022, Narayen was the recipient of Armenia's Global High-Tech Award.

== Personal life ==
Narayen lives in Palo Alto, California. He met his wife, Reni, while at Bowling Green State University in the mid 1980s; she has a doctorate in clinical psychology. They have two sons. Narayen once represented India in sailing at an Asian Regatta. He, along with Satya Nadella, has also invested in Major League Cricket to be hosted by the American Cricket Enterprises (ACE).
