= List of hospice programs =

Hospice is a type of care and a philosophy of care which focuses on the palliation of a terminally ill patient's symptoms.

== Africa ==
- Foundation for Hospices in Sub-Saharan Africa
- Global Partners in Care

== Europe ==
- Acorns Children's Hospice, non-profit in Birmingham, Walsall & Worcester of West Midlands, England
- Claire House Children's Hospice, non-profit in Bebington, Merseyside, England
- Demelza Hospice Care for Children
- Farleigh Hospice, non-profit in Chelmsford, Essex, England
- Grand Master of the Sacred Apostolic Hospice
- Hospice-Anthelme Verreau
- Hospice Comtesse, town museum in Lille, France
- Hospices de Beaune, museum in Beaune, Bourgogne, France
- Kirkwood Hospice, Huddersfield, West Yorkshire, England
- Linda Mbeki Hospice
- Martin House Hospice
- Royal Trinity Hospice, oldest in the United Kingdom
- St. Francis Hospice, Raheny
- Shooting Star Children's Hospices, non-profit in Hampton, London, England
- Sobell House Hospice, non-profit in Oxfordshire, Oxford, England
- Strathcarron Hospice, non-profit in Denny, Falkirk, Stirlingshire, Scotland
- St. Eloy's Hospice
- Trinity Hospice, Blackpool

== United States and Canada ==
- American Academy of Hospice and Palliative Medicine, professional organization in Glenview, Illinois
- Community Hospice of Northeast Florida, non-profit in Jacksonville, Florida
- Gentiva Health Services, national provider of hospice and home health services
- Hospice Palliative Care Ontario, professional organization in Ontario, Canada
- St. Francis Hospice, Hawaii, first hospice in the state, established in 1978
