= Informatica =

American software company

Informatica Inc.

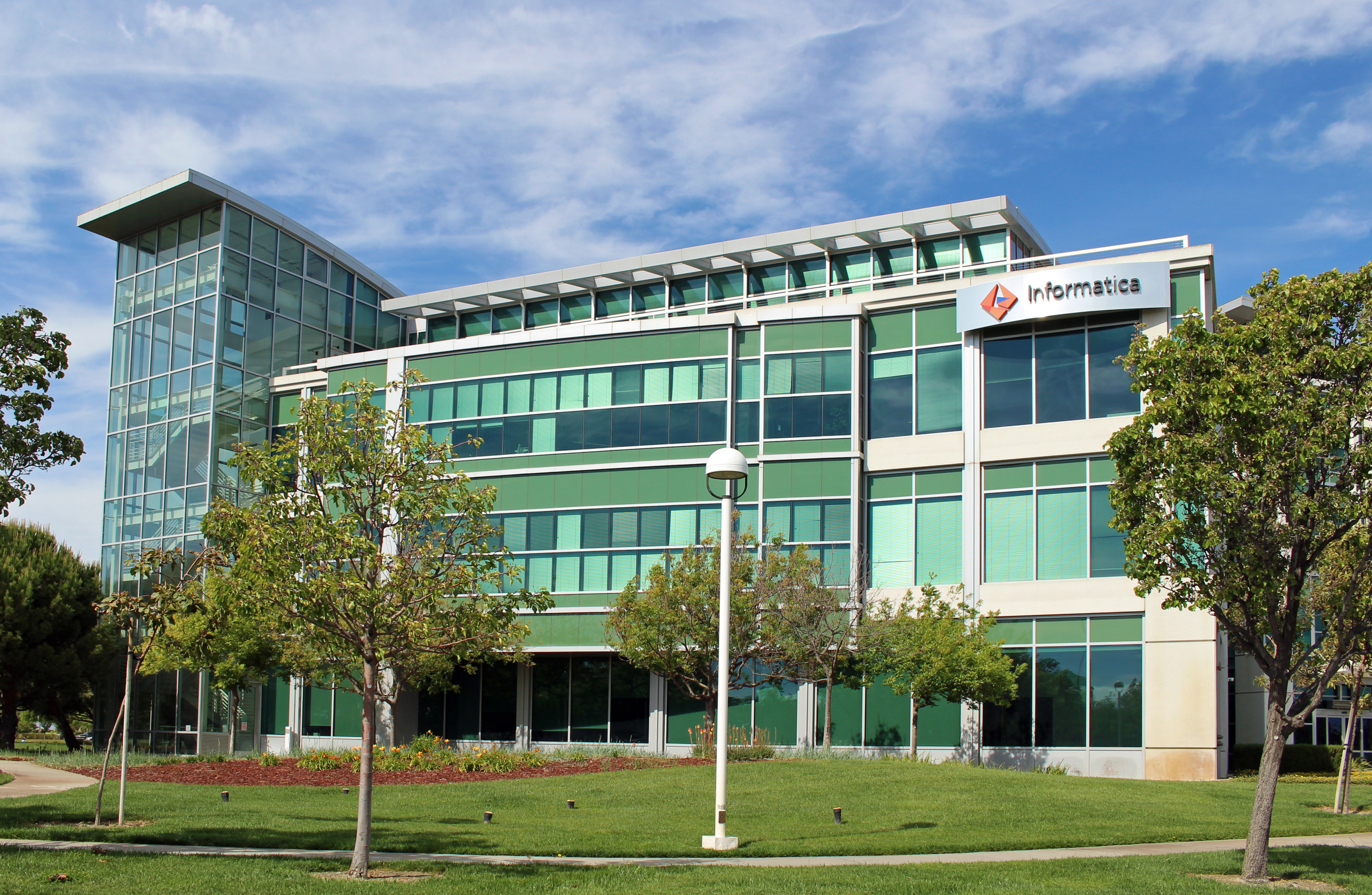
- Headquarters in Redwood City
- Type: Public
- Traded as: NYSE: INFA (Class A); Russell 1000 component
- Industry: Software
- Founded: 1993; 33 years ago
- Founders: Gaurav Dhillon; Diaz Nesamoney
- Fate: Acquired by Salesforce
- Headquarters: Redwood City, California, U.S.
- Key people: Amit Walia (CEO); Bruce Chizen (chair)
- Products: Data warehousing tools; ETL tools; Big data tools
- Revenue: ▲US$1.64 billion (2024)
- Operating income: ▲US$127 million (2024)
- Net income: ▲US$9.93 million (2024)
- Total assets: ▲US$5.28 billion (2024)
- Total equity: ▲US$2.31 billion (2024)
- Number of employees: 5,200 (2024)
- Website: informatica.com

Informatica Inc. is an American software development company founded in 1993 by Gaurav Dhillon and Diaz Nesamoney. Based in Redwood City, California, its core products include enterprise cloud data management and data integration.

== History ==
Informatica was founded in 1993 by Gaurav Dhillon and Diaz Nesamoney. On 29 April 1999, its initial public offering on the Nasdaq stock exchange listed its shares under the stock symbol INFA.

In April 2015, Permira and CPP Investments announced that a company controlled by their funds would acquire Informatica for approximately US$5.3 billion; this transaction was completed four months later, receiving investment from Microsoft and Salesforce Ventures as part of the deal.

On August 6 2015, its stock ceased trading on the Nasdaq. On 27 October 2021, Informatica again became publicly traded with the INFA stock symbol at about $10 billion enterprise value, this time listed on the NYSE, opening at $27.55 per share.

In November 2023, five months after acquiring Privitar, a data management tool, the firm announced a restructuring plan to focus on its cloud offerings. It permanently laid off 10% of its workforce and reduced its office space.

In April 2024, the Wall Street Journal reported that Salesforce was in advanced talks to acquire Informatica at a price below its $11 billion market capitalization at the time; the deal was eventually abandoned.

In May 2025, it was reported that the firm would be acquired by Salesforce for $8 billion. subject to regulatory approval. In November, it was announced that the acquisition had been completed.

== Products ==
Informatica's product portfolio is focused on data integration: extract, transform, load, information lifecycle management, business-to-business data exchange, cloud computing integration, complex event processing, data masking, data quality, data replication, data virtualization, master data management, ultra messaging, and data governance. These components form a toolset for establishing and maintaining data warehouses. It has over 9,500 customers.

In 2006, Informatica announced a "cloud business". In 2023 it announced an AI-powered data management tool and began to fully transition to cloud-based offerings.

== Financial results ==
	2014	2013	2012	2011	2010	2009
Revenue (USD in Millions)	1,047.954 M	948.171 M	811.571 M	783.779 M	650.076 M	600.999 M
Net Income (USD in Millions)	114.087 M	86.400 M	93.180 M	117.500 M	86.320 M	54.210 M

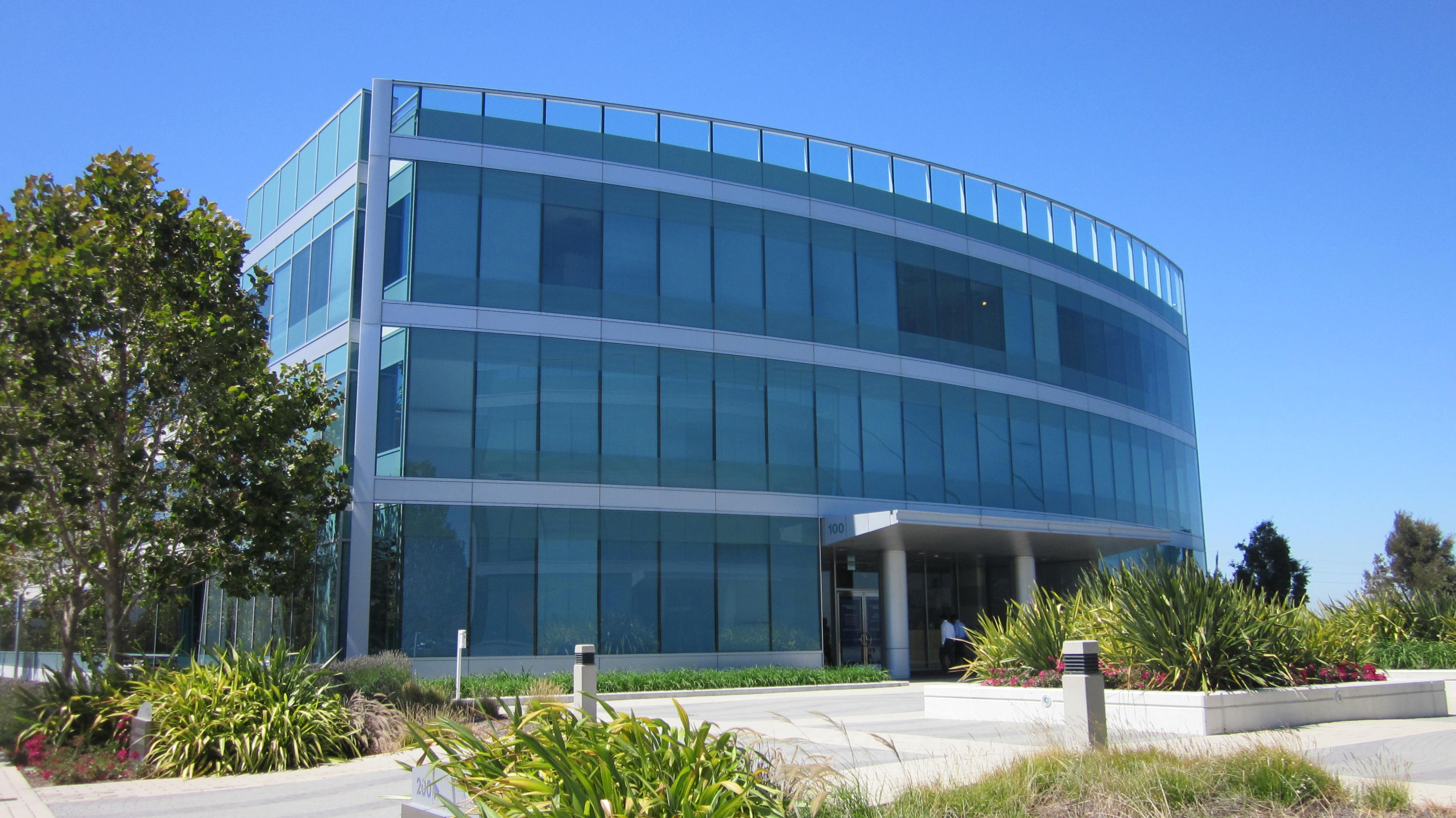
Former headquarters in Redwood City

Informatica has grown through a combination of sales growth and through company acquisitions.
