= Achilles (band) =

American punk band

- Origin: Rochester, New York, United States
- Genres: Hardcore punk, experimental rock, metalcore
- Years active: 2004 - present
- Labels: Hex Records, Farewell Party Records, Bloom Explode Records, Luchador Records
- Members: Rory van Grol; Rob Antonucci; Josh Dillon; Chris Browne
- Website: Bandcamp.com/achillesofrochester

Achilles is an American hardcore punk band from Rochester, Upstate New York, United States. Formed in 2004, the band currently consists of Rory van Grol (vocals), Rob Antonucci (guitar), Josh Dillon (bass) and Chris Browne (drums).

== History ==
Achilles formed in 2004, as a result of the demise of three local Rochester bands; Building on Fire, The Breaking Project and Standfast. Their primary influences are said to be Botch, Isis and Cave In, amongst others. Later in 2004, the band released a 5-song self-titled EP, which received fairly mixed reviews. They have since gone on to release two split albums; one with Engineer in January 2005 and one with Seven Bowls of Wrath in July 2006, as well as two full-length studio albums; The Dark Horse in May 2005, followed by Hospice in May 2007. Both full-length's received mostly favourable reviews.

They have in the past few years become less active than when they started, due to other commitments like vocalist Rory Vangrol's hardcore punk band Soul Control and drummer Chris Browne's post-hardcore/indie rock band Polar Bear Club, which both are signed to Bridge Nine Records. Despite these projects starting out as side projects, they have both evolved into full-time projects over the past two years. In April, 2007, guitarist Rob Antonucci became a father, leaving also him with less time to commit. They did a three-week tour in Europe in July 2006 with help from the European label Bloom Explode Records, who released their split album with Seven Bowls of Wrath just prior to the tour.

== Members ==
=== Current members ===
- Rory van Grol - Vocals (since 2004)
- Rob Antonucci - Guitar (since 2004)
- Josh Dillon - Bass (since 2004)
- Chris Browne - Drums (since 2004)
- Phil Speed - Guitar

== Discography ==
=== Studio albums ===
Year	Information
2005	The Dark Horse: Released: May 24, 2005; Label: Hex Records; Formats: CD
2007	Hospice: Released: May 8, 2007 (CD), July 30, 2009 (vinyl); Label: Hex Records (CD), Farewell Party Records (vinyl); Formats: CD, 12" vinyl

=== Extended plays ===
Year	Information
2004	Achilles: Released: Autumn, 2004; Label: Luchador Records; Formats: CD
2020	It Doesn’t Get Easier, It Just Changes • Released: March, 2020 • Label: Sore Ear • Format: 7” vinyl

=== Split albums ===
Year	Information
2005	Achilles/Engineer: Released: January 25, 2005; Label: Hex Records; Formats: CD
2006	Achilles/Seven Bowls of Wrath: Released: June 28, 2006; Label: Bloom Explode Records; Formats: 12" vinyl
