= List of Michigan Wolverines men's basketball head coaches =

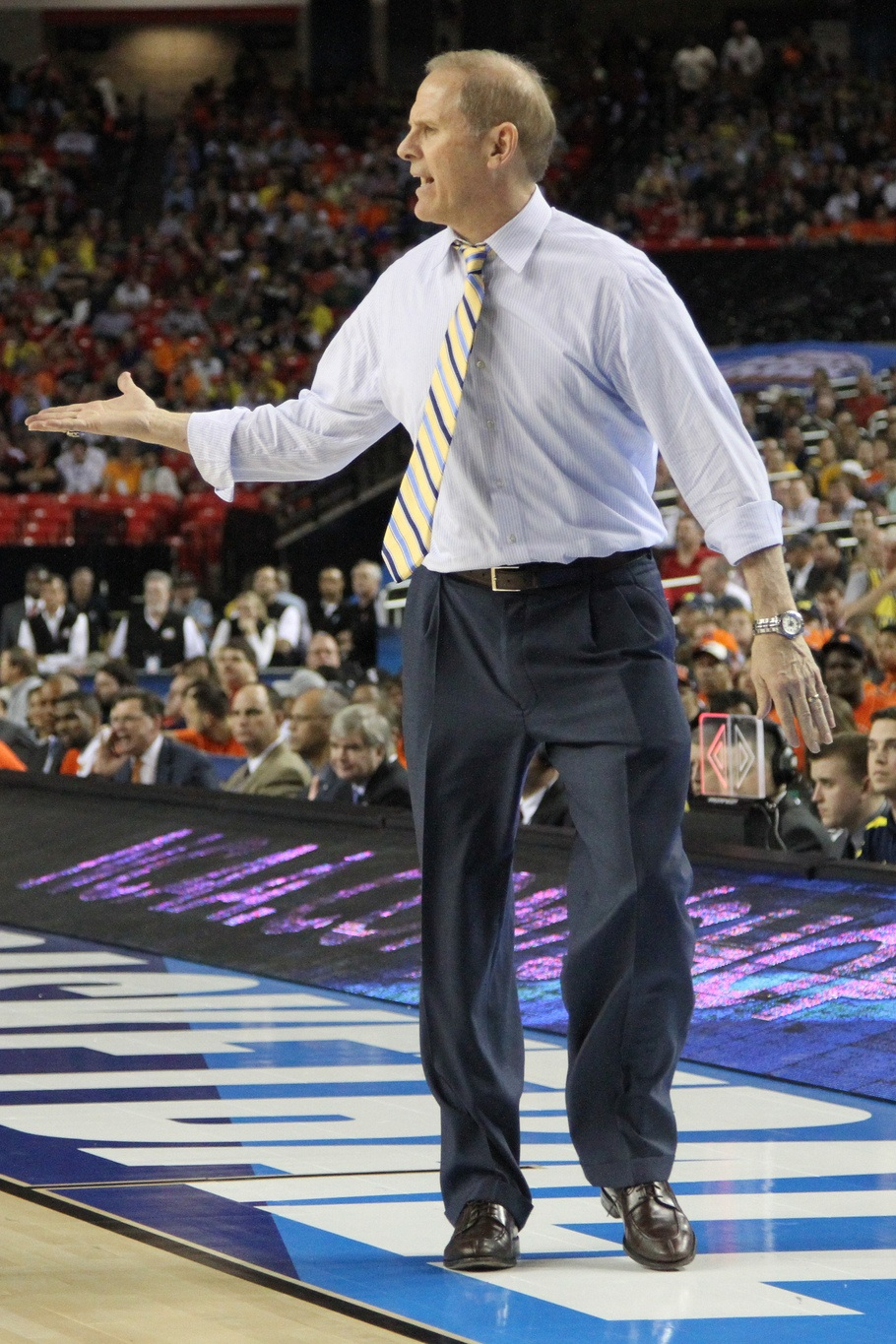
John Beilein in the 2013 NCAA tournament

The Michigan Wolverines men's basketball program is a college basketball team that represents the University of Michigan. The team plays at the Division I level of the National Collegiate Athletic Association (NCAA). They compete in the Big Ten Conference of the NCAA, where they have been since 1917. They play their home games at Crisler Center in Ann Arbor, Michigan, named after Fritz Crisler, a former head football coach at Michigan (1938–1947).

The men's team has had 19 head coaches in its history. The team has played in over 2,800^{1} games over 111 seasons of collegiate play from the 1908–09 season to the present (excluding 1910 to 1917, when the Wolverines did not play due to low attendance).

Steve Fisher was the first head coach to lead the team to an NCAA tournament championship, doing so in 1989, and Dusty May was the second, doing so in 2026. Fisher also led the team to six other NCAA Tournament appearances, including two runner-up finishes in 1992 and 1993, but the '92 and '93 Final Fours were later vacated as punishment for the Ed Martin scandal. Before Fisher, Bill Frieder had led the team to four consecutive tournament appearances. Nine coaches have led the team to Big Ten regular season championships: E. J. Mather, George Veenker, Ozzie Cowles, Dave Strack, Johnny Orr, Frieder, John Beilein, Juwan Howard, and May. Three coaches have led the team to a Big Ten tournament championship: Brian Ellerbe, Beilein and May. Beilein is the winningest head coach for the team, leading the team to two Big Ten Regular Season Championships in 2012 and 2014 and two Big Ten tournament Championships in 2017 and 2018. He has also led the team to nine NCAA tournament appearances, including eight times in nine years from 2011–19. During these appearances, he led the team to two runner-up finishes in the tournament in 2013 and 2018, two Elite Eight appearances in 2014 and 2018, and three consecutive Sweet Sixteen appearance from 2017–19. Juwan Howard led the Wolverines to a 2021 Big Ten Conference Championship and an Elite Eight, as well as Michigan’s fifth consecutive Sweet Sixteen appearance in 2022 (NCAA tournament cancellation in 2020). Dusty May won the 2025 Big Ten tournament championship in his first season and the 2026 Big Ten regular season championship and national championship in his second season.

== List of coaches ==
		Overall		Conference		
Coach	Years	Record	Pct.	Record	Pct.	Note
George D. Corneal	1908–09	1–4	.200			
Elmer Mitchell	1917–19	22–20	.524	5–15	.250	
E. J. Mather	1919–28	108–53	.671	64–43	.598	3 Western (Big Nine) Conference Championships (1921, 1926, 1927)
George Veenker	1928–31	35–12	.745	24–10	.706	1929 Western (Big Nine) Conference Championship
Frank Cappon	1931–38	78–57	.578	44–40	.524	
Bennie Oosterbaan	1938–46	81–72	.529	40–59	.404	
Osborne Cowles	1946–48	28–14	.667	16–8	.667	1948 Western (Big Nine) Conference Championship
Ernest McCoy	1948–52	40–47	.460	18–34	.346	
William Perigo	1952–60	78–100	.438	38–78	.328	
Dave Strack	1960–68	113–89	.559	58–54	.518	3 Big Ten Conference Championships (1964, 1965, 1966), 2 Final Fours (1964, 1965)
Johnny Orr	1968–80	209–113	.649	120–72	.625	2 Big Ten Conference Championships (1974, 1977), 1976 Final Four
Bill Frieder	1980–89	191–87	.687	98–64	.605	2 Big Ten Conference Championships (1985, 1986), 1984 NIT Championship
Steve Fisher	1989–97	184*–82* (108–53)	.692* (.671)	88*–56* (54–36)	.611* (.600)	1989 NCAA Tournament Championship, 3 Final Fours (1989, 1992*, 1993*), 1997 NIT Championship*
Brian Ellerbe	1997–2001	62*–60* (25–32)	.508* (.439)	26*–38* (10–22)	.406* (.313)	1998 Big Ten Tournament Championship*
Tommy Amaker	2001–07	109–83	.563	43–53	.448	2004 NIT Championship
John Beilein	2007–19	278–150	.650	126–92	.578	2 Big Ten Conference Championships (2012, 2014), 2 Big Ten Tournament Championships (2017, 2018), 2 Final Fours (2013, 2018)
Juwan Howard	2019–24	87–72	.547	49–48	.505	2021 Big Ten Conference Championship
Dusty May	2024–26	64–13	.831	33–7	.825	2026 NCAA Tournament Championship, 2026 Big Ten Conference Championship, 2025 Big Ten Tournament Championship, 2026 Final Four
Mike Boynton	2026–present	3–2	.600	0–0	–	
Total	1908–present	1770–1131* (1657–1074)	.610* (.607)	890*–771* (840–735)	.536* (.533)	

* Vacated by the NCAA

== Notes ==
^1 - Michigan had comprised an on-court record of 1656–1061 (.610), but records from the 1992 NCAA Tournament Final Four, 1992–93, 1995–96, 1996–97, 1997–98 and 1998–99 seasons were vacated due to the University of Michigan basketball scandal.
