= Bruce Chizen =

American businessman (born 1955)

Bruce R. Chizen
- Born: September 5, 1955 (age 71)
- Education: Brooklyn College (part of the City University of New York)
- Occupation: Business executive
- Years active: 1980–present
- Known for: Former CEO of Adobe Inc. (2000–2007)
- Board member of: McAfee; Oracle Corporation; Synopsys; ChargePoint; Informatica

Bruce R. Chizen (born September 5, 1955) is an American technology executive. He was the CEO of Adobe Systems from 2000 to 2007. A senior advisor at Permira, he is chairman of McAfee's board of directors.

== Early life and education ==
Bruce R. Chizen was born September 5, 1955. He grew up in Brooklyn, New York. His father owned a retail radio TV appliance store, and Chizen would work there on Saturdays. Majoring in health science, Chizen earned a B.S. from Brooklyn College (City University of New York) in 1978.

== Career ==
=== Mattel Electronics and Claris (1980-1994) ===
From 1980 to 1983, he worked in Mattel Electronics' merchandising group, helping it grow into a US$500 million business.

In 1983, Chizen joined Microsoft as the company's eastern region sales director.

He also worked at Claris Corporation. In 1987, he joined Claris as a founding senior manager and later held positions as vice president of sales and of worldwide marketing before becoming vice president and general manager of Claris Clear Choice.

In 1994 Aldus Corporation hired Chizen to run its consumer division in San Diego (what was formerly Silicon Beach Software). Later that year, Aldus was acquired by Adobe Systems and Chizen became vice president and general manager of consumer products.

=== Adobe CEO (2000-2008) ===
He joined Adobe in 1994. He was named CEO of Adobe in 2000, working out of San Jose, California. He was also president from 2000 to 2005, and acting CFO from 2006 to 2007. He held the CEO role until 2007. Notably, as CEO he oversaw the acquisition of Macromedia in 2005 for $3.4 billion in stock. In an interview, Chizen stated that the primary reason for acquiring Macromedia was to get Flash.

During his 14 years at the company, Chizen engaged in transforming Adobe from a developer of graphics and publishing software into a leading diverse supplier of design, media, and business tools. On November 12, 2007, Adobe announced that Chizen would step down as CEO effective December 1, to be replaced by Shantanu Narayen, president and chief operating officer. Chizen continued on the board until the spring of 2008, also acting as an advisor until November 28, 2008.

=== Boards and Mcafee chair (2009-2025) ===
In 2005, he was a board member at Synopsys, and president of the board of directors for the Children's Discovery Museum of San Jose. Chizen in 2008 sat on several nonprofit boards, including the Silicon Valley Education Foundation, Children's Discovery Museum of San Jose and 1st Act Silicon Valley.

Chizen became a senior advisor for private-equity firm Permira in 2008, working out of the firm's office in Menlo Park, California. Chizen became a venture partner with Voyager Capital from 2009, to 2023, when he became a strategic adviser. He is on the board of Informatica, joining in August 2015 and becoming executive chairman in August 2016.

He became an operating partner at Permira Growth Opportunities in June 2018. He is also on the board at Oracle Corporation, Synopsys, and joined the FullStory board in 2021. In 2021, he joined Nexthink's board of directors, remaining senior advisor at Permira. He invested in the Seattle startup Uplevel in 2022. In July 2024, he was chairman of McAfee, after being appointed to the role in March 2022. Permira had acquired McAfee as part of an investor group in November 2021. He was still on the Delicato board as an independent director in 2024. He is also on the boards of Elemental Technologies and NDS.

== Personal life ==
Chizen and his wife Gail lived in Los Altos, in Santa Clara County, California with their two children—a son and a daughter.
