= Global Partners in Care =

US-based non-profit organization

Global Partners in Care (GPIC), formerly known as The Foundation for Hospices in Sub-Saharan Africa (FHSSA), is a 501(c)(3) charitable organization by a group of internationally recognized hospice and HIV/AIDS care professionals to generate support for African organizations that provide hospice and palliative care to those who are dying of HIV/AIDS and other serious diseases. GPIC now works with partners around the globe enhance access, further research and education goals, and raise awareness of the crucial need for palliative care.
