= SPARS code =

Classification system for commercial compact disc releases

AAD is the SPARS code (highlighted in red) on Madonna's 1990 album, The Immaculate Collection

The SPARS code is a three-position alphabetic classification system developed in the early 1980s by the Society of Professional Audio Recording Services (SPARS) for commercial compact disc releases to denote aspects of the sound recording and reproduction process, distinguishing between the use of analog equipment and digital equipment. The code's three positions refer to recording, mixing, and mastering respectively. The first two positions may be coded either "A" for analog or "D" for digital; the third position (mastering) is always "D" on digital CDs. The scheme was not originally intended to be limited to use on digital packaged media: it was also available for use in conjunction with analog releases such as vinyl or cassette (where the final character would always be "A"), but this was seldom done in practice.

The system was first implemented in 1984. Due to increasing complexity of recording and mixing processes developed over the code's first decade of use, SPARS decided to withdraw endorsement of the code in 1991 because they felt the code was overly simplistic and did not accurately reflect the complexity of typical recording and mixing processes in use at the time. However, many record labels continued to use the code and SPARS decided to re-endorse the SPARS code in 1995.

== Codes ==
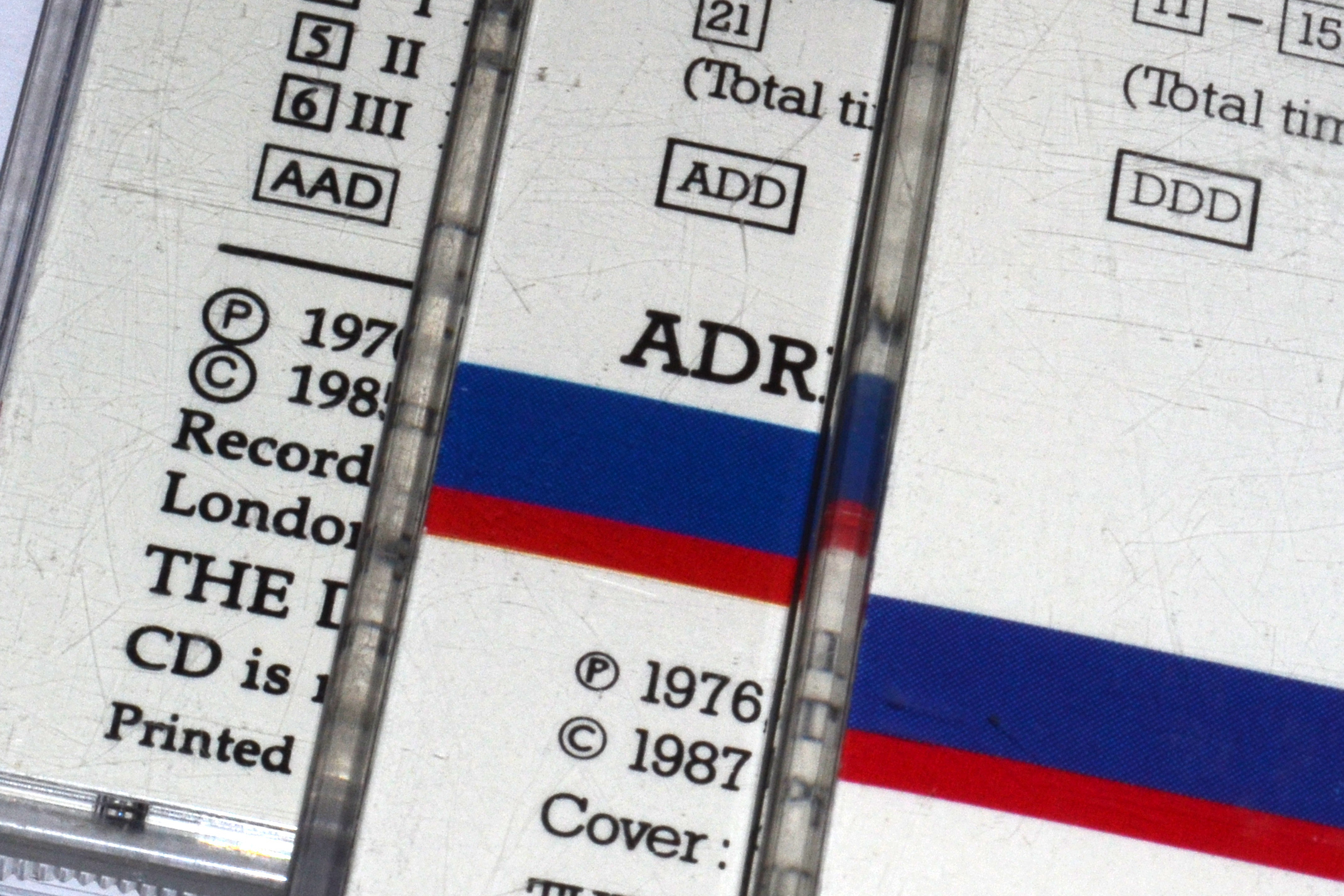
AAD, ADD and DDD codes seen on various CDs of archive material issued by Decca during the mid-to-late 1980s

The three letters of the code have the following meanings:

- First letter – the type of audio recorder used during initial recording (analog or digital)
- Second letter – the type of audio recorder used during mixing (analog or digital)
- Third letter – the type of mastering used (digital for CD releases, analog for cassette and vinyl)

Eight possible variants of the code exist:

- AAA – A fully analogue recording, from the original session to mastering. Since at least the mastering recorder must be digital to make a compact disc, this code is not applicable to CDs.
- ADA – Analog tape recorder used for initial recording, digital recorder used for mixing/editing, analog mastering.
- DAA – Digital recorder used for initial recording, analog tape recorder used for mixing/editing, analog mastering.
- DDA – Digital recorder used for initial recording, digital recorder used for mixing/editing, analog mastering.
- AAD – Analog tape recorder used for initial recording, analog tape recorder used for mixing/editing, digital mastering.
- ADD – Analog tape recorder used for initial recording, digital recorder used for mixing/editing, digital mastering.
- DAD – Digital recorder used for initial recording, analog tape recorder used for mixing/editing, digital mastering.
- DDD – Digital recorder used for initial recording, digital recorder used for mixing/editing, digital mastering.

As digital tape recorders only became widely available in the late 1970s, almost all recordings prior to this date that appear on CD will be AAD or ADD, having been digitally remastered. This means that the original analog master tape has been converted (transcribed) to digital. It does not always imply that there has been any additional editing or mixing, although this may have taken place.

In practice, DAD was very rare, as many companies (especially the well-known classical music labels) used digital tape recorders (which were not prohibitively more expensive than analog tape recorders) during the editing or mixing stage.

The jewel box booklet and/or inlay of early compact discs included the SPARS code, typically DDD, ADD, or AAD. The typeface Combi Symbols CD includes the two common ways that the code was written on recordings.

== History ==
Chris Stone and other members of the Society of Professional Audio Recording Services (SPARS) proposed the code with a set of guidelines for CD manufacturers to mark their product with an indication of exactly which parts of the recording process were analog and which were digital.

The SPARS code was first introduced on commercial CD releases by PolyGram in 1984.

SPARS withdrew endorsement of the code in 1991 due to confusion over analog and digital conversions and interfaces; many felt the SPARS code oversimplified and meaningless. However, many labels continued to use it, and in 1995, the organization re-endorsed the code.

== See also ==
- Comparison of analog and digital recording
- Digital recording
- Sound recording and reproduction
- High Definition Compatible Digital
